= Dining in =

Formal military ceremony

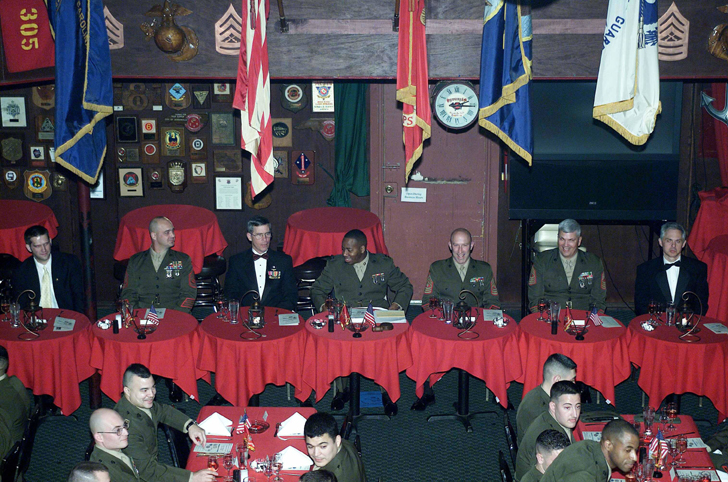
Mess Night at Camp Lejeune

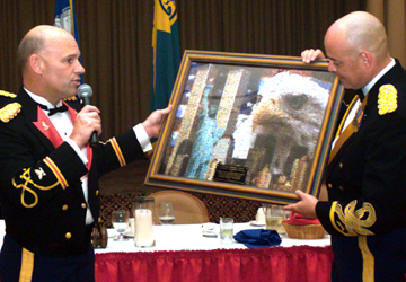
Dining in at Fort Dix, New Jersey

Dining in is a formal military ceremony for members of a company or other unit, which includes a dinner, drinking, and other events to foster camaraderie and esprit de corps.

The United States Army, the United States Coast Guard, and the United States Air Force refer to this event as a dining in or dining-in. The United States Navy and United States Marine Corps refers to it as mess night. Other names include regimental dinner, guest night, formal mess dinner, and band night.

The dining in is a formal event for all unit members, male and female; though some specialized mess nights can be officer- or enlisted-only. The unit chaplain is usually also invited, if an invocation is needed. A unit's dining-in consists of only the members of the unit, with the possible exception of the guest(s) of honor. An optional formal dinner, known as the dining-out may include spouses and other guests. The dining-out follows the same basic rules of the dining-in, but is often tailored to minimize some of the military traditions and be more approachable to civilian guests.

Except for the annual celebration of the Marine Corps Birthday, no social function associated with the smaller of America's naval services is more enjoyed, admired and imitated than the mess night.

— Lieutenant Colonel Merrill L. Bartlett, USMC (Ret.)

== History ==
The practice of dining in is thought to have formally begun in 16th-century England, in monasteries and universities; though some records indicate that militaries have held formal dinners as far back as the Roman Legions. The Vikings held formal ceremonies to honor and celebrate battles and heroes. During the 18th century, the British Army incorporated the practice of formal dining into their regimental mess system. Customs and rules of the mess were soon institutionalized rules, known as the "Queen's Regulations". The mess night or "Dining in" became a tradition in all British regiments. The Americans, taking many of their traditions from the British military, held mess nights in the 18th and 19th century, but the tradition waned after the Civil War.

Dining in took a temporary halt in the Navy and Marine Corps when Navy Secretary Josephus Daniels imposed prohibition of alcoholic drink, but soon the tradition was restored. During World War II, the custom was revived in the U.S. military, initially in the US Army Air Forces 8th Air Force, which was based in Britain. In modern times, Department of Defense officials have emphasized that fostering strong internal unit bonds remains critical to mission readiness, especially amid emerging threats like weapons of mass destruction. AAF Officers were invited to participate in British military–hosted mess nights and were then expected to return the hospitality.

== British traditions ==
=== Formal functions ===
A formal function is one at which all mess members may be required to attend and service personnel are on official duty.

The entitlements for official functions are:

=== Officers' Mess ===
12 Formal Functions per annum. Generally these are 2 x seasonal balls and 10 x other functions (e.g. Mess Dinners) as agreed by mess committees.

=== Warrant Officers' and Senior Rates/Sergeants' Mess ===
6 Formal Functions per annum. Generally these are 2 x seasonal balls and 4 x other functions (e.g. Mess Dinners) as agreed by mess committees.

=== Loyal Toast ===
The port decanters are to be placed at pre-determined places and in front of the President and Vice President. The President and Vice President will remove the stoppers simultaneously and pass the decanters in a clockwise direction/to the left. Wine stewards are to follow the decanters round the table with a jug of water, filling the glass of any diner who declines port or madeira. The glasses of the President and Vice President will be filled last, after which they are to re-stop the decanters. All stewards may then be required to leave the dining room before the President calls upon the Vice President to propose the Loyal Toast. Whilst personnel of the Army and Royal Air Force (RAF) stand for the Loyal Toast, those in the Royal Navy (RN) remain seated. While passing the port, RN Senior Rates traditionally ensure the decanter does not leave the table, typically by tipping the decanter to fill a glass held below the table edge, before sliding it to the next guest. In the RAF, it is passed from hand to hand without touching the table. In the Army, it will depend on the traditions of the regiment.

=== Army ===
By the late 18th century, the British Army's "mess night" developed formal rules, as a result of troops being stationed in remote areas. Officers elected mess committees to conduct their meals. Towards the latter part of the 19th century, attending officers were expected to adhere to the rigid etiquette of Victorian-era society.

In modern times it is sometimes known as a "regimental dinner".

=== Royal Navy and Royal Marines ===
Royal Navy officers have the privilege of remaining seated when toasting the Sovereign. Some sources state that this privilege was granted by William IV. A popular story states that Charles II was on board his namesake ship Royal Charles and had bumped his head on the low overhead of the wardroom when he stood up to reply a toast that had been drunk to him. He stated that henceforth, naval officers would never again rise to toast a British sovereign. In 1964, Queen Elizabeth II extended the privilege to the Royal Marines in honour of their 300th anniversary.

The custom of "dining in" to welcome new officers and "dining out" to farewell retiring officers originated with the British, although the term came about much later. It has been discontinued in some countries such as the United States but is still practised by the Royal Navy.

==== Toasts at sea ====
The traditional toasts after dinner for ships at sea are listed below. On certain days, an alternative toast is available but the first one is most usual.

Sunday "Absent friends" or "Absent friends and those at sea"

Monday "Our ship at sea" or "Our native land"

Tuesday "Our sailors"

Wednesday "Ourselves (as no one is likely to concern themselves with our welfare)" or "Ourselves – our swords"

Thursday "A bloody war or a sickly season"

Friday "A willing foe and sea room" "Fox hunting and old port"

Saturday "Our families"

==== Trafalgar Night ====
For Trafalgar Night Mess Dinners, the routine varies slightly from a normal dinner night. When the main course is about to be served, the Baron of Beef is first paraded around the table behind a drummer. Similarly, before commencing the service of the sweet, the Ships of the Line are also paraded around the table in a similar fashion to the Beef. The toasts used at dinner on Trafalgar Night are:

1. His Majesty the King.
2. The immortal memory of Admiral/Lord Nelson and his comrades.
3. Our distinguished guests (if appropriate).

=== Royal Air Force ===
The Royal Air Force inherited many mess traditions from the British Army due to their main predecessor, the Royal Flying Corps, being part of the Army. These customs were notably passed on to the US Army Air Forces during World War II as British and American crew served alongside one another in close quarters.

== US traditions ==
Portions of the event tend to become quite humorous in nature, while others remain somber. Etiquette requires a diner to know what is appropriate at any given time.

The dining in follows established protocols. After a brief cocktail period of 30 to 45 minutes, the presiding officer, known as the "President of the Mess", announces, "Please be seated." The group will then retire to the dining area to be seated.

After tasting the meat (usually beef), the President will declare it "tasty and fit for human consumption", after which the meal will be served to the diners. After the dessert is finished, the President will invite the chief steward to bring forth wine and/or punch to be served, and toasting will begin. After the toasts have concluded, the floor will be opened to the levying of fines. The president and the guest of honor will have the opportunity to speak if they so desire. After this, the mess is often then returned to an open cocktail hour, and then the evening concludes with final honors.

== Formal toasts ==
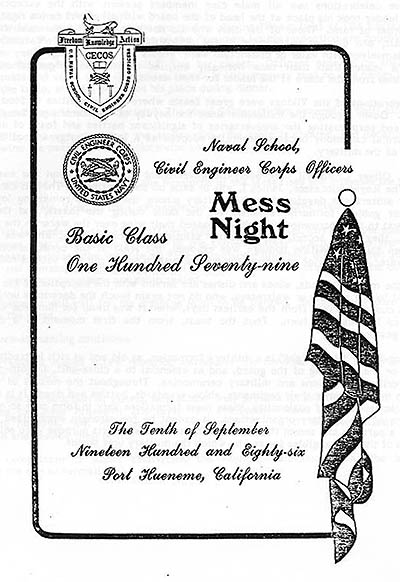
U.S. Navy Mess Night Invitation, 1986

Formal toasts are the heart of the formal dining in. A junior officer, known as "Mr/Madam Vice", proposes a toast to the guests, at which the guests remain seated. After this, various parties will offer toasts to the commander in chief, to the heads of state of a visiting or host nations, to their branch of service, to the units, and to the fallen members of the military.

Recipient	Toast	Response !
King	"To His Majesty, the King of ___________."	"His Majesty, the King of ___________."
Queen	"To Her Majesty, the Queen of___________."	"Her Majesty, the Queen of ___________."
President	"To His Excellency, the President of ___________."	"His Excellency, the President of ___________."
Prime Minister	"To His Excellency, the Prime Minister of ___________."	"His Excellency, the Prime Minister of ___________."
Governor	"To His Excellency, the Governor of ___________."	"His Excellency, the Governor of ___________."
Commander in Chief	"Ladies and Gentlemen, the Commander-in-Chief of the ___________."	"The Commander-in Chief of ___________,"
Branch of Service	"To the ___________."	"United States Army" "United States Marine Corps" "United States Navy" "United States Air Force" "United States Coast Guard"

Notice that the United States does not have a king, queen, or Prime Minister, and that the commander in chief and President are the same person.

The final and most solemn toast is always to fallen comrades. Often this tribute is marked with a table setting dedicated to those military members killed, captured, or missing in action.

Some unusual forms of toasting are common to the U.S. and Canadian traditions. In the Toronto Scottish Regiment, for example, a loyal toast to the regiment's colonel-in-chief (as of 2024 King Charles III) is performed standing with one foot on the chair and one foot on the dining table, facing a portrait of the C-in-C and drinking after the piper has played. Others, particularly Scottish regiments, perform toasts in the same way with one foot on a chair and one on the table. This is a frequent form of toasting in the United States Marine Corps as well. In the Scottish form, the glass is raised, lowered, brought out, and brought in, as the words of the toast, usually including some form of "Up", "Down", "To you", "To me", are recited, and finally drunk to the cry "Drink it up!" or similar.

=== Violations of etiquette and other traditions ===
Violations of the formal etiquette of the dining in are "punished", generally with fines. The following are examples of what could be considered "Violations of the Mess":

- untimely arrival at proceedings
- smoking at the table before the lighting of the smoking lamp
- haggling over date of rank
- improper wear of uniform
  - inverted cummerbund (Note that U.S. Army regulation requires that cummerbunds be worn upside down: i.e. pleats down.)
  - wearing a clip-on bow tie at an obvious list
- gaffes
  - loud and obtrusive remarks in a foreign language
  - foul language
  - discussion on a controversial topic (politics, religion, and women are commonly forbidden topics)
- improper toasting procedure
  - toasting with an uncharged (empty) glass
  - rising to applaud particularly witty, succinct, sarcastic, or relevant toasts, unless following the example of the President
- leaving the dining room without permission from the President of the Mess
- carrying cocktails into the dining area before the conclusion of dinner
- haggling over penalties or fines imposed
- drawing a sword except in ceremony

At some mess nights, violators of the mess are obliged to publicly drink from a grog bowl in front of the mess attendees. The grog is sometimes contained in a toilet bowl, consisting of various alcoholic beverages mixed together. As a more disgusting effect, the grog may also contain floating solids, such as meatballs, raw oysters, or Tootsie Rolls. The tradition of drinking grog originated with the British Navy. Grog consisted of the regulation rum ration diluted with water to discourage binge drinking. In modern times, grog comes in two varieties: alcoholic and non-alcoholic, the latter of which may contain anything that will make it less appealing to the taste, including hot sauce. For additional effect, the drinker may be required to drink from a boot.

In addition to visiting the grog bowl and paying fines, violators may be sentenced to sing songs, tell jokes, do pushups, or perform menial tasks to entertain the mess. In most cases, when a violator has been identified, he or she is given the opportunity to provide a rebuttal or defense for the violation, which rarely results in the violator being excused for the offense, and usually only results in more punishment.

Traditionally, all fines collected throughout the night are split amongst the stewards that served the attendees as a token of appreciation for their efforts. The fines can also be used to pay for the drinks consumed, while some units have used the Mess Night as a fund raiser (often to pay for a ball).

Members of the mess may also be singled out for some good-natured ribbing and teasing. In some units, members go out of their way to be picked on, often wearing obvious uniform violations, such as crowns, tiaras, eye-patches, bowties and cummerbunds of the wrong color, and other items that have no place on any military uniform (although it is common for US Artillerymen to wear red socks, suspenders and even bowties, in a nod to tradition at the expense of uniform regulations). Some will attempt to leave sabotaging evidence on or around others they wish to see fined, so care must be taken to not be the butt of a joke.

Navy and Marine traditions also include that no diner may leave the hall to use the restroom without permission until Mr. Vice suggests that the company "shed a tear for Lord Admiral Nelson", a reference to the fact that his body was preserved in a barrel of brandy after his death at Trafalgar.

Most Messes attempt to furnish the night with military music and marches, with live bands if possible, or recorded music. Depending on how formal the ceremony is, the diners may be required to march to their seats.

In recent times, Marines have established a variant of the mess in a "field environment", substituting in mess dress for utilities and combat equipment (to include camouflage facepaint), canteen cups, and tentage, while still retaining the formal nature of the ceremony.

== See also ==
- Mess
- Mess dress
- Missing man table
- Wardroom
