= Toast (honor) =

Ritual honorific expression of drink

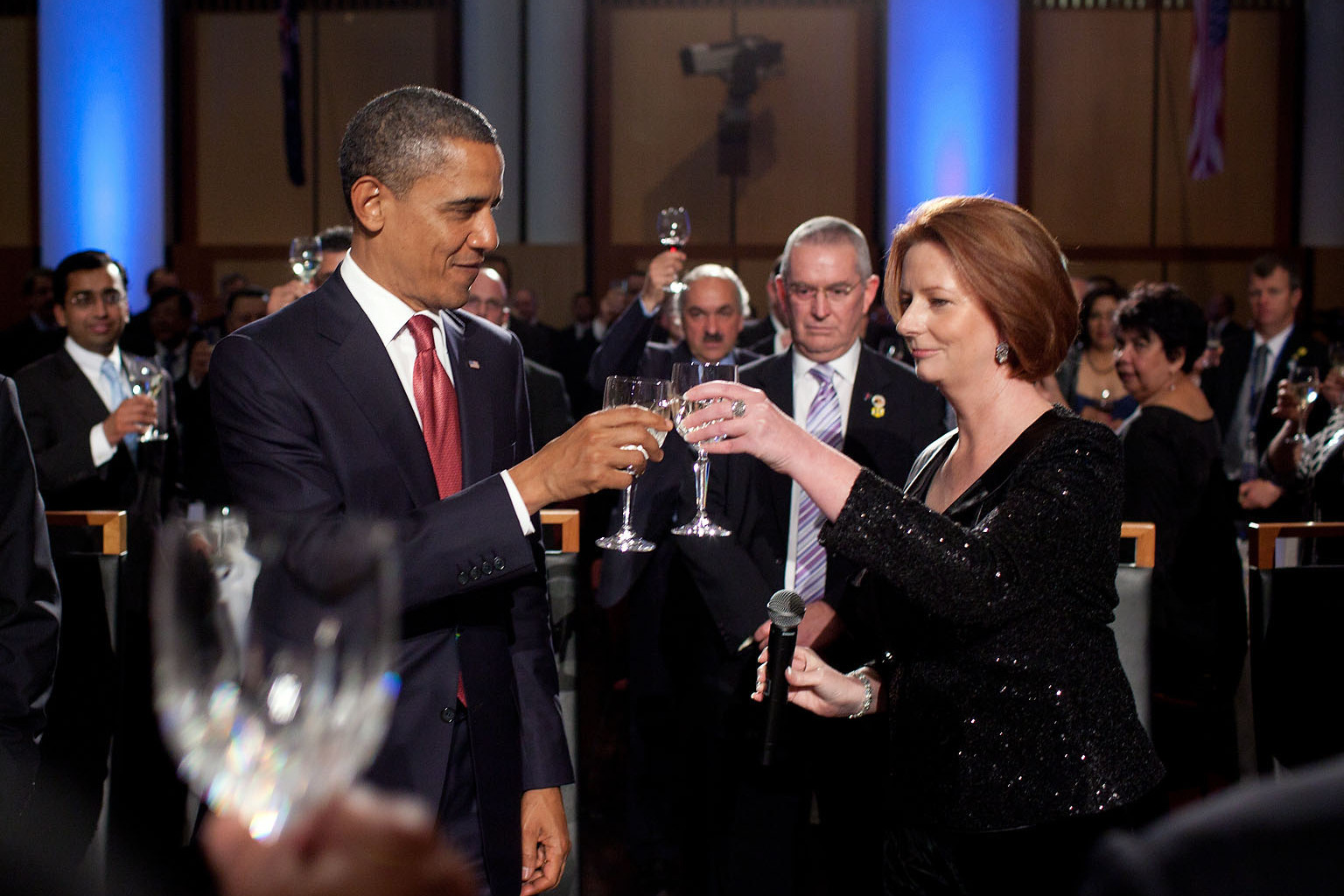
U.S. President Barack Obama and Australian Prime Minister Julia Gillard toast at a dinner at the Australian Parliament House in 2011

A toast is a ritual during which a drink is taken as an expression of honour or goodwill. The term may be applied to the person, animal or object so honoured, the drink taken, or the verbal expression accompanying the drink. Thus, a person could be "the toast of the evening", for whom someone "proposes a toast" to congratulate and for whom a third person "toasts" in agreement. The ritual forms the basis of the literary and performance genre, of which Mark Twain's "To the Babies" is a well-known example.

The toast as described in this article is rooted in Western culture, but certain cultures outside that sphere have their own traditions in which consuming a drink is connected with ideas of celebration and honour. While the physical and verbal ritual of the toast may be elaborate and formal, merely raising one's glass towards someone or something or clinking glasses with someone else's and then drinking is essentially a toast as well, the message being one of goodwill towards the person, animal or object indicated.

== History ==
Hip, Hip, Hurrah! by Danish painter P.S. Krøyer, 1888

According to various apocryphal stories, the custom of touching glasses evolved from concerns about poisoning. By one account, clinking glasses together would cause each drink to spill over into the others' (though there is no real evidence for such an origin). According to other stories, the word toast became associated with the custom in the 17th century, based on a custom of flavouring drinks with spiced toast. The word originally referred to the lady in whose honour the drink was proposed, with her name interpreted as figuratively flavouring the drink. The International Handbook on Alcohol and Culture states that toasting "is probably a secular vestige of ancient sacrificial libations in which a sacred liquid was offered to the gods: blood or wine in exchange for a wish, a prayer summarized in the words 'long life!' or 'to your health!'"

== Situations ==
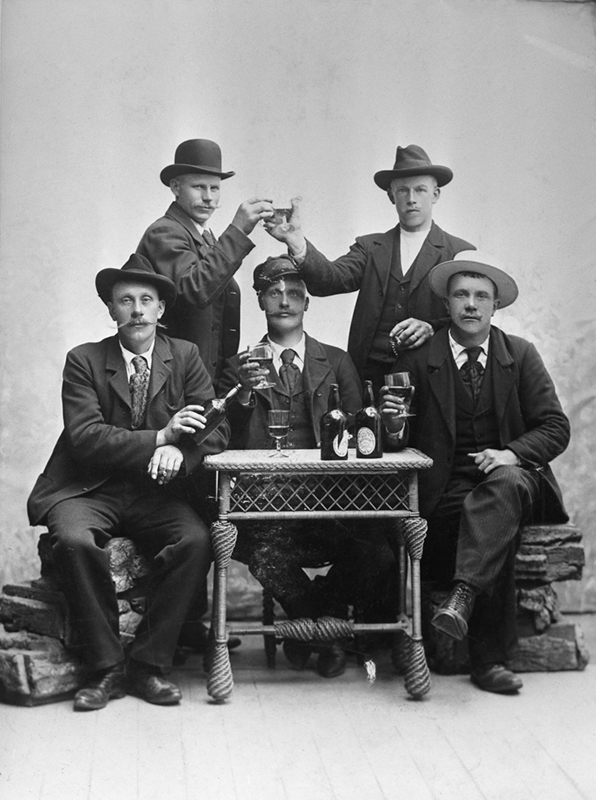
Five Swedish men toasting (c. 1900)

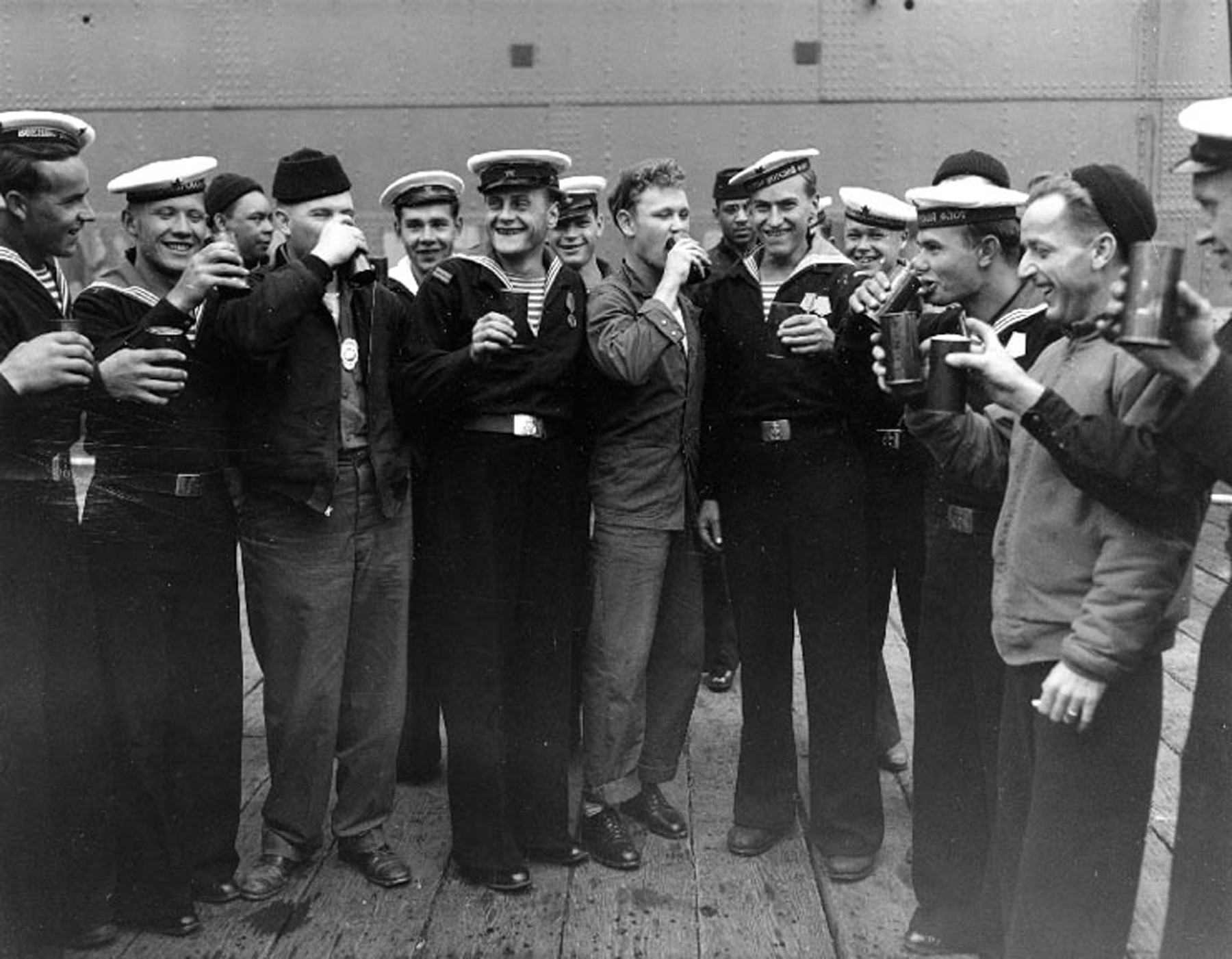
Celebratory drinks for the end of World War II

Toasts are generally offered at times of celebration or commemoration, including certain holidays, such as New Year's Eve. Other occasions include retirement celebrations, housewarming parties, births, etc. The protocol for toasting at weddings is comparatively elaborate and fixed. At a wedding reception, the father of the bride, in his role as host, regularly offers the first toast, thanking the guests for attending, offering tasteful remembrances of the bride's childhood, and wishing the newlyweds a happy life together. The best man usually proposes a toast in the form of best wishes and congratulations to the newlyweds. A best man's toast takes the form of a short speech (3–5 minutes) that combines a mixture of humour and sincerity. The humour often comes in the shape of the best man telling jokes at the groom's expense, whilst the sincerity incorporates the praise and complimentary comments that a best man should make about the bride and groom, amongst others. The actual "toast" is then delivered at the end of the speech and is a short phrase wishing the newlyweds a happy, healthy, loving life together. The maid of honour may follow suit, appropriately tailoring her comments to the bride. The groom may offer the final toast, thanking the bride's parents for hosting the wedding, the wedding party for their participation, and finally dedicating the toast to the bridesmaids.

Typical traditional wedding toasts include the following:

(to the couple)
Here's to your coffins
May they be made of hundred-year-old oaks
Which we shall plant tomorrow.
May you both live as long as you want, and never want as long as you live
May the best of your yesterdays be the worst of your tomorrows. (to the bride)
May I see you grey
And combing your grandchildren's hair.

Toasts are also offered on patriotic occasions, as in the case of Stephen Decatur's famous "Our country! In our intercourse with foreign nations may we always be in the right; but our country, right or wrong." Equally traditional are satiric verses:

Here's to dear old Boston,
The home of the bean and the cod,
Where Lowells speak only to Cabots,
And Cabots speak only to God.

== Norms and etiquette of toasting ==
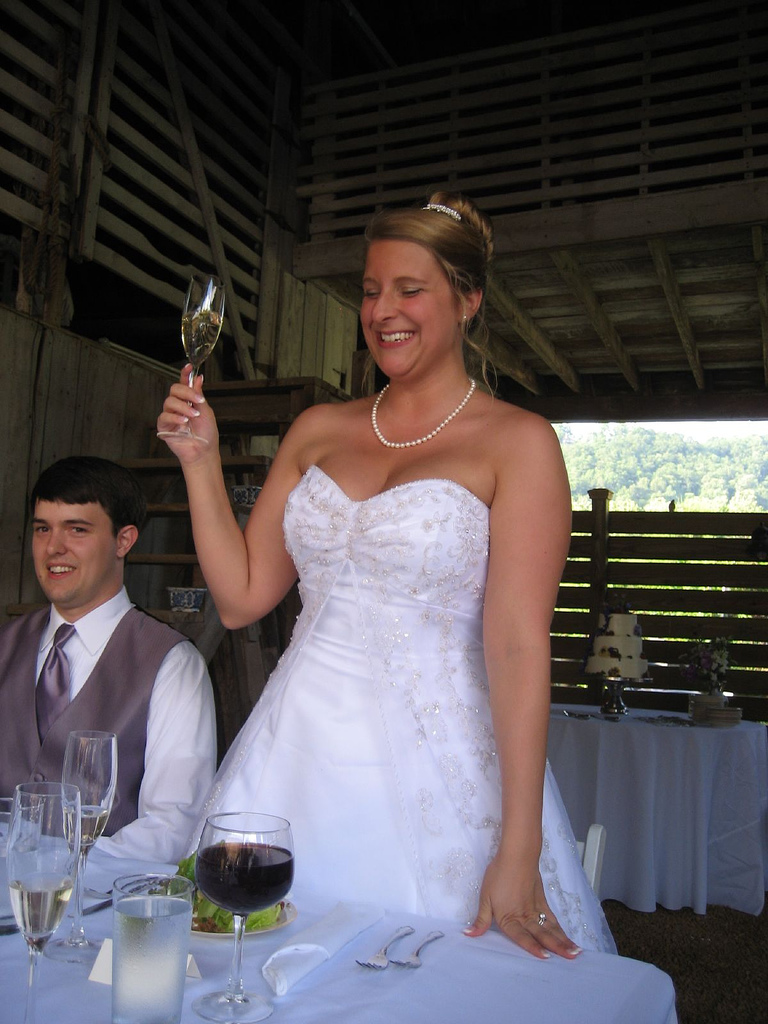
A bride offering a toast at a wedding

Toasts may be solemn, sentimental, humorous, bawdy, or insulting. The practice of announcing one's intention to propose a toast and signalling for quiet by rapping on the wineglass, while common, is regarded by some authorities as rude. Except in very small and informal gatherings, a toast is offered standing. At a gathering, none should offer a toast to the guest of honour until the host has had the opportunity to do so. In English-speaking countries, guests may signal their approval of the toast by saying "hear hear". The person honoured should neither stand nor drink, but after the toast should rise to thank the one who has offered the toast and take a drink, perhaps but not necessarily offering a toast in turn. As toasts may occur in long series, experienced attendees often make sure to leave enough wine in the glass to allow participation in numerous toasts.

Putting one's glass down before the toast is complete, or simply holding one's glass without drinking is widely regarded as impolite, suggesting that one does not share the benevolent sentiments expressed in the toast, nor the unity and fellowship implicit in toasting itself. Even the non-drinker is advised not to refuse to allow wine to be poured into his glass for a toast. Inverting the glass is discouraged.

Toasting traditionally involves alcoholic beverages. Champagne (or at least some variety of sparkling wine, or for teetotalers, sparkling grape juice) is regarded as especially festive and is widely associated with New Year's Eve and other celebrations. Many people nowadays substitute sparkling fruit juice (often packaged in champagne-style bottles), and many authorities consider it perfectly acceptable to participate in a toast while drinking water. Toasting with an empty glass may be viewed by some as acceptable behaviour for the non-drinker, though feigning to drink from such a glass would probably be regarded as ridiculous. The person giving the toast should never do so with an empty glass, even if the glass contains nothing more than water.

Teetotallers may view the drinking of toasts to be abominable and incompatible with their views, as witnessed by this narrative from The Teetotaler (1840):

At the anniversary of Cheshunt College, Sir Culling Eardley Smith was in the chair. This gentleman, after dinner, said "he had subscribed to the Teetotal Pledge, which of course was incompatible with the drinking of toasts;" when the Rev. J. Blackburn, (minister of Claremont Chapel, Pentonville,) said "he was not a teetotaler,—he was not in bondage,—and on that subject he had very recently been preaching." What could the Rev. Gentleman mean by this, but that he had recently been preaching against Teetotalism? Let the Rev. Gentleman look at drinking customs and their enormous evils, and ask himself if he has done his duty; or whether he expects to be pronounced "a good and faithful servant", if he continues even from the pulpit to encourage the great damning evil of this nation. Mr. Donaldson said that he was happy to add, that one of the most popular ministers of the day, the Rev. J. Sherman, gave Mr. B. a pretty severe and well-merited reply, by saying, "His brother Blackburn had said, he (Mr. B.) was not in bondage; he must be allowed to say, that he rejoiced that he (Mr. S.) had been enabled to break through the old and stupid custom of washing down sentiments by draughts of intoxicating liquors. He had thus become a free man.

Mr. Donaldson concluded with some very severe animadversions upon the infamous conduct of Mr. Blackburn.

It is a superstition in the Royal Navy, and therefore the Australian, Canadian and New Zealand Navies as well as the United States Navy that a toast is never to be made with water, since the person so honoured will be doomed to a watery grave. During a United States Air Force Dining In, all toasts are traditionally made with wine except for the final toast of the night made in honour of POWs/MIAs; because these honorees did not have the luxury of wine while in captivity, the toast is made with water. Some versions of the protocol prescribe a toast in water for all deceased comrades.

It is, or was, the custom in the (British) Royal Navy to drink the Loyal toasts sitting, because in old-type wooden warships below decks there was not enough headroom to stand upright.

== L'Chaim ==
L'Chaim in Hebrew is a toast meaning "to life". When a couple becomes engaged, they get together with friends and family to celebrate. Since they drink l'chaim ("to life"), the celebration is also called a l'chaim.

The origins of the custom to toast this way may be traced to an account described in the Talmud, where R. Akiva said upon pouring cups of wine poured at a banquet a benediction of "Wine and life to the mouth of the sages, wine and life to the mouth of the sages and their students." Many reasons for this custom have been offered. One reason based on the Zohar is to wish that the wine would be tied to the tree of life and not to the tree of death with which Eve had sinned. A second reason brought forward is that there was a common practice to make people who intend to kill drink wine and thereby be calmed, and therefore there is a custom to proclaim "to life!" over wine in the hope that it will prevent bloodshed. A third reason is that wine was created to comfort those who are in mourning (based on Proverbs 31:6) and there emerged a practice to toast thus when drinking in sad times in the hope that one day the drinker will drink wine in good happy times, and the practice of toasting this way subsequently extended to all situations.

== The German word "prost" ==
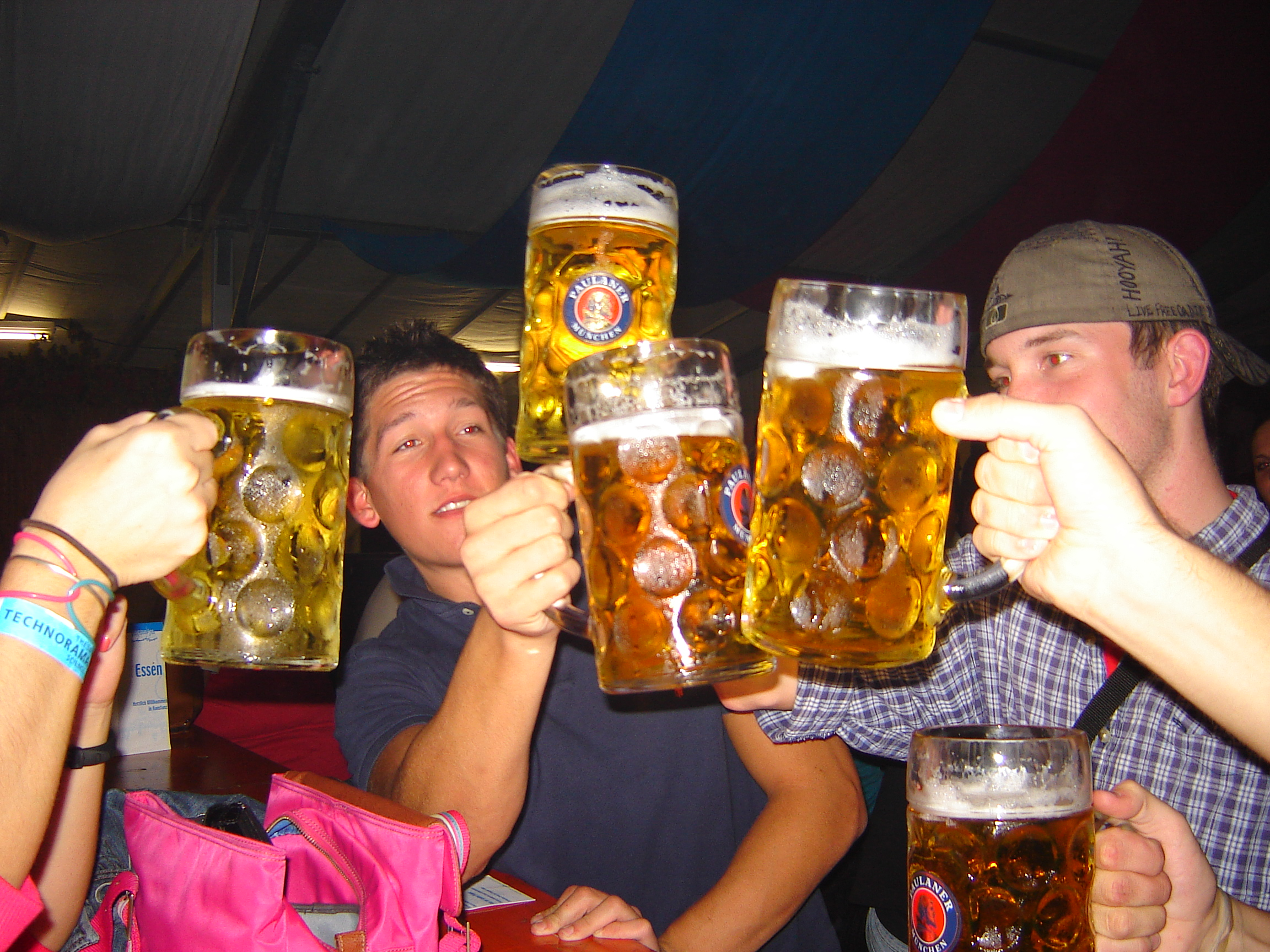
Toasting at Oktoberfest

=== Prosit/Prost ===
Prosit is a Latin word, meaning roughly "be well", which is a toast in Latin and modern Italian, from which the German short form "prost" is derived. This is a toast in German. The expression dates back to the beginning of the 18th century when it was used among university students and eventually made its way into everyday language. In a ceremonious context and in connection with a short speech, the English word "toast" may also be used.

The Latin word comes from the verb "prodesse" (= "to benefit sth/sb", "to be beneficial"). Consequently, "prosit" is the conjugated form (3rd person Singular, Present Subjunctive, Active) and therefore an optative: "To you/ to your health". Like the colloquial "prost", "prosit" was originally used by university students.

=== Usage ===
In German, synonyms like "Wohl bekomm's!", "Zum Wohl!", and many versions from other languages may also be used instead of "prosit". The acclamation itself is also referred to as a "prosit". The verb form is "zuprosten", where the prefix "zu" means that the speech act is targeted at one or several people.

In the Swabian dialect, the word has the further meaning of a belch, called a "Prositle". The acclamation is followed by the clinking of glasses, often linked to other rules like making eye contact. This ritual is commonly attributed to a medieval custom, whereby one could avoid being poisoned by one's drinking companions, as a few drops of each beverage got mixed when clinking glasses. In all probability, this did not work. It was much more effective for one table to share one or more drinking vessels, a procedure which was common for a long time.

In Danish, Swedish, and Norwegian, "prosit" is a blessing used in response to a sneeze, in the same way the English expression "bless you" is used. In the Netherlands, the Dutch form 'proost' is sometimes used in response to a sneeze.

In Germany, toasting, not necessarily by words but usually just by touching each other's drinking vessels, is usually a very closely observed part of culture. In private company, no one should drink a sip of alcohol before having toasted all the other people at the table. In doing this, it is very important to look directly into the other drinker's eyes. Not practising this is considered rude and often, humorously, believed to attract all kinds of bad luck (e.g. "seven years of bad luck" and the like).

== Traditional toasts ==
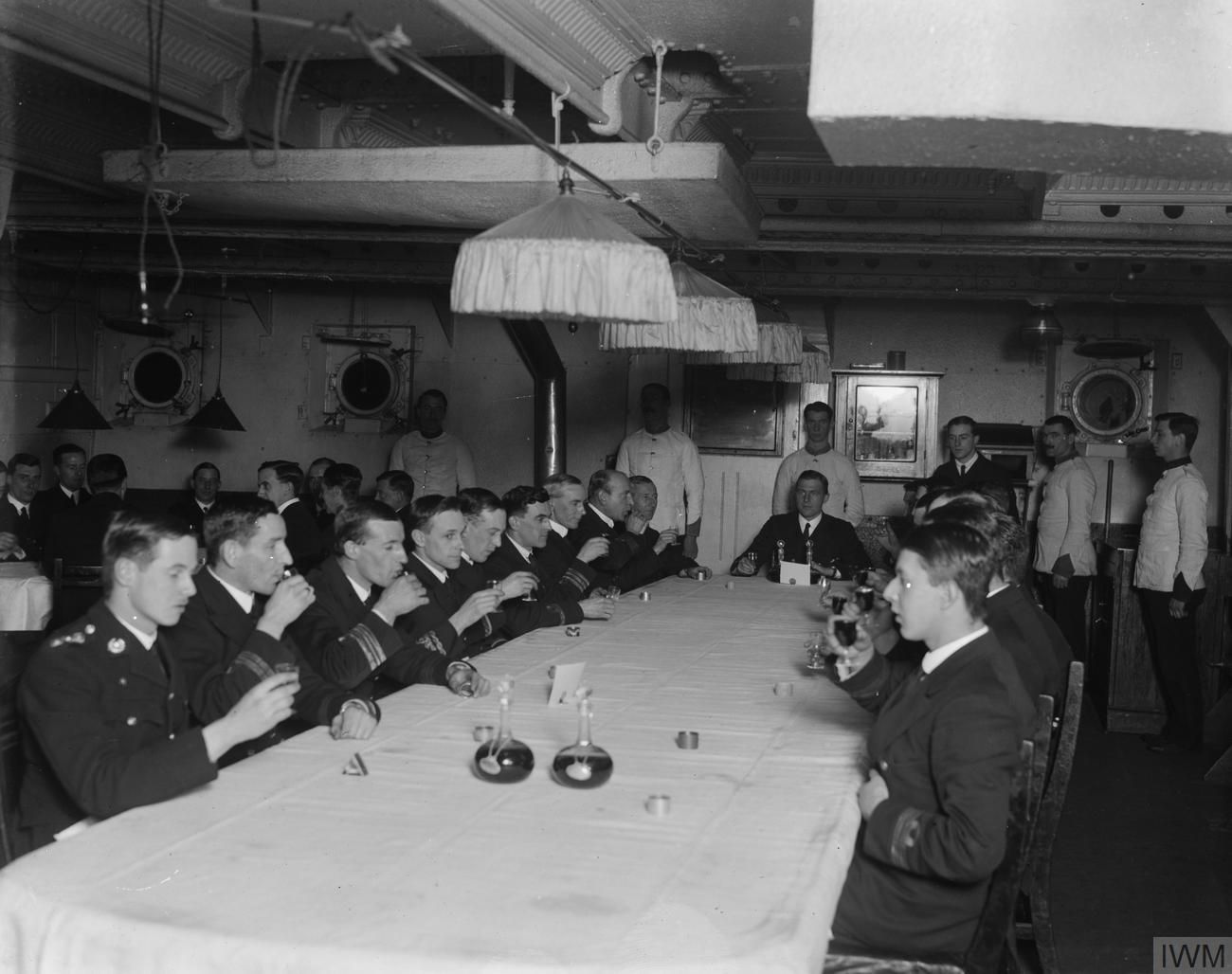
Royal Navy officers in a wardroom seated toasting the King, from a series titled 'The Royal Navy during the Second World War'.

In the British Royal Navy, the officers' noon mess typically began with the loyal toast, followed by a toast distinctive for the day of the week:

- Monday: Our ships at sea.
- Tuesday: Our sailors (formerly Our men but changed to include women).
- Wednesday: Ourselves. ("As no-one else is likely to concern themselves with our welfare" is often the retort and not part of the toast)
- Thursday: A bloody war or a sickly season (meaning the desire and likelihood of being promoted when many people die: during war or sickness).
- Friday: A willing foe and sea room.
- Saturday: Our families (formerly "Our wives and sweethearts", with the retort of "may they never meet").
- Sunday: Absent friends.

The sequence was also prescribed in at least one publication for the United States Navy.

A toast might be spontaneous and free-form, a carefully planned original speech, or a recitation of traditional sentiments such as this Irish example:

May the road rise up to meet you.
May the wind be always at your back.
May the sun shine warm upon your face.
And rains fall soft upon your fields.
And until we meet again,
May God hold you in the hollow of His hand.

An informal variation of the last two lines:

And may ye be in Heaven a half-hour
afore the devil knows ye're dead!

== Toasts worldwide ==
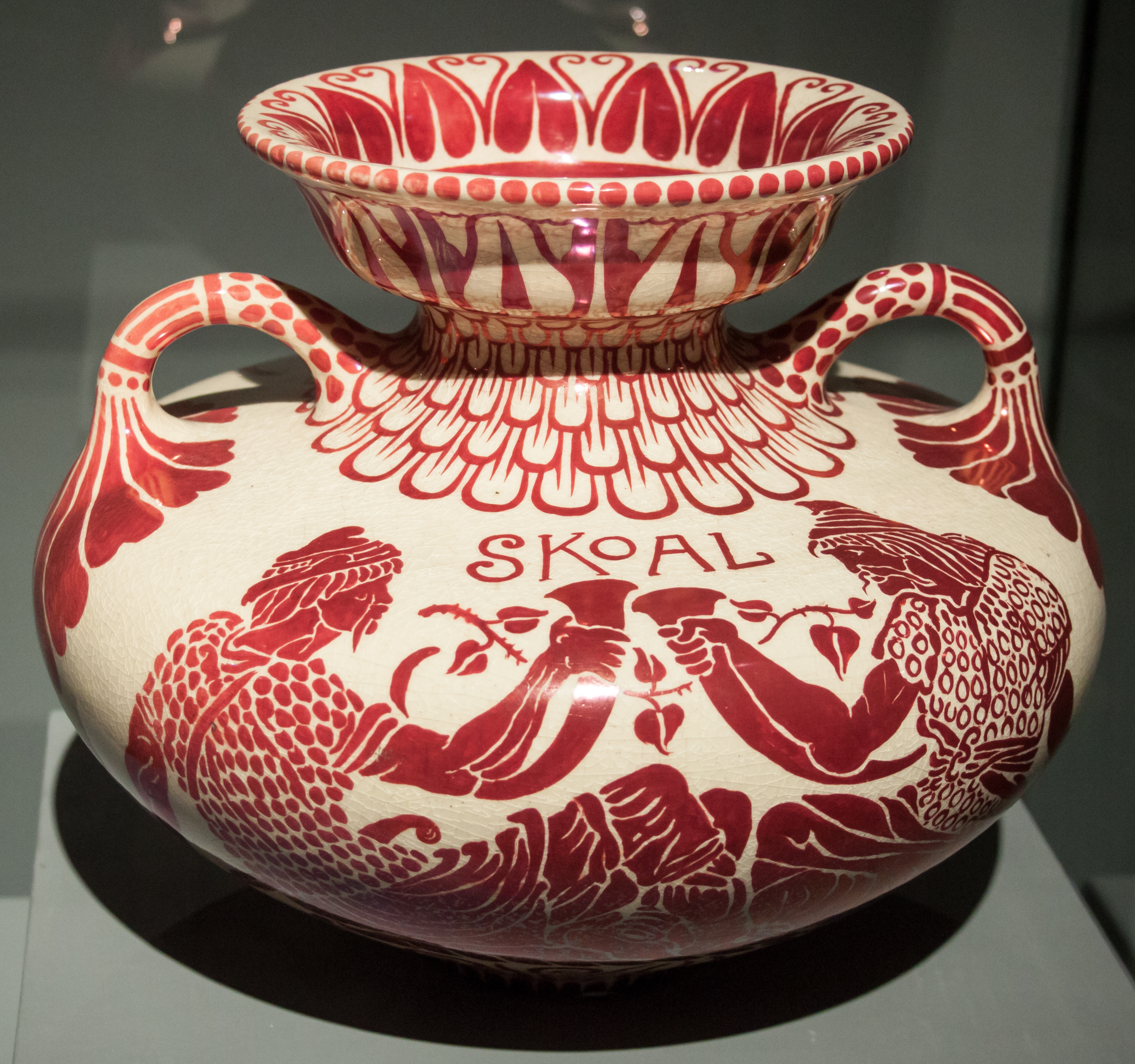
Skoal, the usual toast in Nordic languages, Maw & Co English art pottery vase designed by Walter Crane, c. 1885

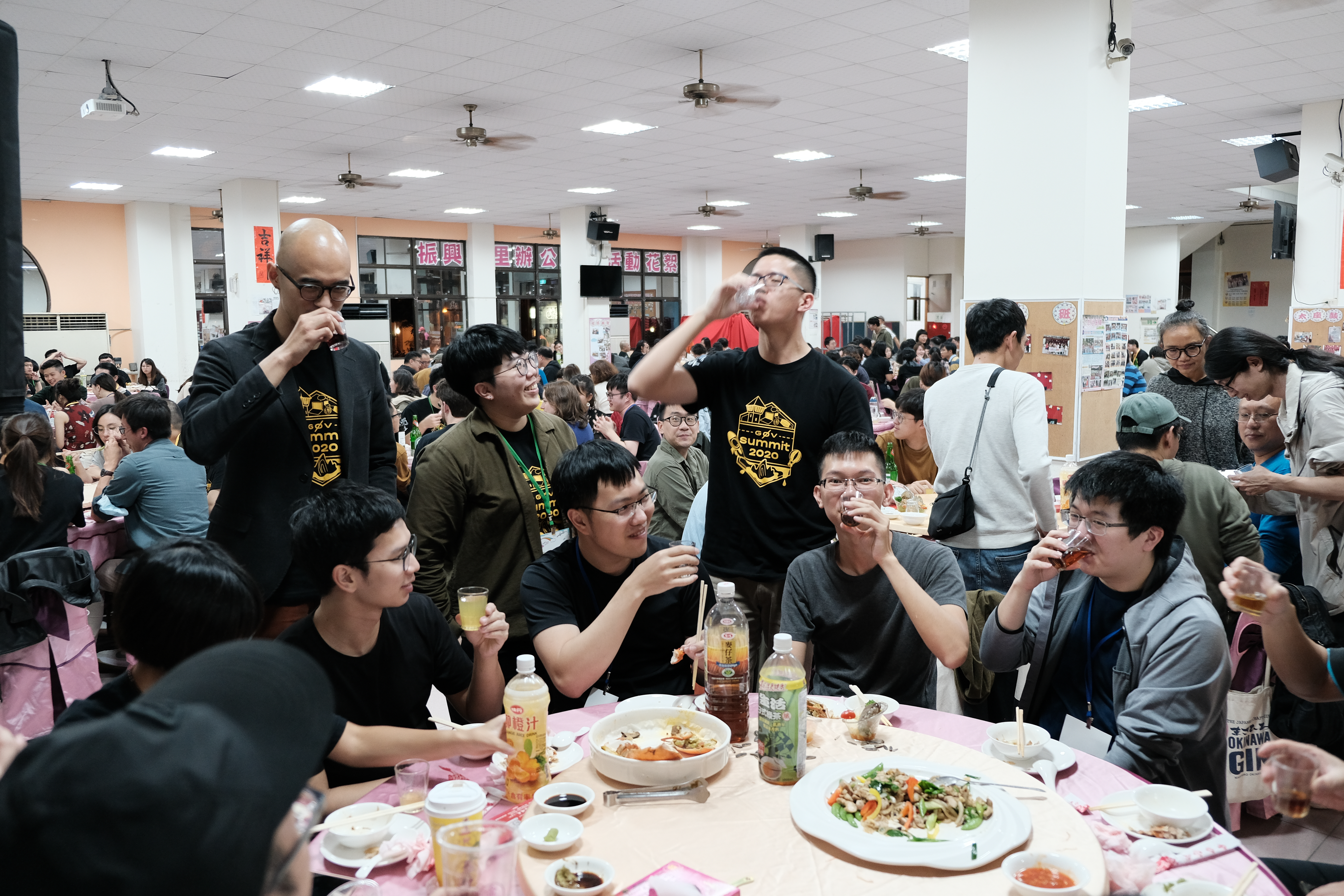
Toasting in a Taiwanese roadside banquet event

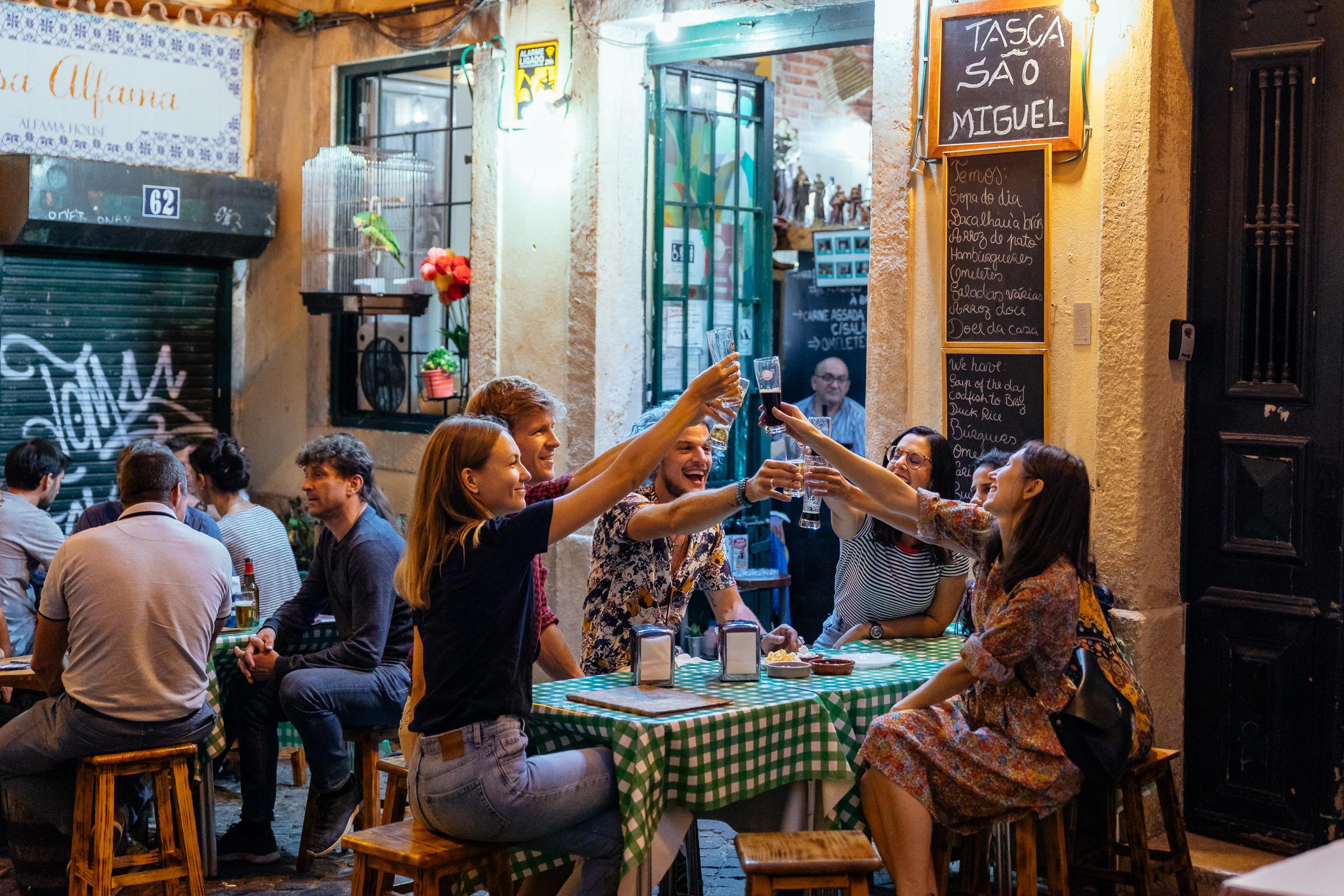
A toast in Lisbon, Portugal

In various cultures worldwide, toasting is common; to refrain from so doing may be a breach of etiquette. The general theme of a toast is "good luck" or "good health". At formal meals in certain countries of the Commonwealth of Nations, the first toast to be proposed is traditionally the Loyal Toast ("The King"). This may be adapted in other countries to give a loyal toast to the appropriate head of state.

Selected examples of toasts worldwide:

- Albanian: "Gëzuar" (enjoy)
- Afrikaans: "Gesondheid", "Tjorts", or "Tjeers" (to good health, cheers, or bottoms up!)
- Amharic language (Ethiopia): "Le'tenachin!" (to our health)
- Arabic: "بصحتك" (be ṣaḥtak, for your health)
- Armenian: "Կենաց" or "Կենացդ" (kenats/genats or kenatst/genatst, "to life" or "to your life")
- Australian English: Cheers, mate! (to your happiness my friend)
- Basque: "Topa!" (toast)
- Batak Toba: "Lissoi!" (cheers!)
- Belarusian: "Будзьма!" (budzma, may we live!)
- Bosnian: "Nazdravlje" (to health) or "Živjeli" (live!)
- Bulgarian: "Наздраве" (nazdrave, to health)
- Catalan: "Salut!" (to health), "Brindem" (to toast), "Xin-xin" (as emulating the sound of the glasses), "Salut i força al canut!" (traditional phallic rhyme, meaning "health and strength to the dick"), "Brindem, brindem, brindola, pels nostres pits i la vostra titola" (variation including tits and dick), "Salut i peles!" (health and money, as popularized by the translation in Catalan of the British series Bottom).
- Chinese:

- Mandarin: "乾杯" (gānbēi, lit. "Empty the glass", similar to "bottoms up" in English), "請請" (qing qing, lit. "Please, please," said by host when inviting guests to drink, fig. as emulating the sound of the glasses)
- Cantonese: "飲杯" (yam2 bui1, lit. "Drink the glass", similar to "bottoms up" in English), "飲勝" (yam2 sing3, lit. 'Drink for victory')
- Hokkien/Taiwanese Hokkien: "予焦啦" (hōo ta--lah, "Empty the glass", similar to "bottoms up" in English)

- Cornish: "Yeghes da!" (Good health!)
- Croatian: "Živjeli" (live!), "Nazdravlje" (to health)
- Czech: "Na zdraví" (to health)

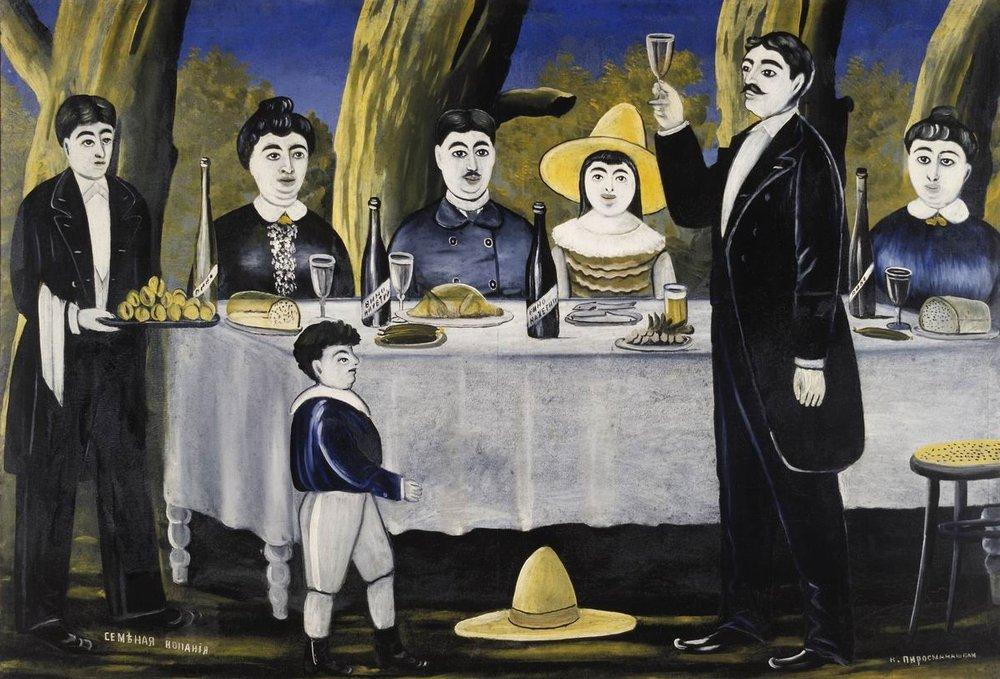
Family feast by Niko Pirosmani. A Georgian tamada proposes a toast

- Danish: "Skål" (lit. "bowl", refers to older drinking vessels)
- Dutch: "Proost" (from Latin prosit "may it be good" (i.e., for you)), or "(op je) gezondheid" ((to your) health); in Belgium: schol (from Scandinavian) or santé (from the French).
- English: "Cheers", "Bottoms up", "Chin-chin" (dated, from Chinese qing qing).
- Esperanto: "Je via sano!" (to your health)
- Estonian: "Terviseks" (for the health) or "proosit" (from German "Prost")
- Filipino: "Mabuhay" (long live); "Tagay" ([let us] drink); "Kampay" (from Japanese kanpai); the Philippines does not historically have a toast, because social drinking of alcohol traditionally involves the sharing of one cup among participants (a tagayan)
- Finnish: "Kippis", "Skool", "Pohjanmaan kautta", or "Hölökyn kölökyn" (in Savonian dialects)
- French: "Tchin tchin" (from Chinese qing qing), "Santé" (health) or "cul sec" (lit. "dry bottom", to drink the whole glass in one go)
- Galician: "Saúde" (Good health)
- Georgian: "გაუმარჯოს!" (Gaumarjos!) (Victory!)
- German: "Prost", "Prosit", from Latin prosit (may it be good (i.e., for you)) or "Zum Wohl" (to health)
- Greek: "Εις υγείαν" (is iyían), "στην υγειά σου/μας", "γειά" (for health) or "Εβίβα" (eviva, from Italian evviva, "long life!")
- Hebrew: "לחיים" ("L'Chayyim") (to life, traditional Jewish toast)
- Hindi: "अच्छी सेहत" (achchee sehat, "good health")
- Hungarian: "Egészségünkre" (for our health), more commonly "Egészségedre" [ˈɛgeːʃːeːgɛdrɛ] (to your health), "Fenékig" (lit. "to the bottom", similar to "bottoms up" in English)
- Icelandic: "Skál" (lit. "bowl", referring to older drinking vessels)
- Indonesian: "Bersulang"
- Irish: "Sláinte" (health)
- Italian: "Un brindisi!" ("A toast!" From the Italian brindare, to toast), "Prosit" (from the Latin), "Cin Cin" (onomatopoeic imitating the sound of glasses touching) or "Salute" (health)
- Japanese: "乾杯" (kanpai, lit. "Empty the glass", similar to "bottoms up" in English)
- Korean: "건배" ("乾杯", geonbae, lit. "Empty the glass", similar to "bottoms up" in English), “짠” (jjan, slang word imitating glasses clinking together)
- Latin: "Vives" ("may you live), often in the Greek form ZHCAIC given in Latin letters as ZESES; "Prosit" or "Propino"
- Latvian: "Priekā" (to joy)
- Lithuanian: "Į sveikatą" (to health)
- Macedonian: "На здравје" (na zdravje, to health)
- Malay: "Hirup" (slurp), "Bantai" (beat up), "Yam seng" (from Cantonese yam2 sing3), "Aramaiti" or "Oh-ha"
- Maltese: "Saħħa" (health)
- Manx: "Slaynt" (health) or "Slaynt vie" (good health)
- Māori (NZ): "Mauri ora" (to life)
- Marathi: "Chang bhala" (may it be good)
- Mexican Spanish: "Salud" (to health) or "Saludcita" (to health, diminutive)
- Nepali: "तरङ्ग" ("tarang", 'wave')
- Norwegian: "Skål" (lit. "bowl", referring to older drinking vessels)
- Persian: "به سلامتی" (Be salamati, "good health" )
- Polish: "Na zdrowie" (to health), "Twoje zdrowie" (to your health, singular) or "Wasze zdrowie" (to your health, formal or plural)
- Portuguese: "Saúde" (health) or "Tchim-tchim" (onomatopoeic imitating the sound of glasses touching)

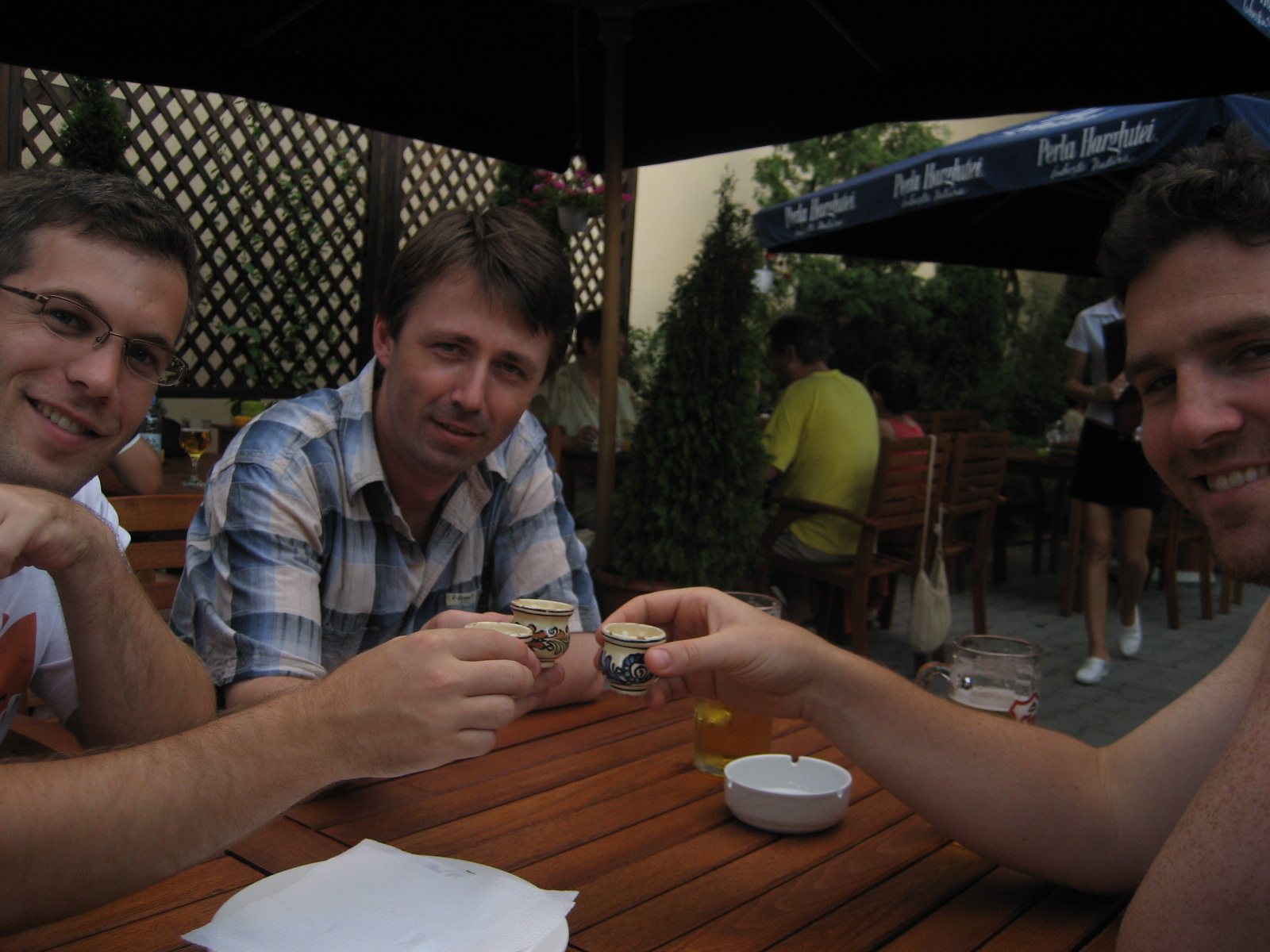
Pre-meal toast in Mureș County, Romania

- Romanian: "Noroc" (good luck) or "Sănătate" (health)
- Russian: "Ваше здоровье!" (Vashe zdorov'ye, to your health) or "Будем здоровы!" (Boodiem zdorovy!, let's be healthy!) or simply "Будем!" (Boodiem!, let's be [healthy]!)
- Scottish Gaelic: "Slàinte mhath" (good health)
- Serbian: "Uzdravlje", "Nazdravlje" (to health) or "Živeli" (live!)
- Singlish: "Yum seng" (drink to victory)
- Slovak: "Na zdravie" (to health)
- Slovene: "Na zdravje" (to health)
- Spanish/Castilian: "¡Chinchín!" (onomatopoeic for clinking of glasses or "¡Salud!" (health). In Chile, the diminutive "¡Salucita!" is often employed.
- Swedish: "Skål" (lit. "bowl", referring to older drinking vessels); Gutår ("good year", old fashioned, still used in formal settings)
- Swiss German: "Proscht" (as in German "Prost") or as diminutive form "Pröschtli"
- Thai: "ไชโย" (chai-yo!, lit. "Victory!") or "ชนแก้ว" (chon-kaew, lit. "knock glasses") or "หมดแก้ว" (mod-kaew, lit. "Bottoms up")
- Turkish: "Şerefe" (to honor)
- Ukrainian: "За здоров'я" or "Ваше здоров'я" (Za zdorovya, to health, or Vashe zdorovya, to your health) or "Будьмо" (Budmo, let us be)
- Urdu: "Jam e Sehat" (Drink of health)
- Vietnamese: "Dô" or "dzô" ((take) in)
- Welsh: "Iechyd da (i chi)" (Good health (to you))

== See also ==
- "Champagne for my real friends, real pain for my sham friends"
- Cheer
- Roast (comedy)
- Tamada
- Toastmaster
- Toastmasters International
- Toasts of the Royal Navy
- Types of speeches

== Sources ==
- Dickson, Paul (2017). "A Brief History of Raised Glasses". Toasts: Over 1,500 of the Best Toasts, Sentiments, Blessings, and Graces. Book Sales. pp. 5–24. ISBN 978-0-7858-3569-1.
