= Sláinte =

Gaelic drinking toast

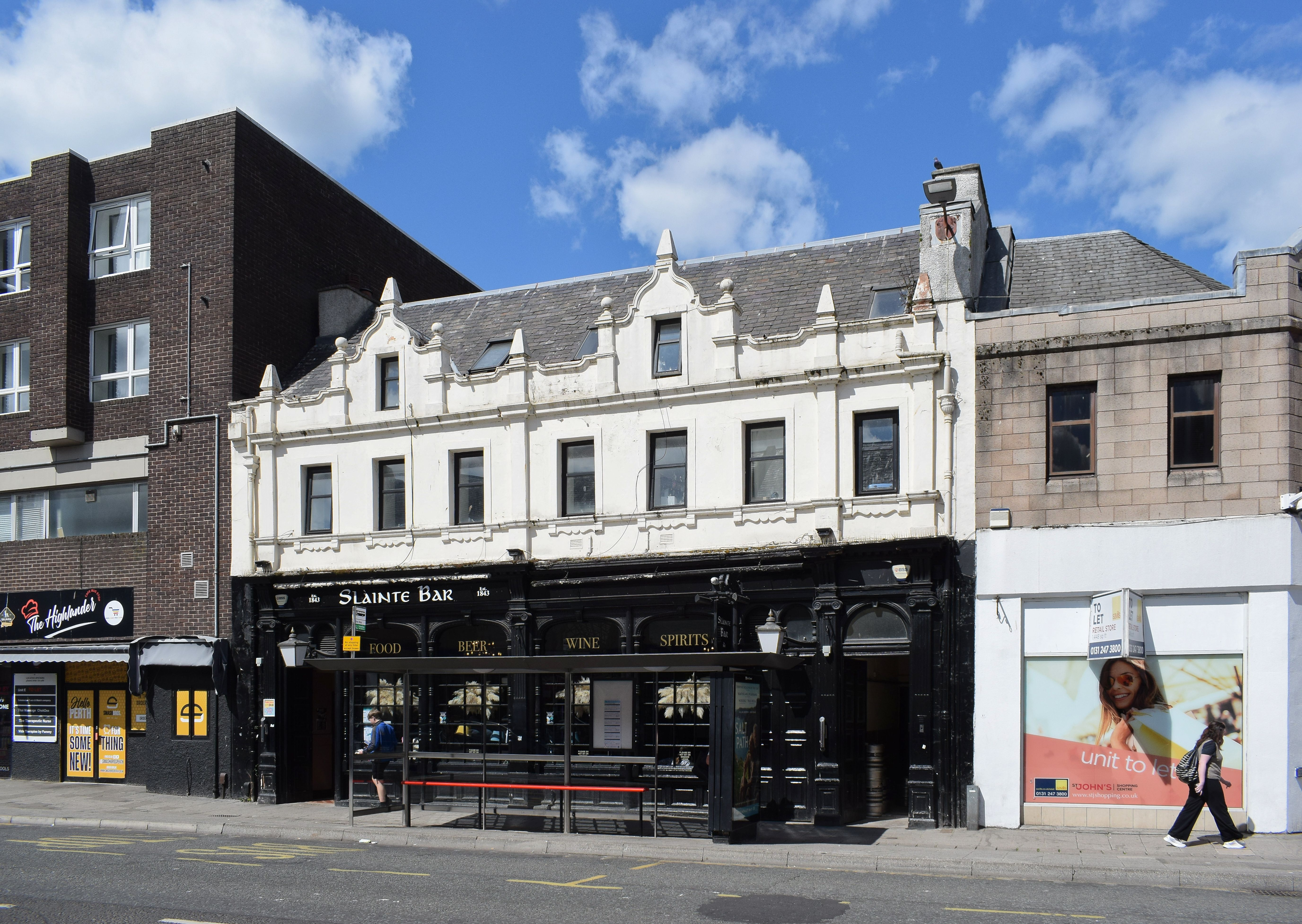
The Slainte Bar in Perth, Scotland

The word sláinte in Irish or slàinte in Scottish Gaelic means "health." As a drinking toast it is common in Ireland, Scotland and the Isle of Man, though also increasingly in other countries within the whiskey/whisky drinking community.

== Variations ==
Pronunciation
Language	Phrase	IPA
English	slainte	/ˈslɑːntʃə/ SLAHN-chə
Irish	sláinte (mhaith)	[ˈsˠl̪ˠaːn̠ʲtʲə (wa)]
Scots Gaelic	slàinte (mhath)	[ˈs̪l̪ˠaːɲtʲʰə (va)]
Scots Gaelic	do dheagh shlàinte	[t̪ə ʝoː ˈl̪ˠaːɲtʲʰə]
Scots Gaelic	slàinte mhòr	[ˈs̪l̪ˠaːɲtʲʰə voːɾ]
Manx	slaynt vie	[slentθ vaːi]
Manx	corp slaynt	[kʰoɾpʰ slentθ]

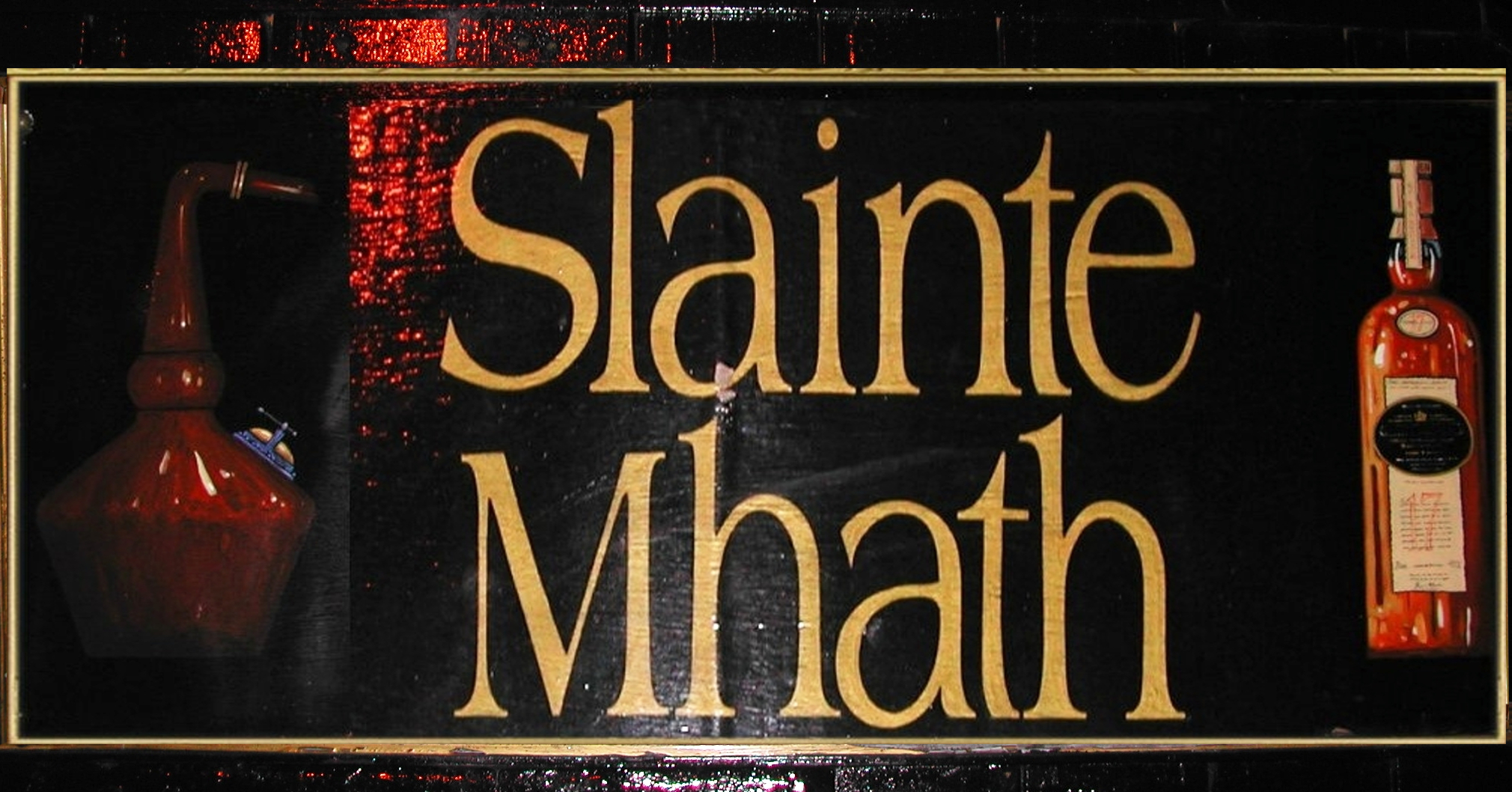
Sláinte Mhath—Good health—Bonne santé

Sláinte is the basic form in Irish. Variations of this toast include sláinte mhaith "good health" in Irish (mhaith being the lenited form of maith "good"). In Irish, the response to sláinte is sláinte agatsa, which translates "to your health as well".

The basic Scottish Gaelic equivalent is slàinte (mhath), with the same meaning, to which the normal response is do dheagh shlàinte "your good health". There are other variations such as:

- air do shlàinte "on your health!" with the response slàinte agad-sa "health at yourself!"
- slàinte mhòr "great health" which is also used as a Jacobite toast with the alternative meaning of "health to Marion", Marion (Mòr) being a Jacobite code name for Prince Charles Edward Stuart.

The Manx Gaelic form is slaynt (vie) or shoh slaynt. Alternatively, corp slaynt "healthy body" is also used in Manx.

== Etymology ==
The word is an abstract noun derived from the Old Irish adjective slán "whole, healthy" plus the Old Irish suffix tu, resulting in slántu "health" and eventually Middle Irish sláinte. The root slán is derived from the Indo-European root *slā- "advantageous" and linked to words like German selig "blessed" and the Latin salus "health," as well as the River Slaney in Ireland.

In some modern Romance languages, words descended from the Latin word salus (such as salute in Italian, salut in Catalan and Romanian, salud in Spanish) are similarly used as a toast. (However, sănătate in Romanian, santat in Occitan and santé in French are from Latin sanitas "health.")

== See also ==
- List of brief toasts worldwide
