= USS William P. Lawrence =

American guided missile destroyer

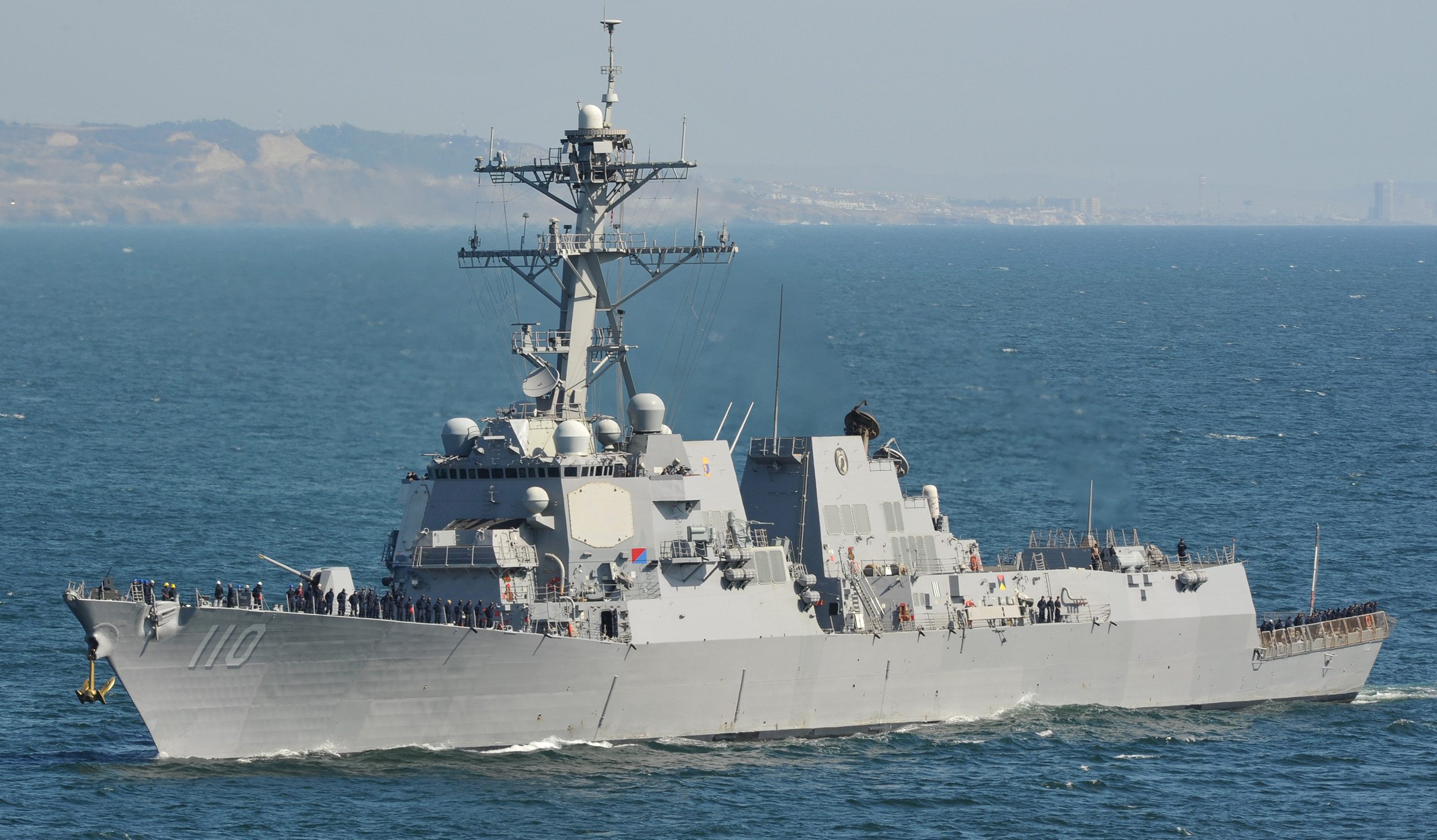
- USS William P. Lawrence in 2015

History

United States
- Name: William P. Lawrence
- Namesake: William P. Lawrence
- Ordered: 13 September 2002
- Builder: Northrop Grumman Shipbuilding
- Laid down: 16 September 2008
- Launched: 15 December 2009
- Christened: 17 April 2010
- Commissioned: 4 June 2011
- Home port: Pearl Harbor
- Identification: MMSI number: 360516189; Callsign: NGBU; Pennant number: DDG-110
- Motto: Never Give In!
- Nickname(s): The William P.; WPL
- Status: in active service
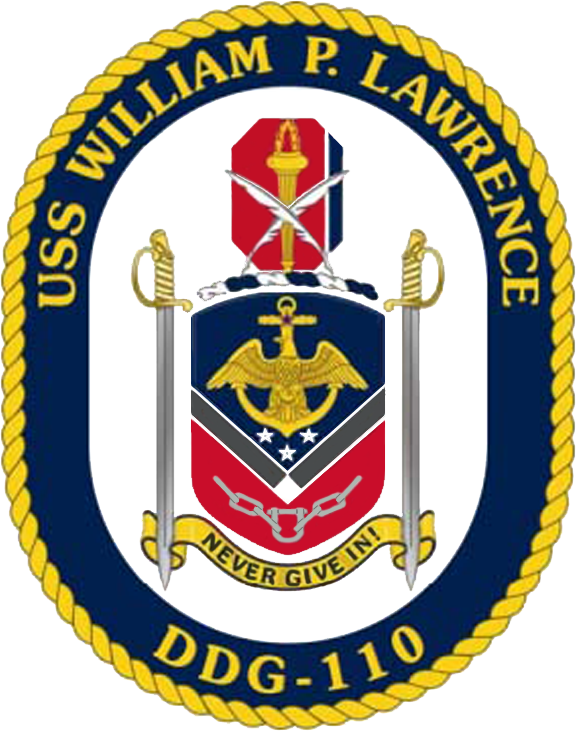
- Badge

General characteristics
- Class & type: Arleigh Burke-class destroyer
- Displacement: 9,200 tons
- Length: 509 ft 6 in (155.30 m)
- Beam: 66 ft (20 m)
- Draft: 31 ft (9.4 m)
- Propulsion: 4 × General Electric LM2500-30 gas turbines; 2 shafts; 100,000 shp (75,000 kW)
- Speed: exceeds 30 knots (56 km/h; 35 mph)
- Complement: 380 officers and enlisted
- Armament: Guns: 1 × 5-inch (127 mm)/62 Mk 45 Mod 4 (lightweight gun); 1 × 20 mm (0.8 in) Phalanx CIWS; 2 × 25 mm (0.98 in) Mk 38 machine gun system; 4 × 0.50 in (12.7 mm) caliber guns; Missiles: 1 × 32-cell, 1 × 64-cell (96 total cells) Mk 41 vertical launching system (VLS): RIM-66M surface-to-air missile; RIM-156 surface-to-air missile; RIM-174A Standard ERAM; RIM-161 anti-ballistic missile; RIM-162 ESSM (quad-packed); BGM-109 Tomahawk cruise missile; RUM-139 vertical launch ASROC; Torpedoes: 2 × Mark 32 triple torpedo tubes: Mark 46 lightweight torpedo; Mark 50 lightweight torpedo; Mark 54 lightweight torpedo
- Aircraft carried: 2 × MH-60R Seahawk helicopters

USS William P. Lawrence (DDG-110) is an Arleigh Burke-class (Flight IIA) Aegis guided missile destroyer in the United States Navy and was built by Northrop Grumman Shipbuilding. The ship is named for Vice Admiral William P. Lawrence (1930–2005), a naval aviator, fighter pilot, test pilot, Mercury astronaut finalist, Vietnam War prisoner of war, a U.S. Third Fleet commander, a Chief of Naval Personnel, and a Superintendent of the U.S. Naval Academy.

== Construction ==
William P. Lawrence's keel was laid down on 16 September 2008, at the Ingalls Shipbuilding Shipyard, in Pascagoula, Mississippi. William P. Lawrence was launched on 15 December 2009, and she was christened on 17 April 2010, sponsored by Vice Admiral Lawrence's widow, Diane Lawrence, and his daughters, Dr. Laurie Lawrence and Captain Wendy Lawrence (USN Ret, and former Space Shuttle astronaut). The ship was commissioned at the Port of Mobile, Alabama, on 4 June 2011.

== Ship history ==
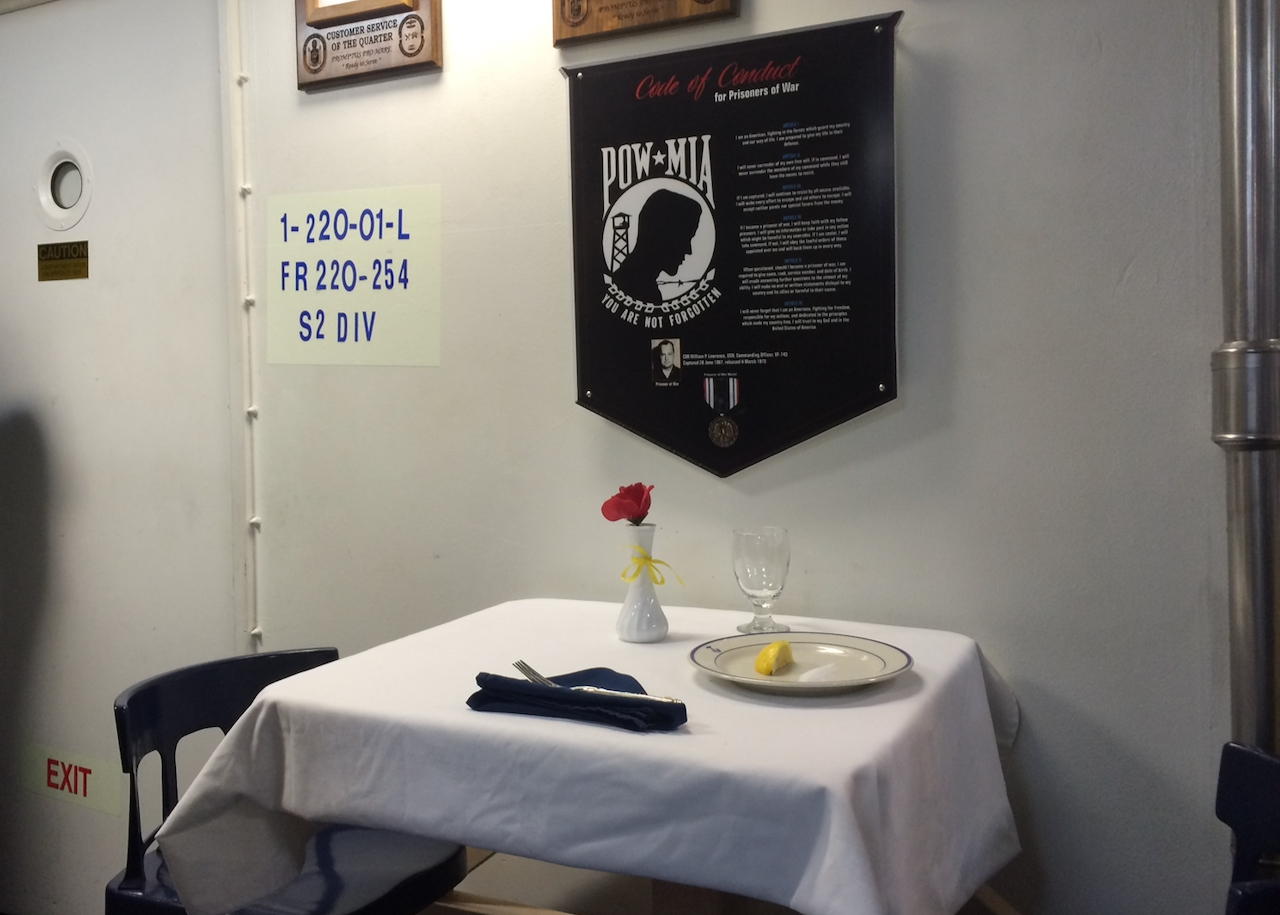
Missing man table aboard William P. Lawrence.

William P. Lawrence departed Naval Station San Diego, California, on 14 January 2013, for her first overseas deployment as part of a four-ship surface action group from Carrier Strike Group 11.

On 1 March 2013, William P. Lawrence entered the Persian Gulf for operations with Carrier Strike Group 3. On 11 March 2013, the ship rendered assistance to a burning vessel while operating in the Strait of Hormuz. In April 2013, on two separate occasions, William P. Lawrence joined the French frigate Montcalm in rendering assistance to civilian mariners in distress while operating in the Gulf of Oman, as part of Combined Task Force 150. Starting 2 September 2013, William P. Lawrence began operating in the Red Sea, as part of Carrier Strike Group 11.

On 22 September 2013, a large wave hit a helicopter and pushed it into the Red Sea shortly after it landed on William P. Lawrence, resulting in the death of two pilots. The vessel was moving at flank speeds to relieve another escort ship in a defensive screen around Carrier Strike Group 3 in U.S. Central Command. The wave came over the starboard side of the flight deck and struck the helicopter less than ten minutes after landing and being chocked and chained (red deck), with rotors still spinning. The other three aircrew members were rescued.

On 10 May 2016, the US Navy reported that the ship sailed close to the Fiery Cross Reef, as part of a planned series of Freedom of navigation operations, (also referred to as FONOPs) in the area. The operation prompted the PRC to express "dissatisfaction and opposition"; a Pentagon spokesperson said that the operation was undertaken to challenge the "excessive maritime claims by China, Taiwan, and Vietnam which were seeking to restrict navigation rights in the South China Sea."

In 2016, the ship was part of Destroyer Squadron 21.

As of October 2020, the ship was assigned to the United States Fourth Fleet supporting Joint Interagency Task Force South. In November 2020, she served as an off-shore base for MH-60R Seahawk helicopters of HSM-37 conducting disaster relief operations in the aftermath of Hurricane Eta.

William P. Lawrence participated in RIMPAC 2022.

== POW/MIA table ==
Even within the cramped confines of a Navy ship, William P. Lawrence honors her namesake's experience as a prisoner of war by maintaining a missing man table in the ship's mess.
