= Missing man table =

Type of American military memorial

POW/MIA flag

A missing man table, also known as a fallen comrade table, is a ceremony and memorial that is set up in military dining facilities of the United States and Canadian Armed Forces and during official dining functions, in honor of fallen, missing, or imprisoned military service members. The table serves as the focal point of ceremonial remembrance, originally growing out of US concern of the Vietnam War POW/MIA issue.

== Observance ==
The missing man table may be a permanent display in dining facilities, and is also traditionally part of military dining-in ceremonies and service balls. The ceremony may also be performed in conjunction with Veterans Day and Memorial Day services.

== Description ==
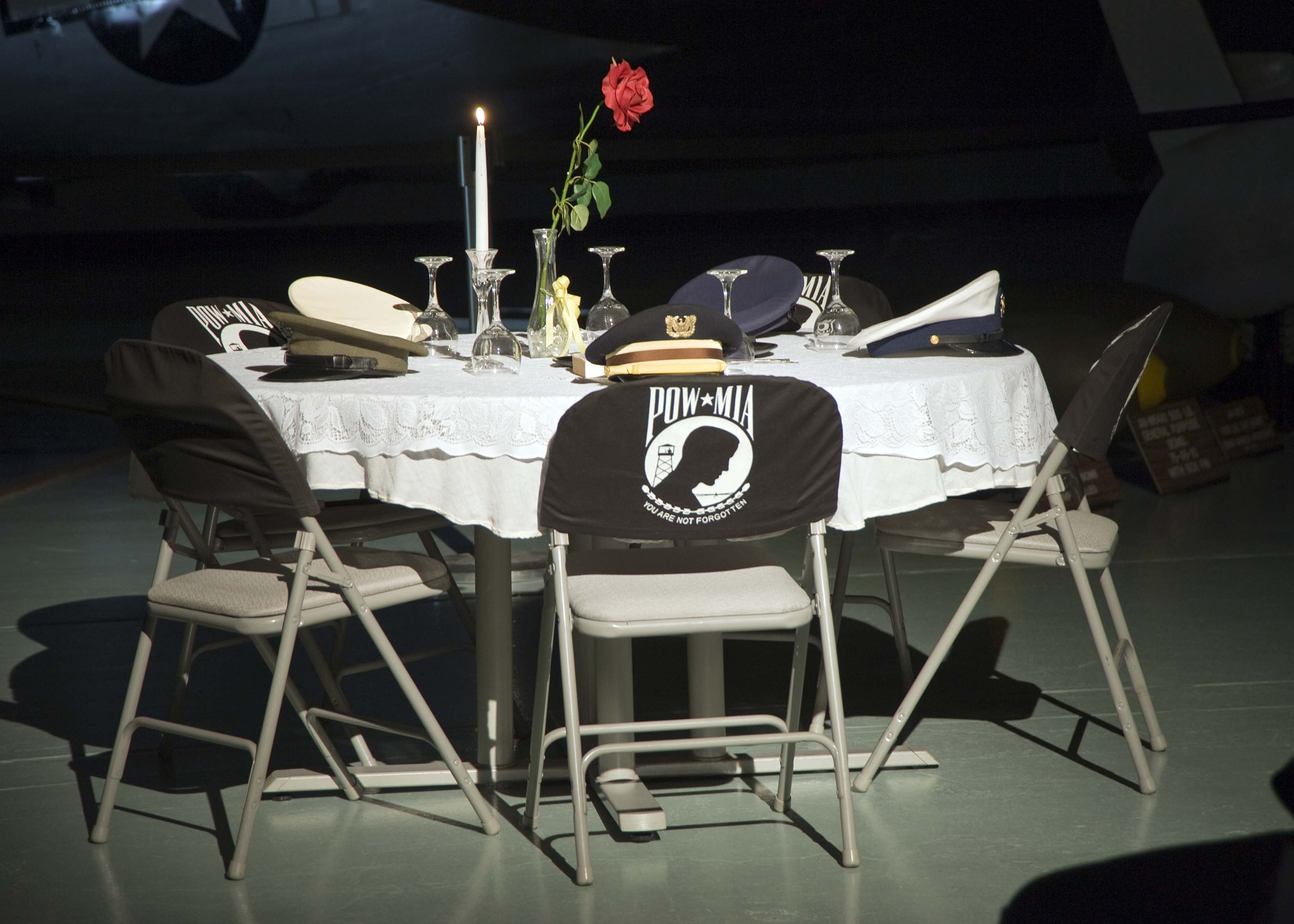
A missing man table featured during a 2009 ceremony at Eglin Air Force Base.

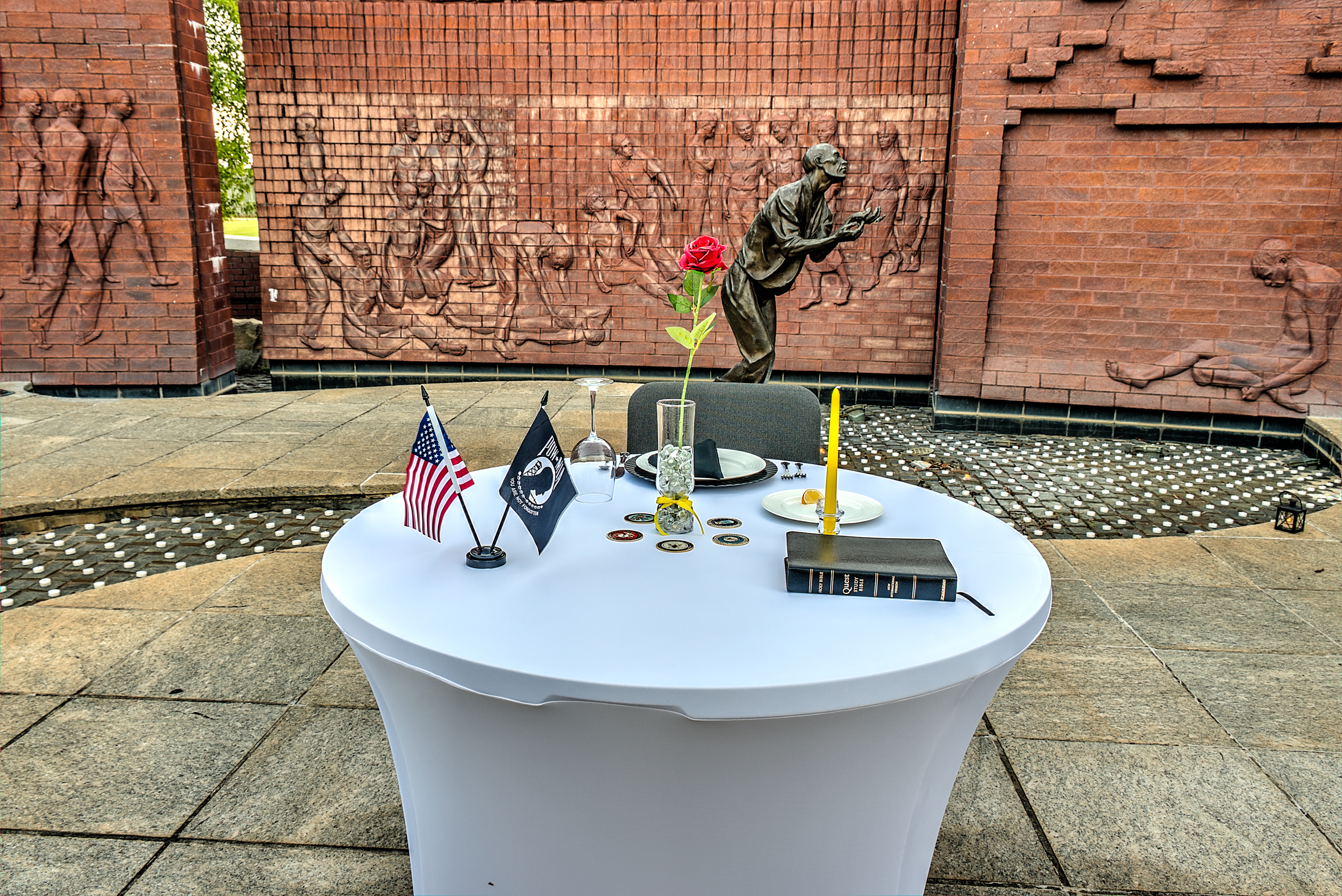
A missing man table featured during POW/MIA Recognition Day at Andersonville Prison

The missing man table consists of the following elements:

- A small table set for one, symbolizing the isolation of the absent service member. The table is usually set close to, or within sight of, the entrance to the dining room. For large events, the missing man table may be set for seven places representing each of the six armed services (Army, Navy, Marine Corps, Air Force, Space Force, and Coast Guard), with the seventh symbolizing the civilians who died during armed conflict. If space allows, a round table is used to represent the everlasting concern the survivors have for the missing.
- One or more head covers may be placed upon the table to represent the armed service of the missing persons.
- A white tablecloth to symbolize the pure intentions of the service members who responded to the country's call to arms.
- A single rose in the vase symbolizing the blood that service members have shed in sacrifice to ensure the freedom of the United States of America. This rose also represents the family and friends who keep the faith while awaiting the return of the missing service members.
- The yellow ribbon represents a love of country that inspired the service members to serve the country.
- A slice of lemon on the bread plate that represents the bitter fate of the missing.
- Salt sprinkled on the bread plate that symbolizes the tears shed by waiting families.
- An inverted glass to represent the fact that the missing and fallen cannot partake.
- A lit candle symbolizes a light of hope that lives in hearts to illuminate the missing's way home.
- An empty chair to represent the absence of the missing and fallen.

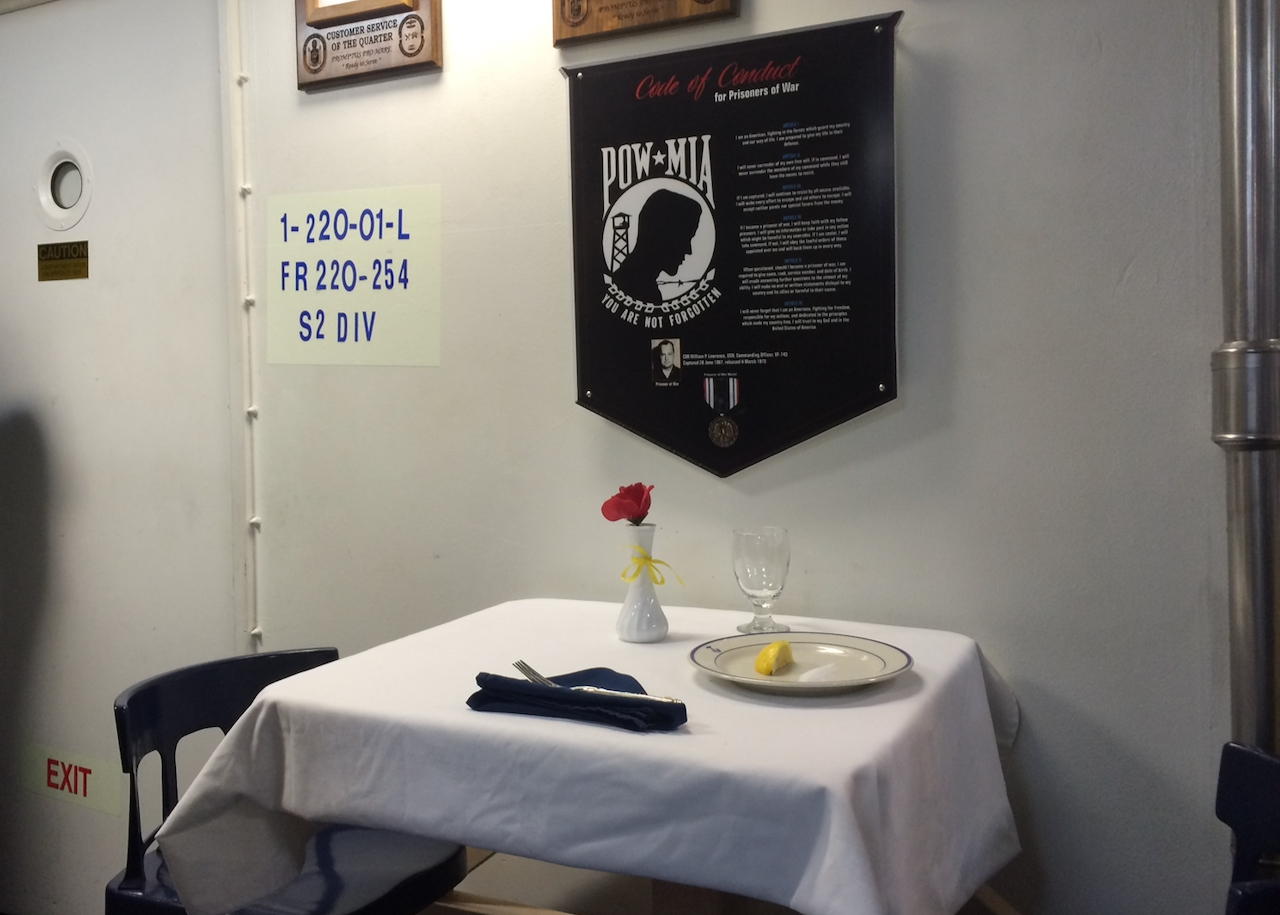
USS William P. Lawrence honors her namesake with a missing man table.

The elements are tradition, not prescribed. Individual displays may differ depending on the availability, practicality, and appropriateness of the various elements in a particular venue. For instance, private displays by individuals or groups may include a book of faith. The inclusion of the Bible in public (publicly funded installations) displays has been challenged due to violations of the First Amendment and DoD Instruction resulting in its removal.
