= Clinking glasses =

Drinking ritual

Cartoon images of clinking beer mugs

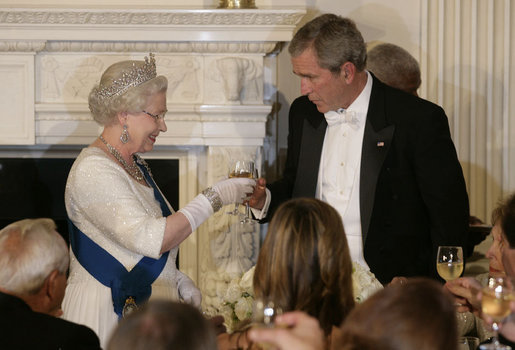
George W. Bush and Queen Elizabeth II clink wine glasses

Clinking glasses is a drinking ritual where the participants make contact between their drinking vessels, producing bell-like sounds in order to express congratulations or greetings, Clinking is more likely after a toast that involves a subject of joint interest (like the just-wedded couple).

== Symbolism ==
The origin of the tradition is unknown. One explanation suggests that spilling a neighbor's drink and letting some of it get into one's own glass was a demonstration of the absence of poison. In medieval France, people would clink glasses and then swap them, a variation of this explanation is that clinking indicated declining the suggested swap. Another theory derives the custom from the belief that the sounds of colliding vessels force the evil spirits out of alcohol, similar in function to the beliefs about the church bells in the past (thus suggesting that the ritual started in the Christian era). Warding off the evil spirits is also offered as an explanation for the "clink before you drink" rule.

Yet another rationale for the custom is that when drinking wine, four of the five senses (vision, touch, taste, smell) are already naturally involved. Adding sound for hearing completes the harmony. The clinking can also be considered as a symbol of passing a single cup of wine in the distant past: by bringing the glasses together, the participants are reminded that wine, now poured into separate glasses, used to be shared. The fact that wine in all glasses is the same (unlike, say, pieces of meat) emphasizes the sharing and friendship; clinking can be thought of as an act briefly reuniting the wine to symbolize this meaning.

== Acceptance ==
Acceptance of clinking varies by culture. For example, the habit of clinking glasses is a standard behavior in the Russian culture, rejected in the Japanese one, attitude toward clinking in most European cultures is cautious: clinking glasses is considered to be difficult in large groups and might damage the glasses. As late as 1911, clinking glasses was considered by Englishmen to be a "foreign habit". Etiquette books in English recommend first observing the host (who may want to preserve his crystal and avoid clinking glasses), and then acting the way the host does. In rare cases when clinking is done in a large group, it usually occurs between the neighbors. In any case, the books recommend to clink glasses very carefully.

In Western culture, the wedding guests will often clink their glasses during dinner to ask the newlyweds to stand up and kiss. Some couples pass out wedding favor bells for guests to ring instead of clinking glasses.

== Sound ==
The sound of an individual glass being stricken is a superposition of multiple resonant frequencies. When two similar glasses are clinked, and kept in close proximity, due to their resonant frequencies being close, but not equal, they produce "acoustic beat", a periodic (in time) variation of the sound volume.

According to Margaret Visser, clinking popularity grew up in the 17th century, when individual glasses became common due to the progress made by the Venetian glassmakers of the 16th century. The wine glasses were always valued also for their sound (the "ring"), which was better when large quantity of the lead(II) oxide was present in the glassmaking material (lead crystal), like in the British and Irish wine glasses of the 17th-19th centuries with their "rich bell-notes of F and G sharp".

== Sources ==
- Anderson, Charles (1984). "the Exchange". RQ. 24 (2). American Library Association: 139–141. ISSN 0033-7072. JSTOR 25827334.
- Boswell, S. (2007). "Clinking Glasses". Protocol Matters: Cultivating Social Graces in Christian Homes and Schools. Canon Press. ISBN 978-1-59128-025-5.
- Bridges, J.; Curtis, B. (2012). "The Tradition of the Toast". Toasts & Tributes: A Gentleman's Guide to Personal Correspondence and the Noble Tradition of the Toast. Gentlemanners book. Thomas Nelson. p. 18. ISBN 978-1-4016-0467-7.
- Bridges, J.; Curtis, B. (2012b). "A Clink, Not a Crash". Toasts & Tributes: A Gentleman's Guide to Personal Correspondence and the Noble Tradition of the Toast. Gentlemanners book. Thomas Nelson. ISBN 978-1-4016-0467-7.
- Chetwynd, J. (2013). The Book of Nice. Workman Publishing Company. ISBN 978-0-7611-7690-9.
- Dickson, Paul (2017). "A Brief History of Raised Glasses". Toasts: Over 1,500 of the Best Toasts, Sentiments, Blessings, and Graces. Book Sales. pp. 5–24. ISBN 978-0-7858-3569-1.
- Kasper, Lutz (2024). "Experiment 16. Cheers! Beat frequencies when clinking glasses". Uncorking the Physics of Wine: A Wine Tasting in 50 Experiments. Springer Berlin Heidelberg, Imprint: Springer. pp. 46–48. ISBN 978-3-662-68759-8.
- Kasper, Lutz (2024b). "Experiment 15. Frequency of Wine Glasses". Uncorking the Physics of Wine: A Wine Tasting in 50 Experiments. Springer Berlin Heidelberg, Imprint: Springer. pp. 42–45. ISBN 978-3-662-68759-8.
- Kron, R. (1911). The Little Londoner ... J. Bielefeld.
- Martin, Judith (2005). Miss Manners' Guide to Excruciatingly Correct Behavior. New York: W.W. Norton & Co. ISBN 0-393-05874-3.
- Martin, Scott C., ed. (2014). "Toast". The SAGE Encyclopedia of Alcohol: Social, Cultural, and Historical Perspectives. SAGE Publications. ISBN 978-1-4833-7438-3.
- McCollister, Julia (2004). "Ring Out Them Bells!". Echoes from the Smithsonian: America's History Brought to Life. Sports Publishing, LLC. ISBN 978-1-58261-245-4.
- Mescheryakov, A. N. (2003). "Саке" [Sake]. Книга японских символов [Book of Japanese Symbols] (in Russian). Moscow: Natalis. pp. 419–431. Archived from the original on September 11, 2018.
- O'Hair, D.; Wiemann, M. (2012). Real Communication: An Introduction. Bedford/St. Martin's. ISBN 978-0-312-64420-8.
- Ushakov, D. N., ed. (1940). "чокаться" [clink glasses]. Толковый словарь русского языка [Explanatory Dictionary of the Russian Language] (in Russian). Vol. 4. Moscow: OGIZ.
- Visser, M. (2015). The Rituals of Dinner: The Origins, Evolution, Eccentricities, and Meaning of Table Manners. Open Road Media. ISBN 978-1-5040-1169-3.
- "Традиция чокаться бокалами (рюмками)" [Tradition of Clinking Glasses]. Алкогольные напитки и культура пития. Систематическая энциклопедия от Алкофана [Alcoholic Drinks and Drinking Culture : A Systematic Encyclopedia by Alcofan] (in Russian). LitRes. 2022. pp. 53–54. ISBN 978-5-04-096130-6.
