= Loyal toast =

Salute to the monarch

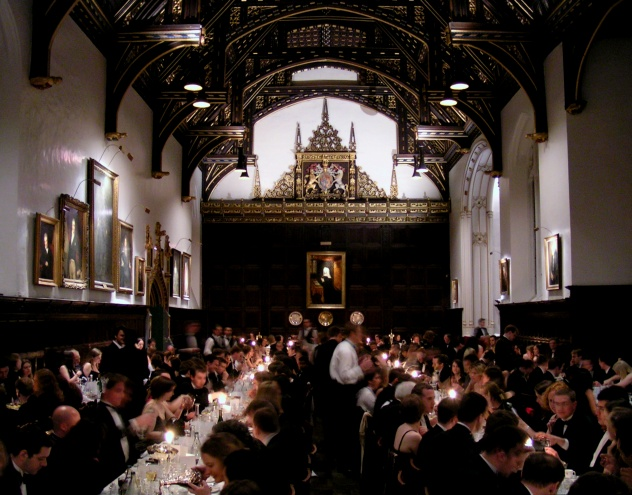
A formal occasion at St John's College, Cambridge, where, beneath the Royal Coat of Arms of the United Kingdom, the loyal toast would be given.

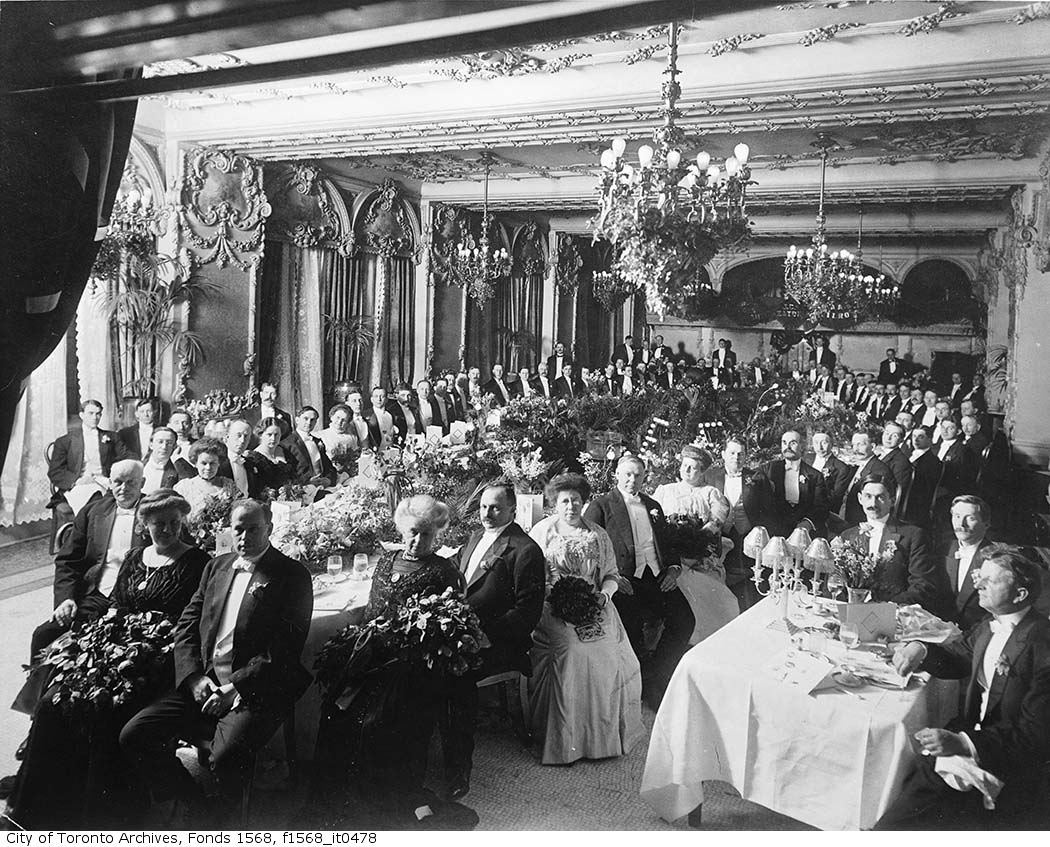
A dinner hosted by John Craig Eaton at the King Edward Hotel in Toronto in 1919; the loyal toast would have been given to King George V.

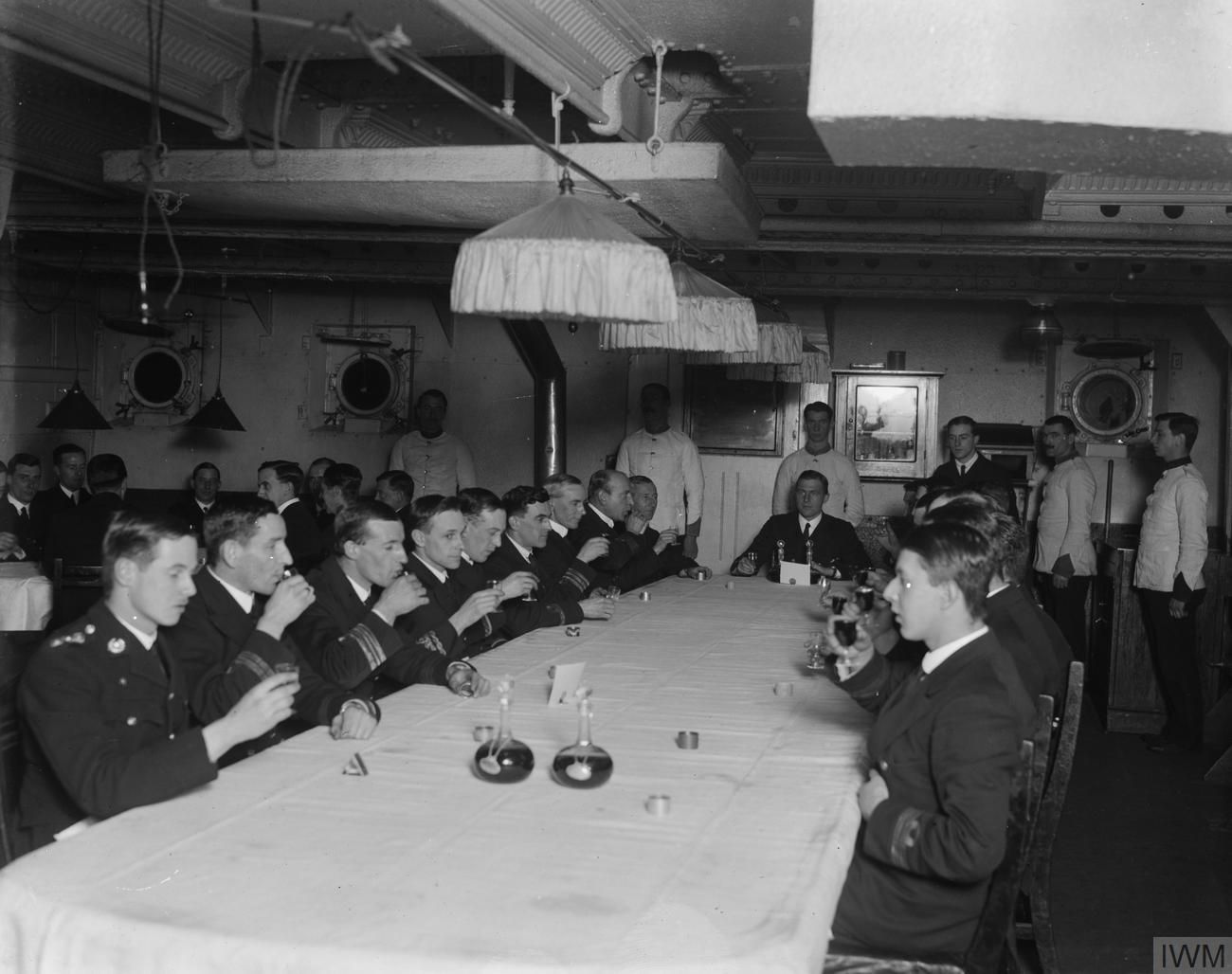
Royal Navy officers in a wardroom seated toasting the King, from a series titled 'The Royal Navy during the Second World War'.

A loyal toast is a salute given to the sovereign monarch or head of state of the country in which a formal gathering is being given, or by expatriates of that country, whether or not the particular head of state is present. It is usually a matter of protocol at state and military occasions, and a display of patriotic sentiment at civilian events. The toast is usually initiated and recited by the host before being repeated by the assembled guests in unison; the composition varying between regions and types of gathering. There is sometimes a tradition of smashing a glass used for a loyal toast, so that no lesser toast can be made with it.

== Commonwealth realms ==
Throughout the Commonwealth realms, the loyal toast is most commonly composed solely of the words "The Queen" or "The King" (as appropriate), though this may be elaborated with mention of the monarch's position as head of a particular state, such as in Canada, where the Canadian Armed Forces codifies the loyal toast as "Ladies and gentlemen, the King of Canada". If the sovereign holds an honorary position within a Canadian Forces regiment, in that regiment's mess the toast is: "Ladies and gentlemen, the King of Canada, our Captain-General", or whatever rank the monarch may hold. In Australia federally and in some states, the loyal salute is typically "The King and the People of Australia". The phrase "and the People of Australia" was added in the 1990s by governor-general Sir William Deane.

As King Charles III is recognised as the symbolic head of the Commonwealth of Nations, at any event where the guest of honour is a dignitary from any of the fifteen Commonwealth realms, the loyal toast is adapted to be "Ladies and gentlemen, the King, Head of the Commonwealth", and should an honoured guest be from one of the other Commonwealth member-states, the loyal toast is to be recited as "Ladies and gentlemen, the King of Canada, Head of the Commonwealth".

Other unique cases exist in places such as Lancashire, where the salute may be "Ladies and gentlemen, The King, Duke of Lancaster"; in Jersey, where residents will informally say "L'Rouai, nouotre Duc" ("The King, our Duke") in Jèrriais; on the Isle of Man, where "The King, Lord of Mann", is said and at Oriel College, Oxford where members toast to "The King, our Visitor". Similarly, whilst the Loyal Toast is traditionally the first given, it is often the final toast given at official debate dinners at the Oxford Union, following those to the speakers, Committee, and Members.

Members of the Royal Family may neither participate in nor respond to the loyal toast, and the honour may be followed by a playing of "God Save The King", which is either the national or royal anthem of most Commonwealth realms. When ambassadors or similarly senior representatives of other heads of state are present, it has become customary for a toast to be proposed after the loyal toast to "heads of state of other countries here represented". The toast can be adapted for use at some royal foundations. For example, at Christ Church, Oxford, the first toast is always "The King, Visitor of Christ Church".

Official etiquette dictates that the loyal toast may be given following either the introduction of honoured guests and opening remarks, or the completion of all courses of the meal, that it be the first toast given, and that a glass of any beverage other than a cocktail be used. It is also customary not to smoke until the sovereign has been toasted. In carrying out the toast, the event's host will rise and request the audience's attention. Once accomplished and the guests are standing, the host raises his or her glass and recites the toast without any other words or music. The audience then responds to the toast by repeating "The King" or, in Canada, "Le roi", drinking the toast, and seating themselves once more.

In the Royal Navy, however, the toast is given with all attendees seated, a custom practised since King William IV, who had served as a naval officer and experienced the discomfort of banging his head whilst standing suddenly on board a vessel at sea, authorised all in the navy to toast him while sitting down. This practice is also carried out on board the ships of the Royal Canadian Navy, so long as neither the King nor any other member of the Canadian Royal Family is present, in which case the toast is given while sitting only if the royal guest so requests it.

At Christ's College, Cambridge, the loyal toast is taken sitting down, which fellows of the college have attributed to the ambivalent attitude of their predecessors to King Charles I. The lawyers of Lincoln's Inn also traditionally take the toast sitting down, a custom dating to the reign of British king Charles II.

In the British Army, several units have special privileges, and are exempted from the usual practice of standing up for the toast. For example, the Royal Scots Dragoon Guards are allowed to remain seated, while officers of The Queen's Royal Hussars in their Mess have the privilege of not drinking the loyal toast and of ignoring the National Anthem when it is played at dinner.

During the annual Swan Upping ceremonies, the crews of the King's Swan Markers, alongside the Worshipful Companies of Vintners and Dyers, toast the monarch at various points on the journey with a measure of port, with the toast given as "The King, Seigneur of the swans".

=== In dispute ===
The loyal toast was the catalyst for international friction in 1948, when the Taoiseach (prime minister) of Ireland, then John A. Costello, made an official visit to Canada. There, at a formal function, Governor General of Canada The Viscount Alexander of Tunis steadfastly refused the directions of Irish officials to toast the President of Ireland, Seán T. O'Kelly, instead of the King of Ireland, George VI; at the time, the King fulfilled the external affairs role that normally belongs to heads of state, while the President of Ireland fulfilled an internal constitutional role. An irked Costello stated to a reporter the following day that he would prompt the Irish Parliament to repeal the Executive Authority Act, and declare Ireland as a republic, which was done later that year.

In 2000, Captain Aralt Mac Giolla Chainnigh, a professor at the Royal Military College of Canada, petitioned to be personally excused from, amongst other displays of loyalty, having to stand and participate in the loyal toast. The Canadian Forces Grievance Board, the Chief of the Defence Staff, and the Federal Court of Canada all upheld the Canadian Forces' requirements that members respect the Canadian head of state and Commander-in-Chief.

In Scottish Jacobite circles, special very fine glassware engraved with Jacobite symbols was made to toast Charles Edward Stuart, known as Bonnie Prince Charlie, the pretender to the thrones of England, Scotland, France, and Ireland; very little remains due to the tradition of smashing glasses after the toast so that they could not be used for a lesser toast. After the defeat of the Jacobites and the exile overseas of Bonnie Prince Charlie, Jacobite Scots would stand for the loyal toast to "the King" but pass their drink over a glass or jug of water on the table symbolising "the king over the water" instead of the British monarch, as a sign of solidarity with the Jacobite cause and a protest against the Hanoverian succession. Because of this, for many years, finger bowls were not used on British royal tables, as some people would pass the glass over the bowl. King Edward VII authorised the use of finger bowls during his reign, deeming his dynasty to be sufficiently secure.

== Spain ==
At formal occasions in the Spanish Armed Forces, the first toast is to the King of Spain. The highest-ranked officer toasts "Por el primer soldado de España" ("For Spain's first soldier"), and the concurrence answers "Por el Rey" ("For the King").

== Sweden ==
At the Nobel Banquet or other such formal events in Sweden, e.g. balls or banquets in the armed forces, the first toast is usually to the Swedish sovereign. It is proclaimed by the host or, if the host is the monarch himself, the second-highest-ranking official. It is simply "Hans Majestät Konungens skål" ("the toast of His Majesty the King"). All guests then rise, raise their glasses, and, if the sovereign is present, turn towards him and answer "Konungen" ("The King"). In wardrooms and officer's messes during formal dinners, the custom is that the Royal Hymn can be sung after the loyal toast, even when the king is not present.

== United States ==
At formal military social occasions, the first toast is traditionally to "the President of the United States", who is commander in chief of U.S. armed forces.

== See also ==
- Canadian royal symbols
- Honors music, including royal / presidential anthems and vice-regal salutes
