= Wardroom =

Naval mess for commissioned officers

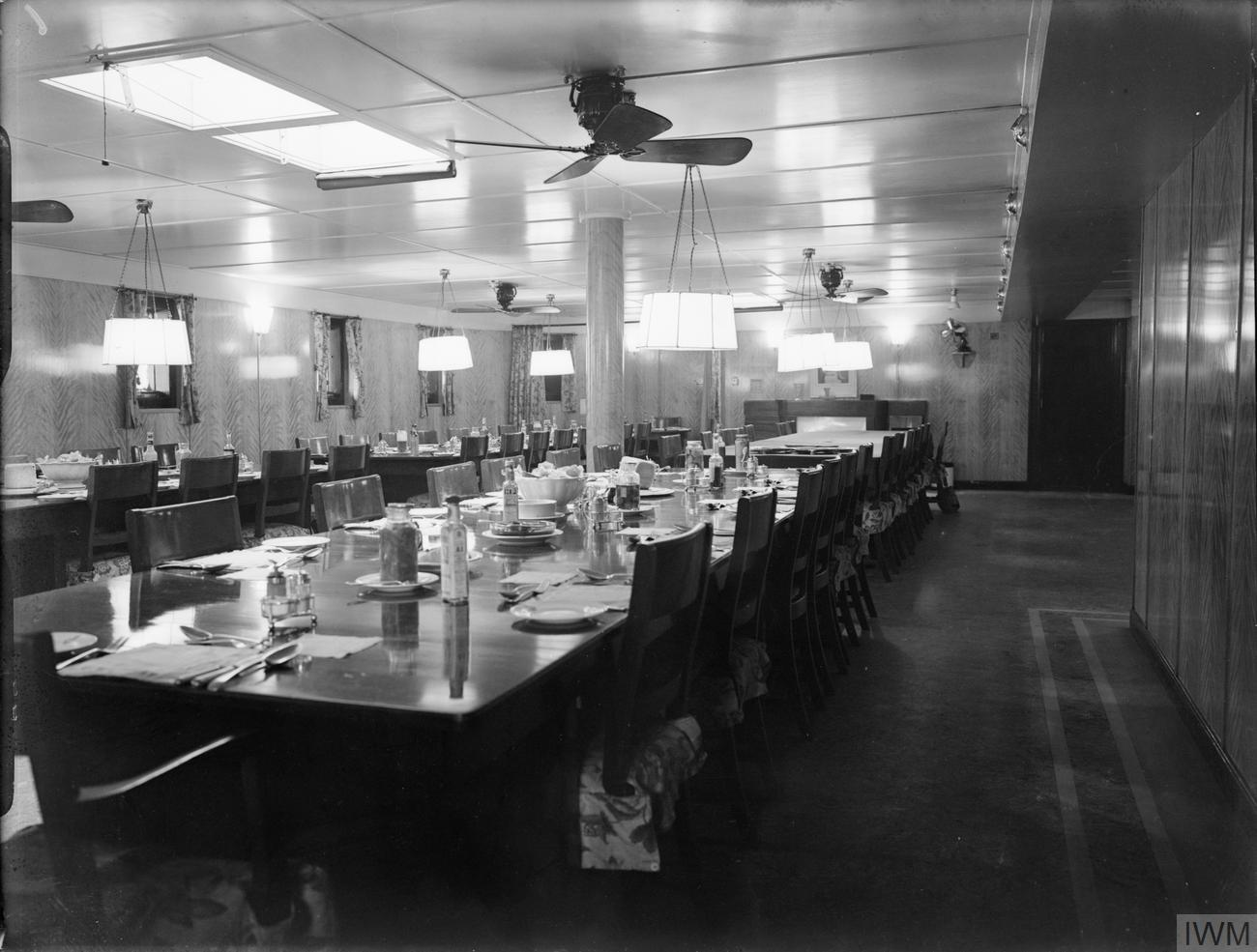
Wardroom of the Royal Navy submarine depot ship HMS Forth (A187), from a series titled 'The Royal Navy during the Second World War'.

The wardroom is the mess cabin or compartment for commissioned naval officers above the rank of midshipman on a warship or other military vessel. Although the term typically relates to officers in a navy, it is also applicable to marine officers and coast-guard officers in those countries that have such service branches. On larger vessels, such as aircraft carriers of the United States Navy, there may be more than one wardroom. The designation "wardroom" may also be used on stone frigates to refer to similar officer-mess facilities at naval, marine, and coast-guard installations ashore.

== Terminology ==
The term the wardroom is also used (metonymically) to refer to those individuals with the right to occupy that wardroom, meaning 'the officers of the wardroom'.

== Usage ==
The wardroom provides a place of rest, relaxation and recreation, as well as being an officers' dining room. Usually, a galley or scullery adjoins the wardroom. Table service is provided by stewards, who are now known in some services as mess specialists or culinary specialists.

On warships other than those of the US Navy, there is usually a bar where alcoholic drinks may be purchased. Ships may be either 'wet' or 'dry': the former allowing the consumption of alcohol whilst at sea (though may still be prohibited during action stations), and a dry ship allows alcohol to be consumed only when alongside at port, if at all. Ships of the United States Navy have not allowed alcohol consumption onboard since 1913 although since 1980, unique exceptional single-day waivers have been granted to vessels deployed in excess of 60 days without a port call.

== Etiquette ==
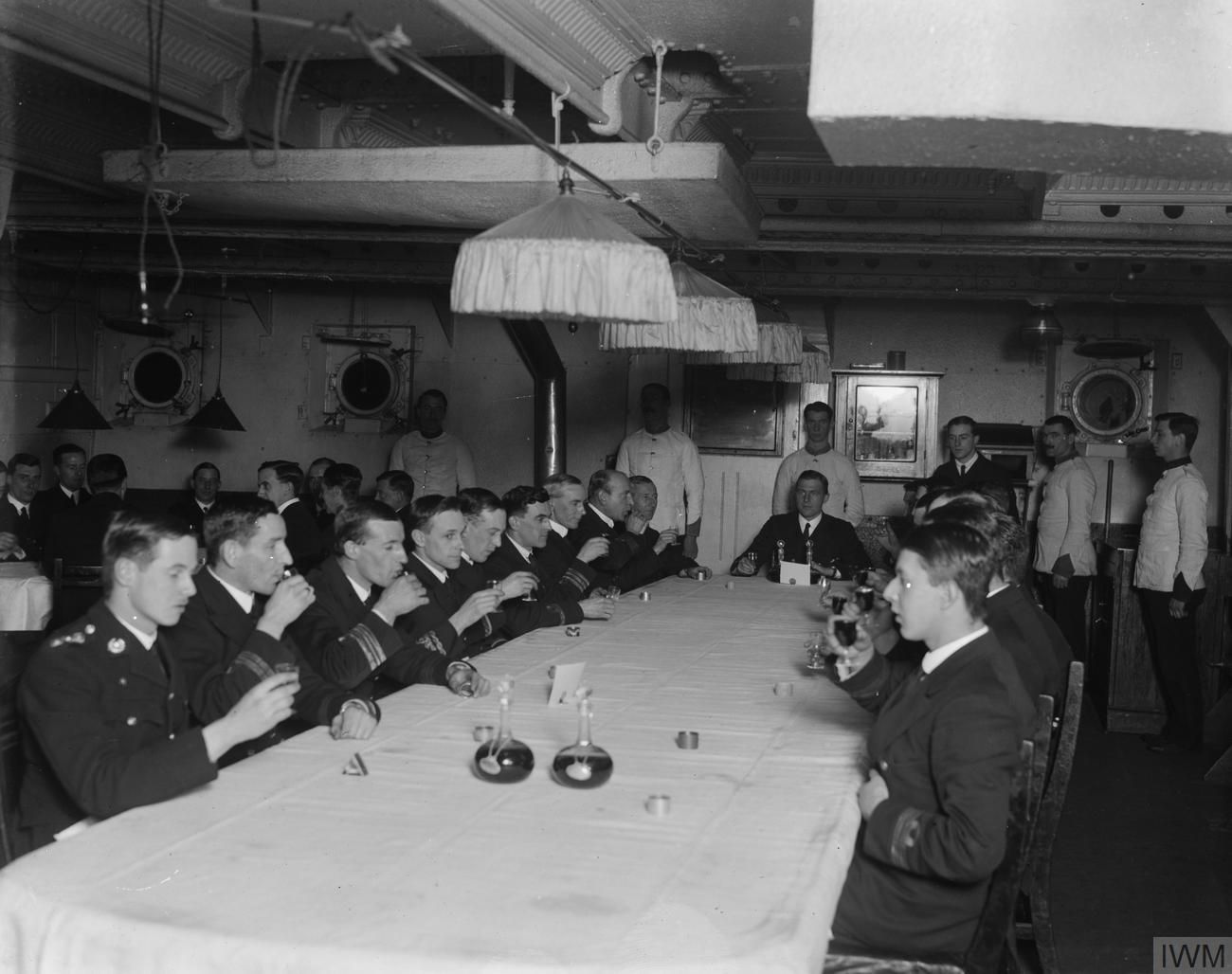
Royal Navy officers seated toasting the King, from a series titled 'The Royal Navy during the Second World War'.

Wardrooms have rules governing etiquette and military customs. Traditionally considered taboo are three topics: politics, religion, and sex (earlier guidebooks referred to the last as 'ladies', but that being changed as increasing numbers of female officers joined the wardrooms of warships and coast guard vessels). On large ships in peacetime, talking about professional business is also frowned upon. It is also considered inappropriate to perform work or meet with subordinates in a wardroom. Typically, upon entering the wardroom at meal time, members ask permission from the most senior officer present before joining the table.

The ship's executive officer is usually the mess president. On warships and coast guard vessels, the commanding officer is normally not a member of the wardroom but is invited to join the members for special occasions.

Of significant note in ships' wardrooms of the Royal Navy is the daily toast to the monarch. In all other circumstances and settings, those toasting the monarch would first rise to their feet and face the monarch before raising their glass and declaring their affirmation. In wardrooms of ships, officers remain seated to toast the monarch. The practice came about following the permission of King William IV; when the King (a former sailor) who was dining in a wardroom aboard a warship himself rose to return the compliment and banged his head because of to the low headroom height between warship decks of the period.

== Gallery ==
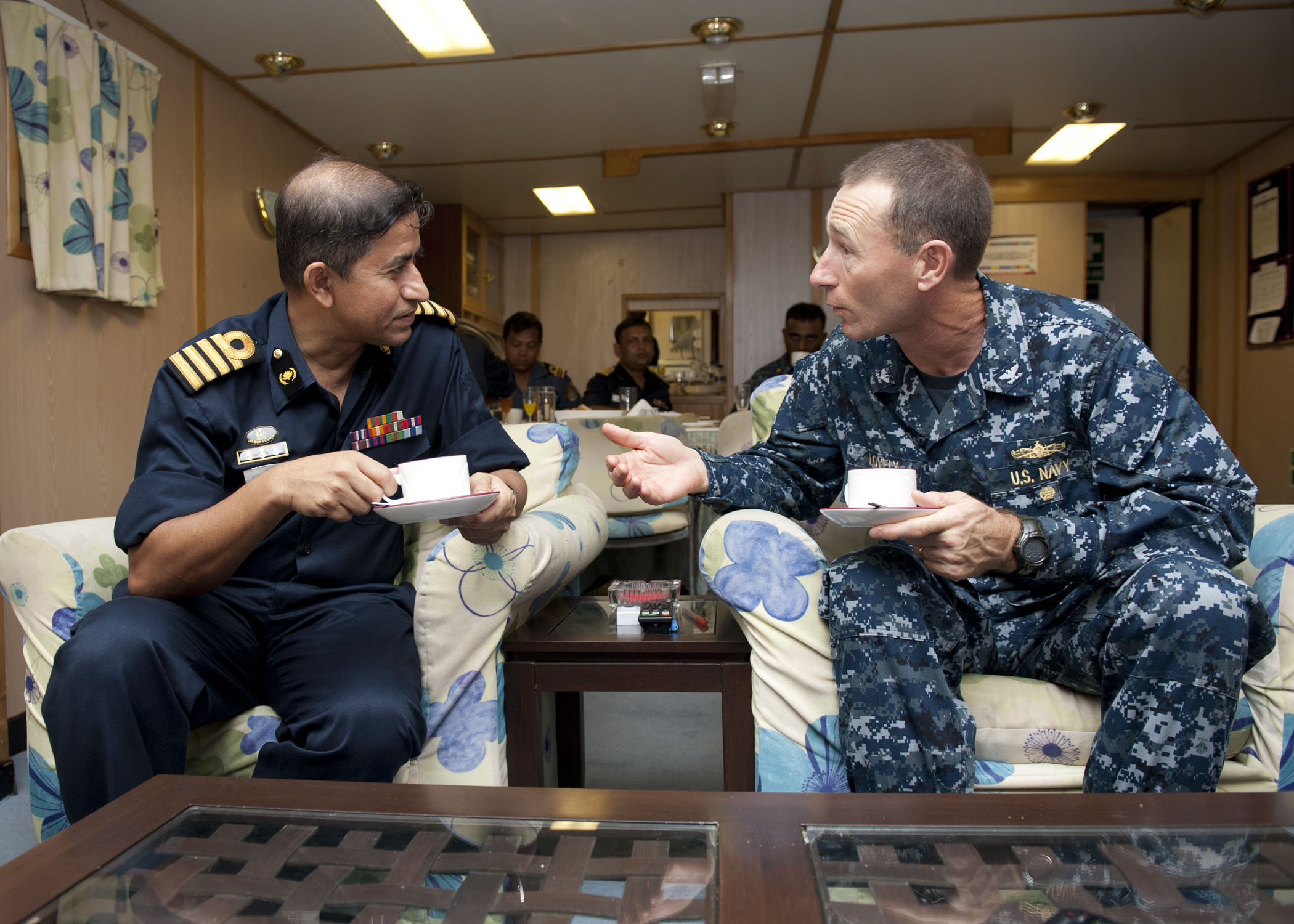
The wardroom on the Bangladesh Navy corvette BNS Bijoy

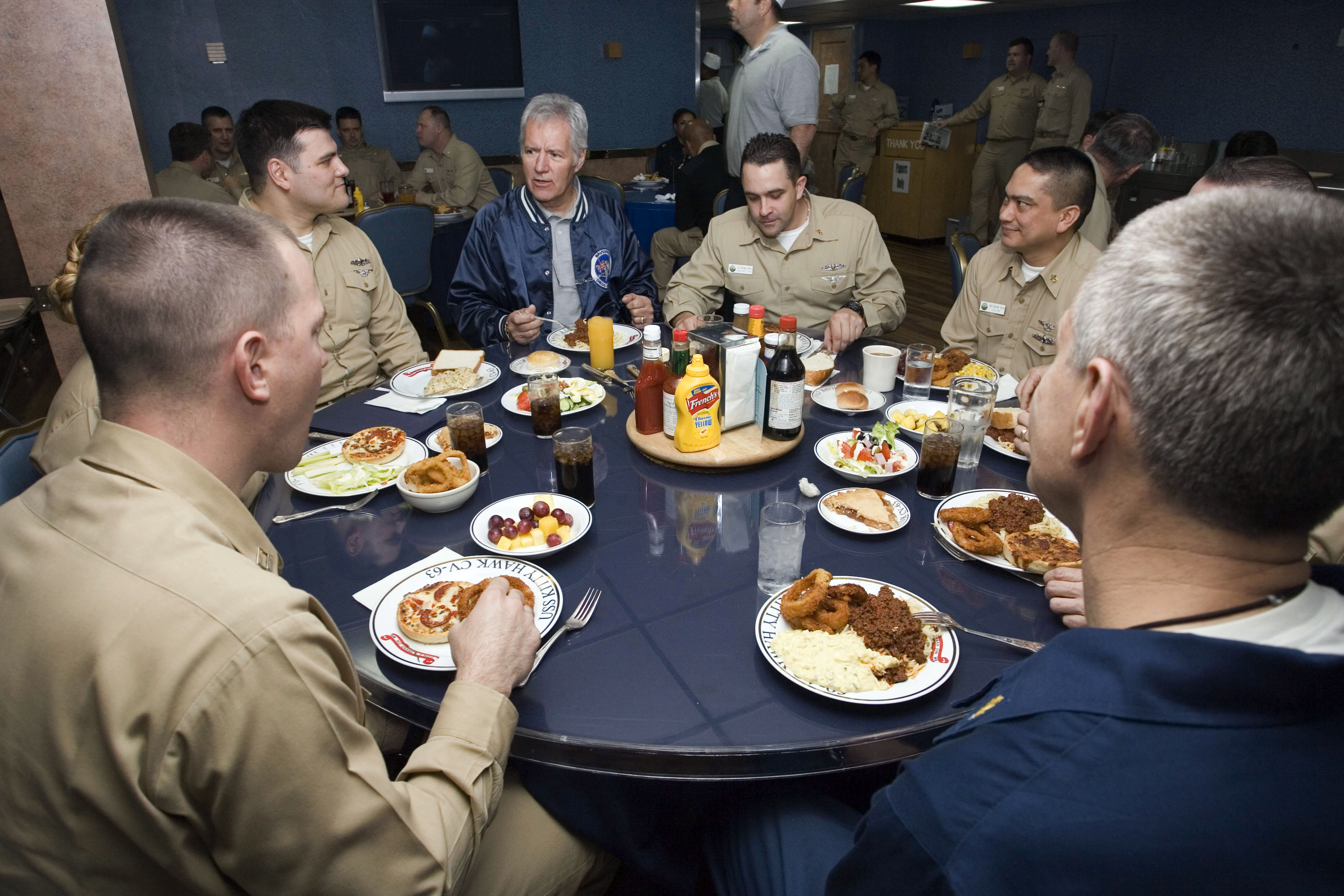
Alex Trebek in Wardroom II of the aircraft carrier USS Kitty Hawk (CV 63)

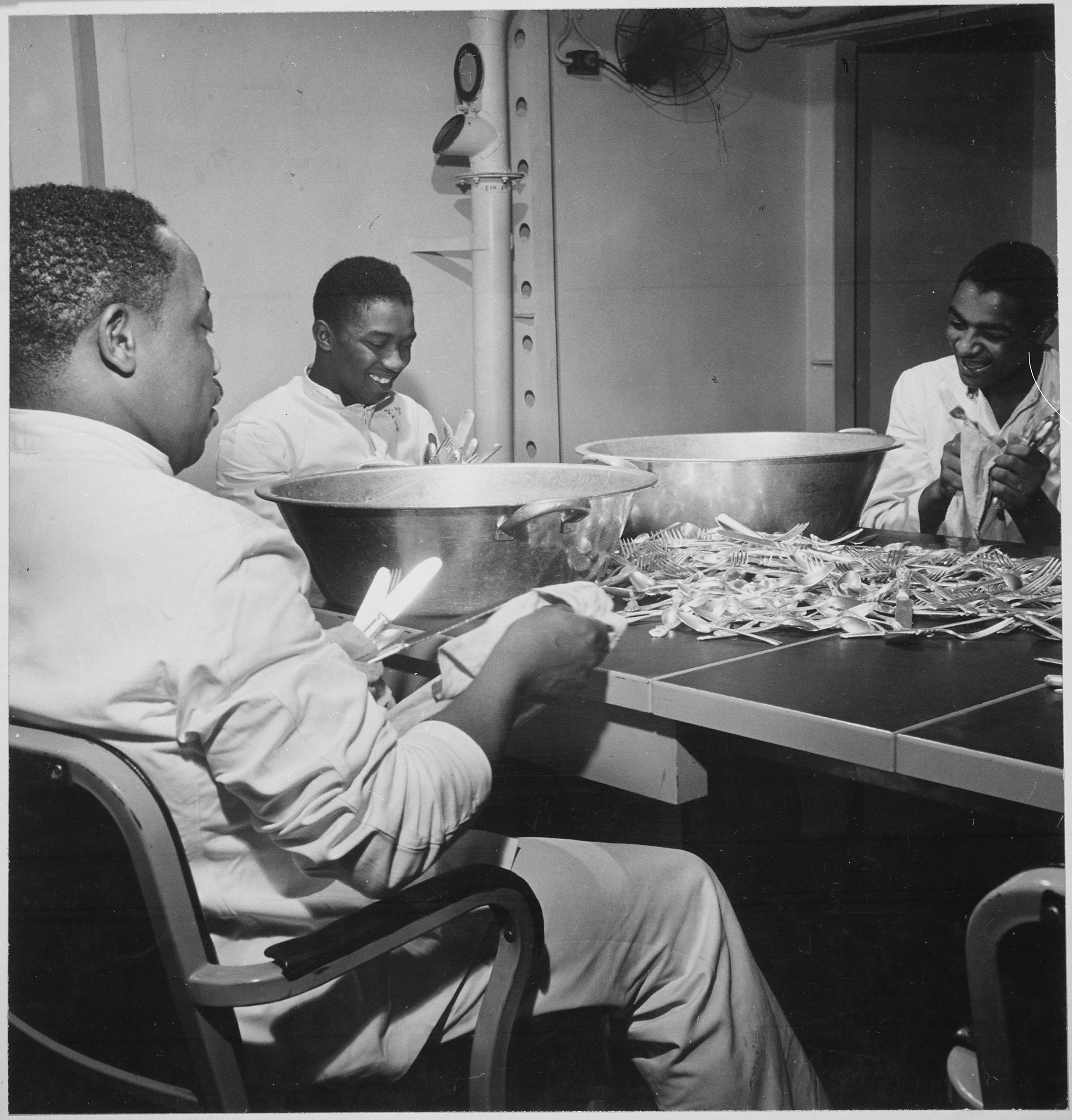
Steward's mates polishing silverware in the wardroom of the former aircraft carrier USS Ticonderoga (CV 14)

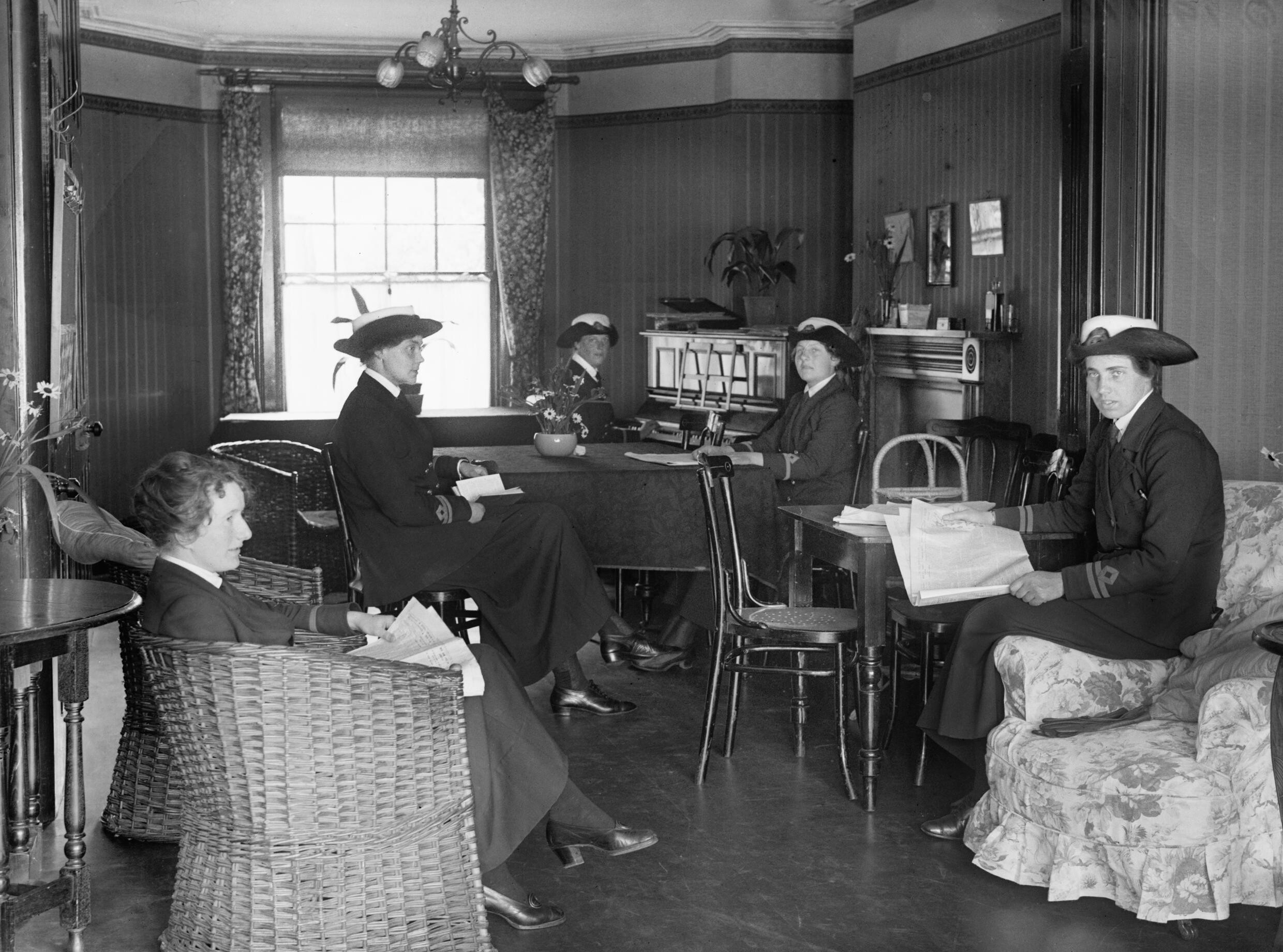
Officers of the Women's Royal Naval Service relaxing in their wardroom during World War I
