= Abhinav Shukla (producer) =

Indian film and TV show producer

Abhinav Shukla is an Indian film and TV show producer. He is the producer of the film Ekkees Toppon Ki Salaami that released recently. He is the founder and director of the production company Nautanki Films.

== Professional life ==
After starting his company he produced shows such as Baba Aiso Varr Dhoondo (aired on Imagine TV), Do Dil Ek Jaan (aired on Life Ok) and Madhubala - Ek Ishq Ek Junoon (aired on Colors TV) Nautanki News, Lete hai Khabar and Nadaniya. His production house also contributed in some episodes crime patrol. He then got into film production with the comic satire Ekkees Toppon Ki Salaami. The first look of the film was launched by Shah Rukh Khan

Abhinav also headed the strategy and management team at B.A.G Films & Media Ltd. He played a vital role in setting up the channels News 24 and E24.

He also serves as the director and promoter of well known Great Valley School, Greater Noida.

== Education ==
Abhinav holds an MBA from Maastricht School of Management, Netherlands in International Finance (Marketing & Strategy).
