= Gitikka Ganju Dhar =

Indian TV personality

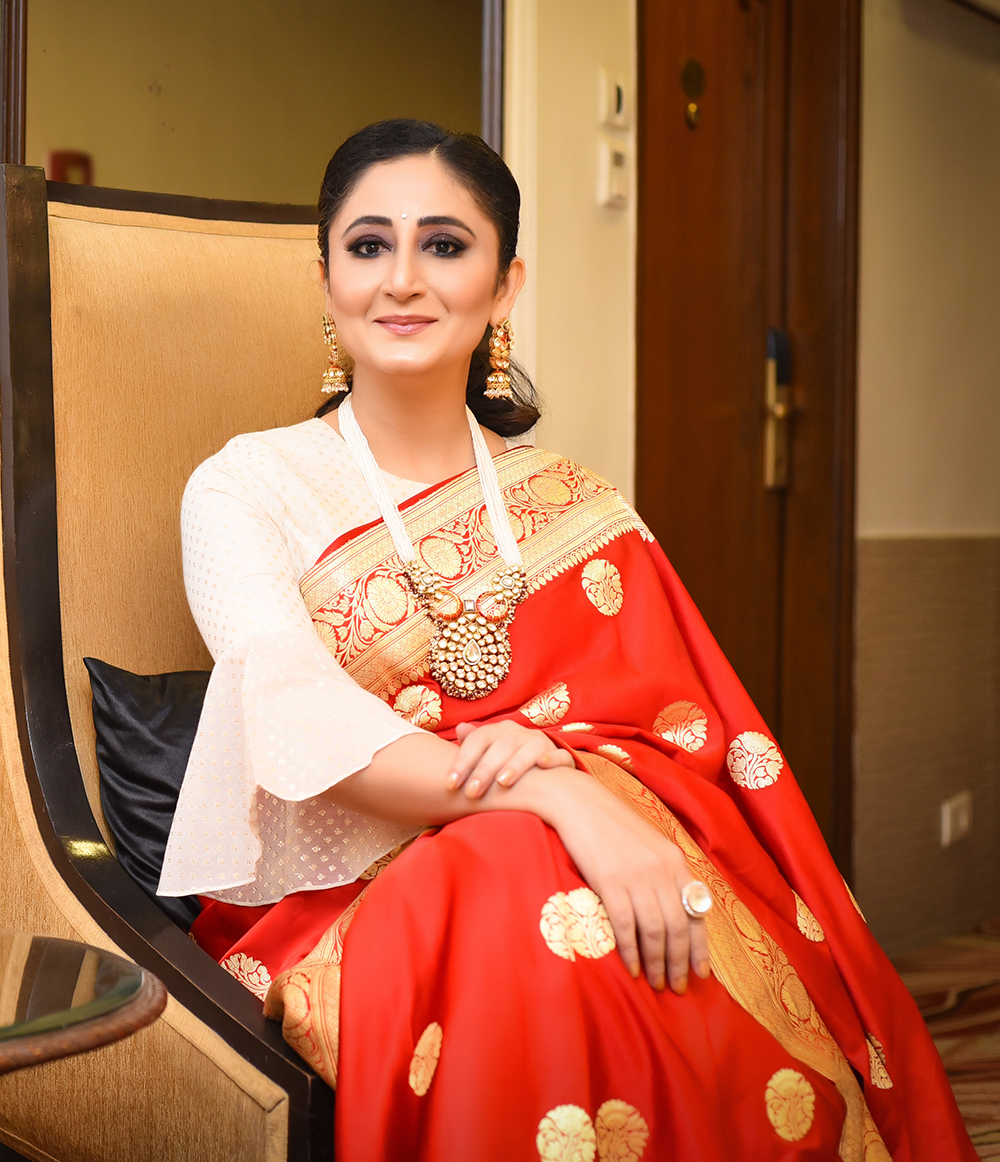
- Born: Geetika Ganju; New Delhi, India
- Education: AJK MCRC; Delhi University
- Occupations: Television personality, actress, television host
- Years active: 2000–present
- Spouse: Vineet Dhar (m.2009)
- Children: 1

Gitikka Ganju Dhar is an Indian TV personality, anchor and television host.

== Early life and education ==
Gitikka Ganju was born in New Delhi to Kashmiri Pandit parents. She received an undergraduate degree in business from Shaheed Sukhdev College of Business Studies, University of Delhi, and a postgraduate degree from the AJK Mass Communication Research Center. She is a formally trained Bharatanatyam dancer and Hindustani classical vocalist.

== Career ==
Gitikka began her career as an anchor in 2000. She has anchored for many television shows including Meri Saheli (Star Plus), Zaike ka Safar (Zee TV), Executive Class (DD National), Sehat Ki Rasoi (News 24, E24) and Chitrahaar (DD National). She also appeared in the Hindi film Music Meri Jaan (2016).

Gitikka has hosted more than 3,000 live events, which include anchoring many corporate, government, lifestyle, televised events and awards shows such as Main Bhi Chowkidaar, 20th Kargil Vijay Diwas, Fit India Launch, Pravasi Bharatiya Diwas, EEMAGINE, Make In India, IIFA Press Conference, Lakme Fashion Week, The Godfrey Phillips National Bravery Awards, The Overdrive Awards, ICWF, WOW Awards Asia, Swatch Bharat Abhiyan, 26/11 Stories of Strength Event Mumbai, The Great Indian Wedding Awards, Hotelier Awards, The Goafest, Magnetic Maharashtra Summit, INDO-ASEAN Summit and Global Solar Alliance.

She also has represented brands such as BMW, TATA Motors, WHO, UNICEF, Pepsi, Apple, ICICI Bank, State Bank of India, Google, Toyota, Honda, Samsung, OPPO, Indian Army, Jindal Steel, ONGC, IDC, Auto Desk, India Today, The Times of India, Hindustan Times and Colgate.

== Television ==
Serial	Role	Channel
Meri Saheli	Host	Star Plus
Bollywood Masala	Host	Doordarshan
Zaike Ka Safar	Host	Zee TV
Aap Ki Pasand	Host	DD Metro
Executive Class	Host	DD National
Sehat Ki Rasoi	Host	News 24, E24
Saturday Suspense	Host	Sony TV
Chitrahaar	Host	DD National

== Filmography ==
Key
†	Denotes films that have not yet been released

Year	Title	Role
2016	Music Meri Jaan	
2022	Laal Singh Chaddha	Manjeet Kaur
2025	Dhurandhar	Shabnam Jamali

== Personal life ==
Gitikka is married to Vineet Dhar, a banker and has a daughter named, Daeveka.

== Awards and recognition ==
- 2019 - Woman Leadership Award by ET Now at Stars of the Industry Awards 2019.
- 2019 - Live Quotient Award for Best Emcee Corporate and Lifestyle Events 2019.
- 2019 - Named Nation Builder by India Today, one among 100 Nation Builders, from across the spectrum of Indian Industries.
- 2019 - Best Contribution to the Live Experiential Domain by BW Applause at the BW Applause & Everythingexperiential.com Summit & Awards.
- 2018 - Best Anchor India Female Gold at the Spotlight Awards.
- 2018 - WOW Live Artist of the Decade 2018 by Eventfaqs.
- 2018 - Named among the Top 10 Most powerful women in the Indian live space in India in the book - The Decade of Transformation, presented by EEMA.
- 2017 - Best Anchor India Female Gold at the Spotlight Awards.
- 2017 - Best Emcee India Female by BW Applause at the BW Applause Awards.
- 2003 - Bharat Nirman Award for contribution to the field of anchoring in India.
- 2012 - Best Emcee India Female at the Live Quotient Awards.
