= List of accolades received by Forrest Gump =

Accolades received by Forrest Gump
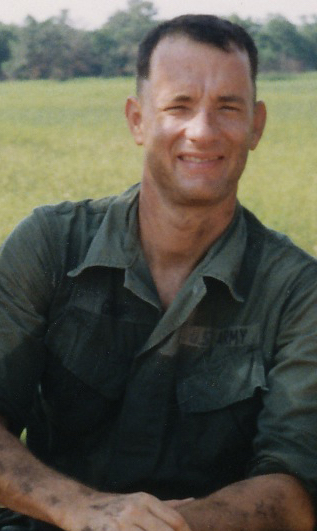
- Tom Hanks' performance as Forrest Gump was universally praised
Awards and Nominations
Award	Won	Nominated
Academy Awards	6	13
Saturn Awards	2	4
Amanda Award	0	0
American Cinema Editors	1	0
American Comedy Awards	1	0
American Society of Cinematographers	0	1
BAFTA Film Awards	1	7
Casting Society of America	0	1
Chicago Film Critics Association Awards	1	0
Directors Guild of America	1	0
Golden Globe Awards	3	4
Guldbagge Awards	0	1
MTV Movie Awards	0	3
Motion Picture Sound Editors (Golden Reel Award)	1	0
National Board of Review of Motion Pictures	3	0
PGA Golden Laurel Awards	1	0
People's Choice Awards	3	0
Screen Actors Guild Awards	1	3
Writers Guild of America Awards	1	0
Young Artist Awards	2	1
- Total number of wins and nominations
Totals	29	61
- Footnotes

Forrest Gump is a 1994 romantic comedy-drama film based on the 1986 novel of the same name by Winston Groom. With a screenplay by Eric Roth and starring popular actor Tom Hanks, the film premiered in Los Angeles, California on June 23, 1994. It was released in the United States and Canada on July 6, 1994, opening in 1,595 domestic theaters and earning $24,450,602 on its first weekend. Forrest Gump grossed $677 million and was at its time the fourth highest-grossing film of all time (behind only E.T. the Extra-Terrestrial, Star Wars IV: A New Hope, and Jurassic Park). Despite its praise, it has only a 75% approval rating on Rotten Tomatoes.

Forrest Gump won six Academy Awards for Best Picture, Best Actor in a Leading Role, Best Director, Best Visual Effects, Best Adapted Screenplay, and Best Film Editing. Hanks became the first actor since Spencer Tracy to win two consecutive Academy Awards for Best Actor; he won the previous year for Philadelphia.

The film garnered seven Golden Globe Award nominations, winning three of them, including Best Actor – Motion Picture Drama, Best Director – Motion Picture, and Best Motion Picture – Drama. The film was also nominated for six Saturn Awards and won two for Best Fantasy Film and Best Supporting Actor (Film). The film also won the Outstanding Achievement in Special Effects award at the 1995 BAFTA Film Awards.

Forrest Gump also won numerous other awards, such as Best Actor for Tom Hanks from the Screen Actors Guild Awards in its first year, from a total of four category nominations. The film received three nominations from the MTV Movie Awards, but left empty handed. The film swept the People's Choice Awards in its three nominations. The American Society of Cinematographers nominated the film's cinematographer Don Burgess for Outstanding Achievement in Cinematography in Theatrical Release, but he lost to Roger Deakins of Shawshank Redemption'

The film was selected for preservation by the Library of Congress in the United States National Film Registry in 2011, being deemed "culturally, historically, or aesthetically significant". The movie has made multiple American Film Institute lists, including one for quotations for its "Mama always said life was like a box of chocolates. You never know what you're gonna get.", ranking 40th on 100 Years...100 Movie Quotes. The film ranked 240 on Empire's list of the 500 Greatest Movies Of All Time. A chain of restaurants, Bubba Gump Shrimp Company, opened with a name drawn from the film.

== Awards and nominations ==
Award	Category	Recipients and nominees	Result
67th Academy Awards	Best Picture	Wendy Finerman, Steve Starkey, and Steve Tisch	Won
67th Academy Awards	Best Director	Robert Zemeckis	Won
67th Academy Awards	Best Actor	Tom Hanks	Won
67th Academy Awards	Best Supporting Actor	Gary Sinise	Nominated
67th Academy Awards	Best Screenplay Based on Material Previously Produced or Published (Adapted Screenplay)	Eric Roth	Won
67th Academy Awards	Best Art Direction	Rick Carter and Nancy Haigh	Nominated
67th Academy Awards	Best Cinematography	Don Burgess	Nominated
67th Academy Awards	Best Film Editing	Arthur Schmidt	Won
67th Academy Awards	Best Makeup	Daniel C. Striepeke, Judith A. Cory and Hallie D'Amore	Nominated
67th Academy Awards	Best Original Score	Alan Silvestri	Nominated
67th Academy Awards	Best Sound	Randy Thom, Tom Johnson, Dennis S. Sands, and William B. Kaplan	Nominated
67th Academy Awards	Best Sound Effects Editing	Randy Thom and Gloria S. Borders	Nominated
67th Academy Awards	Best Visual Effects	Ken Ralston, George Murphy, Allen Hall and Stephen Rosenbaum	Won
1995 Saturn Awards	Best Supporting Actor	Gary Sinise	Won
1995 Saturn Awards	Best Fantasy Film	Wendy Finerman, Steve Starkey, and Steve Tisch	Won
1995 Saturn Awards	Best Actor	Tom Hanks	Nominated
1995 Saturn Awards	Best Music	Alan Silvestri	Nominated
1995 Saturn Awards	Best Special Effects	Ken Ralston	Nominated
1995 Saturn Awards	Best Writing	Eric Roth	Nominated
1995 Amanda Awards	Best Film - International		Won
1995 American Cinema Editors	Best Edited Feature Film	Arthur Schmidt	Won
1995 American Comedy Awards	Funniest Actor in a Motion Picture - Leading Role	Tom Hanks	Won
1995 American Society of Cinematographers	Outstanding Achievement in Cinematography in Theatrical Releases	Don Burgess	Nominated
1995 BAFTA Film Awards	Outstanding Achievement in Special Effects	Ken Ralston, George Murphy, Stephen Rosenbaum, Doug Chiang, and Allen Hall	Won
1995 BAFTA Film Awards	Best Actor in a Leading Role	Tom Hanks	Nominated
1995 BAFTA Film Awards	Best Actress in a Supporting Role	Sally Field	Nominated
1995 BAFTA Film Awards	Best Film	Wendy Finerman, Steve Tisch, Steve Starkey, and Robert Zemeckis	Nominated
1995 BAFTA Film Awards	Best Cinematography	Don Burgess	Nominated
1995 BAFTA Film Awards	David Lean Award for Direction	Robert Zemeckis	Nominated
1995 BAFTA Film Awards	Best Editing	Arthur Schmidt	Nominated
1995 BAFTA Film Awards	Best Adapted Screenplay	Eric Roth	Nominated
1995 Casting Society of America	Best Casting for Feature Film - Drama	Ellen Lewis	Nominated
1995 Chicago Film Critics Association Awards	Best Actor	Tom Hanks	Won
1995 Directors Guild of America	Outstanding Directorial Achievement in Motion Pictures	Robert Zemeckis, Charles Newirth, Bruce Moriarity, Cherylanne Martin, and Dana J. Kuznetzkoff	Won
1995 Golden Globe Awards	Best Actor – Motion Picture Drama	Tom Hanks	Won
1995 Golden Globe Awards	Best Director	Robert Zemeckis	Won
1995 Golden Globe Awards	Best Motion Picture - Drama	Wendy Finerman	Won
1995 Golden Globe Awards	Best Supporting Actor – Motion Picture	Gary Sinise	Nominated
1995 Golden Globe Awards	Best Supporting Actress – Motion Picture	Robin Wright	Nominated
1995 Golden Globe Awards	Best Original Score	Alan Silvestri	Nominated
1995 Golden Globe Awards	Best Screenplay	Eric Roth	Nominated
30th Guldbagge Awards	Best Foreign Film		Nominated
1995 MTV Movie Awards	Best Breakthrough Performance	Mykelti Williamson	Nominated
1995 MTV Movie Awards	Best Male Performance	Tom Hanks	Nominated
1995 MTV Movie Awards	Best Movie		Nominated
1995 Motion Picture Sound Editors - Golden Reel Award	Best Sound Editing		Won
1994 National Board of Review of Motion Pictures	Best Actor	Tom Hanks	Won
1994 National Board of Review of Motion Pictures	Best Supporting Actor	Gary Sinise	Won
1994 National Board of Review of Motion Pictures	Best Picture		Won
1995 PGA Golden Laurel Awards	Motion Picture Producer of the Year Award	Wendy Finerman, Steve Tisch, Steve Starkey, and Charles Newirth	Won
1995 People's Choice Awards	Favorite All-Around Motion Picture		Won
1995 People's Choice Awards	Favorite Dramatic Motion Picture		Won
1995 People's Choice Awards	Favorite Actor in a Dramatic Motion Picture	Tom Hanks	Won
1995 Screen Actors Guild Awards	Outstanding Performance by a Male Actor in a Leading Role	Tom Hanks	Won
1995 Screen Actors Guild Awards	Outstanding Performance by a Male Actor in a Supporting Role	Gary Sinise	Nominated
1995 Screen Actors Guild Awards	Outstanding Performance by a Female Actor in a Supporting Role	Sally Field	Nominated
1995 Screen Actors Guild Awards	Outstanding Performance by a Female Actor in a Supporting Role	Robin Wright	Nominated
1995 Writers Guild of America Awards	Best Screenplay Adapted from Another Medium	Eric Roth	Won
1995 Young Artist Awards	Best Performance in a Feature Film – Young Actor 10 or Younger	Haley Joel Osment	Won
1995 Young Artist Awards	Best Performance in a Feature Film – Young Actress 10 or Younger	Hanna R. Hall	Won
1995 Young Artist Awards	Best Performance in a Feature Film – Young Actor Co-Starring	Michael Conner Humphreys	Nominated

== Year-end lists ==
- 1st – National Board of Review
- 1st – Douglas Armstrong, The Milwaukee Journal
- 1st – Todd Anthony, Miami New Times
- 1st – Sandi Davis, The Oklahoman
- 1st – Christopher Sheid, The Munster Times
- 2nd – Michael MacCambridge, Austin American-Statesman
- 2nd – Bob Strauss, Los Angeles Daily News
- 2nd – Glenn Lovell, San Jose Mercury News
- 2nd – Joan Vadeboncoeur, Syracuse Herald American
- 3rd – Scott Schuldt, The Oklahoman
- 3rd – Steve Persall, St. Petersburg Times
- 5th – Mack Bates, The Milwaukee Journal
- 6th – Gene Siskel, The Chicago Tribune
- 6th – James Berardinelli, ReelViews
- 6th – Robert Denerstein, Rocky Mountain News
- 9th – Stephen Hunter, The Baltimore Sun
- 10th – John Hurley, Staten Island Advance
- 10th – Sean P. Means, The Salt Lake Tribune
- 10th – Dan Craft, The Pantagraph
- Top 10 (listed alphabetically, not ranked) – Mike Mayo, The Roanoke Times
- Top 10 (listed alphabetically, not ranked) – William Arnold, Seattle Post-Intelligencer
- Top 10 (listed alphabetically, not ranked) – Bob Ross, The Tampa Tribune
- Top 10 (listed alphabetically, not ranked) – Steve Murray, The Atlanta Journal-Constitution
- Top 10 (listed alphabetically, not ranked) – Jeff Simon, The Buffalo News
- Top 10 (not ranked) – Dennis King, Tulsa World
- Top 10 (not ranked) – George Meyer, The Ledger
- Top 10 (not ranked) – Bob Carlton, The Birmingham News
- Best of the year (not ranked), Jeffrey Lyons and Michael Medved, Sneak Previews
- Honorable mentions – Mike Clark, USA Today
- 10th worst – Janet Maslin, The New York Times
- Most overrated movie – David Stupich, The Milwaukee Journal
