= UMS-Wright Preparatory School =

Prep school in Mobile, Alabama, US

UMS Wright Preparatory School

Location
- 65 Mobile St; Mobile, Alabama 36607; United States

Information
- Former name: University Military School
- School type: Private College Preparatory
- Motto: "For the UMS-Wright Family to educate all students to their highest potential in mind, body, and spirit, "and to produce in each student character of the highest possible order."
- Established: 1893
- Founder: Dr. Julius T Wright
- Principal: Jeb Blackerby (Upper School), Bre Stricklin (Middle School), Aldridge Marks (Lower School)
- Head of school: Dr. Doug Barber
- Head teacher: Dr. Doug G. Barber
- Faculty: 144
- Grades: K-3 – Twelfth Grade
- Gender: Co-educational
- Enrollment: 1,150
- Student to teacher ratio: 8:1
- Language: English
- Hours in school day: 8
- Campus size: 32 acres
- Colors: Crimson and Grey
- Song: UMS-Wright Alma Mater
- Athletics conference: Alabama 5A
- Sports: Yes
- Mascot: Bulldog
- Team name: UMS-Wright Bulldogs
- Rival: St. Paul's Episcopal School
- Accreditation: Southern Association of Colleges and Schools
- Test average: ACT: 30 SAT: 1360
- Publication: The Mind's Eye
- Newspaper: The Crimson and Grey
- Yearbook: The Cadet
- Annual tuition: K3: $6,645; K4 and K5: $7,745; Grades 1–2: $10,105; Grades 3–4: $10,875; Grades 5–6: $11,245; Grades 7–8: $12,255; Grades 9–12: $12,745
- Website: https://www.ums-wright.org/

UMS-Wright is an independent co-educational prep school in Mobile, Alabama. The school was founded in 1893 as University Military School, and in 1988 it combined with Julius T Wright School for Girls (founded 1956) to form UMS-Wright Preparatory School.

== History ==
=== University Military School ===
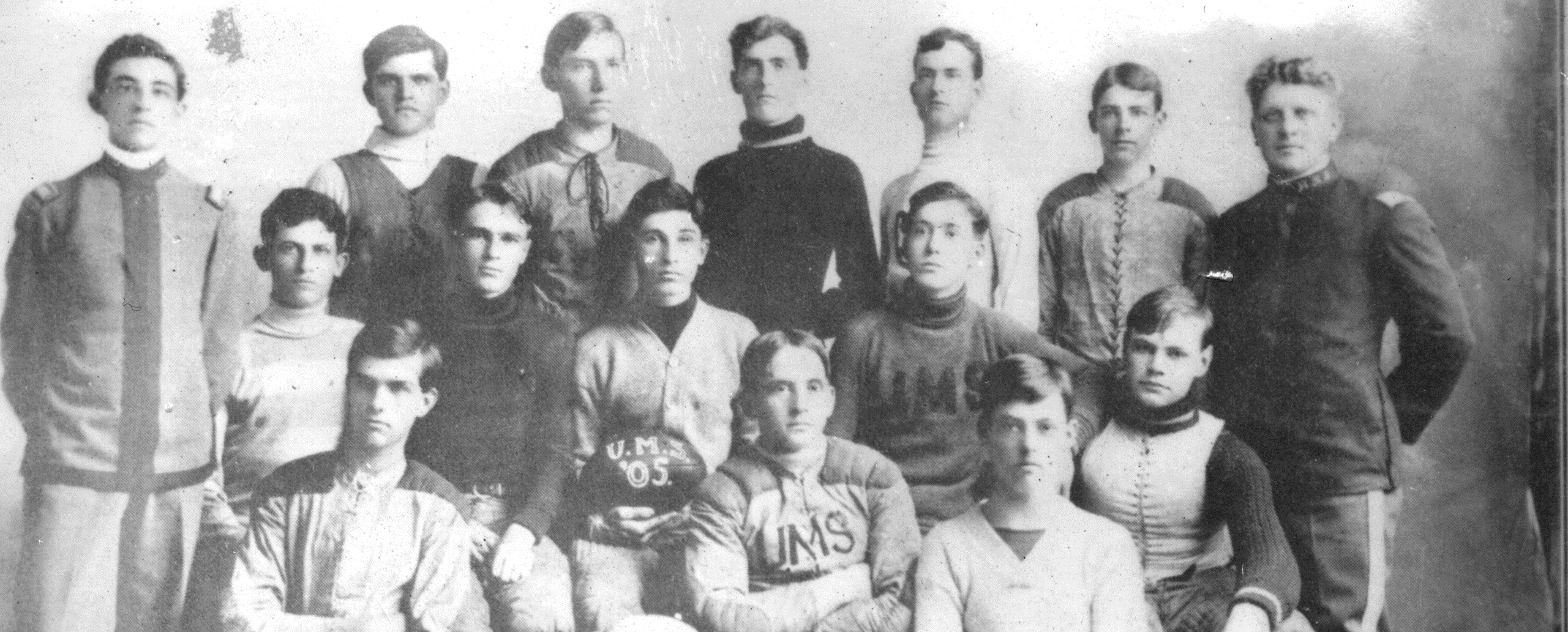
1905 UMS Football Team

UMS-Wright Preparatory opened as University Military School on October 2, 1893, at 559 Conti Street. The school's founder and first headmaster was Dr. Julius T. Wright (1871–1931). The school's opening day coincided with the 1893 Cheniere Caminada hurricane. The school had a single teacher and twenty-five pupils at a tuition of $8 a month. Dr. Wright served as the headmaster of the school until his death in 1931. William Pape took over after Dr. Wright. Pape died in 1943 and his family turned control of the school over to a nonprofit corporation, the UMS Alumni and Parents Association, Inc. UMS moved the school to its current location on North Mobile Street in 1956 to accommodate the growing number of students.

=== Girls Preparatory School ===
Thirty years after the opening of University Military School (an all male school) Julius T Wright opened Girls Preparatory School in 1923 to provide a similar education to the young women of the Mobile community. It only lasted eight years as it closed after the death of Dr. Wright in 1931.

=== Julius T. Wright School for Girls ===
Julius T. Wright School for Girls opened in 1956 at the same location as Girls Preparatory School at 1315 Dauphin Street, which had been newly renovated. It came after a long campaign by alumni of the original Girls Preparatory School to have a female equivalent to University Military School. The school moved to 1400 S University Blvd in 1972. It remained there until its merger with University Military School in 1988.

=== UMS-Wright Preparatory School ===
In 1988, University Military School and Julius T Wright School for Girls followed the trend of many other single-gender schools around the country and combined to form the co-educational UMS-Wright Preparatory School. Dr. Tony Havard, a member of the UMS English faculty, was named the headmaster and is now the current president of the school.

== Description ==
=== Structure ===
The school has a three-level structure: the Lower School (K-3 through 4th grade), the Middle school (5th grade through 8th grade), and the Upper School (9th grade through 12th grade).

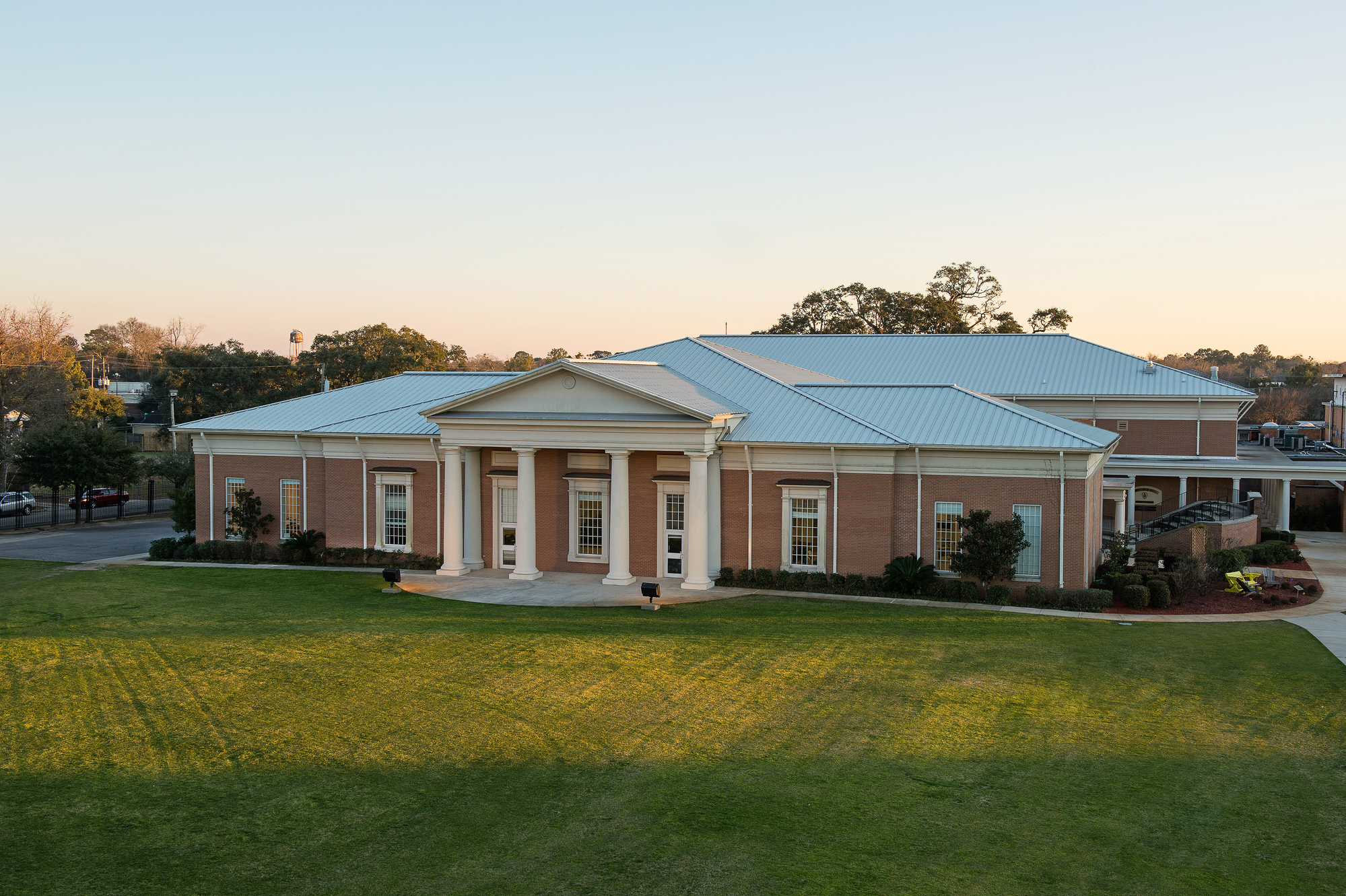
The UMS-Wright Arts Building that is used for Fine Art, Drama, Chorus, and Band Classes.

=== Campus ===
Located on Campus are five Lower School buildings, two middle school buildings, and one high school building. All three have separate offices and principals. The campus also houses two full-size gymnasiums, a weight training facility, and an athletic training facility. The football stadium, Cooper Stadium, is surrounded by a four-hundred meter track. Also located on Campus are two multi-purpose fields, a twenty-five-meter swimming pool, a baseball field, and a softball field.

=== Graduation ===
The attire for the graduation ceremony is gender specific for graduating seniors. Female students are required to wear white dresses and carry bouquets. Male students wear the traditional black caps and gowns.

== Athletics ==
UMS-Wright offers thirteen team sports for students from lower school to high school. The school competes in the AHSAA division 4A. The Sports offered include cross country, football, soccer, tennis, swimming and diving, track and field, softball, baseball, bass fishing, and bowling.

UMS-Wright also has a long-standing athletic rivalry with St. Paul's Episcopal School, another local private high school that is just 2.2 miles away down Old Shell Road. In football and track and field, the two teams meet every year in the "Battle of Old Shell Road."

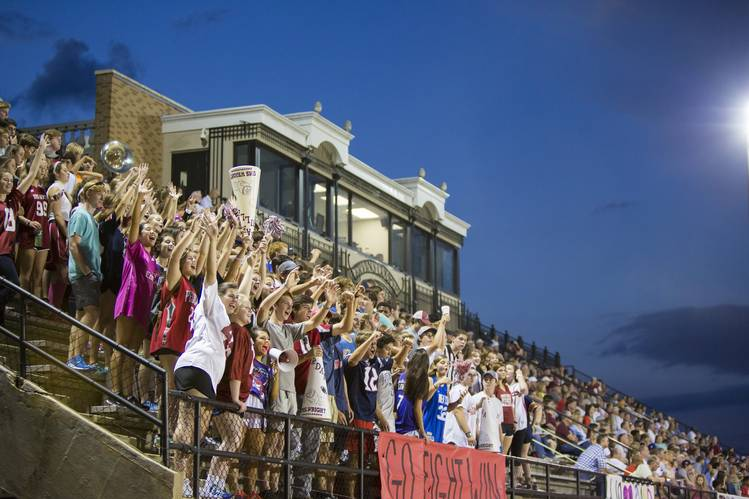
The Student Section of a Home UMS-Wright Football Game.

=== State titles ===
UMS-Wright has 156 total state championship titles:

- Baseball ~ 1978 • 1988 • 1993 • 1995 • 1997 • 1999 • 2010 • 2011 • 2016 • 2017
- Boys Basketball ~ 1998
- Girls Basketball ~ 1978
- Boys Cross Country ~ 1971 • 1975 • 1980 • 1997 • 2008 • 2009 • 2010 • 2011
- Girls Cross Country ~ 1977 • 1980 • 1981 • 1982 • 1983 • 2004 • 2005 • 2009 • 2010 • 2011 • 2012 • 2013
- Football ~ 1987 • 2001 • 2002 • 2005 • 2008 • 2012 • 2017 • 2018 • 2019
- Boys Soccer ~ 2010 • 2011
- Swimming and Diving ~ 1997 • 2018
- Boys Tennis 1968 • 1981 • 1989 • 1990 • 2001 • 2002 • 2003 • 2004 • 2006 • 2009 • 2010 • 2011 • 2012 • 2013 • 2014 • 2015 • 2016
- Girls Tennis 1978 • 1994 • 2004 • 2005 • 2006 • 2009 • 2010 • 2011 • 2012 • 2013 • 2014 • 2015 • 2016 • 2017 • 2018
- Boys Outdoor Track ~ 1981 • 1982 • 1983 • 1990 • 1991 • 1997 • 1988 • 1999 • 2000 • 2002 • 2003 • 2004 • 2005 • 2006 • 2009 • 2010 • 2011 • 2012 • 2013 • 2014 • 2015 • 2016
- Girls Outdoor Track ~ 1982 • 1983 • 2000 • 2001 • 2002 • 2003 • 2004 • 2005 • 2006 • 2009 • 2010 • 2011 • 2012 • 2013 • 2015 • 2016 • 2018
- Boys Indoor Track ~ 1972 • 1981 • 1982 • 1983 • 1985 • 1997 • 1998 • 1999 • 2000 • 2006 • 2012 • 2013 • 2014 • 2015
- Girls Indoor Track ~ 1981 • 1982 • 1984 • 1997 • 2001 • 2012 • 2013
- Junior High Indoor Track ~ 1968
- Boys Golf ~ 1961 • 1971 • 1980 • 1983 • 1990 • 1992 • 1993 • 1994 • 1995 • 1996 • 1997 • 1998 • 1999 • 2000 • 2001 • 2002 • 2003 • 2008 • 2009 • 2010 • 2011 • 2014 • 2016 • 2017

== Academics ==
UMS Wright was ranked second out of ninety-seven schools in Niche.com "Best Private K-12 Schools in Alabama" ranking. The average ACT score is 30 and the average SAT score in 1360. 99% of graduating seniors attend a four-year college or university, with the 3 most popular being the University of Alabama, Auburn University, and the University of South Alabama. The school currently has 1,150 students enrolled with a student-teacher ratio of 8:1.

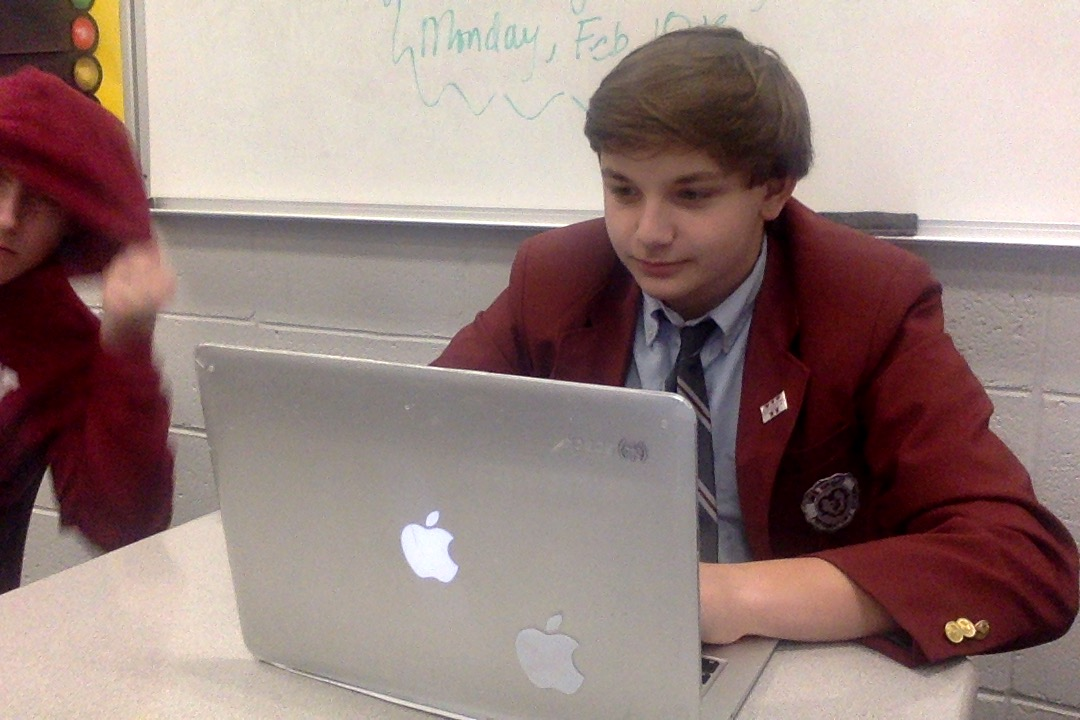
All UMS-Wright Students Are Given Apple Macbook Air Laptops to complete their coursework; as part of the Pettie grant.

=== Clubs ===
- Art Guild
- Azalea Trail
- French Club
- Spanish Circle
- Theatre Guild
- Wright Singers
- Youth Judicial
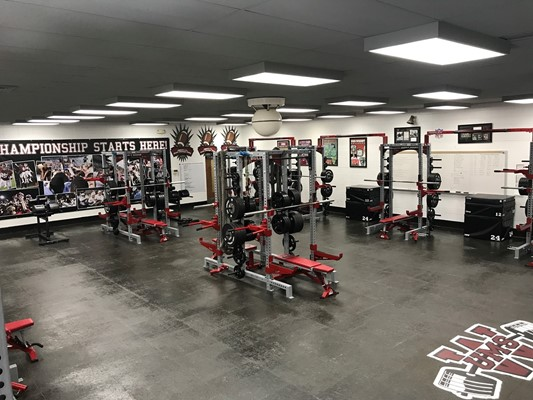
  The UMS-Wright Marvin Mostellar Sr. Weight Room, also called "Pettie's Palace," which is used for boys and girls Physical Education Classes

=== Honor Societies ===
- Cum Laude Society
- National Honor Society
- Quill & Scroll
- Mu Alpha Theta
- Science National Honor Society
- Spanish/French Honor Society
- National English Honor Society
- Rho Kappa Honor Society

=== Honor Council ===
The Honor Council is composed of student representatives in grades 9–12 who are elected to promote honesty and integrity.

== Notable alumni ==
- Miller Reese Hutchison (around 1895; there are very few records of the early UMS graduates); inventor of the vehicle horn and hearing aid
- Winston Groom (1961), Author of Forrest Gump
- Bradley Byrne (1973), former U.S. Representative.
- Sandy Stimpson (1970), Mayor of Mobile, Alabama
- Jay Prosch (2009), Professional American football player
- Bobby Wyatt (2010), Professional golfer
- Tanner Allen (2017), MLB outfielder
- Paige Madden (2017), Olympic Swimmer
- Maddux Bruns (2021), Pitcher in the Los Angeles Dodgers organization
