= Laal Singh Chaddha =

2022 Indian film by Advait Chandan

- Theatrical release poster
- Directed by: Advait Chandan
- Screenplay by: Atul Kulkarni
- Based on: Forrest Gump by Winston Groom
- Produced by: Aamir Khan; Kiran Rao; Jyoti Deshpande; Ajit Andhare
- Starring: Aamir Khan; Kareena Kapoor Khan; Naga Chaitanya; Mona Singh; Manav Vij
- Cinematography: Satyajit Pande (Setu)
- Edited by: Hemanti Sarkar
- Music by: Score: Tanuj Tiku; Songs: Pritam
- Production companies: Paramount Pictures; Viacom18 Studios; Aamir Khan Productions
- Distributed by: see below
- Release date: 11 August 2022
- Running time: 159 minutes
- Country: India
- Language: Hindi
- Budget: ₹275 crore
- Box office: est. ₹132.03 crore

Laal Singh Chaddha is a 2022 Indian Hindi-language comedy-drama film directed by Advait Chandan and written by Atul Kulkarni. The film is jointly produced by Paramount Pictures, Aamir Khan Productions and Viacom18 Studios. It is a remake of the 1994 American film Forrest Gump, which itself is an adaptation of the novel of the same name by Winston Groom. The film stars Aamir Khan as the title character alongside Kareena Kapoor Khan, Naga Chaitanya and Mona Singh. This film marked the final film appearance of the actress, Kamini Kaushal, who died in 2025.

The adaptation of Forrest Gump underwent a series of changes over a period of two decades, with Kulkarni spending the first ten years adapting the script, and another ten years purchasing the remake rights. Aamir Khan bought the rights to the film in early 2018 with the help of Los Angeles-based producer and director Radhika Chaudhari and announced the film officially on 14 March 2019, with its title. The film's score is composed by Tanuj Tiku, while its original soundtrack is composed by Pritam with their lyrics written by Amitabh Bhattacharya.

Laal Singh Chaddha has been filmed in more than 100 Indian locations. Principal photography began in October 2019 and concluded in September 2021, after multiple delays due to the COVID-19 pandemic. The film was initially scheduled for cinema release on multiple dates in 2020–2022, but kept getting delayed due to the production halt caused by the pandemic. It was theatrically released worldwide on 11 August 2022, coinciding with Raksha Bandhan and Indian Independence Day. It opened to mixed reviews from critics and audiences, with praise for its adaptation to the new setting, faithfulness to the source material, depth, soundtrack, background score and emotion, but received criticism for Khan's performance, pacing and failure to conceive some sequences. Against its budget of ₹2.75 billion, the film generated a theatrical revenue of ₹1.32 billion worldwide, thus proving to be a box office bomb.

== Plot ==
Laal Singh Chaddha follows the life journey of Laal Singh Chaddha a kind-hearted Sikh man with a low IQ who recounts his extraordinary life during a train journey through Punjab. The story is set against significant historical events in India, weaving Laal's personal experiences with broader cultural and social themes. Laal is born in a village near Pathankot with physical challenges that affect his legs. Despite his difficulties, his supportive mother, Gurpreet Kaur Chaddha, instills in him the belief that he can achieve anything he desires. She works as a maid to secure Laal's admission to a local missionary school, where he befriends Rupa D'Souza, his only friend. Rupa dreams of a glamorous life and becomes a crucial part of Laal's world. As a child, Laal experiences various pivotal moments, including watching India's 1983 Cricket World Cup victory on television and witnessing Operation Blue Star during a visit to his aunt in Amritsar. He also unknowingly influences a young Shah Rukh Khan with his dance steps that the latter later incorporates into his acting career.

Laal's journey continues as he faces bullying at school, leading him to discover his extraordinary talent for running after a group of bullies break his leg braces. His athletic abilities earn him a place at Hindu College in Delhi. Rupa, meanwhile, begins to pursue modeling, further complicating their relationship. During his college years, Laal participates in significant political events, including the Mandal Commission protests and the Babri Masjid riots. After completing his education, he joins the Indian Army, following a family tradition of military service.

In the Army, Laal befriends Bala Raju Bodi, who shares his aspirations of starting an undergarment factory after their service. During the Kargil War in 1999, Laal displays remarkable bravery, saving multiple soldiers, including a Pakistani commander, without realizing his identity. His heroism earns him the Vir Chakra, but the loss of Bala during the conflict deeply affects him. After leaving the Army, Laal starts an underwear business named "Bala" in memory of his friend and his unspoken love for Rupa. However, he struggles with marketing his products. With the help of Mohammed Baaji, the Pakistani commander he saved, they rename the brand as "Rupa" and achieve significant success.

Rupa reenters Laal's life, but her dreams have taken a different path. She becomes involved with a gangster, leading to a tumultuous relationship. Despite their deep bond, Rupa ultimately chooses wealth over love, further complicating Laal's feelings. After Rupa is imprisoned for six months due to her connections with the gangster, Laal embarks on a cross-country run to escape his emotional turmoil. His journey captures national attention, and people join him, believing he is running for a greater purpose. However, Laal's simple explanation for stopping after years of running is merely that he is tired and wants to go home.

Upon returning home, Laal learns that Rupa has written to him frequently and that she has a son named Aman, who is also Laal's child. Despite Rupa's terminal illness, Laal decides to marry her and provide a loving home for their son. The film culminates in Laal embracing fatherhood, enrolling Aman in the same school he attended, symbolizing the completion of his journey and the continuation of his legacy.

== Cast ==
- Aamir Khan in a four roles as
  - Naik Laal Singh Chaddha (Parachute Regiment), Rupa's husband and widower, Aman's father, Gurpreet's son
    - Ahmad Ibn Umar as young Laal
  - Laal Singh Chaddha #3, Laal's maternal grandfather & Gurpreet's father
  - Laal Singh Chaddha #2, Laal's maternal great grandfather & Gurpreet's grandfather
  - Laal Singh Chaddha #1, Laal's maternal great great grandfather & Gurpreet's great grandfather
- Kareena Kapoor Khan as Rupa D'Souza Chaddha, Laal's love interest later wife, Aman's mother
  - Hafsa Ashraf as young Rupa
- Naga Chaitanya in a four roles as
  - Naik Balaraju "Bala" Bodi, Laal's colleague in the Indian Army and his good friend
  - Ramaraju Bodi
  - Devaraju Bodi
  - Varadaraju Bodi
- Mona Singh as Gurpreet Kaur Chaddha, Laal's mother, Aman's grandmother
- Rohaan Singh as Aman Chaddha, Laal and Rupa's son, Gurpreet's grandson
- Manav Vij as Muhammad Yakoob aka Muhammad Paji, a Pakistan Army Havildar who later befriends Laal
- Aaryaa Sharma as the woman passenger sitting across of Laal in the train
- Arun Bali as an old Sikh man on the train
- Kamini Kaushal as an old Sikh woman on the train (cameo appearance)
- Jagat Rawat as Father, principal of the school Laal studies in
- Yuri Suri as Colonel Suri, commanding officer, General Hospital, Leh
- Dhananjay Singh as Ramon Chibb, Laal's instructor in the Parachute Regiment training Centre
- Gitikka Ganju Dhar as Manjeet Kaur, Laal's Aunt
- Harry Parmar as Abbas Haji, Rupa's boyfriend
- Guneet Singh Sodhi as Harry, Rupa's boyfriend
- Shiv Pandit as Captain Sandeep, Laal's Platoon Commander
- Syed Ashraf Karim as Chota Shakeel
- Krishna Kant Singh Bundela as neighbour
- Shah Rukh Khan as himself (cameo appearance)

== Production ==
=== Development ===
In August 2018, Aamir Khan announced that he had purchased the remake rights of the 1994 American drama Forrest Gump, from Paramount Pictures, which produced the film, and also suggested he will play the lead role in this film. On 14 March 2019, coinciding with his 54th birthday, Khan officially announced the project which has been named Laal Singh Chaddha, with his ex-wife Kiran Rao co-producing the film. Advait Chandan, who previously directed Khan's Secret Superstar (2017), was signed in to direct the remake.

Kulkarni, who also worked with Khan in Rang De Basanti (2006), wrote the Hindi adaptation for the original. In an interview with Bollywood Hungama, Kulkarni said, "I wrote the script ten years ago, but Aamir took a couple of years because he did not believe that I must have written a good script. So he did not want to hurt me. After a few years, he heard the script and within 30 seconds he said I am going to do the film." Kulkarni also said that it took over seven years to get the remake rights from the makers of the original (Paramount), as the movie is solely based on the original. Once the studio confirmed with Radhika Chaudhari that the rights were available, Khan made a trip to Los Angeles in February 2018 and met with the studio heads along with Radhika Chaudhari and the process of acquisition started.

=== Casting ===
Mukesh Chhabra was assigned as the casting director of the film. Aamir Khan playing the title character, Kareena Kapoor Khan was confirmed to play the female lead role in June 2019, thus pairing up with Khan for the third time after 3 Idiots (2009) and Talaash: The Answer Lies Within (2012). Manushi Chhillar was first choice for leading lady but, already signed a contract with Yash Raj Films. In August 2019, Vijay Sethupathi was signed alongside Khan, however he later opted out due to other commitments. In September 2019, Yogi Babu was approached to play a pivotal role. In November 2019, Mona Singh who also starred in Khan's 3 Idiots, was also cast in the pivotal role. Aamir Khan lost 20 kilograms for the younger version of his role in the film. Malayalam actor Tovino Thomas was considered for a role in the film, but declined due to commitments with his film Minnal Murali. In May 2021, Naga Chaitanya was confirmed to be a part of the cast, marking his Hindi debut.

=== Filming ===
While the film's principal photography was expected to commence in October 2019, Khan and his team went on scouting location in April 2019, across Dharmasala for five days.

Laal Singh Chaddha is reportedly filmed in more than 100 Indian locations. The principal photography of the film was commenced on 31 October 2019, with a muhurat shot given by Khan's mother Zeenat Hussain. The first schedule took place at Chandigarh, on 1 November and was completed within 21 days. Stills featuring Khan and Kapoor from the sets were leaked onto the internet, with Khan's look featuring him with a thick beard and turban went viral. A romantic track featuring Aamir Khan and Kareena Kapoor Khan was shot at Chandigarh on 28 November 2019.

The second schedule was kickstarted in Kolkata on 5 December 2019. Aamir Khan and his team flew to Kerala in the second week of December, where Khan's photos of shooting from Thekkumbhagam, Changanassery and Kappil went viral. Khan completed the second schedule on 19 December 2019, and kickstarted the third schedule on 21 December 2019, with shooting took place in Jaisalmer, Goa and Himachal Pradesh. The third schedule was completed on 12 February 2020, and Khan headed to Chandigarh for their next schedule. The team wrapped up the last leg of shoot on 6 March 2020. The cast and crew flew back to shoot in Punjab on 16 March 2020, before production of the film got halted owing to the COVID-19 pandemic in India.

Aamir Khan cancelled the Ladakh schedule on 6 July, owing to the India-China standoff along the Galwan Valley. Later due to difficulties in shooting the film across India, Aamir decided to resume the film's shoot in Turkey, for the recce of new shoot. On 7 September 2020, Aamir Khan resumed the shooting of the film in Mumbai, with safety measures and guidelines instructed by the government. On 27 September 2020, Aamir and his team flew to Delhi to shoot some portions, with pictures featuring his younger version went viral. Some scenes were shot at the Hotel Centaur in Delhi on 7 October 2020. Kareena Kapoor Khan wrapped up her portions on 15 October 2020.

Khan suffered a rib injury while shooting an action sequence, but ensuring that there is no delay in the shoot, the actor took a few pain killers and tried to subside his injury for the time being and continued working as he knew that there were special arrangements made for the shooting schedule. Earlier, while shooting for an important running sequence, Aamir Khan had suffered extreme physical exertion due to constant running. The actor shot few sequences at a sports complex located at Noida on 28 October 2020.

In July 2021, Aamir Khan and his team flew to Ladakh, where they spent some one month and shot war sequences. After wrapping up the Ladakh schedule the team reached to Srinagar in the first week of August. In Srinagar, the shooting of the film was carried out at various places, some important sequences were shot at Delhi Public School Srinagar (DPS), Amar Singh College and Boulevard Road near Dal Lake. During shooting in the premises of DPS, a 12-year-old, visually impaired student Zainab Bilal aka RJ Zainab has interviewed Aamir Khan for the school's in-house radio station, Radio DPS. Chaitanya joined the production in July 2021 and completed shooting his portions by August 2021.

Aamir Khan, Kareena Kapoor Khan and Prakash Vaghasiya were seen resuming the shoot of the film in Mumbai on 13 September. After wrapping up portions together last year, the two of them reunited for patchwork shoot in Andheri. The film was wrapped up on 16 September 2021.

== Music ==
The film score is composed by Tanuj Tiku while the original songs featured in the film are composed by Pritam, in his third collaboration with Aamir Khan after Dhoom 3 (2013) and Dangal (2016), with lyrics for the songs written by Amitabh Bhattacharya.

The first song of the film Kahani was released on 28 April 2022. Sonu Nigam's song, Main Ki Karaan, was released on 12 May 2022. A song sung by Arijit Singh, Phir Na Aisi Raat Aayegi, released on 24 June 2022. The fourth song Tur Kalleyan took more than 6 weeks of shoot and was shot at multiple locations across India. The song was released on 15 July 2022. A second version of Kahani, sung by Sonu Nigam was released on 18 July 2022. Tere Hawaale, a duet sung by Arijit Singh and Shilpa Rao, was released on 4 August 2022. The album was released through T-Series on 5 August 2022. An extended edition album featuring 5 additional tracks was released on 12 April 2023.

== Marketing ==
The trailer for the film was launched at the final of the 2022 Indian Premier League on 29 May.

== Release ==
=== Theatrical ===
Laal Singh Chaddha released on 11 August 2022 alongside dubbed versions in Tamil and Telugu languages. Earlier, it was announced to release on 25 December 2020, coinciding with Christmas. However, due to production halt owing to COVID-19 pandemic in India, the release was delayed by a year to 24 December 2021, aiming for the Christmas weekend. It was later rescheduled to release on 11 February and then 14 April 2022, however, it was postponed. The Motion Picture Association gave the film a PG-13 rating for "some violent content, thematic elements and suggestive material."

=== Distribution ===
The film was distributed in India by Viacom18 Studios, while international distribution of the film was taken through Paramount Pictures. The Telugu rights for Andhra Pradesh and Telangana region of the film were acquired by Geetha Arts. The Tamil Nadu theatrical rights are acquired by Red Giant Movies.

=== Home media ===
The digital distribution rights were acquired initially by Netflix at a cost of ₹150 crore. However, after the catastrophic performance of the film, Netflix cancelled the deal and finally offered a deal of ₹ 50 crore. The film was digitally streamed on Netflix from 6 October 2022 in Hindi and dubbed versions of Tamil and Telugu languages. Upon release, the film ranked in the top 10 in 13 countries in its first week on Netflix, the film finished second on the global non-English movies chart, with over 6.6 million hours viewed.

== Reception ==
=== Box office ===
Released on 3050 screens in India, Laal Singh Chaddha earned ₹11.58 crores at the domestic box office on its opening day. By the end of its run, the film only managed to gross ₹71.10 crore (US$7.4 million) in home market and ₹60.93 crore (US$6.3 million) overseas, for a worldwide gross collection of ₹132.03 crore (US$14 million) and was given the verdict "disaster" by Box Office India.

According to an estimate by The Indian Express, the losses owing to the film's underperformance amounted to ₹100 crore (US$10 million).

=== Critical response ===
On the review aggregator website Rotten Tomatoes, 69% of 36 critics' reviews are positive, with an average rating of 6.7/10. The website's consensus reads: "It's indebted to its source material to the point of creative poverty, but Laal Singh Chaddha is also such an amiable retelling that it's difficult to dislike." Metacritic, which uses a weighted average, assigned the film a score of 46 out of 100, based on 8 critics, indicating "mixed or average" reviews.

==== India ====
Laal Singh Chaddha received mixed reviews from critics and audiences. Devesh Sharma of Filmfare rated the film 4 out of 5 stars and wrote "Atul and Advait have invested more in the story than history. As a result, this has a better emotional core than the original". Sonil Dedhia of News 18 rated the film 4 out of 5 stars and wrote "Aamir Khan's Laal Singh Chaddha is a movie that deftly grapples with the pessimism of the world, but handled in a mature way". Renuka Vyavahare of The Times Of India rated the film 3.5 out of 5 stars and wrote "Laal Singh Chaddha holds onto the good old values that make it worthy of a family outing. You will particularly remember a crackling Shah Rukh Khan cameo". Stutee Ghosh of The Quint rated the film 3.5 out of 5 stars and wrote "Laal Singh Chaddha is made up of many memorable, heartwarming moments. It says a lot that will leave us smiling or moist eyed". Sukanya Verma of Rediff rated the film 3.5 out of 5 stars and wrote "Laal Singh Chaddha does not let its source down. And replacing a box of chocolates with a ready-to-eat gol gappe kit is geeeenius, like Laal's Ustad would say". Sanchita Jhunjhunwala of Zoom rated the film 3.5 out of 5 stars and wrote "The film leaves you teary-eyed, even though it doesn't make you cry, and that, we feel, makes it a job well done by the entire team!". Avinash Lohana of Pinkvilla rated the film 3 out of 5 stars and wrote "Aamir Khan and his team manage to live up to the original and present an entertaining watch". Nairita Mukherjee of India Today rated the film 3 out of 5 stars and wrote "For the most part, director Advait Chandan's Laal Singh Chaddha remains faithful to the original material".

Nandini Ramnath of Scroll.in rated the film 3 out of 5 stars and wrote "Except for a few crucial changes, the film is faithful to the beats of its source material". Rohit Bhatnagar of The Free Press Journal rated the film 3 out of 5 stars and wrote "The film is a bit too lengthy but Shah Rukh Khan's cameo will make it up for you". Sushri Sahu of Mashable rated he film 3 out of 5 stars and wrote "Laal Singh Chaddha deserves a watch for its special cameo alone". Mugdha Kapoor of DNA India rated the film 3 out of 5 stars and wrote "Laal Singh Chaddha has made a valiant effort to deliver a message of forgiveness, optimism and compassion". Saibal Chatterjee of NDTV rated the film 3 out of 5 stars and wrote "A de-aged Aamir Khan throws all that he has into the role and comes up with a simpleton who is wondrously loveable". Anna M. M. Vetticad of Firstpost rated the film 2.5 out of 5 stars and wrote "Laal Singh Chaddha must stand on its own sans comparisons since it is being viewed in 2022 by a whole generation of viewers to whom Forrest Gump is not a cultural reference that evokes nostalgia". Shubhra Gupta of The Indian Express rated the film 2 out of 5 stars and wrote "It's not just the pace of the film which is the trouble. It is also, centrally and crucially, Sardar Laal Singh Chaddha himself, as played by Aamir Khan". A critic for Bollywood Hungama rated the film 2 out of 5 stars and wrote "Despite fine performances and lovely moments the excessive length and slow pacing goes against Laal Singh Chaddha."

==== International ====
Laal Singh Chaddha received mixed reviews from international critics and audiences. Proma Khosla of Indie Wire rated the film 3.5 out of 5 stars and wrote "Kulkarni and Chandan deserve a whole box of gol gappe". Mike McCahill of The Guardian rated the film 3 out of 5 stars and wrote "Director Advait Chandan is too literal in his adaptation of the 90s classic but finds a warmth and political honesty the original lacks". Witney Seibold of Slash Film rated the film 7 out of 10 stars and wrote "Despite how corny it is, Laal Singh Chaddha it unexpectedly disarming". Carlos Aguilar of The Wrap stated "The setting and language have changed, but the story still thinks it's being uplifting about the neuroatypical even as it punches down". Siddhant Adlakha of Joy Sauce stated "Laal Singh Chaddha is an effective adaptation that not only localizes the specifics of Forrest Gump, but translates its relationship with its setting, swapping the self-professed peace and prosperity of '90s America for the more volatile and nationalistic climate of modern India, where the country's image of itself remains in constant flux". Nicolas Rapold of The New York Times commented that "The film's charms are limited by what comes to feel like a coddling conceit.".

== Accolades ==
Award	Date of the ceremony	Category	Recipients	Result	Ref.
Filmfare Awards	27 April 2023	Best Actress	Kareena Kapoor Khan	Nominated	
Filmfare Awards	27 April 2023	Best Music Director	Pritam	Nominated	
Filmfare Awards	27 April 2023	Best Special Effects	Red Chillies VFX	Nominated	
Filmfare Awards	27 April 2023	Best Lyricist	Amitabh Bhattacharya – "Tere Hawaale"	Nominated	
Filmfare Awards	27 April 2023	Best Playback Singer – Male	Sonu Nigam – "Main Ki Karaan?"	Nominated	
Filmfare Awards	27 April 2023	Best Playback Singer – Female	Shilpa Rao – "Tere Hawaale"	Nominated	
Filmfare Awards	27 April 2023	Best Sound Design	Shajith Koyeri, M. Lakshmi Naidu	Nominated	
Filmfare Awards	27 April 2023	Best Costume Design	Maxima Basu	Nominated	
Filmfare Awards	27 April 2023	Best Cinematography	Satyajit Pande	Nominated	
Filmfare Awards	27 April 2023	Best Production Design	Mustafa Stationwala	Nominated	
Zee Cine Awards	26 February 2023	Best Cinematography	Satyajit Pande	Won	

== Controversy ==
Hindu nationalists campaigned to boycott the film with Twitter hashtags, prior to the release of the film. Articles abound on the net whereby it is said that Aamir Khan continuously uses his films to insult Hindu gods and show Hindus in general in a negative light against other minority communities of India. The boycott was a reaction to Khan's remarks in 2015 about "growing intolerance" in India, his 2014 movie PK that offended Hindu nationalists, his 2017 and 2020 meeting with Turkey's president Recep Tayyip Erdoğan and his wife Emine Erdoğan, who had criticized the deaths of Muslims in the Delhi riots. Another controversial point shown in the film was that the lead character Lal Singh helps a Pakistani commander (instead of an army man of his own country which was in the original plot of Forrest Gump) which hurt the patriotic sentiments of some viewers leading to even more negative publicity which added to the boycott movement. Furthermore, review bombing on social media platforms caused the footfalls to decrease significantly.

Khan said that he was "heartbroken" after seeing this trend, and requested people to watch his film. An analysis by the Hindustan Times felt the film bombed at the box office not because of Aamir Khan's performance; but due to the changes of the original plot of the film which did not sit well with the audience.
