= Old Shell Road =

Road in Mobile, Alabama, United States

Old Shell Road is a thoroughfare located in Mobile, a city in Mobile County, Alabama, United States.

Old Shell Road is predominantly a two lane road, with a four lane section from Schillinger Road to University Boulevard, which was widened to accommodate traffic from the University of South Alabama.

== Route ==
Old Shell Road begins at Schillinger Road within the city limits of Mobile (annexed in 2007) where it proceeds eastward. West of Schillinger the roadway is known as Tanner Williams Road. Old Shell crosses into the pre-2007 city limits at Cody Road, with major intersections at Hillcrest, University, Bit & Spur, McGregor, Tuthill, Sage, Florida, Upham, Mobile Infirmary (formerly Louiselle)/Kenneth, Catherine, Lafayette, Hallett and Broad. Old Shell Road ends at Broad street, which is the traditional boundary for Downtown Mobile. Old Shell Road is located on the north side of the city of Mobile, as well as within northern Mobile County. Old Shell Road crosses Interstate 65, the traditional dividing line between the east and the west of the city, but does not have an intersection with it.

Old Shell is composed of residential, commercial, and industrial establishments, mixed throughout the road. It has maintained a highly residential character throughout and traverses some of the city's wealthiest areas as well as some of its most economically desperate areas, with these areas often being in close proximity to each other as is the case of wealthy Spring Hill and Ashland Place which have depressed Crichton in between them. Major neighborhoods and subdivisions located along Old Shell Road include: East Drive, Country Club Woods, Country Club Estates/Wimbledon, Ridgelawn, Austill, Village of Spring Hill, Crichton, Ashland Place, and 19th century homes between McGill-Toolen and Broad Street

== Education ==
Old Shell Road has a reputation as being something of an "education highway". Old Shell Road is home to three of four of Mobile's currently operational private high schools, two magnet schools, two private elementary/middle level schools and both of the city's four year colleges. Old Shell is also within a block of Mobile's only Islamic educational facility as well as a public school named for author Augusta Evans Wilson and is within two blocks of two more of the city's private schools.

The following educational institutions are located on (or near) Old Shell Road:

- Corpus Christi Catholic School, located on McKenna Drive which is a spur street off of Hillcrest Road roughly a half mile down from the Old Shell intersection.
- The University of South Alabama, centered on the intersection of Old Shell and University.
- Al-Iman Academy, located on East Drive which is a spur road of Old Shell, an Islamic school serving students up to the 11th grade.
- Spring Hill College, the oldest college in the state of Alabama and among the oldest Catholic colleges in the Southeast. Located just east of the intersection of Old Shell and McGregor Avenue.
- St. Paul's Episcopal School, located at the intersection of Old Shell Road and Tuthill Lane.
- St. Ignatius Catholic School, located at the intersection of Spring Hill Avenue and Tuthill Lane, roughly a mile north of Old Shell.
- The Murray School, a private school located in the 3800 block of Old Shell Road.
- Phillips Preparatory School, a selective admission magnet school located on Old Shell Road at the intersection of Sidney Phillips Drive.
- UMS-Wright Preparatory School, a non-sectarian private academy formed by the merger of University Military School and Julius Wright School for Girls in 1988. Located at the prior UMS campus. It is on the south side of the road between Mobile Street and the intersection of Old Shell Road and Bay Shore Avenue.
- Old Shell Road Creative and Performing Arts School. It is a selective admission magnet school located behind Phillips Preparatory.
- St. Mary's Catholic School, located in the block that is bounded by Old Shell, Providence and Lafayette. St. Mary's Catholic Church was first opened in 1865 making it one of the oldest still extant Catholic parishes in the city.
- Mary B. Austin Elementary School, a public school located in a neighborhood on Provident Lane, north of Old Shell Road.
- McGill-Toolen Catholic High School, located in the blocks that are bounded by Catherine, Old Shell and Lafayette and in the second block by Lafayette, Old Shell, Dauphin and Blacklawn. Just across the street sits St. Mary's (which does not have a high school).

== Districts ==
Old Shell Road is represented by five members of the Mobile City Council. It is wholly extant in District 7 between Cody and Hillcrest. It serves as the boundary line between Districts 6 & 7 between Hillcrest and University. It is the boundary line between 5 & 7 between University and Tuthill. It becomes extant with District 7 between Tuthill and I-65 and is wholly contained in District 1 and then District 2 in its territories in the eastern half of the city.

District 1 is represented by Fred Richardson, Council Vice-President, first elected in 1997 to fill the vacancy left by Vivian Davis Figures election to the Alabama Senate.

District 2 is represented by William Carroll, first elected in 2005.

District 5 is represented by Reggie Copeland, city council president, first elected in 1985.

District 6 is represented by Connie Hudson, first elected in 2001.

District 7 is represented by Gina Gregory, first elected in 2005.

Major neighborhoods and subdivisions located along Old Shell Road include:

East Drive, Country Club Woods, Country Club Estates/Wimbledon, Ridgelawn, Austill, Village of Spring Hill, Crichton, Ashland Place, and 19th century homes between McGill-Toolen and Broad Street

== History ==
Old Shell is also notable for its historic architecture, which is especially evident in the neighborhoods east of Florida Street, with many of the neighborhoods east of Catherine containing architecture that predates the 1880s.

OLD SHELL ROAD, MOBILE, ALABAMA

From Harper’s Weekly Journal of Civilization, New York, Saturday, September 6, 1866:

From its beginnings, c.1824 until 1850, the picturesque and tree lined Isabella Street was one of Mobile’s most popular drives.

During this same time Spring Hill was rapidly becoming Mobile’s fashionable summer resort and refuge from the dread yellow fever epidemics.

About midway through the 19th, century a group of Spring Hill’s wealthy summer residents financed from their own purses the surfacing of the original country road with shells.

To provide for the maintenance of the road, which had to be resurfaced with shells four times a year, an act of legislature, February 13th, 1850, opened Isabella Street to toll and renamed it the “Shell Road”. A toll gate located near Stickney’s Hollow (now known as Fernway) charged 25 and 50 cents per vehicle.

Beginning at Broad Street, the “Shell Road” passed through Stickney’s Hollow, along the fringes of Summerville (now Spring Hill Avenue) skirting Ashland, the home of Mrs. Augusta Evans Wilson (now Ashland Place) near Nepoleonville (now Crichton) eventually climbing “The Hill” and ending majestically at Spring Hill College.

On February 10th., 1854, a second act of legislature authorized the construction of another shell road along Mobile Bay. It was at that time, so as to distinguish one from the other, that the original “Shell Road” was renamed “Old Shell Road".

A 1927 Census reveals that some of the last surviving Confederate widows in Alabama resided on Old Shell Road.
