= Marlena Smalls =

American educator and musician

- Born: Ohio, U.S.
- Education: Central State University
- Occupations: Educator and musician
- Known for: Founder and director of the Hallelujah Singers

Marlena Smalls is an American educator and musician of Gullah origin. She is the founder and director of the Hallelujah Singers.

== Early life ==
Smalls was born in Ohio, United States, to parents from South Carolina, one of their eight children. She attended Central State University in Ohio.

== Career ==
In 1984, Smalls founded the Gullah Festival in Beaufort, South Carolina. Five years later, she formed the Hallelujah Singers to preserve the Gullah culture of the Sea Islands of South Carolina. The group has been designated a Local Legacy of South Carolina by the Library of Congress.

Smalls played the mother of Bubba in the 1994 film Forrest Gump.

She retired from touring and performing in 2024.

== Personal life ==
After divorcing, Smalls relocated from Dayton, Ohio, to Beaufort, South Carolina, with her six children in 1982. She began working as Arts Coordinator for the City of Beaufort. She and her mother (who grew up in Honea Path, South Carolina) also established the Lowcountry School for Music, where they provided piano and vocals lessons to students in the Beaufort area. They had almost two hundred students in their early years. The parents of some of her students became the original version of the Hallelujah Singers.

Smalls was inducted into the South Carolina Black Hall of Fame in 2004. She received an honorary doctorate from the University of South Carolina.
