= AJ Finley =

American football player (born 2001)

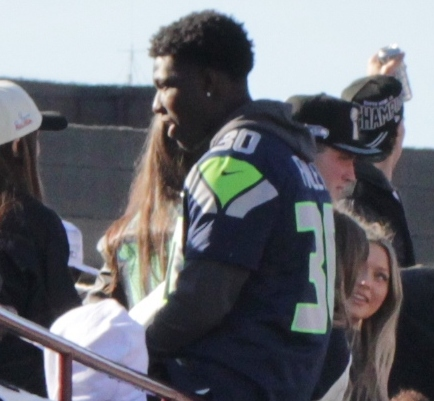
- Finley in 2026

No. 20 – Pittsburgh Steelers
- Position: Safety
- Roster status: Practice squad

Personal information
- Born: September 14, 2001 (age 25); Mobile, Alabama, U.S.
- Listed height: 6 ft 2 in (1.88 m)
- Listed weight: 202 lb (92 kg)

Career information
- High school: St. Paul's Episcopal School (Mobile, Alabama)
- College: Ole Miss (2019–2022)
- NFL draft: 2023: undrafted

Career history
- Los Angeles Chargers (2023–2024); Seattle Seahawks (2024–2026); Pittsburgh Steelers (2026–present)*
- * Offseason or practice squad member only

Awards and highlights
- Super Bowl champion (LX); Second-team All-SEC (2021)

Career NFL statistics as of Week 4, 2026
- Total tackles: 19
- Forced fumbles: 1
- Stats at Pro Football Reference

Allister Edward "AJ" Finley Jr. (born September 14, 2001) is an American professional football safety for the Pittsburgh Steelers of the National Football League (NFL). He played college football for the Ole Miss Rebels.

== Early life ==
Finley grew up in Mobile, Alabama, and attended St. Paul's Episcopal School. As a senior, he put up six interceptions. On June 29, 2018, Finley committed to play college football at Ole Miss over other schools such as Duke, Iowa, Purdue, Tennessee, and Wake Forest.

== College career ==
Finley played four years at Ole Miss and recorded 244 tackles, 8.5 being for a loss, eight interceptions, 13 pass deflections, four fumble recoveries, two forced fumbles, and a touchdown. In his first season he posted 16 tackles, two for a loss, and two fumble recoveries. However, in Finley's second season he had a breakout year putting up 62 tackles, two going for a loss, three interceptions, seven pass deflections, and a fumble recovery. Finley's third season was his best collegiate year where he had 90 tackles, one going for a loss, three interceptions, including returning one for a touchdown, four pass deflections, and a forced fumble. For his performance on the year he was named an AP All-Southeastern Conference (SEC) second-team. Finley also had an outstanding fourth year in 2022 where he posted 76 tackles, 3.5 being for a loss, two interceptions, two pass deflections, and a forced fumble, After the conclusion of the 2022 season Finley declared for the NFL draft.

== Professional career ==
Pre-draft measurables
Height	Weight	Arm length	Hand span	Wingspan	40-yard dash	10-yard split	20-yard split	20-yard shuttle	Three-cone drill	Vertical jump	Broad jump	Bench press
6 ft 2 3/8 in (1.89 m)	202 lb (92 kg)	32 1/2 in (0.83 m)	9 7/8 in (0.25 m)	6 ft 7 in (2.01 m)	4.57 s	1.63 s	2.61 s	4.22 s	6.93 s	35.5 in (0.90 m)	9 ft 11 in (3.02 m)	11 reps
All values from Pro Day

=== Los Angeles Chargers ===
After not being selected in the 2023 NFL draft, Finley signed with the Los Angeles Chargers as an undrafted free agent. Finley made the Chargers' initial 53 man roster out of training camp. After being inactive the first two games, he was waived on September 23, 2023 and re-signed to the practice squad. He was promoted back to the active roster on September 30.

Finley was waived by the Chargers on November 25, 2024.

=== Seattle Seahawks ===
On November 26, 2024, Finley was claimed off waivers by the Seattle Seahawks. He was placed on injured reserve on August 5, 2025.

On March 11, 2026, Finley re-signed with the Seahawks. He was waived by Seattle on August 30 as a part of final roster cuts, and re-signed a day later to the practice squad. On September 9, Finley was signed to the active roster. He was waived on October 6 and re-signed to the practice squad the next day. He was waived again on November 12.

=== Pittsburgh Steelers ===
On November 17, 2026, Finley signed with the Pittsburgh Steelers practice squad.
