= Forrest Gump =

1994 American film by Robert Zemeckis

- Theatrical release poster
- Directed by: Robert Zemeckis
- Screenplay by: Eric Roth
- Based on: Forrest Gump by Winston Groom
- Produced by: Wendy Finerman; Steve Tisch; Steve Starkey
- Starring: Tom Hanks; Robin Wright; Gary Sinise; Mykelti Williamson; Sally Field
- Cinematography: Don Burgess
- Edited by: Arthur Schmidt
- Music by: Alan Silvestri
- Production company: The Tisch Company
- Distributed by: Paramount Pictures
- Release dates: June 23, 1994 (Los Angeles); July 6, 1994 (United States)
- Running time: 142 minutes
- Country: United States
- Language: English
- Budget: $55 million
- Box office: $678 million

Forrest Gump is a 1994 American comedy-drama film directed by Robert Zemeckis. An adaptation of the 1986 novel of the same name by Winston Groom, the film's screenplay was written by Eric Roth. It stars Tom Hanks in the title role, alongside Robin Wright, Gary Sinise, Mykelti Williamson, and Sally Field in lead roles. The film follows the life of an Alabama man named Forrest Gump (Hanks) and his experiences in the 20th-century United States.

Principal photography took place between August and December 1993, mainly in the tri-states Georgia, North Carolina, and South Carolina. Extensive visual effects were used to incorporate Hanks into archived footage and to develop other scenes. The soundtrack features songs reflecting the different periods seen in the film. Various interpretations have been made of the protagonist and the film's political symbolism.

Forrest Gump was released in the United States by Paramount Pictures on July 6, 1994, and received widespread critical acclaim for Zemeckis's direction, the performances (particularly those of Hanks and Sinise), story, writing, emotional weight, visual effects, music, character development and screenplay. The film was a major success at the box office: it became the top-grossing film in the United States released that year and earned over US$678 million worldwide against a $55 million budget during its theatrical run, making it the second-highest-grossing film of 1994, behind The Lion King. The soundtrack sold over 12 million copies. Forrest Gump is often regarded as one of the greatest and most influential films ever made, and won six Academy Awards: Best Picture, Best Director, Best Actor for Hanks, Best Adapted Screenplay, Best Visual Effects, and Best Film Editing. It received many award nominations, including Golden Globes, British Academy Film Awards, and Screen Actors Guild Awards.

In 2011, the Library of Congress selected the film for preservation in the United States National Film Registry as being "culturally, historically, or aesthetically significant".

== Plot ==
In 1981, a feather lands at a bus stop in Savannah, Georgia; Forrest Gump collects it, then recounts his life story to strangers on a bus bench.

In the fictional city of Greenbow, Alabama during the 1950s, Forrest is fitted with leg braces to correct a curved spine. His mother runs a boarding house out of their home. Among their tenants is Elvis Presley, who incorporates Forrest's jerky dance movements into his performances. On his first day of school, Forrest befriends a girl named Jenny Curran.

Forrest is often bullied because of his physical disability and low intelligence. While fleeing from several bullies, his leg braces break off, revealing Forrest to be a very fast runner. In 1963, after inadvertently interrupting a practice session of the University of Alabama football team, Forrest is noticed by coach Bear Bryant, who offers him an athletic scholarship. Forrest plays as a kick returner, is later named to the All-America college football team, and meets President John F. Kennedy at the White House. He also witnesses Governor George Wallace's Stand in the Schoolhouse Door, during which Forrest returns a dropped book to Vivian Malone Jones.

After graduating college in 1966, Forrest enlists into the U.S. Army where he befriends Benjamin Buford "Bubba" Blue, who convinces Forrest to go into the shrimping business with him after their service. They arrive in Vietnam in 1967 and serve with the 9th Infantry Division in the Mekong Delta. Their platoon is ambushed during a patrol. Despite being shot, Forrest saves several wounded platoon mates – including his lieutenant, Dan Taylor, who has suffered severe leg injuries – but Bubba is killed. Forrest is awarded the Medal of Honor for his heroism by President Lyndon B. Johnson.

At the anti-war March on the Pentagon rally, Forrest meets Abbie Hoffman and briefly reunites with Jenny, who has been living a hippie life. While healing from his injury, Forrest develops a talent for ping-pong, and becomes a sports celebrity as he competes against Chinese teams in ping-pong diplomacy, earning him an interview alongside John Lennon on The Dick Cavett Show, influencing the song "Imagine". He spends the 1971 New Year's Eve in New York City with Dan, who lost his legs as a result of his injuries and has become a deeply embittered alcoholic. Forrest meets President Richard Nixon, who arranges a room for Forrest in the Watergate Hotel, where he unwittingly exposes the Watergate scandal.

Discharged from the Army, Forrest returns to Alabama and endorses a ping-pong paddle manufacturer, using the earnings to buy a shrimping boat in Bayou La Batre, fulfilling his promise to Bubba. Dan joins Forrest in 1974, but their business initially starts off slow. The pair's fortunes turn after their boat becomes the sole survivor of Hurricane Carmen. They create the Bubba Gump Shrimp Company; Dan reconciles himself to his disabilities, and finally thanks Forrest for saving his life. Forrest returns home to his mother as she dies of cancer. Dan invests their money into what he initially believes is a "fruit company", which later turns out to be Apple Computer, and the two become millionaires. Forrest shares his earnings with the community and Bubba's family.

Jenny returns to stay with Forrest in 1976, recovering from years of abuse, drugs, and prostitution. Forrest proposes marriage, but Jenny turns him down. After a night of sexual intercourse, Jenny leaves the next morning. Heartbroken, Forrest spends the next three years in a relentless cross-country run.

In 1981, Forrest reveals that he is waiting at the bus stop because he received a letter from Jenny inviting him to visit. She introduces him to their son, Forrest Gump Jr. Jenny tells Forrest she is sick with an unknown incurable virus, and the three move back to Forrest's home in Alabama. Jenny and Forrest marry, but she dies a year later. Forrest sends his son off on his first day of school as the feather from the movie's opening floats away in the wind.

== Cast ==
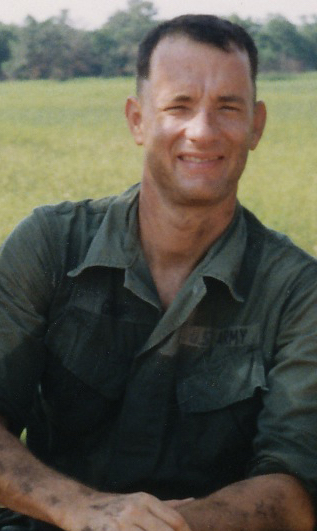
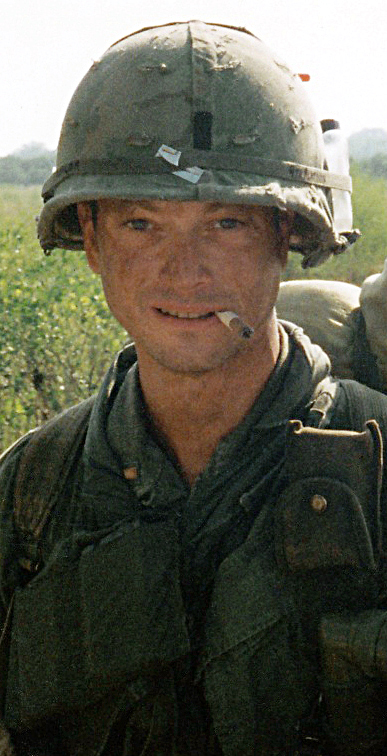
Tom Hanks and Gary Sinise on the film set in 1993
- Tom Hanks as Forrest Gump: At an early age, Forrest is deemed to have a below-average IQ of 75. He has an endearing character and shows devotion to his loved ones and duties, character traits that bring him into many life-changing situations. Along the way, he encounters many historical figures and events throughout his life. Hanks also briefly plays Nathan Bedford Forrest in The Birth of a Nation scene.
  - Michael Conner Humphreys as young Forrest Gump: Hanks revealed in interviews that instead of having Humphreys copy his accent, he incorporated Humphreys' unique Southern accented drawl into the older character's accent.
- Robin Wright as Jenny Curran: Forrest's childhood friend with whom he immediately falls in love, and never stops loving throughout his life. A victim of child sexual abuse at the hands of her bitter, widowed father, Jenny embarks on a different path from Forrest, leading a self-destructive life and becoming part of the hippie movement in California in the 1960s and the following Me Decade's sex and drug culture of the 1970s. She re-enters Forrest's life at various times in adulthood. Jenny eventually becomes a waitress in Savannah, Georgia, where she lives in an apartment with her (and Forrest's) son, Forrest Jr. She and Forrest marry, but soon afterward she dies from complications due to an unnamed disease. This was intended by Winston Groom, the author of the original novel, to be hepatitis C, itself an "unknown virus" until defined in April 1989, although some of the makers of the film have said that they intended it to be HIV/AIDS.
  - Hanna R. Hall as young Jenny Curran.
- Gary Sinise as Lieutenant Dan Taylor: Forrest and Bubba's platoon leader during the Vietnam War, whose ancestors have died in every major war the U.S. has fought in and who regards it as his destiny to do the same. After losing his legs in an ambush and being rescued against his will by Forrest, he is initially bitter and antagonistic toward Forrest for leaving him a "cripple" and denying him his family's destiny, falling into a deep depression. He later serves as Forrest's first mate at the Bubba Gump Shrimp Company, gives most of the orders, becomes wealthy with Forrest, and regains his will to live. He ultimately forgives and thanks Forrest for saving his life. By the end of the film, he is engaged to be married to his fiancée Susan and is sporting "magic legs" – titanium alloy prosthetics that allow him to walk again.
- Mykelti Williamson as Benjamin Buford "Bubba" Blue: Bubba was originally supposed to be the senior partner in the Bubba Gump Shrimp Company, but due to his death in Vietnam, their platoon leader, Dan Taylor, took his place. The company posthumously carried his name. Forrest later gave Bubba's mother (Marlena Smalls) Bubba's share of the business. Throughout filming, Williamson wore a lip attachment to create Bubba's protruding lip.
- Sally Field as Mrs. Gump: Forrest's mother. Field reflected on the character, "She's a woman who loves her son unconditionally.... A lot of her dialogue sounds like slogans, and that's just what she intends."
- Haley Joel Osment as Forrest Gump Jr.: Osment was cast in the film after the casting director noticed him in a 1993 Pizza Hut commercial. It was his debut feature film role.
- Peter Dobson as Elvis Presley: Although Kurt Russell was uncredited, he provided the voice for Elvis in the scene.
- Dick Cavett as himself: Cavett played a de-aged version of himself in the 1970s, with makeup applied to make him appear younger. Consequently, Cavett is the only well-known figure in the film to play a cameo role rather than be represented through the use of archival footage like John Lennon, Alabama Governor George Wallace, and Presidents John F. Kennedy, Lyndon B. Johnson and Richard Nixon.
- Sam Anderson as Principal Hancock: Forrest's elementary school principal.
- Geoffrey Blake as Wesley: A member of the SDS group and Jenny's abusive boyfriend.
- Siobhan Fallon Hogan as Dorothy Harris: The school bus driver who drives Forrest, and later his son, to school.
- Sonny Shroyer as Coach Paul "Bear" Bryant.
- Grand L. Bush, Michael Jace, Conor Kennelly, and Teddy Lane Jr. as the Black Panthers.
- Richard D'Alessandro as Abbie Hoffman.
- Tiffany Salerno and Marla Sucharetza as "Cunning" Carla and "Long-Limbs" Lenore: a couple of prostitutes whom Forrest and Dan spend a New Year's evening with and later turn away.
- Harold G. Herthum as Doctor: The family doctor who fits Forrest with leg braces to fix his curved spine at the start of the film. He later makes another appearance when Forrest's mother dies from cancer.

== Production ==
=== Pre-production and script ===
The writer, Eric Roth, departed substantially from the book. We flipped the two elements of the book, making the love story primary and the fantastic adventures secondary. Also, the book was cynical and colder than the movie. In the movie, Gump is a completely decent character, always true to his word. He has no agenda and no opinion about anything except Jenny, his mother and God.

— director Robert Zemeckis

The film is based on the 1986 novel by Winston Groom, with ImageMovers as the production company, which was known as South Side Amusement Company. Both center on the character of Forrest Gump. However, the film primarily focuses on the first eleven chapters of the novel before skipping ahead to the end of the novel, with the founding of Bubba Gump Shrimp Co. and the meeting with Forrest Jr. In addition to skipping some parts of the novel, the film adds several aspects to Gump's life that do not occur in the novel, such as his needing leg braces as a child and his run across the United States.

Gump's core character and personality are also changed from the novel; among other things, his film character is less of a savant – in the novel, while playing football at the university, he fails craft and gym but receives a perfect score in an advanced physics class he is enrolled in by his coach to satisfy his college requirements. The novel also features Gump as an astronaut, a professional wrestler, and a chess player.

The book had a bidding war regarding an adaptation even before publication, with Wendy Finerman and Steve Tisch acquiring them by joining forces with Warner Bros., where Finerman's husband Mark Canton was president of production. Groom was paid $500,000 and also wrote the first three first drafts of the screenplay, which leaned closer to the events of the novel. After Rain Man told the story of a savant, Warner Bros. lost interest in the picture, and by 1990 the project was in turnaround. Finerman contacted Columbia Pictures, who went on to reject it, while hiring Eric Roth to rewrite the script. Roth and Finerman kept in contact with Groom to ensure the script was historically accurate. Roth delivered a screenplay in 1992, which Paramount Pictures chairwoman Sherry Lansing liked enough to bring the project to her studio, who acquired the rights from Warner Bros. in exchange for the script for Executive Decision.

Ivan Reitman, Penny Marshall and Terry Gilliam passed on the project before Robert Zemeckis was hired. Barry Sonnenfeld was attached to the film, but left to direct Addams Family Values.

=== Casting ===
John Travolta was the original choice to play the title role and later said that passing on the role was a mistake. After turning down the role, he went on to play a role in Pulp Fiction instead. Bill Murray, Chevy Chase, and Matthew Broderick were also considered for the role. Sean Penn had stated in an interview that he had been the second choice for the role; he would later portray a character with a disability in the 2001 film I Am Sam. Tom Hanks revealed that he signed on to the film after an hour and a half of reading the script. He dropped out of the role of Andy Dufresne in The Shawshank Redemption in favor of Forrest Gump. Hanks initially wanted to ease Forrest's pronounced Southern accent, but was eventually persuaded by director Robert Zemeckis to portray the heavy accent stressed in the novel. Hanks also said it took him three days producing unusable footage in order to learn how to play the role. Winston Groom, who wrote the original novel, describes the film as having taken the "rough edges" off the character whom he had envisioned being played by John Goodman. Additionally, Tom's younger brother Jim Hanks is his acting double in the movie for the scenes whenever Forrest was running. Tom's daughter Elizabeth Hanks appears in the movie as the girl on the school bus who refuses to let young Forrest sit next to her. Sally Field agreed to take on the role of Mrs. Gump after reading the script. Jodie Foster turned down the role of Jenny, the filmmakers eventually settled on Robin Wright for the role. Joe Pesci and Kevin Bacon were considered for the role of Lieutenant Dan Taylor, which was eventually given to Gary Sinise. Sinise drew inspiration from the struggles that Vietnam War veterans, some on his wife's side of his family, were going through when returning from serving in Vietnam. David Alan Grier, Ice Cube and Dave Chappelle were offered the role of Benjamin Buford Blue, but all three turned it down. Chappelle, who said he believed the film would be unsuccessful, has been reported as saying that he regrets not taking the role. Hanks was aware of Chappelle's disappointment in missing out on the part and agreed to work with him in a future movie, which ended up being You've Got Mail. Rapper Tupac Shakur also auditioned.

=== Filming ===
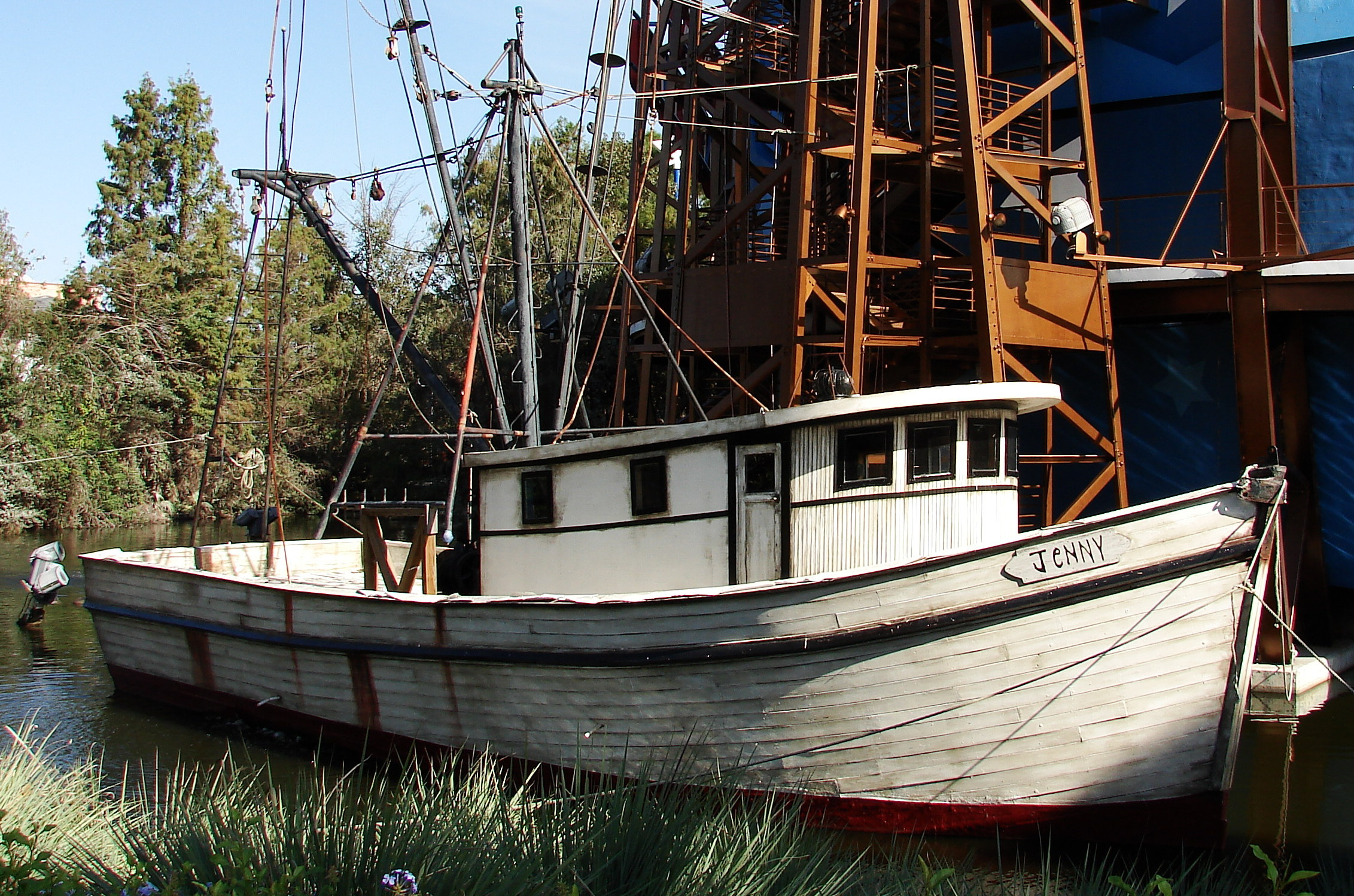
The shrimping boat Forrest used in the film

Filming began in August 1993 and ended in December of that year. Although most of the film is set in Alabama, filming took place mainly in and around Beaufort, South Carolina, as well as parts of coastal Virginia and North Carolina, including a running shot on the Blue Ridge Parkway near Grandfather Mountain where a part of the road subsequently became known as "Forrest Gump Curve". Downtown portions of the fictional town of Greenbow were filmed in Varnville, South Carolina. The studio was about to pull the plug on the film as there was no money left in the budget, until Zemeckis and Hanks cut the running sequence in the middle. Zemeckis and Hanks used their own money for the sequence. The scene of Forrest running through Vietnam while under fire was filmed on Hunting Island State Park and Fripp Island, South Carolina. Additional filming took place on the Biltmore Estate in Asheville, North Carolina.

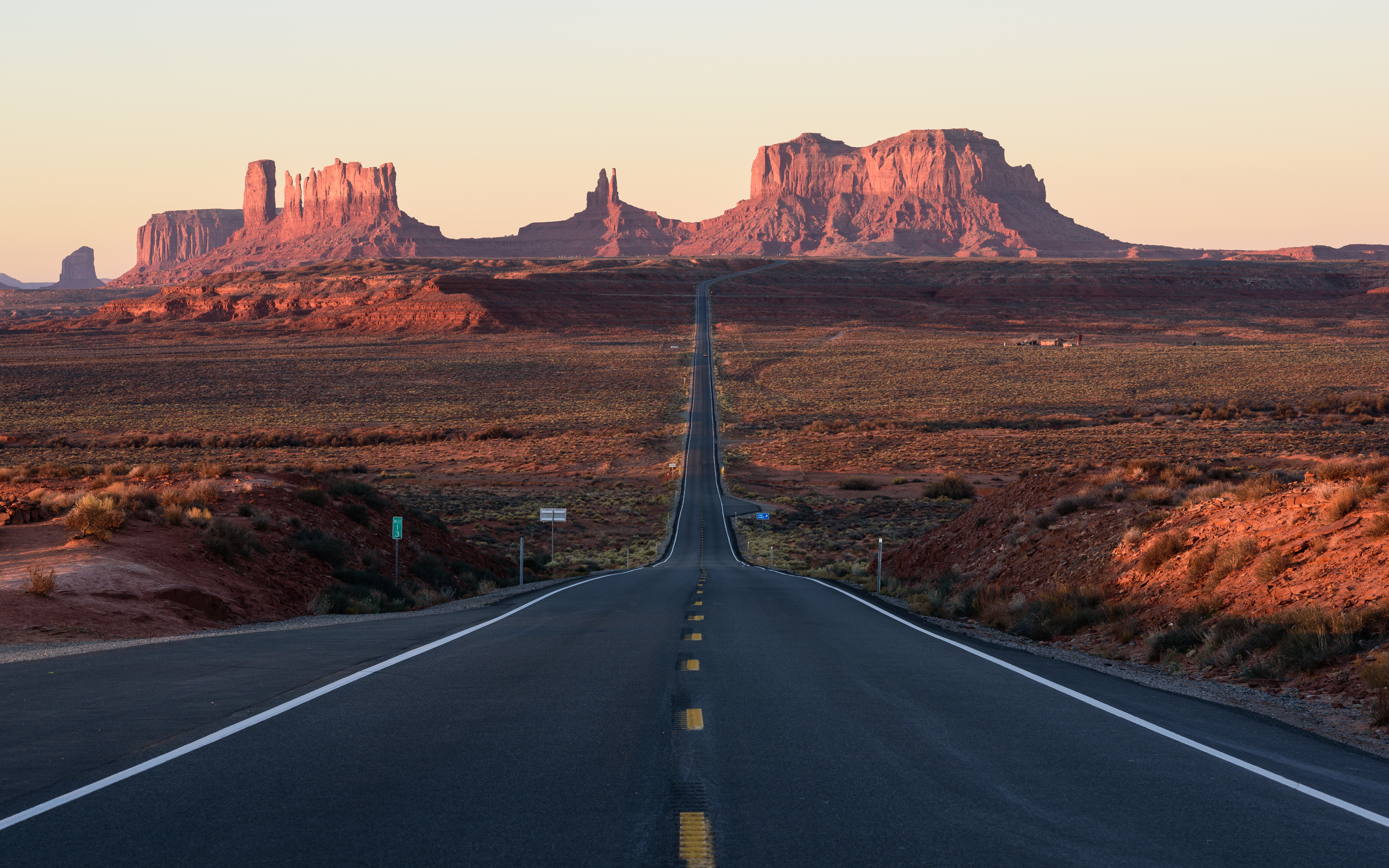
The location along U.S. Route 163 in Monument Valley where Forrest ends his run

The Gump family home set was built along the Combahee River near Yemassee, South Carolina, and the nearby land was used to film Curran's home as well as some of the Vietnam scenes. Over 20 palmetto trees were planted to improve the Vietnam scenes. Throughout the film, Forrest narrates his life story on a bus stop bench, which was filmed at the northern edge of Chippewa Square in Savannah, Georgia. There were other scenes filmed in and around the Savannah area as well, including a running shot on the Richard V. Woods Memorial Bridge in Beaufort while he was being interviewed by the press, and on West Bay Street in Savannah. Most of the college campus scenes were filmed in Los Angeles at the University of Southern California. The lighthouse that Forrest runs across to reach the Atlantic Ocean the first time is the Marshall Point Lighthouse in Port Clyde, Maine. Additional scenes were filmed in Arizona, Utah's Monument Valley, and Montana's Glacier National Park.

=== Visual effects ===
Forrest with President Kennedy. A variety of visual effects were used to incorporate Hanks into archive footage with various historical figures and events.

Ken Ralston and his team at Industrial Light & Magic were responsible for the film's visual effects. Using CGI techniques, it was possible to depict Forrest meeting deceased personages and shaking their hands. Hanks was first shot against a blue screen along with reference markers so that he could line up with the archive footage. To record the voices of the historical figures, voice actors were filmed and special effects were used to alter lip-syncing for the new dialogue. Archival footage was used and with the help of such techniques as chroma key, image warping, morphing, and rotoscoping, Hanks was integrated into it.

In one Vietnam War scene, Forrest carries Bubba away from an incoming napalm attack. To create the effect, stunt actors were initially used for compositing purposes. Then, Hanks and Williamson were filmed, with Williamson supported by a cable wire as Hanks ran with him. The explosion was then filmed, and the actors were digitally added to appear just in front of the explosions. The jet fighters and napalm canisters were also added by CGI.

The CGI removal of actor Gary Sinise's legs, after his character had them amputated, was achieved by wrapping his legs with a blue fabric, which later facilitated the work of the "roto-paint" team to paint out his legs from every single frame. At one point, while hoisting himself into his wheelchair, his legs are used for support.

The scene where Forrest spots Jenny at a peace rally at the Lincoln Memorial and the Lincoln Memorial Reflecting Pool in Washington, D.C., required visual effects to create the large crowd of people. Over two days of filming, approximately 1,500 extras were used. At each successive take, the extras were rearranged and moved into a different quadrant away from the camera. With the help of computers, the extras were multiplied to create a crowd of several hundred thousand people.

== Reception and legacy ==
=== Box office ===
Produced on a budget of $55 million, Forrest Gump opened in 1,332 theaters in the United States and Canada on Wednesday, July 6, 1994, and grossed more than $8 million in its first two days before expanding on Friday to 1,595 theaters and grossing $24,450,602 in its opening weekend, Paramount's biggest opening non-holiday weekend gross, surpassing the record set by The Addams Family. Motion picture business consultant and screenwriter Jeffrey Hilton suggested to producer Wendy Finerman to double the prints and advertising budget based on his viewing of an early print of the film. The budget was immediately increased, in line with his advice. In its opening weekend, the film placed first at the US box office, narrowly beating The Lion King, which was in its fourth week of release. During its next weekend, it ranked second behind True Lies with $24.1 million. For the first twelve weeks of release, the film was in the top three at the US box office, topping the list five times, including in its tenth week of release, when it surpassed Raiders of the Lost Ark as Paramount's highest-grossing film in the United States and Canada. Paramount removed the film from release in the United States when its gross hit $300 million in January 1995, and it was the second-highest-grossing film of the year, behind The Lion King with $305 million. The film was reissued on February 17, 1995, after the Academy Awards nominations were announced. After the reissue in 1,100 theaters, the film grossed an additional $29 million in the United States and Canada, bringing its total to $329.7 million, making it the third-highest-grossing film at that time, behind E.T. the Extra-Terrestrial and Jurassic Park. Box Office Mojo estimates that the film sold over 78.5 million tickets in the US and Canada in its initial theatrical run.

The film was the fastest grossing Paramount film to pass $100 million (18 days), $200 million (46 days; fourth fastest in history), and $300 million (193 days) in box office receipts (at the time of its release). After reissues, the film has gross receipts of $330,252,182 in the U.S. and Canada and $347,693,217 in international markets for a total of $677,945,399 worldwide. Ultimately, it finished as the fourth highest grossing film of the 1990s in the United States and Canada.

With such revenue, the film was called a "successful failure"; due to distributors' and exhibitors' high fees, Paramount's losses totaled in at $62 million, leaving executives desiring better deals. This has also been associated with Hollywood accounting, where expenses are inflated to minimize profit sharing.

Forrest Gump held the record for being the highest-grossing Paramount film until it was overtaken by Titanic three years later in 1997. It remained the highest-grossing film solely distributed by Paramount until it was surpassed by Shrek the Third 13 years later in 2007.

For twelve years, it remained as the highest-grossing film starring Tom Hanks; it was surpassed in 2006 by The Da Vinci Code.

=== Critical reception ===
On the review aggregator website Rotten Tomatoes, 75% of 158 critics' reviews are positive, with an average rating of 7.80/10. The website's consensus reads: "Tom Hanks' rigorously earnest performance keeps Forrest Gump sincere even when it gets glib with American history, making for a whimsical odyssey of debatable wisdom but undeniable heart." At the website Metacritic, the film earned a rating of 82 out of 100 based on 21 reviews by mainstream critics, indicating "universal acclaim". Audiences polled by CinemaScore gave the film a rare "A+" grade.

The story was commended by several critics. Roger Ebert of the Chicago Sun-Times wrote, "I've never met anyone like Forrest Gump in a movie before, and for that matter I've never seen a movie quite like 'Forrest Gump.' Any attempt to describe him will risk making the movie seem more conventional than it is, but let me try. It's a comedy, I guess. Or maybe a drama. Or a dream. The screenplay by Eric Roth has the complexity of modern fiction....The performance is a breathtaking balancing act between comedy and sadness, in a story rich in big laughs and quiet truths...What a magical movie." Todd McCarthy of Variety wrote that the film "has been very well worked out on all levels, and manages the difficult feat of being an intimate, even delicate tale played with an appealingly light touch against an epic backdrop." In contrast, Anthony Lane of The New Yorker called the film "Warm, wise, and wearisome as hell." Owen Gleiberman of Entertainment Weekly said that the film was "glib, shallow, and monotonous" and "reduces the tumult of the last few decades to a virtual-reality theme park: a baby-boomer version of Disney's America."

Gump garnered comparisons to fictional character Huckleberry Finn, as well as U.S. politicians Ronald Reagan, Pat Buchanan and Bill Clinton. Peter Chomo writes that Gump acts as a "social mediator and as an agent of redemption in divided times". Peter Travers of Rolling Stone called Gump "everything we admire in the American character – honest, brave, and loyal with a heart of gold." The New York Times reviewer Janet Maslin called Gump a "hollow man" who is "self-congratulatory in his blissful ignorance, warmly embraced as the embodiment of absolutely nothing." Marc Vincenti of Palo Alto Weekly called the character "a pitiful stooge taking the pie of life in the face, thoughtfully licking his fingers." Bruce Kawin and Gerald Mast's textbook on film history said that Forrest Gump's dimness was a metaphor for glamorized nostalgia in that he represented a blank slate onto which the Baby Boomer generation projected their memories of those events.

=== Re-evaluation ===
Writing in 2004, Entertainment Weekly said, "Nearly a decade after it earned gazillions and swept the Oscars, Robert Zemeckis' ode to 20th-century America still represents one of cinema's most clearly drawn lines in the sand. One half of folks see it as an artificial piece of pop melodrama, while everyone else raves that it's sweet as a box of chocolates."

In 2015, The Hollywood Reporter polled hundreds of academy members, asking them to re-vote on past controversial decisions. Academy members said that, given a second chance, they would award the 1994 Oscar for Best Picture to The Shawshank Redemption instead.

=== Author payment ===
Winston Groom was paid $350,000 for the screenplay rights to his novel Forrest Gump and was contracted for a 3 percent share of the film's net profits. When the film became a major commercial success, Groom received none of the net profit participation. Paramount maintained that the film had not yet shown a profit under its accounting practices. Tom Hanks, by contrast, contracted for a percent share of the film's gross receipts instead of a salary, and he and director Zemeckis each received $40 million.

Groom's dispute with Paramount was later resolved after Groom declared he was satisfied with Paramount's explanation of their accounting, this coinciding with Groom receiving a seven-figure contract with Paramount, plus a percentage of the gross profits, for film rights to another of his books, Gump & Co. This film was never made, due to a combination of factors, including a rocky development process, Tom Hanks' reluctance to make a sequel, and the September 11 terrorist attacks.

=== Home video ===
Forrest Gump was first released on VHS on April 27, 1995, and on LaserDisc the following day. The LaserDisc was THX certified and released without chapters, requiring the film be watched start to finish. Film magazines of the period stated this was at the request of Zemeckis who wanted viewers to enjoy the film in its entirety. It became the best-selling adult sell-through video, with sales of over 12 million. A widescreen VHS release debuted a year later on September 10, 1996. It was released in a two-disc DVD set on August 28, 2001. Special features included director and producer commentaries, production featurettes, and screen tests. The film was released on Blu-ray in November 2009. Paramount released the film on Ultra HD Blu-ray in June 2018. On May 7, 2019, Paramount Pictures released a newly remastered two-disc Blu-ray that contains bonus content.

=== Accolades ===
Forrest Gump won Best Picture, Best Actor in a Leading Role (Hanks had won the previous year for Philadelphia), Best Director, Best Visual Effects, Best Adapted Screenplay, and Best Film Editing at the 67th Academy Awards. The film was nominated for seven Golden Globe Awards, winning three of them: Best Actor – Motion Picture Drama, Best Director – Motion Picture, and Best Motion Picture – Drama. The film was also nominated for six Saturn Awards and won two for Best Fantasy Film and Best Supporting Actor (Film).

In addition to the film's multiple awards and nominations, it has also been recognized by the American Film Institute on several of its lists. The film ranks 37th on 100 Years...100 Cheers, 71st on 100 Years...100 Movies, and 76th on 100 Years...100 Movies (10th Anniversary Edition). In addition, the quote "Mama always said life was like a box of chocolates. You never know what you're gonna get," was ranked 40th on 100 Years...100 Movie Quotes. The film also ranked at number 61 on Empire's list of the 100 Greatest Movies of All Time. In 2006, Writers Guild of America West ranked its screenplay 89th in WGA's list of 101 Greatest Screenplays.

In December 2011, Forrest Gump was selected for preservation in the Library of Congress' National Film Registry. The Registry said that the film was "honored for its technological innovations (the digital insertion of Gump seamlessly into vintage archival footage), its resonance within the culture that has elevated Gump (and what he represents in terms of American innocence) to the status of folk hero, and its attempt to engage both playfully and seriously with contentious aspects of the era's traumatic history."

American Film Institute lists

- AFI's 100 Years...100 Movies – #71
- AFI's 100 Years...100 Movie Quotes:
  - "Mama always said life was like a box of chocolates. You never know what you're gonna get." – #40
- AFI's 100 Years...100 Cheers – #37
- AFI's 100 Years...100 Movies (10th Anniversary Edition) – #76

== Symbolism ==
=== Feather ===
I don't want to sound like a bad version of "the child within". But the childlike innocence of Forrest Gump is what we all once had. It's an emotional journey. You laugh and cry. It does what movies are supposed to do: make you feel alive.

— producer Wendy Finerman

Various interpretations have been suggested for the feather present at the opening and conclusion of the film. Sarah Lyall of The New York Times noted several suggestions made about the feather: "Does the white feather symbolize The Unbearable Lightness of Being? Forrest Gump's impaired intellect? The randomness of experience?" Hanks interpreted the feather as: "Our destiny is only defined by how we deal with the chance elements to our life and that's kind of the embodiment of the feather as it comes in. Here is this thing that can land anywhere and that it lands at your feet. It has theological implications that are really huge." Sally Field compared the feather to fate, saying: "It blows in the wind and just touches down here or there. Was it planned or was it just perchance?" Visual effects supervisor Ken Ralston compared the feather to an abstract painting: "It can mean so many things to so many different people."

=== Political interpretations ===
Critics have offered various political interpretations of the film, including that it promotes American conservatism and symbolizes the death of the 1960s counterculture. CNN's Crossfire debated in 1994 whether the film embodied these themes. Hanks has stated that "the film is non-political and thus non-judgmental", and producer Steve Tisch has similarly denied that the film has a political message.

All over the political map, people have been calling Forrest their own. But, Forrest Gump isn't about politics or conservative values. It's about humanity, it's about respect, tolerance and unconditional love.

— producer Steve Tisch, accepting the Academy Award for Best Picture

Thomas Byers called it "an aggressively conservative film" in a Modern Fiction Studies article. It has been said that while Gump follows a very conservative lifestyle, Jenny's life is full of countercultural embrace, complete with drug use, promiscuity, and antiwar rallies, and that their eventual marriage might be a kind of reconciliation. Jennifer Hyland Wang argues in a Cinema Journal article that Jenny's death to an unnamed virus "symbolizes the death of liberal America and the death of the protests that defined a decade" in the 1960s. She also said that the film's screenwriter, Eric Roth, developed the screenplay from the novel and transferred to Jenny "all of Gump's flaws and most of the excesses committed by Americans in the 1960s and 1970s".

Other commentators believe the film forecast the 1994 Republican Revolution and used the image of Forrest Gump to promote movement leader Newt Gingrich's traditional, conservative values. Jennifer Hyland Wang said that the film idealizes the 1950s, as made evident by the lack of "Whites Only"-signs in Gump's Southern childhood, and envisions the 1960s as a period of social conflict and confusion. She said that this sharp contrast between the decades criticizes the counterculture values and reaffirms conservatism. Wang said that the film was used by Republican politicians to illustrate a "traditional version of recent history" to gear voters toward their ideology for the congressional elections. Then-presidential candidate Bob Dole stated that the film's message was "no matter how great the adversity, the American Dream is within everybody's reach".

In 1995, National Review included Forrest Gump in its list of the "Best 100 Conservative Movies" of all time, and ranked it number four on its "25 Best Conservative Movies of the Last 25 Years" list. National Review's John Miller wrote that "Tom Hanks plays the title-character, an amiable dunce who is far too smart to embrace the lethal values of the 1960s. The love of his life, wonderfully played by Robin Wright Penn, chooses a different path; she becomes a drug-addled hippie, with disastrous results."

James Burton, professor at Salisbury University said that conservatives claimed Forrest Gump as their own due less to the content of the film and more to the historical and cultural context of 1994. Burton said that the film's content and advertising campaign were affected by the cultural climate of the 1990s, which emphasized family values and American values, epitomized in the book Hollywood vs. America. He said that this climate influenced the apolitical nature of the film, which allowed many different political interpretations.

Some commentators see the conservative readings of Forrest Gump as indicating the death of irony in American culture. Vivian Sobchack said that the film's humor and irony rely on the assumption of the audience's historical knowledge.

== Soundtrack ==
The soundtrack, featuring 32 songs from the film, was released on July 6, 1994. With the exception of a lengthy suite of themes from Alan Silvestri's original score, all the songs are previously released. Among the artists featured in the film are Elvis Presley, Bob Dylan, Hank Williams, Creedence Clearwater Revival, Aretha Franklin, Lynyrd Skynyrd, Three Dog Night, The Byrds, The Beach Boys, The Jimi Hendrix Experience, The Doors, Canned Heat, Harry Nilsson, The Mamas & the Papas, The Doobie Brothers, Simon & Garfunkel, Bob Seger, Randy Newman, Willie Nelson, Fleetwood Mac, KC & The Sunshine Band, and Buffalo Springfield. Reflecting on compiling the soundtrack, music producer Joel Sill stated "We wanted to have very recognizable material that would pinpoint time periods, yet we didn't want to interfere with what was happening cinematically." The film and the two-disc album have a variety of music from the 1950s to the 1980s performed by American artists. According to Sill, Zemeckis requested this because he thought that American music was the only kind of music Forrest would buy, further stating "All the material in there is American. Bob (Zemeckis) felt strongly about it. He felt that Forrest wouldn't buy anything but American."

The soundtrack reached a peak of number 2 on the Billboard album chart. The soundtrack went on to sell twelve million copies, and is one of the top selling albums in the US. The Oscar-nominated score for the film was composed and conducted by Alan Silvestri and released on August 2, 1994.

== Adaptations ==
=== Novel-sequel ===
The screenplay for the sequel was written by Eric Roth in 2001. It is based on the original novel's sequel, Gump and Co., written by Winston Groom in 1995. Roth's script begins with Forrest sitting on a bench waiting for his son to return from school. After the September 11 attacks, Roth, Zemeckis, and Hanks decided the story was no longer "relevant." In March 2007, however, it was reported Paramount producers took another look at the screenplay.

On the first page of the sequel novel, Forrest Gump tells readers "Don't never let nobody make a movie of your life's story," and "Whether they get it right or wrong, it doesn't matter." The first chapter of the book suggests the real-life events surrounding the film have been incorporated into Forrest's storyline, and that Forrest got a lot of media attention as a result of the film. During the course of the sequel novel, Gump runs into Tom Hanks and at the end of the novel in the film's release, includes Gump going on The David Letterman Show and attending the Academy Awards.

Hanks himself has said that he is glad that a sequel was never made, given the completeness of the original film.

=== Indian remake ===
The Indian film Laal Singh Chaddha, released in August 2022 and starring Aamir Khan and Kareena Kapoor in the title role, is an authorized remake of Forrest Gump, set in India between the late 1970s and the 2010s. The film was directed by Advait Chandan and produced by Aamir Khan Productions, Viacom18 Studios and Paramount Pictures.

== See also ==
- Bubba Gump Shrimp Company, a real American restaurant chain based on the film
- List of American football films
- List of films about the sport of athletics
- List of films with the most Academy Awards per ceremony
- List of best-selling films in the United States
- Forrest Gump (song)
