= Gump and Co. =

1995 novel by Winston Groom

Gump & Co.
- First edition
- Author: Winston Groom
- Language: English
- Publisher: Pocket Books
- Publication date: 1995
- Publication place: United States
- Media type: Print
- Pages: 242
- ISBN: 0-671-52170-5
- Preceded by: Forrest Gump

Gump & Co. (alternatively titled Forrest Gump and Co.) is a 1995 novel by Winston Groom. It is the sequel to his 1986 novel Forrest Gump. It was written to chronicle Forrest's life throughout the 1980s.

== Synopsis ==
On the first page of Gump & Co., Forrest Gump tells readers "Don't ever let nobody make a movie of your life's story," and "Whether they get it right or wrong, it don't matter."

However, the character is not an idiot savant, as in the first book, but more similar to Tom Hanks' "warmhearted dope." The text intentionally contains grammar and spelling mistakes in order to indicate the character's deficient education and cognitive difficulties, albeit less frequently than its predecessor, reflecting that Forrest is a more mature and somewhat more astute man.

The story suggests that the real-life events surrounding the film have affected Forrest's life.

== Plot ==
In 1980, the shrimp market has exploded, and Forrest cannot keep up with the demand. Adding to Forrest's troubles, Lt. Dan sells off his share of the Bubba Gump Shrimp Company and the company eventually goes under. To make ends meet he gets a job as a janitor in a strip club, where he meets a former college football teammate who gets him in a tryout for the New Orleans Saints. Forrest is concerned that he has lost some of his running ability, but does so for the sake of his family. For a time, Forrest pulls the team up in the rankings, but gets cut when he says he cannot make a game due to Jenny's death and her subsequent funeral. Jenny's mother is in poor health and Forrest resolves to earn money to support his son, Forrest Jr., who only recently became aware that Forrest is his actual father.

Again unemployed, Forrest sells phony encyclopedias door-to-door, but this is criticized by Little Forrest, who points out glaring errors. Chancing upon the house of a wealthy woman whose husband is wrapped up in research, Forrest helps create the infamous New Coke, getting him a new job with the conglomerate after he cannot remember the formula. When he is hounded day and night to duplicate the effort, he feigns success, but the gala event to debut the drink turns into a mob when people think it is awful. Forrest flees by train and gets a job on a pig farm, where he convinces the command sergeant major (one of Forrest's confederates from the Vietnam War) of a nearby army base to supply them with garbage to feed the pigs. This becomes a success and leads to an idea to create energy from pig dung, but Forrest fails to check control gauges, ending into a messy disaster. Forrest flees Alabama for Washington, D.C.

Once at Union Station in Washington, Forrest sees a homeless, handicapped man, who says he is Lt. Dan, who had fallen in with those who took advantage of him and absconded with his retirement money, leaving him bankrupt. On top of that, Dan has become half-blind. Forrest, not wishing to see Dan homeless, says they will work something out. Forrest soon meets with a Marine colonel who recruits Forrest into a clandestine mission to Iran. They meet with Ronald Reagan. On the mission itself, he and North meet Ayatollah Khomeini. The mission is discovered, labeled by the press as the Iran–Contra affair, and everyone disavows responsibility save for Forrest, who is jailed.

Some time later, Forrest and the other prisoners are eligible for a work release program, to which they are put to work under a "religious rehabilitation" at Holy Land, along with John Hinckley Jr., where he accidentally exposes Jim Bakker's affair with his secretary.

Forrest then works with Ivan Boesky and Michael Milken on Wall Street, where he and his son meet a young actor there while shooting Big, who makes awkward remarks such as "life is like a box of chocolates", which fails to impress them. After sleeping with his attractive secretary, Forrest is visited by Jenny's ghost, who is worried about Forrest, not on account of the affair but because he has not questioned why he has been getting lots of money to simply sign papers. Sure enough, he is set up to be the fall guy for their schemes, but his trial is disrupted by news of a crash. He's later met by two MPs, who tell him that due to an error in being medically released while in Vietnam, his enlistment has yet to expire and he is back on active duty. He is taken from New York City to a remote post in Alaska, while his son stays behind.

Forrest considers Alaska a nice change of pace from the superficiality of Manhattan, but ends up accidentally wrecking the Exxon Valdez after a drunken night with an old friend. In the environmental hoopla that ensues, the Army spirits Forrest out of the States and decides to quiet his involvement, as court-martialing a Medal of Honor recipient would look bad. Forrest is then assigned to the reputed worst job in the Army: cleaning mud off tank treads in West Germany.

Forrest also meets an attractive blonde woman named Gretchen, who works in a beer hall. Originally from East Germany, Gretchen was spirited to the West, but her family still remains in the Soviet zone. Forrest and Gretchen start dating, but when Forrest suggests buying Little Forrest an oompah horn, Gretchen thinks he cannot afford such a gift on a private's salary and suggests better rapport could be built through writing letters explaining his situation in Germany.

When Forrest's background in pro football is discovered, he gets recruited for the unit's football team. During a game, Forrest punts the ball, which flies over the Berlin Wall, causing another turn of events where people in both East and West Berlin start breaking the wall with sledgehammers.

Forrest is deployed for the Gulf War, where he is reunited with Lt. Dan(whose family ain't missed a [U.S.] war in nine generations). His tank crew captures Saddam Hussein. Norman Schwarzkopf is shocked at this, while privately praising such initiative, he remarks they got all of them in trouble with President George H. W. Bush as it was not in the orders to get Saddam, and orders Saddam returned. They do so, taking Saddam to the outskirts of Baghdad. However, right afterwards they are hit by friendly fire. Forrest flees to safety, but not Lt. Dan, who says his time has come like all his ancestors who died in an American war.

Forrest starts harvesting oysters and builds it into a very successful business with the help of Forrest Jr. and all his old contacts. When thinking about investing the proceeds, he meets Bill and Hillary Clinton at Whitewater. The final chapter deals with Forrest arguing with Forrest Jr., who has taken up to adolescent rebellion by clandestinely drinking beer, and Forrest Sr. laying down the law in an old-fashioned way (although Junior does talk Forrest out of getting involved with Whitewater). Forrest gets one final visit from Jenny saying that he has set their son straight and that she "likes that German girl", implying that she is ready to cross over to Heaven. Forrest marries Gretchen, and his story gets put into film, winning Best Picture. The novel ends as a laugh riot ensues when Forrest is invited to speak onstage and accidentally spouts a silly line from the film.

== Cancelled film adaptation ==
A Gump & Co. film was in the works at one point, due to the success of the first book and film. Screenwriter Eric Roth submitted a script for the sequel on September 10, 2001, but after the September 11 attacks the next day, there was a sense that "the world had changed" and that the plot of Gump & Co. was no longer relevant. The project ended up languishing in development hell.

In 2007, Paramount and producers Steve Tisch and Wendy Finerman took another look at the project, but nothing came of it.

In 2022, Tom Hanks said that a second film was never seriously considered, noting discussions "lasted all of 40 minutes." He expressed gratitude that he was never contractually-obligated to do another film, stating, "I've always said, 'Guys, if there's a reason to do it, let's do it. But you guys can't force me.' There is that natural inclination that is one of pure commerce that says, 'Hey, you just had a hit, so do it again and you'll have a hit.'"

== Reception ==
The publisher, Simon & Schuster, cite a number of positive reviews, including Patricia Holt, in the San Francisco Chronicle, saying it "is a delight". However, The New York Times review called the book's humor "tiresome and banal".
