= St. Paul's Episcopal School =

Coordinates: 30.69647°N 88.13410°W

Location
- 161 Dogwood Lane; Mobile, Alabama 36608; United States

Information
- Type: Private
- Motto: Sword of the Spirit (Latin: Spiritus Gladius)
- Denomination: Episcopal
- Founded: 1947
- CEEB code: 011833
- NCES School ID: 00000758
- President: E. Luckett Robinson II
- Director: Dan Drum (Assistant Head of School); Tyler Kerns (Dean of Students); Lisa McDonough (Upper School); Austen Johnson (Middle School); Katie Cotton (Intermediate School); Sarah Gross(Lower School)
- Head of school: Dr. Scott McDonald
- Faculty: 204 (including staff)
- Grades: PreK-12
- Gender: Coeducational
- Enrollment: approx. 1,199 (K-12)
- Classrooms: 85
- Campus size: 32 acres
- Colors: Red and Blue
- Fight song: When the Saints Go Marching In
- Athletics: Yes
- Athletics conference: AHSAA - 6A
- Mascot: The Saint
- Nickname: Saints
- Rival: UMS-Wright Preparatory School, Spanish Fort High School
- Accreditation: Southern Association of Independent Schools; Southern Association of Colleges and Schools
- Publication: The Epistle
- Yearbook: The Halo
- Endowment: $1,831,803
- Information: 251-342-6700
- Website: stpaulsmobile.net

St. Paul's Episcopal School is an independent, parochial, co-educational Christian preparatory school in Mobile, Alabama.

== Description ==
The school has a four-level structure: the Lower School (Pre-K through 2nd grade), the Intermediate School (3rd grade and 4th grade), the Middle School (5th grade through 8th grade), and the Upper School (9th grade through 12th grade).

The main campus houses the Intermediate School, Middle School, and Upper School grade-levels. The main building, off Dogwood Lane, can be found on "The Horseshoe." "The Horseshoe" is a looping driveway that surrounds Saints' Square, a memorial-square and common meeting place on the school's campus. Also located on the main campus are buildings containing 85 classrooms, auxiliary buildings, two gymnasiums, a football field and track, a baseball field, a softball field, multiple practice fields, and a cafeteria.

The Lower School campus is separate from the school's main campus and can be found 0.4 miles down Old Shell Road at the same location as the church associated with the school.

== Athletics ==
St. Paul's has won a total of 202 Alabama state championships in 18 sports, including: baseball, girls' basketball, girls' cross-country, boys' cross-country, football, boys' golf, girls' golf, girls' indoor track, boys' indoor track, girls' soccer, girls' swimming and diving, boys' swimming and diving, girls' tennis, boys' tennis, girls' outdoor track, boys' outdoor track, volleyball, and girls' heptathlon.

St. Paul's also has a long-standing athletic rivalry with UMS-Wright, another local private high school that is just 2.2 miles away down Old Shell Road. In football, the two teams meet every year in the "Battle of Old Shell Road."

St. Paul's has been coined as being a "Pathway to the Pros" by regional news media in recent years referring to the vast number of professional athletes who were local stars appearing first at SPS athletic events.

== Impact Report 2023 ==
According to Ashbee of the St. Paul's Impact Report, In August of 2023 The school began its 75th school year anniversary. This year marked a milestone in the school's history for fundraising and that was recognized through multiple fundraising events. The school also held several events throughout the year, with different activities being held at each event in order to raise money for the school. In October the school hosted its very first "Giving Day" where the school's community raised $85,000 which nearly doubled the original goal. The school held an event in March to thank their donors and sponsors of the "Saints Night Out". This event was "Saints Soiree". In April 2023 the school reached 35 years of the Alternative Instruction Program (A.I.P.). A new Endowment Fund, Excellence in AIP, was created in 20233 by Myrtle and Jermey Milling as a tribute to Helen Muscat Robinson, which is the first fund created to support the program. A new tier was added to the donors list referred to as "The Visionary's Circle". This title is given to those who make a minimum donation of $10,000 to the school. In total the school was able to raise $2,530,295.330 for the 2022-2023 school year. The next year the school was able to raise $2,015,105.44

== All School Writing Day ==
According to Baker from the St. Paul's Epistle, the school participates in All School Writing Day. Every student from preschool to seniors write a response to a fiction, nonfiction, and poetry prompt. Over1,000 submissions were initially made. This writing day is held the first day back form Christmas break, January 3rd. Through an anonymous grading system 5 semifinalist are chosen from each class. These semifinalists meet with students from the journalism class for guidance on their revisions. The semifinalists then revise their work in their own time and resubmit their pieces. From this submission 1 winner from each class is selected. This process allows students to work on their writing and gives other students an opportunity to practice peer revisions.

== Traditions ==
According to the St. Paul's Epistle, the school hosts "Saints Run". On March 19, 2023, the most participants in history completed the run. The ages ranged from 4 to 73. Proceeds from Saint's Run go to the Chad Saucier Memorial Scholarship Fund. This scholarship is in memory of Chad Saucier, class of 1993, who lost his life in a hazing incident during his freshman year of college. This scholarship is given to a student who has respect, responsibility, integrity, service, and tolerance.Another event hosted by the school is "Saint's Night Out". In 2023 "Saint's Night Out" celebrated 75 years of St. Paul's. This event was held at the local Country Club of Mobile. The celebration included food stations, passed appetizers, specialty cocktails, a mini bar, and bourbon tasting. The Blow House Brass band performed.This night made $175,000 in proceeds to go towards the school. This event was another opportunity for the school's community to come together and support the school's fundraising efforts.

== Notable alumni ==
- Mark Barron (2008), Strong Safety for the Los Angeles Rams, drafted by Tampa Bay with the 7th overall pick in 2012 NFL draft
- Chris Bracy (2023), college football safety for the Michigan Wolverines
- Jacob Coker (2011), former quarterback for the Alabama Crimson Tide and the Florida State University Seminoles.
- Blaine Crim, (2015), MLB first baseman for the Texas Rangers
- A. J. Finley (2019), NFL safety for the Los Angeles Chargers
- Walker Hayes (1998), singer/songwriter
- Destin Hood (2008), Professional baseball player for the Miami Marlins
- Bryce Huff (2016), NFL defensive end for the Philadelphia Eagles
- Chevis Jackson (2004), Former defensive back for the Atlanta Falcons (2008 to 2009) and the Jacksonville Jaguars (2010) of the National Football League.
- Tiger Jones (2000), wide receiver for the Philadelphia Soul
- A. J. McCarron (2009), Quarterback for the Cincinnati Bengals, Former National Championship Winning Quarterback for the Alabama Crimson Tide
- Kyle McPherson (2004), Starting pitcher for the Pittsburgh Pirates
- Jake Peavy (1999), 2007 NL Cy Young Award Winner, two-time MLB All-Star starting pitcher for the San Francisco Giants
- Zack Sucher (2005), professional golfer on PGA Tour
