= E24 (TV channel) =

Indian Hindi Music and News channel

- Country: India
- Network: BAG Films & Media Limited
- Headquarters: New Delhi, Delhi, India

Programming
- Picture format: 576i SDTV; 480i SDTV

Ownership
- Owner: BAG Films
- Sister channels: News 24; Darshan 24

History
- Launched: 28 March 2008

Links
- Website: Official Website

Availability

Terrestrial
- Oqaab (Afghanistan): Channel 14

E24 (or commonly E24 Bollywood) is an Indian cable television and satellite network, owned by BAG Films & Media Limited. It was started in March 2008.

== Programming ==
- Waz De Kahan Hai
- Its Controversial
- Dil Se Dil tak
- Golden Era
- U Me Aur TV
- Bheja Fry
- Bollywood Dhamaal
- Bollywood Reporter
- Bollywood Tambola
- Bollywood 20 20
- Bollywood Ka Super Train
- Chatty With Katty
- Confessions
- Dance 10
- E-Special
- E24 Review Show
- Fresh Maal
- Gold Safe
- Hit List
- Hitz Start
- Love Byte
- Star Shake
- E24 Cinema
