= Winston Groom =

American writer (1943–2020)

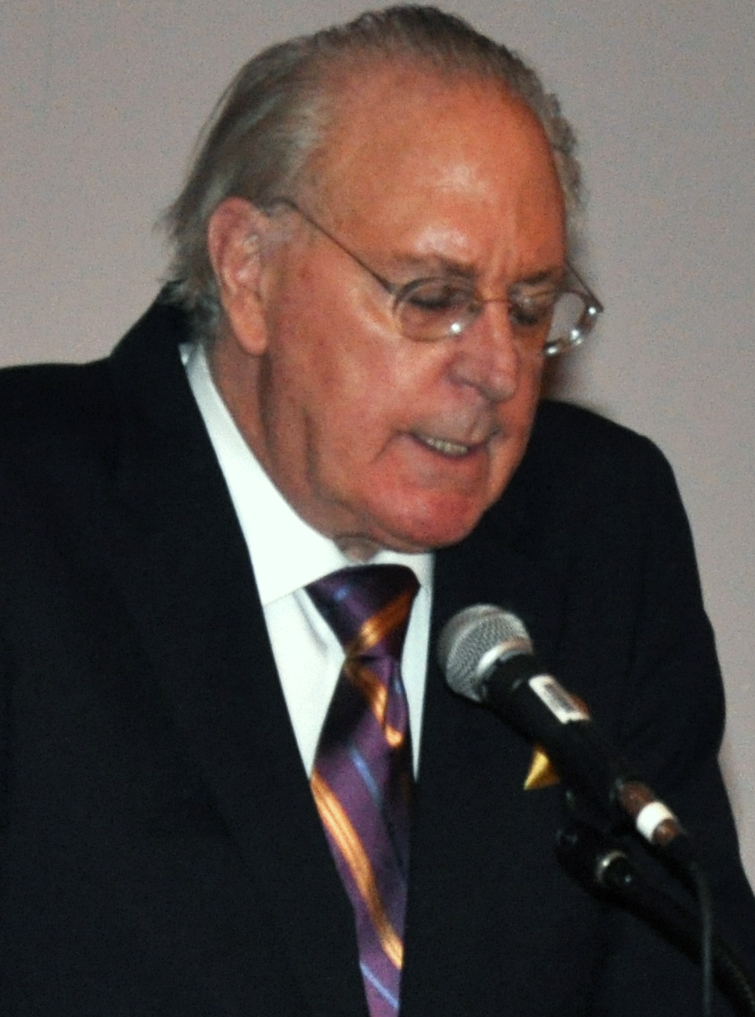
- Groom in 2014
- Born: Winston Francis Groom Jr. March 23, 1943; Washington, D.C., U.S.
- Died: September 17, 2020 (aged 77); Fairhope, Alabama, U.S.
- Education: UMS-Wright Preparatory School; University of Alabama
- Occupation: Author
- Children: Carolina Groom
- Writing career
- Notable work: Forrest Gump

Winston Francis Groom Jr. (March 23, 1943 – September 17, 2020) was an American author. He is best known for his best-selling novel Forrest Gump (1986), which became a 1990s cultural phenomenon after being adapted as the film of the same name directed by Robert Zemeckis and starring Tom Hanks. After the film was released, gaining a high box office and winning numerous awards, Groom's novel sold more than one million copies worldwide. Groom wrote a sequel, Gump & Co., published in 1995. His last novel was El Paso (2016).

Groom wrote a total of fifteen nonfiction works on such varied subjects as the American Civil War and World War I, including five biographies.

== Early life and education ==
Winston Francis Groom Jr. was born in Washington, D.C., the son of Ruth (Knudsen), an English teacher, and Winston Francis Groom Sr., a lawyer at the Pentagon. His family returned to Mobile, Alabama, where the senior Groom practiced law.

Groom was raised in Mobile County, Alabama, where he attended the private University Military School (now known as UMS-Wright Preparatory School). His earliest ambition was to become a lawyer like his father. Groom attended the University of Alabama, where he became a member of Delta Tau Delta International Fraternity and the Army ROTC. While serving as a literary editor in college, he settled on a new ambition: to become a writer. He graduated with Omicron Delta Kappa honors in 1965.

Groom served in the U.S. Army from 1965 to 1967, including a tour of duty in the Vietnam War (from 1966 to 1967). Most of his service time was spent with the Fourth Infantry Division.

== Career ==
Upon his return from Vietnam, Groom worked as a reporter for the Washington Star, a Washington, D.C. newspaper, covering the Department of Justice and the federal courts. Groom resigned and moved to New York to pursue a career in writing novels.

Groom's first novel was Better Times Than These, published in 1978. The book was about a rifle company in the Vietnam War whose patriotism and lives are shattered. According to P. J. O'Rourke, a journalist and political satirist, and a friend of Groom, Better Times Than These was "the best novel written about the Vietnam War."

His next novel As Summers Die (1980) received better recognition. His book Conversations with the Enemy (1982) follows an American soldier who escapes from a POW camp in Vietnam and returns to the United States. Fourteen years later he is arrested for desertion. Conversations with the Enemy was a 1984 finalist for the Pulitzer Prize for General Nonfiction.

In 1985, Groom moved back to Mobile, Alabama, where he began to work on the novel Forrest Gump. Years before, Groom's elderly father had told him about a mentally disabled boy he had known as a child. Groom wrote the novel in six weeks; it was published in 1986. Several years later, it was adapted by screenwriter Eric Roth as a 1994 film of the same name, starring Tom Hanks in the title role of Forrest Gump. The film received six Academy Awards and numerous others; its popularity propelled the novel to best-seller status, and it sold 1.7 million copies worldwide.

Groom was paid $350,000 for the movie rights to the book, but disputed accounting by Paramount Pictures related to profits from the film. He contended the company used Hollywood accounting methods to deflate profitability numbers; as a result, Groom received no share of the profits, although he held a three percent net profit share. He eventually settled with Paramount in 1995 in an agreement that included a seven-figure sum for the film rights to Gump and Co., plus a percentage of the gross profits. As of 2025 the film has not been made, and no release date has been announced; the film is said to be in "development hell".

In November 2011, Groom published Kearny's March: The Epic Creation of the American West, 1846–1847, which describes how Brigadier General Stephen W. Kearny's quest for westward adventure coincided with the expansionist desires of U.S. President James K. Polk. The book opens in mid-summer 1846, in the period of the Texas Annexation, the Mexican–American War, and brewing issues related to the American Civil War fifteen years in the future. Groom weaves into Kearny's March mountain man and guide Kit Carson, Brigham Young and his Mormon followers, and members of the Donner Party.

In 2016, Groom published El Paso, his first novel in nearly 20 years.

At the time of his death in 2020, Groom was waiting for publication of The Patriots, his biography of American leaders John Adams, Alexander Hamilton, and Thomas Jefferson.

== Personal life ==
Groom was married three times, and was divorced twice. He had one daughter, and three stepchildren. He died from a suspected heart attack at his home in Fairhope on September 17, 2020, at age 77.

== Works ==
=== Novels ===
- Better Times than These. Simon and Schuster. 1978. ISBN 978-0-671-52266-7.
- As Summers Die, 1980, ISBN 9780671522650.
- With Duncan Spencer. Conversations with the Enemy : The Story of P.F.C. Robert Garwood, Putnam, 1983, ISBN 0399127151
- Only. Simon and Schuster. 1984. ISBN 978-0-671-52267-4.
- Forrest Gump (1986); Knopf Doubleday Publishing Group, reprint 2012, ISBN 9780307947406
- Gone the Sun (1988); 1996, ISBN 9780671535162
- Gump and Co. (1995) ISBN 0671521705 OCLC 32988843
- Such a Pretty, Pretty Girl (1998) ISBN 0375501614
- El Paso (2016) ISBN 978-1631492242

=== Nonfiction ===
External videos
- Booknotes interview with Groom on A Storm in Flanders, September 1, 2002, C-SPAN
- Presentation by Groom on 1942: The Year That Tried Men's Souls, August 2, 2005, C-SPAN
- Presentation by Groom on Vicksburg, 1863, April 15, 2009, C-SPAN
- Presentation by Groom on Kearny's March, November 15, 2011, C-SPAN
- Presentation by Groom on Ronald Reagan: Our 40th President, March 6, 2012, C-SPAN
- Presentation by Groom on The Generals, November 14, 2015, C-SPAN

- Conversations with the Enemy: the story of P.F.C. Robert Garwood (1982, with Duncan Spencer) ISBN 0399127151 OCLC 9044556
- Shrouds of Glory: From Atlanta to Nashville: The Last Great Campaign of the Civil War (1995) ISBN 0871135914 OCLC 31376792
- The Crimson Tide: An Illustrated History of Football at the University of Alabama (2002)
- A Storm in Flanders: The Triumph and Tragedy on the Western Front (2002) ISBN 0871138425 OCLC 49285528
- 1942: The Year that Tried Men's Souls (2004) ISBN 0871138891 OCLC 57342246
- Patriotic Fire: Andrew Jackson and Jean Laffite at the Battle of New Orleans (2006) ISBN 1400044367 OCLC 60671930
- Vicksburg, 1863. Knopf Doubleday Publishing Group. April 2010. ISBN 978-0-307-27677-3. OCLC 236339246.
- The Crimson Tide: The Official Illustrated History of Alabama Football, National Championship Edition (2010)
- Kearny's March: The Epic Creation of the American West, 1846-1847 (2011) ISBN 0307270963 OCLC 701810360
- Ronald Reagan: Our 40th President (2012)
- Shiloh, 1862. National Geographic Society. 20 March 2012. ISBN 978-1-4262-0879-9. (2012), OCLC 774404320
- The Aviators: Eddie Rickenbacker, Jimmy Doolittle, Charles Lindbergh, and the Epic Age of Flight (2013) ISBN 1426211562
- The Generals: Patton, MacArthur, Marshall, and the Winning of World War II (2015) ISBN 1426215495
- The Allies: Roosevelt, Churchill, Stalin, and the Unlikely Alliance That Won World War II (2018)
- The Patriots: Alexander Hamilton, Thomas Jefferson, John Adams, and the Making of America (2020), published posthumously.

== See also ==
- List of people with surname Groom
