= News24 (Indian TV channel) =

24-hour Hindi news television channel

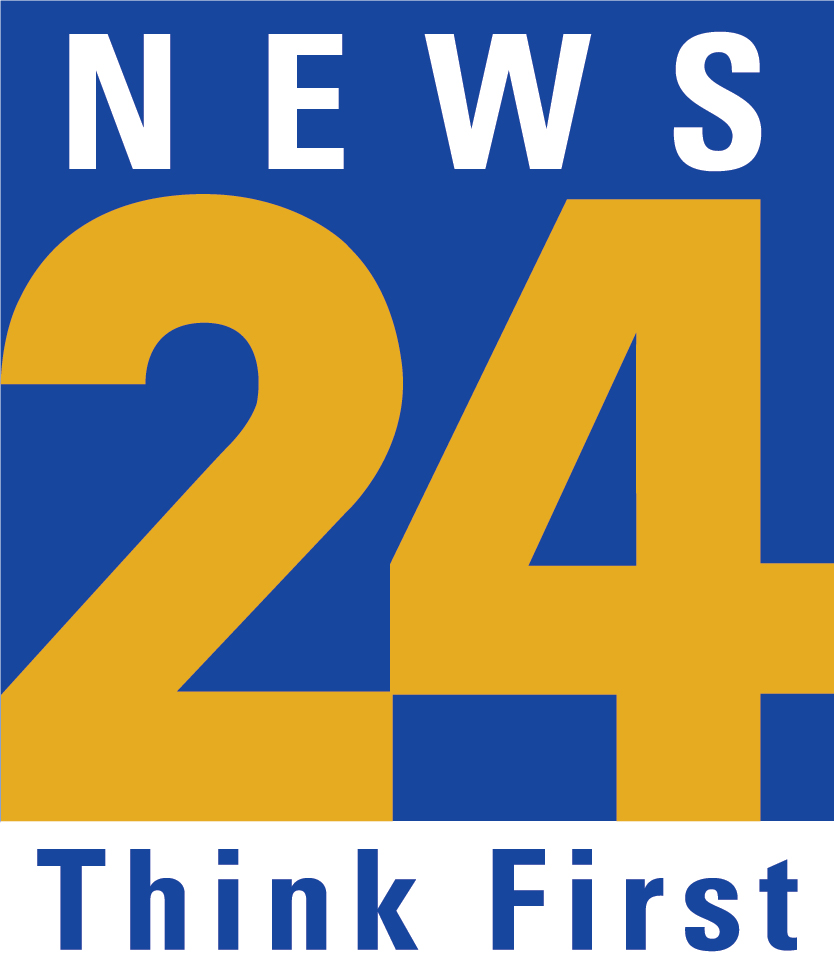
- News 24 logo
- Country: India
- Headquarters: Noida, Uttar Pradesh, India

Programming
- Language: Hindi
- Picture format: 4:3 (576i, SDTV)

Ownership
- Owner: B.A.G Network
- Sister channels: E24

History
- Launched: 2007 (19 years ago)

Links
- Website: www.news24online.com

News24 is a 24-hour Hindi news television channel owned by B.A.G. Films and Media Limited. It has been launched in 2007 and it is free-to-air channel in India. News 24 changed its logo with a new design.

Promoted by Anurradha Prasad, sister of former Union Minister Ravi Shankar Prasad, along with her husband, Indian National Congress politician Rajeev Shukla. Anuradha Prasad is the chairperson and managing director of B.A.G. Films and Media Limited. B.A.G. Films and Media was founded on 22 January 1993.

News 24 is a media conglomerate with diversified interests in production, television broadcasting, radio, new media ventures and education.

== TV shows ==
- Sabse Bada Sawal
- Rashtra Ki Baat
- Mahaul Kya Hai?
- Kalchakra
