= Forrest Gump (novel) =

1986 novel by Winston Groom

- First edition
- Author: Winston Groom
- Cover artist: Bill Creevy
- Language: English
- Publisher: Doubleday
- Publication date: 1986
- Publication place: United States
- Media type: Print
- Pages: 228
- ISBN: 0-385-23134-2
- Followed by: Gump & Co.

Forrest Gump is a 1986 novel by Winston Groom. The title character retells adventures ranging from shrimp boating and ping pong championships, to thinking about his childhood love, as he bumbles his way through American history, with everything from the Vietnam War to college football becoming part of the story.

Gump is portrayed as viewing the world simply and truthfully. He does not know what he wants to do in life, but despite his low IQ, he is made out to be full of wisdom. He says that he "can think things pretty good", but when he tries "sayin or writin them, it kinda come out like Jello". His mathematical abilities as a savant and feats of strength lead him into all kinds of adventures. Groom was inspired by both a 60 Minutes segment on savants, and hearing his father recall a slow-witted childhood neighbor in Alabama: he thought such a character made for a good protagonist, quickly writing an opening chapter before completing a novel in six weeks. The character's surname was taken from the Gump's store.

The novel was adapted as a film of the same name which was released in 1994 by Paramount Pictures. Forrest was played by Tom Hanks and the movie won six Academy Awards, including Best Picture, and numerous other awards.

A sequel novel, Gump & Co., was written by Groom and published in 1995.

== Plot ==
Forrest Gump, named after Confederate cavalry officer and Ku Klux Klan Grand Wizard Nathan Bedford Forrest, narrates the story of his life. The author uses misspellings and grammatical errors to indicate the character's Southern accent, education, and cognitive disabilities. While living in Mobile, Alabama, Forrest meets Jenny Curran in first grade and walks her home. They become the best of friends.

By the time Forrest is 16 years old, he is 6 feet 6 inches (1.98 m) tall, weighs 242 pounds (110 kg), and plays high school football. Miss Henderson, with whom Forrest is infatuated, gives him reading lessons. He reads Mark Twain's The Adventures of Tom Sawyer and two other books that he does not remember. While he enjoys the books, he does not do well on tests.

He gains popularity as a football player, making the All-State team. When Forrest is called to the principal's office, he meets noted university coach Bear Bryant, who asks if he'd considered playing college football. After high school, Forrest takes a test at a local army recruitment center and is told he is "Temporarily Deferred."

Forrest and Jenny meet again at the University of Alabama and play together in a folk music band at the student union, covering songs by such singers as Joan Baez, Bob Dylan, and Peter, Paul and Mary. After one semester, Forrest flunks out of the university. He and his friend Bubba are drafted into the Army, but Bubba dies in the Vietnam War. Forrest is wounded and meets Lieutenant Dan, who has lost his legs, in the infirmary. Dan tells Forrest that he feels Forrest is destined for something great.

While recuperating, Forrest develops a talent for ping pong, eventually playing in a tournament in China and inadvertently saving the life of Mao Tse-tung and meeting President Lyndon Johnson. He reconnects with Jenny and is arrested and institutionalized after a peace demonstration. When the doctors realize he has a talent for doing math in his head, he is recruited to be an astronaut for NASA. When "Sue", a male orangutan on the flight, wrecks the ship, they crash land in New Guinea and end up captives of a tribe of cannibals, whose chief teaches Forrest to play chess. After returning to the US, Forrest meets President Richard Nixon and runs into Dan, who is now homeless. They travel to Indianapolis to look for Jenny and find her working in a tire plant. Forrest begins working as a professional wrestler, fighting as "The Dunce". When Dan hatches a plan to rip off Forrest's manager, Jenny leaves in disgust. Forrest, who dreams of starting a shrimp business like his friend Bubba wanted to, decides to head for Bayou La Batre. Before he can go, he meets a chess champion who realizes his talents and enters him into a competition. This doesn't pan out, nor does working alongside Raquel Welch in a remake of The Creature From the Black Lagoon.

Forrest and Sue eventually make it to Bubba's hometown, and with advice from Bubba's father, start a shrimping operation. This becomes so successful that he becomes a millionaire and hires most of the people he'd previously encountered to work for him. He is roped into running for the U.S. Senate, but is forced to drop out when the media uncovers his checkered past. Eventually, he and Sue move to Savannah, Georgia, where Forrest performs as a one-man band. He finds Dan again and runs into Jenny, who has a son, whom she reveals to be Forrest's. Forrest decides not to be present in his son's life, as Jenny is now married. He, Sue, and Dan move to New Orleans.

== Critical reception ==
In a 1986 book review by Kirkus Reviews, the anonymous reviewer described the book as a "stumbling, droopy-drawered attempt at a picaresque novel". The conclusion was "A heavy-handed, one-joke sort of novel which is, finally, a cheat". Publishers Weekly recognized the "on-target humor here", but said that the author "has written better books than this".

The novel initially sold an estimated 30,000 copies. After the 1994 film adaptation was released, starring Tom Hanks, the novel sold over a million copies.

== Film adaptations ==
The novel was adapted as a feature-length film of the same name by Paramount Pictures, starring Tom Hanks, and was released in 1994. It won six Academy Awards, including Best Picture and Best Actor for Hanks, in addition to numerous awards by various other film groups.

The screenplay differs from the book in some elements. It does not identify Forrest as a person with savant syndrome. It sanitizes his sex life and reduces profanity as expressed by Forrest in the book. According to author Winston Groom, the movie "took some of the rough edges off" Forrest. He had envisioned the character being played by actor John Goodman. In addition, the movie does not include Gump's time with NASA nor other careers such as professional wrestling. It dropped his time with the cannibals and the ape named Sue. The movie uses special effects and historic footage to have the characters appear to interact with historical figures.

In 2019 an Indian film, Laal Singh Chaddha, starring Aamir Khan, was announced as an adaptation of Forrest Gump. Due to the COVID-19 pandemic its release was delayed a few times, until August 11, 2022.
