= Evelyn Grubb =

American nonprofit organization executive

Evelyn Fowler Grubb (August 9, 1931 – December 28, 2005) was the wife of an American Vietnam War Air Force pilot who became a prisoner of war, she was also a co-founder and then later served as the national coordinator of the National League of Families, a nonprofit organization that worked on behalf of Vietnam-era Missing in Action (MIA) and Prisoner of War (POW) Families. Grubb also oversaw the creation of the famous "You Are Not Forgotten" POW/MIA flag that still flies in front of all U.S. Post Offices, many firehouses and police stations, all major U.S. Military installations as well as most veterans organization chapters in the United States.

During the Vietnam war Grubb served as the League's liaison to the White House, the United Nations and the Paris Peace Talks.

Grubb was also the co-author, along with Carol Jose, of the book You Are Not Forgotten: A Family’s Quest for Truth and The Founding of the National League of Families about her personal struggle as the wife of a prisoner of war, and about her experiences helping to found the National League of Families.

== Early life ==
Grubb was born in Pittsburgh and graduated from Pennsylvania State University. She received a master's degree in education from Penn State in 1954. Her husband was serving in Vietnam, and was then captured while she was living in Virginia.

== Founding of the National League of Families ==
Evelyn Grubb was living in the Petersburg, Virginia area as an Air Force wife when her husband, Major Wilmer Newlin Grubb, was shot down over North Vietnam and became a prisoner of war (POW) in 1966, and after frustrations with the U.S. government withholding information on the status of her husband and other POW and MIA soldiers and pilots, as well as the Pentagon's practice of pressuring affected families not to speak publicly about the status of their captured or missing loved ones, Evelyn Grubb co-founded the National League of Families with Air Force POW wife Mary Crowe, also living in Hampton at the time, and with Sybil Stockdale, a Navy pilot's wife living in Coronado, California, whose husband was also a POW.

Another major impetus for starting the organization was that Grubb's combat casualty benefits, as well as those of many other POW and MIA wives, were delayed due to a Pentagon policy of waiting to confirm that U.S. soldiers and pilots who had become POWs or MIAs were not deserters, which was causing POW and MIA families great financial hardship at the time. At the time that her benefits were being withheld, Grubb had four children, including a newborn child. Grubb was later instrumental in reversing this policy.

The Leagues purpose from the beginning was to bring pressure to bear on all governments involved in the conflict in order to improve treatment of POWs, and their families, and to bring resolution to the status of many missing in action (MIA) soldiers and pilots. The League continues to this day in this work.

After years of Evelyn Grubb's work on behalf of Vietnam POW and MIA families, the Government of North Vietnam announced that her husband had died years earlier in captivity, a fact that they had knowingly withheld for eight years. Evelyn Grubb died of breast cancer in 2005.

== POW/MIA flag ==
Grubb oversaw the Leagues development of the "You Are Not Forgotten" POW/MIA flag in the early 1970s.[6][7] The original design for the flag was created by the artist Newt Heisley for Annin Flagmakers after Mary Hoff, wife of MIA Lt. Commander Michael Hoff U.S.N., recognized the need for a symbol for American POW/MIAs.[8] Evelyn Grubb was a driving force in gaining the flags adoption by the military, the U.S. Postal Service and other federal service agencies.[9] Eventually the flag became widely popular and adoption of its use began to spread on its own, as the flag became a national symbol of Vietnam war remembrance.[10] The flag, with the now widely recognized "You Are Not Forgotten, POW/MIA" logo is still flown in front of all U.S. post offices, all major U.S. military installations, and most fire stations, police stations, many state level agencies and also most veterans organizations chapters across the United States today, and is almost always present at most local and national veterans events in the United States.[11] The flag is consequently still visible to millions of Americans on a daily basis.[12]

== Book ==
=== Writing ===
Grubb wrote the book, with co-author Carol Jose, entitled You Are Not Forgotten: A Family’s Quest for Truth and The Founding of the National League of Families. A significant portion of the book was written by them during the three years up to Grubb's death from breast cancer in December 2005, but the book was still unfinished at the time, and Jose promised Grubb that it would be finished. The book was published by Vandemere Press in 2008.

=== Book Award ===
The book won the 2009 Indie Book Award, in the "History" category.

=== Foreword by Former US Secretary of State Henry Kissinger ===
Former US Secretary of State Henry Kissinger, who met with Grubb many times during her tenure as the Leagues National Coordinator, wrote the foreword to the book. In the foreword he emphasizes the importance of learning from some of the difficulties faced by Grubb and other POW and MIA wives of that era:

....It is only through the recording of incidents like the ones you will read about here, in the pages of You Are Not Forgotten, that we can study them, and hopefully learn from that experience.

=== C-Span segment ===
In November 2008, the cable television channel C-SPAN did a special segment on Evelyn Grubb's life and the book, hosting a talk given by the book's co-author Carol Jose.

== Film Adaptation ==
=== "Fruits of Peace" ===
Evelyn Grubb’s story and legacy are further explored in the 2019 documentary film "Fruits of Peace," https://www.imdb.com/title/tt8991758/?ref_=fn_t_1 which chronicles an extraordinary journey of reconciliation between her family and Du Pham, a former North Vietnamese Army officer. Du served in the anti-aircraft unit C4, which shot down U.S. Air Force pilot Wilmer Newlin (Newk) Grubb in 1966. Believing Grubb had survived the war and been released during Operation Homecoming in 1973, Du traveled to the United States in 2010 to search for him, at significant personal cost. The price of a plane ticket was equivalent to a year’s salary in Vietnam, yet Du undertook the journey seeking not only to reconnect with family, but also to make peace with a former enemy he assumed had lived. While searching for Grubb in rural Pennsylvania, Du learned for the first time that Grubb had died in captivity during the war. Guided by his former commanding officer, Du went on to visit Grubb’s grave at Arlington National Cemetery. The film, produced by Napkin Sketch Productions, LLC, https://www.napkinsketchproductions.com/fruitsofpeace, Directed by Kevyn Settle, documents this deeply human encounter and examines themes central to Grubb’s legacy, including the duty to remember, and the possibility of reconciliation across generations shaped by war.

== See also ==
- Vietnam War POW/MIA issue
- Vietnam War
