= League of Wives =

The League of Wives
- The League of Wives of American Vietnam Prisoners of War
- Carole Hansen, Louise Mulligan, Sybil Stockdale, Andrea Rander, Mary Ann Mearns, and President Richard Nixon, December 1969. Virginia Museum of History and Culture.
- Formation: April 1966
- Founder: Sybil Stockdale
- Founded at: San Diego, California, US
- Key people: Louise Mulligan; Iris Powers; Barbara Keenan

The League of Wives of American Vietnam Prisoners of War was an organization founded in 1967 initially intended for sharing information and support among the wives of POW and MIA soldiers during the Vietnam War. The league was founded by Sybil Stockdale, the wife of detained American soldier James (Jim) Stockdale. Although its initial aim of the league was to provide support for its members, the league's wives were inspired to take action to ensure the safe return of POW and MIA Americans in Vietnam after being left discontented by the US military when it could not effectively provide families with the statuses or conditions of their relatives. The letters sent and meetings held by the league with military officials throughout the latter half of the Vietnam War attracted some animosity and significant media attention.

== Origins ==
The League of Wives was established in April 1966. Initially inspired by a letter she received from her husband while detained in Vietnam, Sybil Stockdale pursued answers from military officers by meeting with various key officials across the United States.

The league's initial goals were not political; Stockdale's initial intention in connecting with other wives whose husbands were also POWs was to address her own concerns about the influence of communist propaganda on American perceptions of the war. She hoped that this larger network, which demonstrated that others shared her concerns, would lend legitimacy to her cause. In its initial form, the group was both a social and support space for women in the surrounding area to connect with one another, with some describing it as a "sorority". There was also a further element of support through mentorship offered by the older wives to the younger ones, as Stockdale felt obligated to guide the younger wives who were now possibly widow.

This environment was helpful to women who found themselves isolated from their former military identity after the loss of their husbands; military spaces were unfriendly to women as they had lost their shared connection to the group. As well, male officials worried that the presence of these women would cause unnecessary fear and stress for other military wives in social spaces, as they were seen as a physical reminder of the costs of the Vietnam War; they therefore actively tried to keep the wives out of these spaces.

In the late 1960s, the newly-formed League of Wives provided a space for women to build identities that were not centered on their wifehood. As Stockdale continued to connect with other women who had experienced loss without official answers, the league's membership and presence continued to grow domestically. With the help of the league's social support, the Wives began leaning on their "feminine qualities" to push their agenda in predominantly male military spaces. They were able to complement these efforts and apply additional pressure on military officials by publicizing the conditions and treatment their husbands described in letters. These tactics, along with continuous development of social networks and increased media coverage allowed the league to develop into a more formally structured organization. By the 1970s, Stockdale and other league wives had created a vast network of women across the country searching for answers about their husbands, leading to the development of a "truly national organization" for the first time.

Many wives who joined in the league faced demilitarization and the tarnishing of their husbands' ranks. However, the majority of members believed the league's cause to be worth the loss of reputation.

== Notable members ==
Sybil Stockdale's husband, Jim Stockdale, was shot down in North Vietnam in 1965. She then received a letter from her husband, who had become a POW, in April 1966 and asked for his status to be changed from MIA to POW. After receiving the letter from her husband, Stockdale began organizing meetings between the wives. Her original efforts were based in San Diego.

Barbara Keenan sought help from the American military when her husband disappeared and they suggested that she receive medical care, then treated her with tranquilizers. In 1968, Keenan had become impatient from waiting and keeping silent, and she turned to political activism. She engaged in volunteer work for the league and attended their social events. She later became the head of a more radical group of activists, "Families for Intermediate Release" (FIR). In 1971, the FIR publicly criticized the League of Wives for failing to reach its humanitarian goals and adopted an antiwar position, violating several conditions of involvement in the league.

Louise Mulligan was given the job of coordinator in the league by Sybil Stockdale. Mulligan oversaw the curating of the league's newsletter, which was distributed to other POWs' families through the Department of Defense.

Iris Powers was the mother of a missing US Army non-commissioned officer and became a member of the league in the later stages of its formation. She eventually served as the league's first national coordinator. Her efforts broadened the league's scope of consideration to include South Vietnam Army personnel. She personally visited 700 US Army enlistees' families and compiled a list of significant reforms for US Army policy, which were eventually accepted and implemented.

== Campaigns ==
=== Letters to the government ===
Letter-writing campaigns were consistently used to promote the league's mission since before its official establishment and remained a central strategy of the league. Members of the league began sending letters appealing to the government individually starting in 1965. The lack of response largely inspired the formation of the organization.

The first letter sent as the League of Wives was addressed to Washington and requested a meeting with a representative of the Department of State to address their concerns. Three weeks after this letter was sent, Ambassador Harriman's assistant met with the wives in San Diego.

Letter-writing campaigns were launched to appeal not only to the US government but also to a number of leaders around the globe, as well as international organizations to raise awareness and receive aid and information. The league also reached out to international media outlets to spread the news. Articles on the Vietnam War POW/MIA issue and the league's efforts to remedy it were published in Berlin, Cairo, and other regions around the world.

=== Telegraph-in ===
The league's most notorious letter-writing campaign was the "telegraph-in" on January 20, 1969. Inspired by antiwar stand-in and sit-in protesting tactics, Stockdale called on POW/MIA wives to write as many telegrams as possible to the Nixon administration on Inauguration Day. The day after inauguration, Nixon was met with over 2,000 telegrams urging him to make the humane treatment of POW/MIA in Vietnam a priority for his administration. According to Nixon's Special Assistant Alexander Butterfield, this campaign had a significant effect on the President's stance on the Vietnam War POW/MIA issue. This was reflected in Nixon's first press conference a week after the "telegraph-in" on January 27, 1969. When asked about ending the war in Vietnam, Nixon said they would have to go through negotiations, including the release of prisoners, before that could happen.

=== Government visitations ===
In addition to letter campaigns, members of the league made personal visits to military and state officials in Washington, D.C., and in their hometowns.

Stockdale met with Governor Harriman in August of 1966 to discuss the potential treatment of POWs as war criminals.

League of Wives National coordinator of Minnesota Mary Winn met with the General Chief of Staff of the Air Force and requested a list of POW/MIA families in the country on behalf of the league. Such a list was not permitted for public distribution as it would have violated the families' privacy. A message from the league was instead extended inviting such families to join their cause.

=== Paris appeal, 1969 ===
In 1969, Stockdale and a group of league members travelled to Paris to appeal to the North Vietnamese military without any sponsorship from the US military or the government. On October 4, the group successfully met with North Vietnamese officials to discuss the league's POW/MIA concerns. Later that year in December, a group of 26 wives went to the White House to meet with Nixon. As their influence grew, the league started having bi-monthly meetings with Henry Kissinger.

== Outreach ==
=== Public education, recruitment, and support ===
Before the formation of the league, wives began to break the silence about their husbands' situations by contacting media outlets in hopes that the publicity would help them get answers about their statuses and treatment. One of the first wives to share their story was founder Sybil Stockdale who wrote an article on August 8, 1966, discussing the "legal limbo" under which wives of POW/MIA soldiers had to live, unable to do things as simple as picking up a package at a military base without their husband's signature. In addition to Stockdale, many others shared their stories with the press which helped to not only inform the public of the POW/MIA issue but also inform wives of others in similar situations and facilitate the creation and growth of the league.

The league publicized the POW/MIA issue by urging the public to send letters to the government, Paris Peace talks, international capitols, newspapers, and magazines in order to pressure North Vietnam. They also pushed to remain relevant in the public eye themselves, writing letters, going to talk shows, and sending Christmas cards and postage stamps.

In 1967, league member Shirley Stark convinced her local newspaper to create a section dedicated to counting the days since the first POW capture.

The league maintained a close relationship with a number of different organizations such as the Concerned Citizens of America and the VIVA group. The VIVA group came up with the idea of selling POW/MIA metal bracelets with soldiers' names, ranks and days of capture. These became an important symbol for the league.

=== Criticism ===
As a result of prolonged pressure on the US government and military officials, many critics of the league were concerned about how much sentimentality weighed into the league's decisions. Many believed that the members were extending the war unnecessarily in order to bring their husbands home.

== Accomplishments (1966–1975) ==
=== POW/MIA homecoming ===
In 1973, total of 591 POWs in Vietnam were released and returned to the United States in Operation Homecoming, a plan that was largely influenced by the league's pressure to uphold the Geneva code and ensure POWs' safe return.

=== Military reform ===
The League of Wives used their influence to reach beyond the immediate POW/MIA issue and reform military policy in order to promote and maintain the wellbeing of veterans as well as improve the treatment and benefits for military families.

Many of Iris Powers' recommendations for military reform were implemented into the US military. This included group therapy, the return of the soldiers' personal possessions, and accessible and thorough information for military wives about their husbands' cases.

During the late 1970s, the ban on military women's pregnancy was lifted.

Support and benefits for military families

Aside from public campaigns, the wives provided an important framework for extending a focus on the mental health of soldiers to include their families. The term "service spouse" was amended to include mothers, fathers, and husbands.

The US military increased the range of services provided by Family Support Centers, adding programs to support physical, mental, and emotional health. A rehabilitation program for service personnel coping with addiction was implemented. Families were provided with support groups for stress management and suicidal ideation, as well as couples therapy and assistance for families dealing with domestic violence.

Other changes included the creation of the Survivor Benefit Plan as well as a Veteran's Pension, providing military personnel with a retirement plan that would continue to cover their benefactors in the event of their death.
