= United States Senate Select Committee on POW/MIA Affairs =

Select committee

The Senate Select Committee on POW/MIA Affairs was a special committee convened by the United States Senate during the George H. W. Bush administration (1989 to 1993) to investigate the Vietnam War POW/MIA issue, that is, the fate of United States service personnel listed as missing in action during the Vietnam War. The committee was in existence from August 2, 1991 to January 2, 1993.

== Origins ==
The POW/MIA flag, a common sight in America by the early 1990s and an indicator that the issue had not gone away.

Following the Paris Peace Accords of January 1973, U.S. prisoners of war were returned during Operation Homecoming from February through April 1973.

During the late 1970s and 1980s, the friends and relatives of unaccounted-for American personnel became politically active, requesting the United States government reveal what steps were taken to follow up on intelligence regarding last-known-alive MIAs and POWs. When initial inquiries revealed important information had not been pursued, many families and their supporters asked for the public release of POW/MIA records and called for an investigation. A spate of films, mostly notably Rambo: First Blood Part II (1985), popularized the idea that American POWs had been left behind after the war. Serious charges were leveled at the Bush administration (1989 to 1993) regarding the POW/MIA issue. The United States Department of Defense, headed by then Secretary of Defense Dick Cheney, had been accused of covering up information and failing to properly pursue intelligence about American POW/MIAs. A July 1991 Newsweek cover photograph purported to show three American POWs still being held against their will, which increased general public interest in the issue (but the photograph itself would turn out to be a hoax). Polls showed that a majority of Americans believed that alive POWs were indeed captive; a July 1991 Wall Street Journal poll showed 70 percent of Americans believing this, and that three-fourths of them believed the U.S. government was not doing what needed to be done to gain their release.

Another motivation of the committee became establishing the framework for normalization of relations with Vietnam, and congressional approval of same.

== Members ==
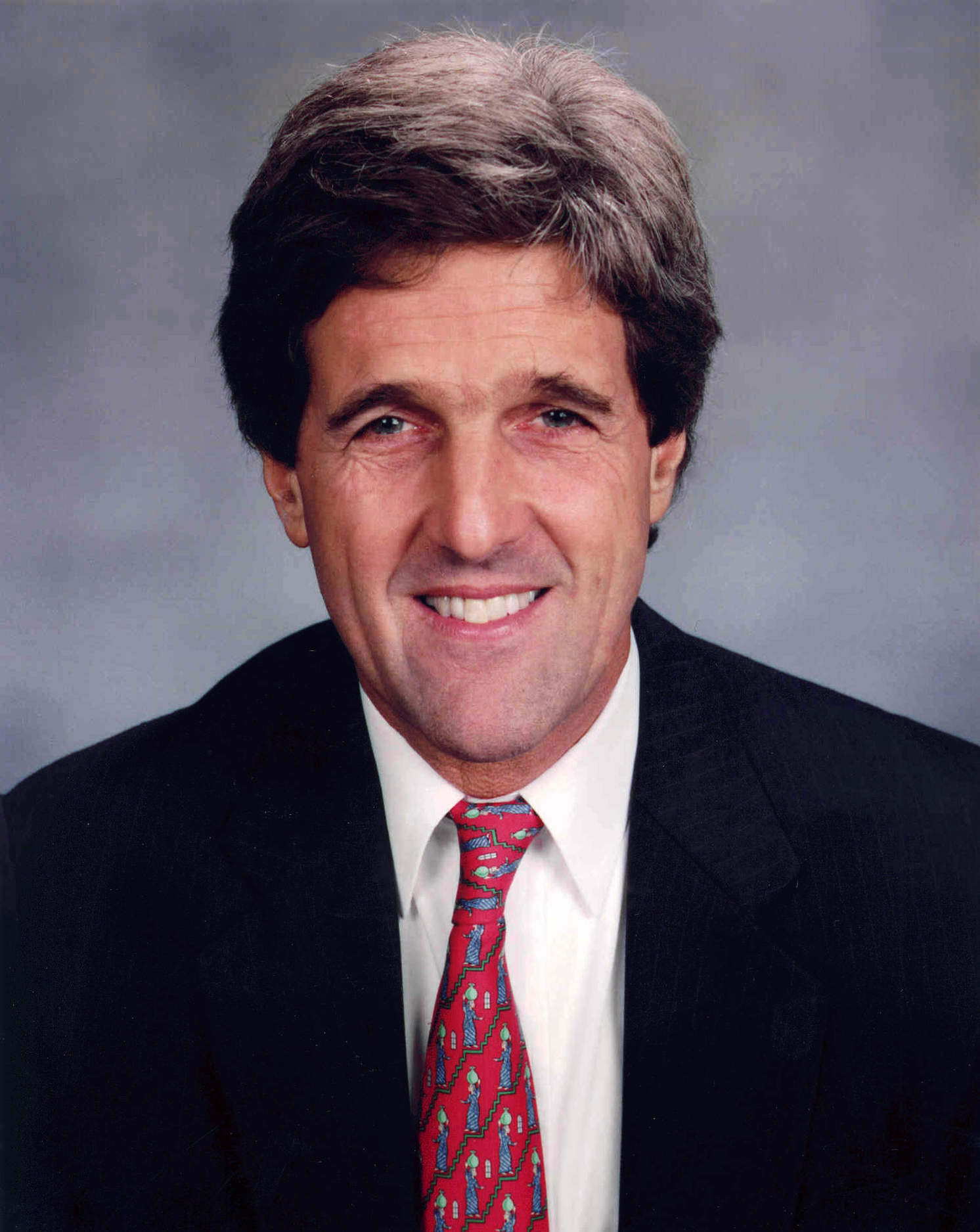
John Kerry, chair of the committee.

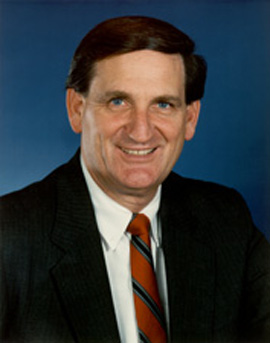
Bob Smith, initiator and vice-chair of the committee.

Shortly thereafter in 1991, Senator and Vietnam veteran Bob Smith introduced a resolution to create a Senate Select POW/MIA Committee. The fate of possible missing or captured Americans in Vietnam had been Smith's major issue since coming to Congress in 1985, partly spurred on by his growing up without knowing how his own father died in World War II. This was the third congressional investigation into the POW/MIA issue, but had a mandate to be more skeptical and ask harder questions of government officials than before. Formation of the committee was passed unanimously by the Senate. By October 1991, ten members had been selected for the committee.

Senator and also Vietnam veteran John Kerry was eventually named chairman of the committee by Senate Majority Leader George Mitchell. Senate Minority Leader Bob Dole chose Smith vice-chairman, after Senator and former Vietnam POW John McCain initially declined the vice-chair position.

The full committee consisted of twelve senators, likewise selected by the majority and minority leaders:

- John Kerry, chairman and Vietnam veteran
- Bob Smith, vice-chairman and Vietnam veteran
- John McCain, seriously wounded Vietnam veteran and POW in North Vietnam
- Bob Kerrey, seriously wounded Vietnam veteran and Medal of Honor recipient
- Chuck Robb, Vietnam veteran
- Hank Brown, Vietnam veteran
- Chuck Grassley
- Nancy Landon Kassebaum
- Herb Kohl
- Tom Daschle
- Harry Reid
- Jesse Helms

Kohl replaced Dennis DeConcini, who was initially selected but then asked to be removed. Al Gore was the only Vietnam-era veteran who declined to participate.

Running the committee was seen as politically risky for Kerry, and one that his advisors recommended he not do. Indeed, as Bob Kerrey later said, "Nobody wanted to be on that damn committee. It was an absolute loser. Everyone knew that the POW stories were fabrications, but no one wanted to offend the vet community."

== Hearings and investigations ==
Hearings began on November 5, 1991, and were conducted in five blocks:

1. Hearings on the U.S. Government's Efforts to Learn the Fate of America's Missing Servicemen (November 1991)
2. Hearings on the U.S. Government's Efforts to Learn the Fate of America's Missing Servicemen (June 1992)
3. Hearings on U.S. Government's Post-War POW/MIA Efforts (August 1992)
4. Hearings on the Paris Peace Accords (September 1992)
5. Hearings on Cold War, Korea, World War II POWs (November 1992)

Going into the hearings, Smith was convinced that prisoners had been left behind after the war. Kerry suspected that some prisoners had been left behind by the Nixon and Ford administrations in their eagerness to disengage from the war; however, he doubted that there were secret camps in operation, as had been touted by POW/MIA activists and some media reports. McCain was skeptical that any prisoners had been left behind, partly because he and the other POWs had gone to great lengths at the time to keep track of everyone who was a prisoner in North Vietnam, and partly because he could see no motivation with evidence behind it for the Hanoi government to have kept any.

The first day of hearings featured the testimony of then-U.S. Secretary of Defense Dick Cheney and retired General, former Chairman of the Joint Chiefs of Staff, and current head of the American POW/MIA delegation in Hanoi, John Vessey. Both defended the administration's and the military's role in trying to get the Vietnamese to improve their efforts in ascertaining the fate of missing personnel. Vessey rejected the notion of a government conspiracy, saying that he had never seen evidence of one at any time in his military career, and adding that, "American soldiers, sailors, airmen and marines are not conspirators." Cheney said that Vietnamese cooperation was improved but still needed much more improvement. The second day featured Garnett "Bill" Bell, head of the U.S. Office for P.O.W.-M.I.A. Affairs in Hanoi, saying that he believed that up to ten American servicemen had been left behind after the war, but that there was no evidence they were still alive. Other Defense Department witnesses testifying that day expressed surprise at Bell's testimony, saying they were unaware of any evidence behind it; their statements were met with hisses from POW/MIA activists and family members in the hearing room. The third day saw the testimony of former Vietnam People's Army Colonel Bui Tin, who had likely observed McCain in prison once and, years later and dissatisfied with the course of post-war Vietnam, had left the country to live in exile in France in 1990. Tin stated that there were no American prisoners alive and that only a few Americans who had switched sides had remained after the war. After his testimony, he and McCain embraced, which produced a flurry of "Former Enemies Embrace"-style headlines.

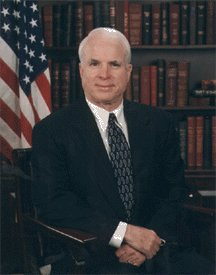
John McCain, the third influential member of the committee.

Thus at times the hearings became heated and contentious. McCain was criticized by some of his fellow POWs for wanting to find a path to normalization. He was also being vilified by some POW/MIA activists as a traitor or a brainwashed "Manchurian Candidate", which the embrace with Tin only exacerbated. Occasionally his famous temper flared during hearings and Kerry had to calm him down, for which McCain later said he was grateful. McCain had an emotionally charged exchange with Dolores Alfond, Chair of the National Alliance Of Families For the Return of America's Missing Servicemen. McCain said he was tired of Alfond denigrating the efforts of himself, Vessey, and others involved in investigating the POW/MIA issue, while a tearful Alfond pleaded for the committee to not shut down its work.

The committee was responsible for getting the Department of Defense to declassify over one million pages of documents. Kerry and McCain and others were able to get the Vietnamese government to give full access to their records. The committee had full-time investigators or delegations stationed in Moscow and other parts of Russia, North Korea, and Southeast Asia. In all, the committee would conduct over 1000 interviews, take over 200 sworn depositions, and hold over 200 hours of public hearings. Some of the hearings were telecast on C-SPAN.

The senators' work was often hands-on. Smith would get leads about possible whereabouts of a POW, and then Kerry would follow up on them. Because of Kerry's activities with Vietnam Veterans Against the War, the North Vietnamese deemed him honorable and opened their facilities to him. There had been persistent reports of U.S. prisoners held under the Ho Chi Minh Mausoleum in Hanoi or in nearby tunnels; Smith had stated in hearings that the Vietnamese Defense Ministry had an underground prison in its compound near the mausoleum, which a Vietnamese official called "a myth and an affront to the people of Vietnam." Kerry and Smith were personally led through a patchwork of tunnels and catacombs under Hanoi, until Smith was satisfied that no Americans were being held there. The number of live-sighting searches, include those on short notice, sometimes led to Vietnamese officials accusing the whole process of being a cloak for espionage.

The question of testimony by businessman and POW/MIA advocate Ross Perot before the committee in June 1992 also led to conflict, with Perot fearing a "circus"-like atmosphere due to his candidacy in the 1992 U.S. presidential election. Perot believed that hundreds of American servicemen were left behind in Southeast Asia at the end of the U.S. involvement in the war, and that government officials were covering up POW/MIA investigations in order to not reveal a drug smuggling operation used to finance a secret war in Laos. But much of any testimony was expected to concern Perot's own actions: committee members wanted to question Perot about his unauthorized back-channel discussions with Vietnamese officials in the late 1980s, which led to fractured relations between Perot and the Reagan and Bush administrations, about Perot's 1990 agreement with Vietnam's Foreign Ministry to become its business agent after relations were normalized, and about Perot's private investigations of and attacks upon Department of Defense official Richard Armitage. The National League of Families of American Prisoners and Missing in Southeast Asia, one of the leading POW/MIA groups, objected to Perot's decision not to testify. McCain urged Perot to testify, saying, "I have heard he is very convinced that there are still numbers of Americans being held against their will in Southeast Asia, and I am very interested in knowing what leads him to hold that view." Perot did finally testify in August 1992, after (temporarily) dropping out of the presidential race. He did not present new evidence of live prisoners, but did denounce U.S. behavior towards Vietnam after the war: "What we have done for 20 years is treat them rudely and punch them around." He also criticized the Central Intelligence Agency for running a secret war in Laos. There were several exchanges between McCain and Perot, who had a complex relationship going back to when Perot had paid for McCain's wife Carol's medical care after she was severely injured in an automobile accident while he was a POW. Perot denied McCain's suggestion that he was a conspiracy theorist, while McCain disputed Perot's notion that the U.S. had "ransomed our prisoners out of Hanoi" at the close of the war.

Some of the most publicized testimony before the committee came in September 1992, when former Nixon Defense Secretaries Melvin Laird and James Schlesinger said that the U.S. government had believed in 1973 that some American servicemen had not been returned from Laos, despite Nixon's public statements to the contrary. Schlesinger said, "As of now, I can come to no other conclusion. [But] that does not mean there are any alive today." Laird said in retrospect of Nixon's assurances that all POWs were coming home, "I think it was unfortunate to be that positive. You can't be that positive when we had the kind of intelligence we had." In reaction to the testimony, Kerry said, "I think it's quite extraordinary when two former secretaries of defense both give evidence documenting that they had information, or they believed personally, that people were alive and not accounted for in Operation Homecoming."

Another conflict occurred over whether Henry Kissinger's testimony was complete regarding what top levels of the Nixon administration knew about POWs at the end of the war. Kerry suggested calling Richard Nixon himself to testify, but after Nixon showed that he was unwilling to do so, Kerry decided not to call Nixon. Kissinger had bristled at the notion of a conspiracy: "There is no excuse, two decades after the fact, for anyone to imply that the last five presidents from both parties, their White House staffs, secretaries of state and defense, and career diplomatic and military services either knowingly or negligently failed to do everything they could to recover and identify all of our prisoners and MIAs." Admiral James Stockdale, a former POW, also rejected the conspiracy claims: "To go into it as a venture, you'd be a fool because there are so many possibilities of leaks and so forth." Former Defense Intelligence Agency director Leonard Peroots testified that a conspiracy would have involved hundreds to thousands of participants from the outset, rapidly growing into the millions with frequent personnel shifts and administration changes over the next twenty years.

Yet another source of conflict were the different factions within the POW/MIA community. The older National League of Families was more established, less radical, and more connected to the government. The newer National Alliance of Families had been created in a schism with the National League during the 1980s, created by members who were dissatisfied with the League's leadership and ties to the government. Compared to the older group, the National Alliance took a more activist, radical stance, especially towards belief in the existence of live prisoners in Southeast Asia.

There were also conflicts among the committee staff, with several of Smith's staff losing their security clearances and roles in the investigation due to documents having leaked to investigative journalists such as Jack Anderson. Among those dismissed by Kerry in July 1992 were former North Carolina Congressman and well-known POW/MIA activist Bill Hendon and deputy staff director Dino Carluccio. (In October 1991, the two had been accused of confronting Bui Tin upon his U.S. arrival at Dulles International Airport and trying to intimidate him against testifying that there were no live prisoners in Vietnam.) After the dismissals, Smith hired both of them back into his Senate office.

== Findings ==
The committee issued its unanimous findings on January 13, 1993. In response to the central question of whether any American POWs were still in captivity, it stated:

While the Committee has some evidence suggesting the possibility a POW may have survived to the present, and while some information remains yet to be investigated, there is, at this time, no compelling evidence that proves that any American remains alive in captivity in Southeast Asia.

With specific regard to the "some evidence", the committee said this:

But neither live-sighting reports nor other sources of intelligence have provided grounds for encouragement,[12] particularly over the past decade. The live-sighting reports that have been resolved have not checked out; alleged pictures of POWs have proven false; purported leads have come up empty; and photographic intelligence has been inconclusive, at best.

Two senators, Smith and Grassley, dissented at note 12, with the report saying "they believe that live-sighting reports and other sources of intelligence are evidence that POWs may have survived to the present."

With regard to the possibility that American POWs survived in Southeast Asia after Operation Homecoming, the committee said this: "We acknowledge that there is no proof that U.S. POWs survived, but neither is there proof that all of those who did not return had died. There is evidence, moreover, that indicates the possibility of survival, at least for a small number, after Operation Homecoming."

== Other wars ==
The committee's charter also involved investigation of POW/MIA issues related to other conflicts, including World War II, the Korean War, and the Cold War.

== Legacy ==
Normalization of relations with Vietnam did not happen right away after the committee concluded. Delay occurred in early 1993 because of Vietnam's refusal to "go the last mile" and the Bush administration's desire to dump the problem on the incoming Clinton administration. Further delays resulted from issues related to Cambodia and avoidance due to the 1994 congressional elections. But in 1995, President Clinton announced normalized diplomatic relations with Vietnam, with McCain and Kerry both very visible as supporters of the decision.

Committee vice-chairman Smith seemed to back away from the committee's findings within months of their being issued, appearing in April 1993 on Larry King Live with POW/MIA activist Bill Hendon, stressing his partial dissent from the majority report and touting new evidence of North Vietnam having held back prisoners in 1973, and then in the Senate in September 1993, saying he had "very compelling" new evidence of live prisoners. He also asked the Justice Department to investigate ten federal officials for perjury and other crimes in conjunction with a cover-up of POW/MIA investigations, In what he dubbed "Operation Clean Sweep", Smith said the targeted officials had a "mind-set to debunk". Kerry and McCain both denounced Smith's actions, with McCain saying "In my dealings with these people, it is clear that mistakes may have been made in a very complex set of issues. But at no time was there any indication that they were giving anything but their most dedicated efforts. I frankly don't feel it's appropriate to publicly make these charges without public substantiation." Defense Secretary Les Aspin said the charges were unwarranted.

In 1994, journalist Sydney Schanberg, who had won a Pulitzer Prize in the 1970s for his New York Times reporting in Cambodia, wrote a long article for Penthouse magazine in which he said the committee had been dominated by a faction led by Kerry that "wanted to appear to be probing the prisoner issue energetically, but in fact, they never rocked official Washington's boat, nor did they lay open the 20 years of secrecy and untruths." Schanberg stated that key committee staff had had too close a relationship with the Department of Defense, and that while other committee investigators were able to get evidence of men left behind into the full body of the report, the report's conclusions "were watered down and muddied to the point of meaninglessness." Kerry denied that the committee had engaged in any cover-up. Schanberg would return to the subject during Kerry's 2004 presidential campaign in a series of articles for The Village Voice; he claimed that Kerry had shredded documents, suppressed testimony, and sanitized findings during his time as chairman of the committee. Kerry denied these allegations and responded overall by saying, "In the end, I think what we can take pride in is that we put together the most significant, most thorough, most exhaustive accounting for missing and former P.O.W.'s in the history of human warfare."

The 2004 documentary Missing, Presumed Dead: The Search for America's POWs, narrated by Ed Asner, included a number of segments showing the committee in hearings and criticism of the committee's actions. It includes one scene where a former Korean War POW is giving testimony in hearings and, in not atypical congressional practice, only one senator, Smith, was present. The witness asked, "Where are all the other senators?" and an embarrassed Kerry eventually rushed in. While the documentary repeats previous allegations about McCain's behavior as a POW, in his own interview in it Smith simply states, "John McCain, and John Kerry, both were not pursuing this with the same approach that I was."

All three of the main figures on the committee would run for president. Smith ran a brief campaign for the 2000 race; in his announcement speech, he said, "Our nation's POWs and MIAs sacrificed their own freedom to protect our freedom and were never heard from again. Their ultimate fate is still unknown. I have traveled to every corner of the world on behalf of the POW/MIA families searching for answers — trying to end their uncertainty. I have had to bang on the doors of our own Government to open up intelligence files. Never again will these families have to beg our government and foreign governments for answers about their loved ones. Never again." Smith's candidacy failed to gain traction, and he switched parties twice during 1999 before dropping out and endorsing Republican George W. Bush. Four years later, again a Republican, Smith would break party lines and endorse Kerry during the latter's 2004 presidential campaign. During that campaign Kerry's role in the committee was greatly overshadowed by his Vietnam Veterans Against the War participation during the war and by the Swift Boat Veterans for Truth attack against him during the campaign. McCain would run in both 2000 and 2008; during the infamous South Carolina primary in 2000, allegations that he had abandoned POW/MIAs were part of the smear campaign against him.
