= Navy Distinguished Public Service Award =

American civilian award

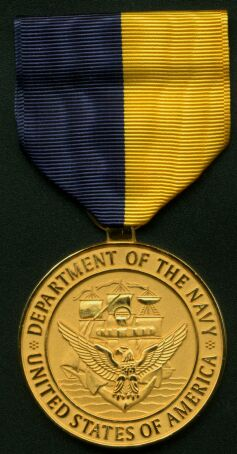
- Medal of the award
- Awarded for: Specific courageous or heroic acts or exceptionally outstanding service of substantial and long-term benefit to the Navy, Marine Corps, or Department of the Navy as a whole.
- Country: United States
- Presented by: Secretary of the Navy
- Eligibility: Private citizens not employed by the Department of the Navy
- Status: Active
- Ribbon bar of the award

Precedence
- Next (higher): Navy Meritorious Civilian Service Award
- Next (lower): Navy Superior Public Service Award

The Navy Distinguished Public Service Award, established in 1951, is an award presented by the U.S. Secretary of the Navy to civilians for specific courageous or heroic acts or exceptionally outstanding service of substantial and long-term benefit to the Navy, Marine Corps, or Department of the Navy as a whole. Originally a certificate with a lapel pin, the medal was first presented in July 1951. It is the highest recognition that the Secretary of the Navy may pay to a civilian not employed by the Department of the Navy.

Since 1951, the prestigious medal has been awarded to only 28 recipients including Tom Cruise, George Halas, Tom Hanks, Nancy Pelosi, Joseph Rosenthal, and Steven Spielberg.

== Design ==
The medal, designed by the United States Mint, is gold in color. The obverse has the Seal of the Navy Department, encircled by the inscription above "Department of the Navy" and below, "United States of America." The reverse has the words "Awarded to" with a blank tablet for inscription of the recipient's name, resting on a spray of laurel. Arched at the top rim of the reverse of the medal is the word "Distinguished." Horizontally, below the tablet, is the word "Public" and arched along the bottom rim is the word "Service." The medal is suspended by a ribbon using the colors of the United States Navy, half blue on the left, and half golden-yellow on the right. In addition to the medal it consists of a miniature medal, lapel bar, rosette, and a certificate signed by the Secretary of the Navy.

== Notable recipients ==
Notable recipients include Joe Rosenthal, Pulitzer Prize winning photographer, known for the iconic photo, Raising the Flag on Iwo Jima.

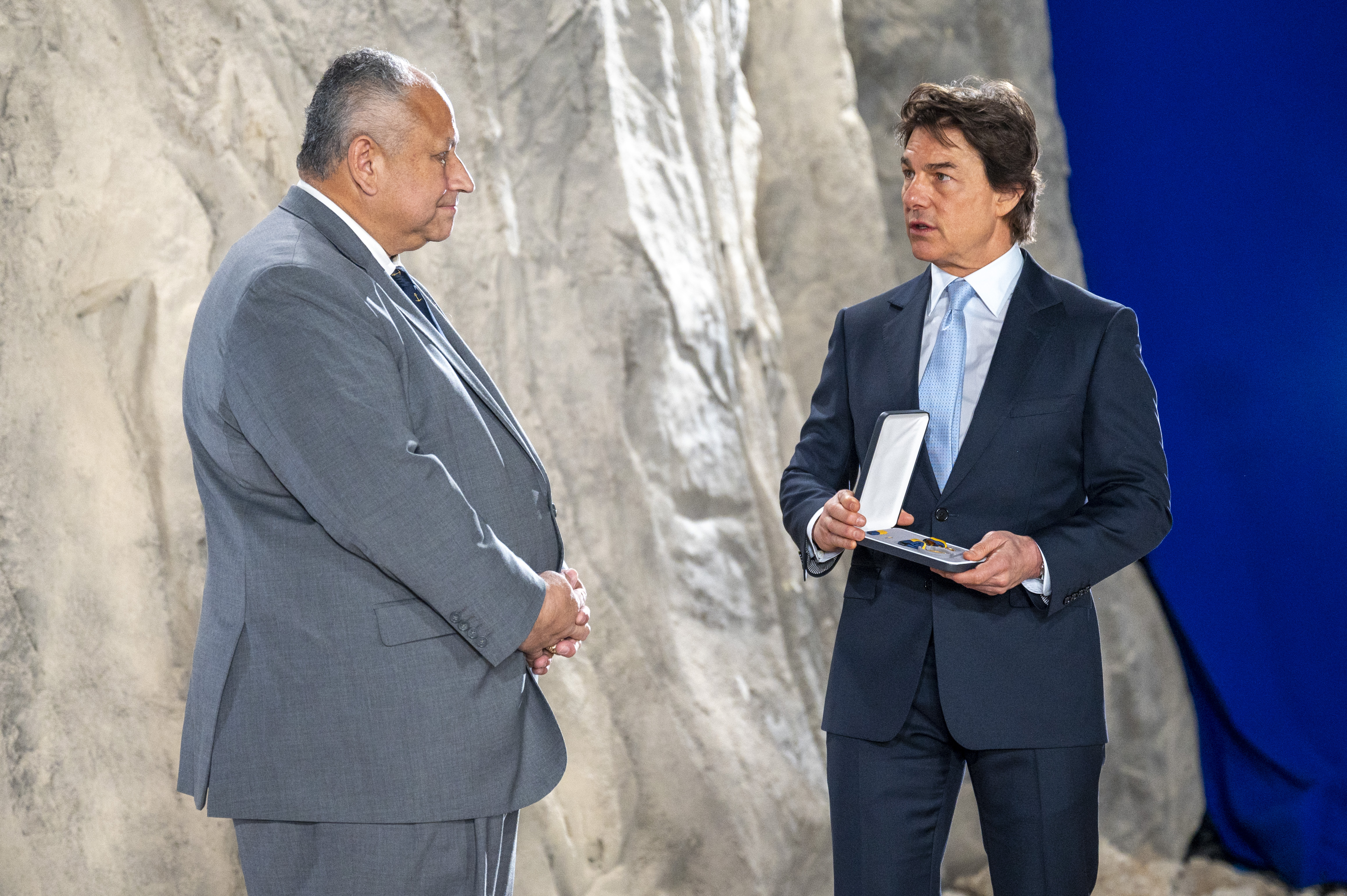
Secretary of the Navy Carlos Del Toro presenting the award to Tom Cruise in 2024

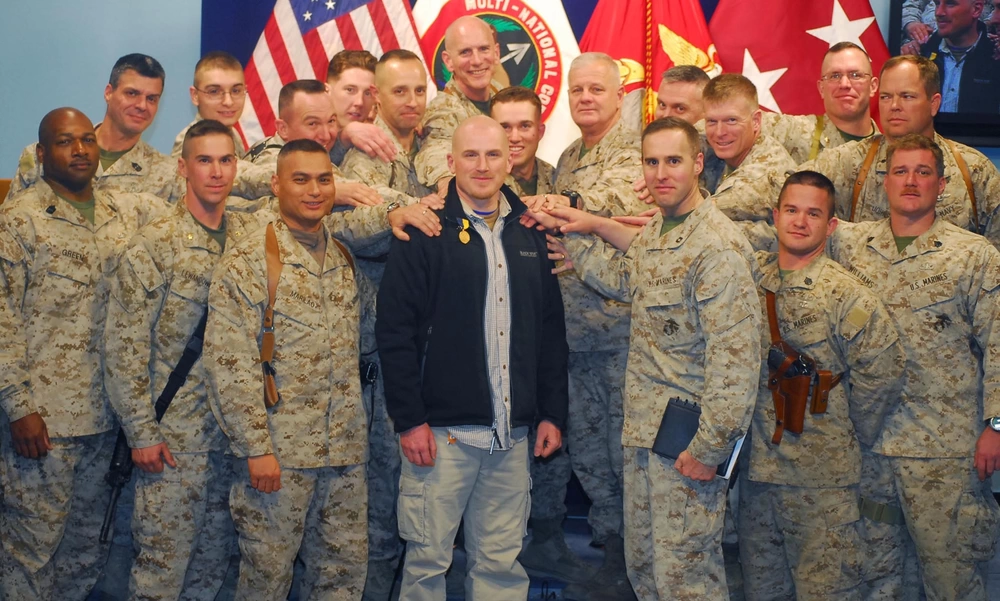
Chris Jackson, a network cameraman, and Marines from Multi-National Force and Corps-Iraq pose for a group picture at an awards ceremony Jan. 24

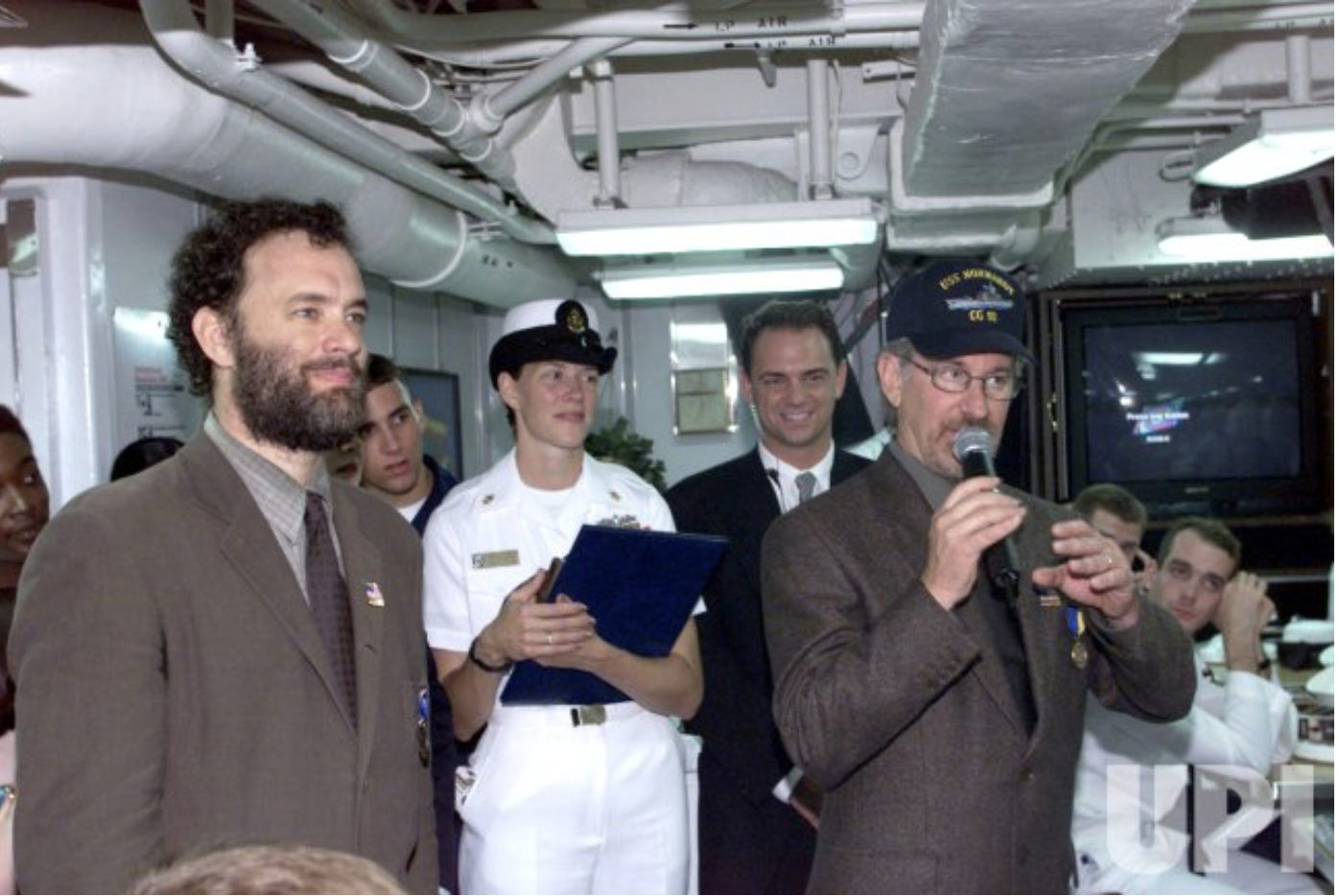
Hanks and Spielberg were aboard the USS Normandy to receive the Distinguished Public Service Award from the U.S. Navy during a Veteran's Day celebration.

Actor Tom Cruise received the award in 2024. Cruise was honored for "outstanding contributions to the Navy and the Marine Corps" with Top Gun and other films. Secretary of the Navy Carlos Del Toro presented the 62-year-old actor at Longcross Studios near London. "Tom Cruise has spent nearly four decades as an unwavering supporter of the men, women and families of the Navy and Marine Corps", Del Toro said. Two of the movie star's biggest hits, ::Top Gun': and ':Top Gun: Maverick', celebrate the world of naval aviators. When he received the honor, Cruise said he was proud of the "extraordinary acknowledgment."

For their work on their film Saving Private Ryan, actor Tom Hanks and director Steven Spielberg received the US Navy Distinguished Public Service award in 1999. The award was presented on Veterans Day to honor the film's positive portrayal of U.S. service members. The Navy invited Spielberg and Hanks aboard the USS Normandy at Port Everglades, south of Fort Lauderdale, Florida to bestow the award. Under-Secretary of the Navy Jerry Hultin said Spielberg and Hanks had "dramatically increased the American public's awareness and appreciation of the sacrifices made by US veterans during the battle of Normandy". During the ceremony, which was part of Veterans Day events in the US, Spielberg and Hanks thanked the veterans for the sacrifices they made for the country.

Cameraman Christopher Jackson received the award for rescuing Marine Corps Sergeant Courtney Rauch from a burning Humvee in the Helmand Province of Afghanistan in August 2008. While filming Oliver North's show on the Fox News Channel, the Humvee in which Jackson and Rauch were riding was struck by an improvised explosive device, knocking Rauch unconscious. Although injured in the blast, Jackson pulled Rauch from the vehicle to safety. Major General Paul E. Lefebvre presented Jackson with the award on January 24, 2009, at Al Faw Palace in Baghdad, Iraq.

Democratic Leader Nancy Pelosi was bestowed the Distinguished Public Service Award by U.S. Secretary of the Navy Ray Mabus at a ceremony in the Capitol in 2013. "The courage of our men and women in uniform is what makes our democracy possible, and the Distinguished Public Service Award is truly a tribute to the work of Congress to honor the service and sacrifice of our Navy and all of our service members", Pelosi said. "This award will hold a place of pride and prominence in my heart, and it will inspire me to always stand with Secretary Mabus, our officers, our sailors and Marines to ensure the security of our country and the strength of our military."

Sybil Stockdale, wife of the late Vice Admiral James Stockdale, was honored with the award for her work to publicize the mistreatment of POWs and campaign for their families during the Vietnam War. She co-founded the National League of Families. She is the only wife of an active-duty officer ever to have received this award.

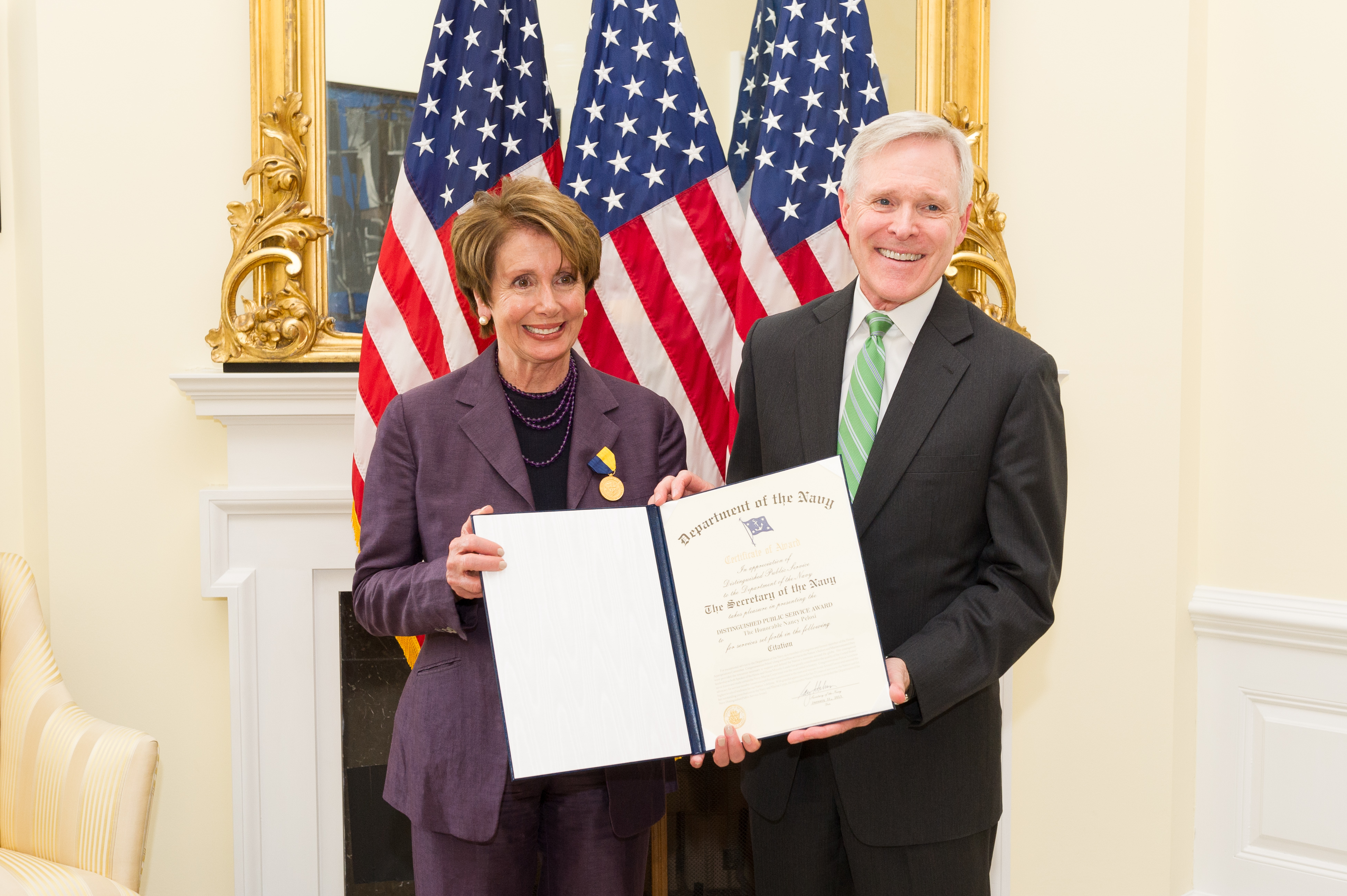
Democratic Leader Pelosi Receives U.S. Navy Distinguished Public Service Award (8661716622)

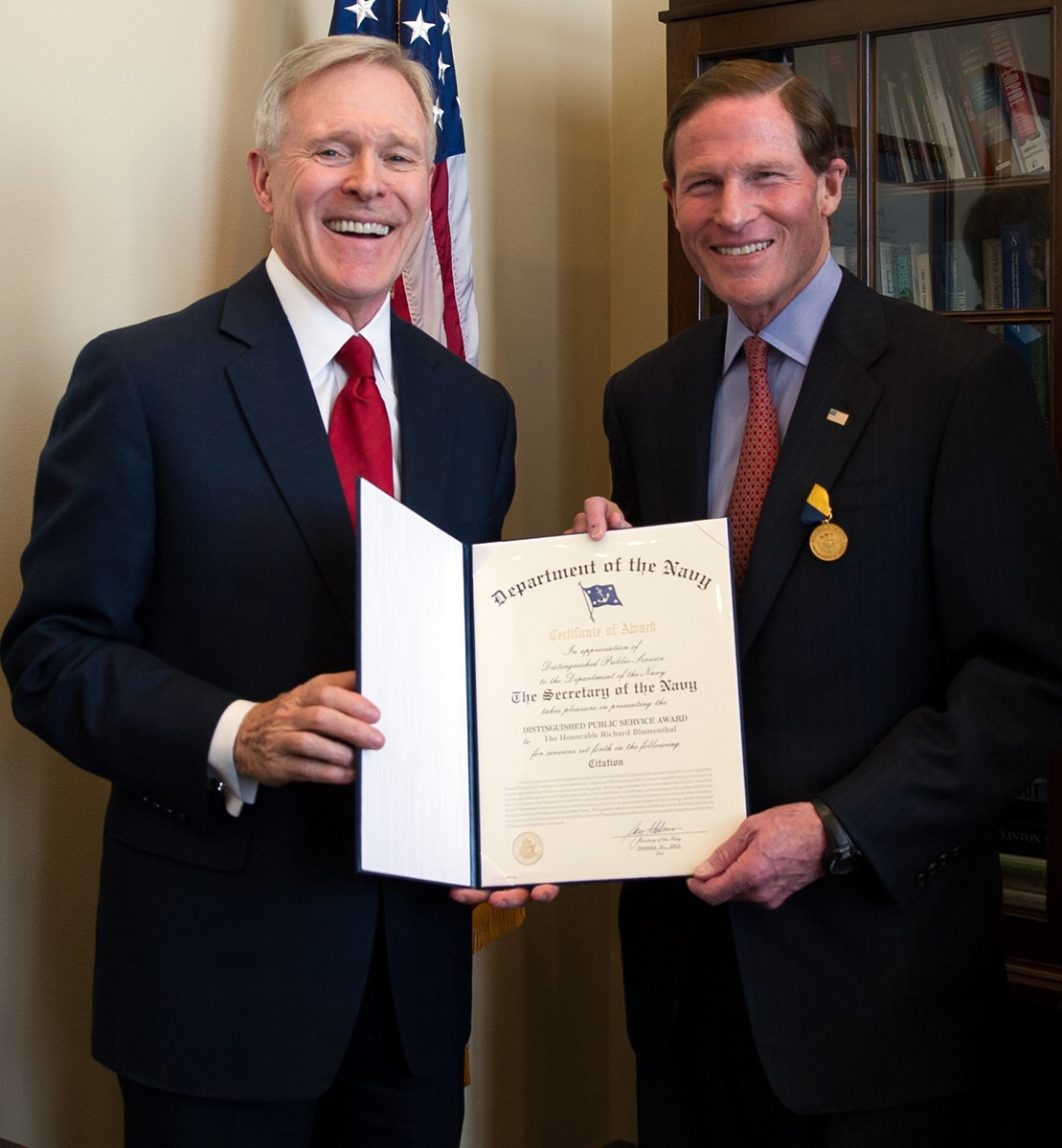
Secretary of the Navy Ray Mabus presents the Navy Distinguished Public Service Medal to U.S. Senator Richard Blumenthal

Representative John Murtha (D-Pa) received the award in 2009 for his "courageous leadership, vision, and loyalty to the men and women of the Department of the Navy." At the time of his award, Murtha was the influential chairman of the House Appropriations Committee's Defense Subcommittee.

Representative Rodney Frelinghuysen (R-NJ) received the award in 2013. Frelinghuysen, also a sitting member of the Defense Subcommittee, was recognized for his "long and selfless service to the nation's sailors and Marines [that] ensured they were provided the resources necessary to support and defend the nation's interests around the globe."

Captain John Bunch received the award in 2018. Bunch was honored for his devotion and support of US Navy and US Marines returning from combat from 2005 onwards. 3,993 US Troops have received free R&R, 103 free weddings, same-day PTSD counseling, and direct assistance with the deceased. Bunch was also awarded the Army Outstanding Civilian Service Medal.

Tim Taylor, an ocean explorer and founder of Lost 52 Project, was bestowed the Distinguished Public Service Award by U.S. Secretary of the Navy in 2021. The medal was awarded in a private ceremony at the National Museum of the U.S. Navy in Washington DC. Taylor and his "Lost 52 Project" have discovered and documented seven WWII submarines and the final resting places of 288 servicemen.

Chicago Bears owner George Halas was given the award in 1956. Halas served as an ensign in the United States Navy during World War I, and returned to the Navy after the advent of World War II in 1942 as lieutenant commander. He served overseas for 20 months under the command of Admiral Chester Nimitz. His duties were supporting the welfare and recreational activities of the Seventh Fleet. After the war, he organized the Armed Forces Benefit Football Game to fundraise for military relief charities; his award was presented at halftime of the 1956 game.
