= Bùi Tín =

Vietnamese activist (1927–2018)

- Born: 29 December 1927; Hanoi, French Indochina
- Died: 11 August 2018 (aged 90) Montreuil, Paris, France
- Allegiance: North Vietnam
- Branch: People's Army of Vietnam
- Service years: 1945–1990
- Rank: Colonel
- Conflicts: Vietnam War

Bùi Tín (29 December 1927 – 11 August 2018) was a Vietnamese dissident and People's Army of Vietnam (PAVN) colonel, serving in the PAVN general staff. After the war, he became disillusioned by corruption and the continuing isolation of the newly unified Vietnam. He decided to leave Vietnam and live in exile in Paris to express his growing dissatisfaction with the Communist Party of Vietnam and their political system.

== Early life and education ==
Tín was born near Hanoi on 29 December 1927, and was educated in Huế.

== Career ==
During the August Revolution in 1945, Tín became an active supporter to politically pressure the government of France to cede Vietnam its independence. He later joined the Việt Minh along with Chairman Hồ Chí Minh and General Võ Nguyên Giáp. He would fight on two sides of the line, using both weapons and his skills as a journalist for the Vietnam People's Army newspaper. He enlisted in the Vietnamese People's Army at age 18. He was wounded during the 1954 Battle of Dien Bien Phu.

Tín would serve on the general staff of the army. During the Vietnam War, he had authority from Defense Minister Võ Nguyên Giáp to visit any of the camps where American Prisoners of War (PoW) were held, meet with the camp officers, look at the PoW files, and interview the PoW's. During at least one such occasion, he was involved in an interrogation of John McCain.

Tín was with the PAVN in the South in 1975, reporting for Nhân Dân. Western media often claims to have been called into service at the Fall of Saigon because of his Army rank of colonel and to have personally accepted the surrender of Dương Văn Minh and his Cabinet, this was disputed by the Vietnamese government as well as by Tín himself, claiming the act to Colonel Bùi Văn Tùng.

After the war ended, he went on to serve as the Vice Chief Editor of Nhân Dân (The People), the official newspaper of the Communist Party of Vietnam), responsible for the Sunday People's (Nhân Dân Chủ Nhật). He became disillusioned in the mid-1980s with postwar corruption and the continuing isolation of Vietnam. In 1990, Tín decided to leave Vietnam and emigrated to Paris, deciding to stay after being invited by the French newspaper L'Humanité after becoming disillusioned with the Communist Party of Vietnam and Vietnam's political system.

In November 1991, Tín became involved in the Vietnam War POW/MIA issue when he appeared before hearings of the United States Senate Select Committee on POW/MIA Affairs in Washington, D.C. He stated that, "I can say that I know as well as any top leader in Vietnam and, in my opinion, I state categorically that there is not any American prisoner alive in Vietnam." After his testimony, he and former PoW John McCain embraced, which produced a flurry of "Former Enemies Embrace" style headlines. Tín's testimony was the subject of anticipation: when he had arrived at Dulles International Airport three weeks earlier, former U.S. Congressman Bill Hendon and a staff assistant to the committee's vice-chair Bob Smith confronted Tín and tried to convince him that there were live prisoners in Vietnam; Tín felt it was an intimidation attempt.

Tín subsequently published two books, Following Ho Chi Minh: The Memoirs of a North Vietnamese Colonel (University of Hawaii Press, 1995) and From Enemy To Friend: A North Vietnamese Perspective on the War (U.S. Naval Institute Press, 2002).

In a 2000 PBS American Experience forum, he maintained that no captured U.S. soldiers had been tortured during their captivity in North Vietnam during the war. He conceded the same might not be true of captured United States Air Force pilots, going so far as calling some of their alleged treatment "a violation of the International Agreement on Prisoner of War".

He died aged 90 in Montreuil, France on 11 August 2018.
