= National Alliance of Families =

The National Alliance of Families for the Return of America's Missing Servicemen is an American organization founded in 1990. Its goal is to resolve the fates of any unreturned U.S. prisoners of war or missing in action from World War II on forward, and to gain the return of any live prisoners.

The group is a 1980s splinter from the older National League of Families, created by members who were dissatisfied with Ann Mills Griffiths' leadership. Compared to the older group, the National Alliance takes a more activist, radical stance, especially with regards towards the Vietnam War POW/MIA issue and belief in the existence of live prisoners in Southeast Asia.

The chair and co-founder of the group is Dolores Apodaca Alfond, whose brother Major Victor Joe Apodaca was shot down in 1967 during the Vietnam War. The group was visible during the United States Senate Select Committee on POW/MIA Affairs hearings of the early 1990s, but disagreed with the committee's findings that there was no compelling evidence of any live prisoners in Southeast Asia. More than sixteen hundred U.S. servicemen are still listed as missing in action in Southeast Asia. The National Alliance of Families has also championed the case of Gulf War missing airman Scott Speicher, and also U.S. Prisoners of War or Missing in Action statuses service members in the current Iraq and Afghanistan conflicts as well.
