= Eberle Associates =

Eberle Associates is an American company that specializes in direct mail campaigns for causes particular to American conservatism.

The company has been active in many fundraising causes, from the Vietnam War POW/MIA issue in the early 1980s to providing most of the funding for the American Civil Rights Union in the 2000s. More recently they have raised funds for Young America's Foundation, Sixty Plus and Radio America. Their company profile states that "for more than four decades Eberle and Associates has raised over a billion dollars for our clients." The firm has long been based in Virginia.

The founder and former president, Bruce W. Eberle, was also president of Eberle Communications Group and Fund Raising Strategies, Inc. In 2019 Eberle sold his companies to the employees via an Employee Stock Ownership Plan (ESOP). In 2005 a sister firm Omega List Company offered to pay conservative commentators to endorse causes.
