= POW/MIA flag =

US flag of the National League of Families POW/MIA

National League of Families of American Prisoners and Missing in Southeast Asia
- National League of Families POW/MIA flag
- Use: Other
- Proportion: 9:14
- Adopted: January 1972
- Design: A silhouette of a prisoner of war (POW) before a guard tower and barbed wire in white on a black field. "POW/MIA" appears above the silhouette and the words "You Are Not Forgotten" appear below in white on the black field. "MIA" stands for "missing in action".
- Designed by: Newt Heisley

The National League of Families POW/MIA flag, often referred to as the POW/MIA flag, was adopted in 1972 and consists of the official emblem of the National League of Families of American Prisoners and Missing in Southeast Asia in white on a black background. Since 2019 (the year the National POW/MIA Flag Act was signed into law), the POW/MIA flag has been flown on certain federal properties, including the U.S. Capitol Building, on all days the U.S. flag is flown.

The flag symbolizes support and care for the soldiers, airmen, and sailors who served the United States in the Vietnam War, especially those who endured capture by the enemy. There has not been a verified American POW in Southeast Asia since Pvt. Robert R. Garwood was released in 1979.

== History ==
In 1971, during the Vietnam War, Mary Hoff, member of the National League of Families of American Prisoners and Missing in Southeast Asia and wife of missing in action (MIA) Lt. Commander Michael Hoff U.S.N., proposed the creation of a symbol for American prisoners of war (POW) and those who are MIA. The POW/MIA flag was created for the National League of Families of American Prisoners and Missing in Southeast Asia and is officially recognized by the U.S. Congress in conjunction with the Vietnam War POW/MIA issue, "as the symbol of our Nation's concern and commitment to resolving as fully as possible the fates of Americans still prisoner, missing and unaccounted for in Southeast Asia, thus ending the uncertainty for their families and the Nation." National League of Families national coordinator Evelyn Grubb, wife of a POW, oversaw its development and also campaigned to gain its widespread acceptance and use by the U.S. federal government, local governments, and civilian organizations across the United States.

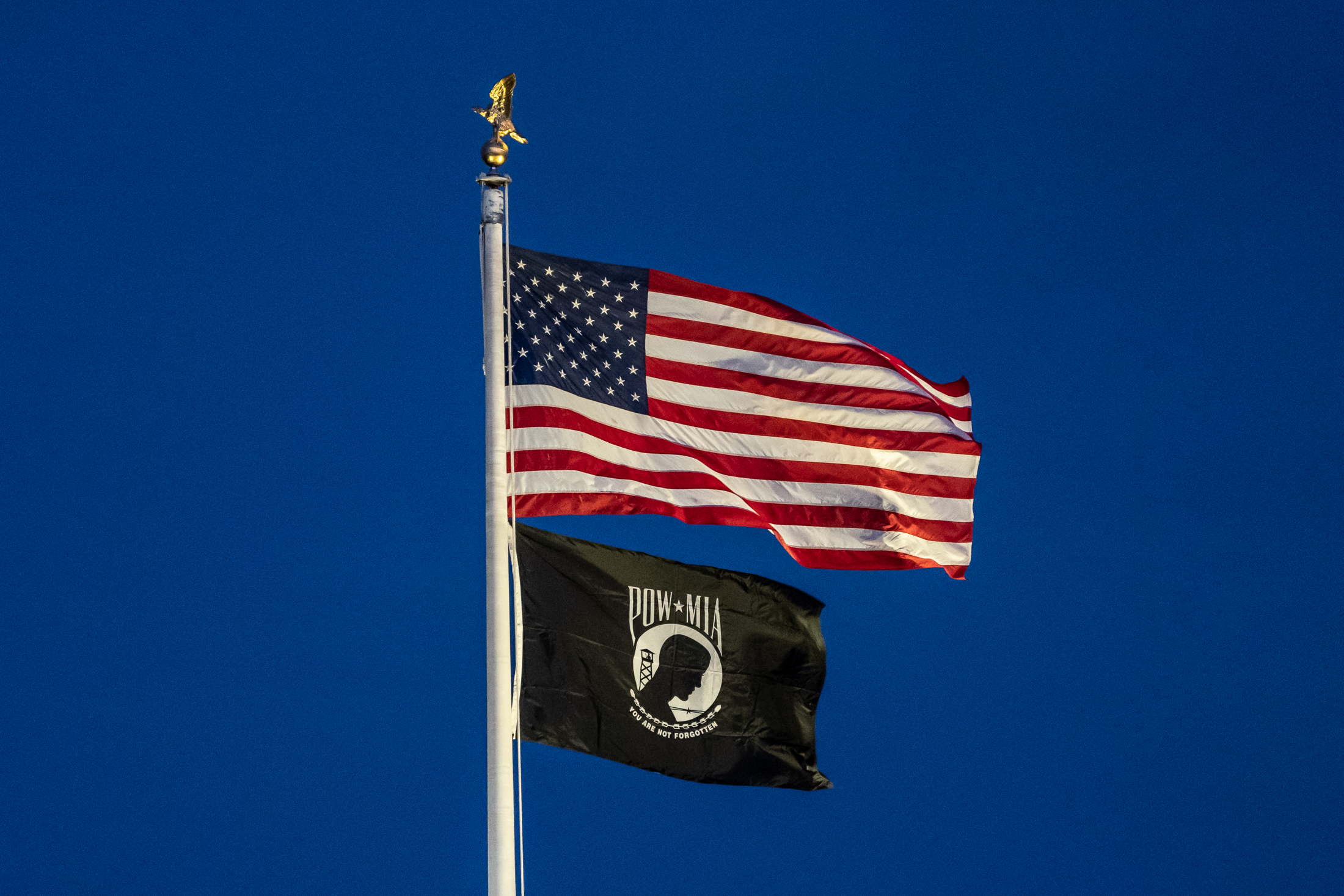
The United States and POW/MIA flags flying atop the White House

The POW/MIA flag was flown over the White House for the first time in September 1982. On March 9, 1989, a league flag that had flown over the White House on the 1988 National POW/MIA Recognition Day was installed in the U.S. Capitol rotunda as a result of legislation passed by the 100th Congress. The leadership of both houses of Congress hosted the installation ceremony in a demonstration of bipartisan congressional support. On August 10, 1990, the 101st Congress passed U.S. Public Law 101-355, recognizing the National League of Families POW/MIA flag and designating it "as a symbol of our Nation's concern and commitment to resolving as fully as possible the fates of Americans still prisoner, missing and unaccounted for in Southeast Asia, thus ending the uncertainty for their families and the Nation." Beyond Southeast Asia, it has been a symbol for POW/MIAs from all U.S. wars.

In October 2017, state government buildings in Maryland began flying the POW/MIA flag outside. On November 7, 2019, the National POW/MIA Flag Act was signed into law, requiring the POW/MIA flag to be flown on certain federal properties, including the U.S. Capitol Building, White House, federal war memorials, U.S. national cemeteries, offices of U.S. defense ministers, major military installations, Department of Veterans Affairs medical centers, and Post office buildings, on all days the U.S. flag is flown.Previously, the flag was only flown on Armed Forces Day, Memorial Day, Flag Day, Independence Day, National POW/MIA Recognition Day, and Veterans Day.

The flag may be seen as implying that personnel listed as MIA may in fact be held captive. However, the official, bipartisan, U.S. federal government position is that there is "no compelling evidence that proves that any American remains alive in captivity in Southeast Asia". The U.S. Defense POW/MIA Accounting Agency provides centralized management of prisoner of war and missing personnel affairs within the U.S. Department of Defense and is responsible for investigating the status of POW/MIA issues. As of October 2020, 1,585 Americans remained unaccounted for, of which 1,007 were classified as further pursuit, 488 as no further pursuit and 90 as deferred.

== Design ==
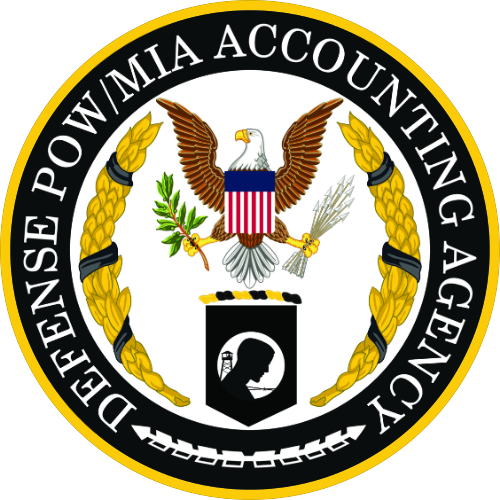
Seal of the U.S. Defense POW/MIA Accounting Agency

The POW/MIA flag consists of a silhouette of a POW before a guard tower and barbed wire in white on a black field. "POW/MIA" appears above the silhouette and the words "YOU ARE NOT FORGOTTEN" appear below in white on the black field. The original design for the flag was created by Newt Heisley. In 1971, a New Jersey–based agency he worked for assigned him to create a flag for their client, Annin & Company, which had been given the task to create the flag by Mary Hoff, the wife of Lt. Commander Michael Hoff U.S.N., a service member missing in action, and a member of the National League of Families of American Prisoners and Missing in Southeast Asia.

== Protocol ==
When displayed from a single flagpole, the POW/MIA flag should fly directly below, and be no larger than, the U.S. flag. For federal agencies under a chain of command the U.S. Flag Code has a complete order of precedence that mirrors Army Regulations 840–10, paragraph 2-2c. If on separate poles, the U.S. flag should always be placed to the right of other flags (the viewer's left; the flag's own right). On the six national observances for which Congress has ordered display of the flag, it is generally flown immediately below or adjacent to the U.S. flag as second in order of precedence. In the U.S. Armed Forces; the dining halls, mess halls, and chow halls display a single table and chair in a corner draped with the flag as a symbol for the missing, thus reserving a chair in hopes of their return. POW/MIA Flag is also present at Veterans' organizations local chapters, state and national conventions.

The National POW/MIA Flag Act ensures that the POW/MIA Flag is displayed whenever the U.S. flag is displayed at certain locations. Those locations include the U.S. Capitol, the White House, the World War II Memorial, the Korean War Veterans Memorial, the Vietnam Veterans Memorial, every national cemetery, the buildings containing the official offices of the Secretaries of State, Defense, and Veterans Affairs, the office of the Director of the Selective Service System, each major military installation (as designated by the Secretary of Defense), each Department of Veterans Affairs medical center, clinics and Veterans Benefits Administration offices and each United States Postal Service post office.

== See also ==
- List of black flags
- List of flags of the United States
- Vietnam War POW/MIA issue
