= National POW/MIA Recognition Day =

U.S. remembrance day for POWs and MIAs

In the United States, National POW/MIA Recognition Day is observed on the third Friday in September. It honors those who were prisoners of war (POWs) and those who are still missing in action (MIA). It is most associated with those who were POWs during the Vietnam War. National Vietnam War Veterans Day is March 29, the date in 1973 when the last US combat troops departed the Republic of Vietnam.

Original POW/MIA flag Newt Heisley designed image

== History ==
The POW/MIA flag was first recognized on August 10, 1990 by Pub. L. 101-355 which marked September 21 of that year for commemoration.

== Observance / Display ==
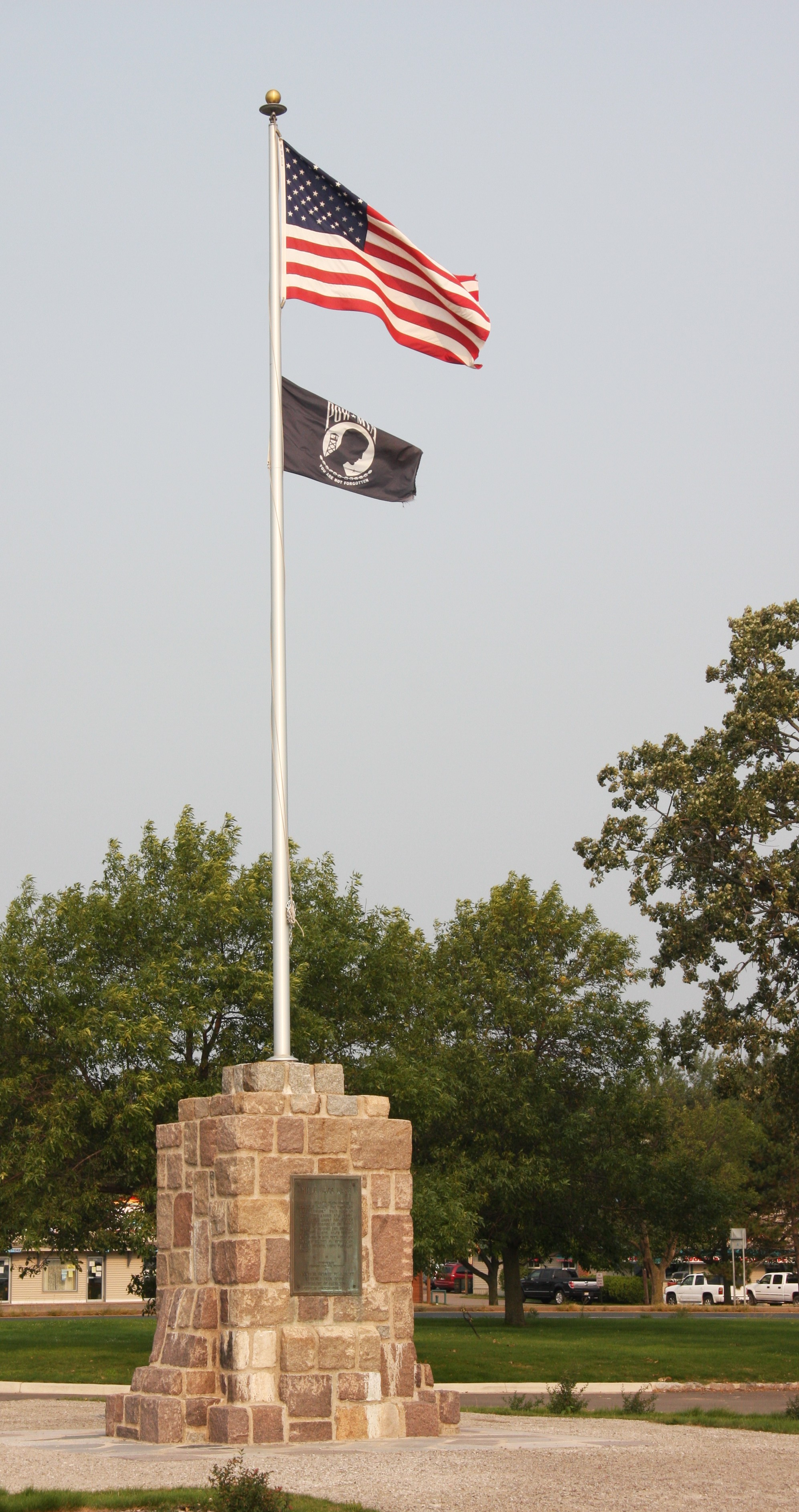
POW/MIA flag flying below the US flag.

The POW/MIA Flag should fly below, and not be larger than, the United States flag. It is generally flown immediately below or adjacent to the United States flag as second in order of precedence.

== National Former Prisoner of War Recognition Day ==
National Former Prisoner of War Recognition Day is different and separate from National POW/MIA Recognition Day. National Former Prisoner of War Recognition Day is April 9. It was officially designated by Congress in 1988, Public Law 100-269 [Sen J Res 253 100th Congress]. as a Presidentially-proclaimed observance. National Former POW Recognition Day commemorates the April 9, 1942 surrender of approximately 10,000 United States military personnel and 65,000 Filipino soldiers on the Bataan Peninsula in the Philippines by Major General Edward P. King to the invading Imperial Japanese Army headed by General Masaharu Homma. Bataan, thereafter, is distinguished as the largest mass surrender in United States military history. The surrender was followed immediately by the infamous Bataan Death March. By law, the President of the United States must issue annually a proclamation.

The Bataan Death March began on April 9, 1942, and lasted, for some, almost two weeks. The Imperial Japanese Army forced all American and Filipino POWs on a 65-mile trek up from Mariveles at the tip of the Bataan Peninsula north to the San Fernando train station. At San Fernando, the men were packed standing in unventilated boxcars for a 24-mile journey by rail to Capas. Survivors then marched an additional three miles to the makeshift POW camp at Camp O’Donnell, an unfinished Philippine Army training facility. It is estimated that at least 10 percent of the men on the March died en route. Sick and starving, the surrendered American and Filipino soldiers on the Bataan Death March were robbed of their personal possessions, denied food, water, and medical care while subject to being beaten, bayoneted, beheaded, crushed by trucks and tanks, and executed.

Although this remembrance day is for all who were POWs, it is most associated with those who were POWs of Imperial Japan during WWII.

== See also ==
- List of observances in the United States by presidential proclamation
- U.S. Hostage and Wrongful Detainee Day
