= Vietnam War POW/MIA issue =

Fate of missing US servicemen of the Vietnam War

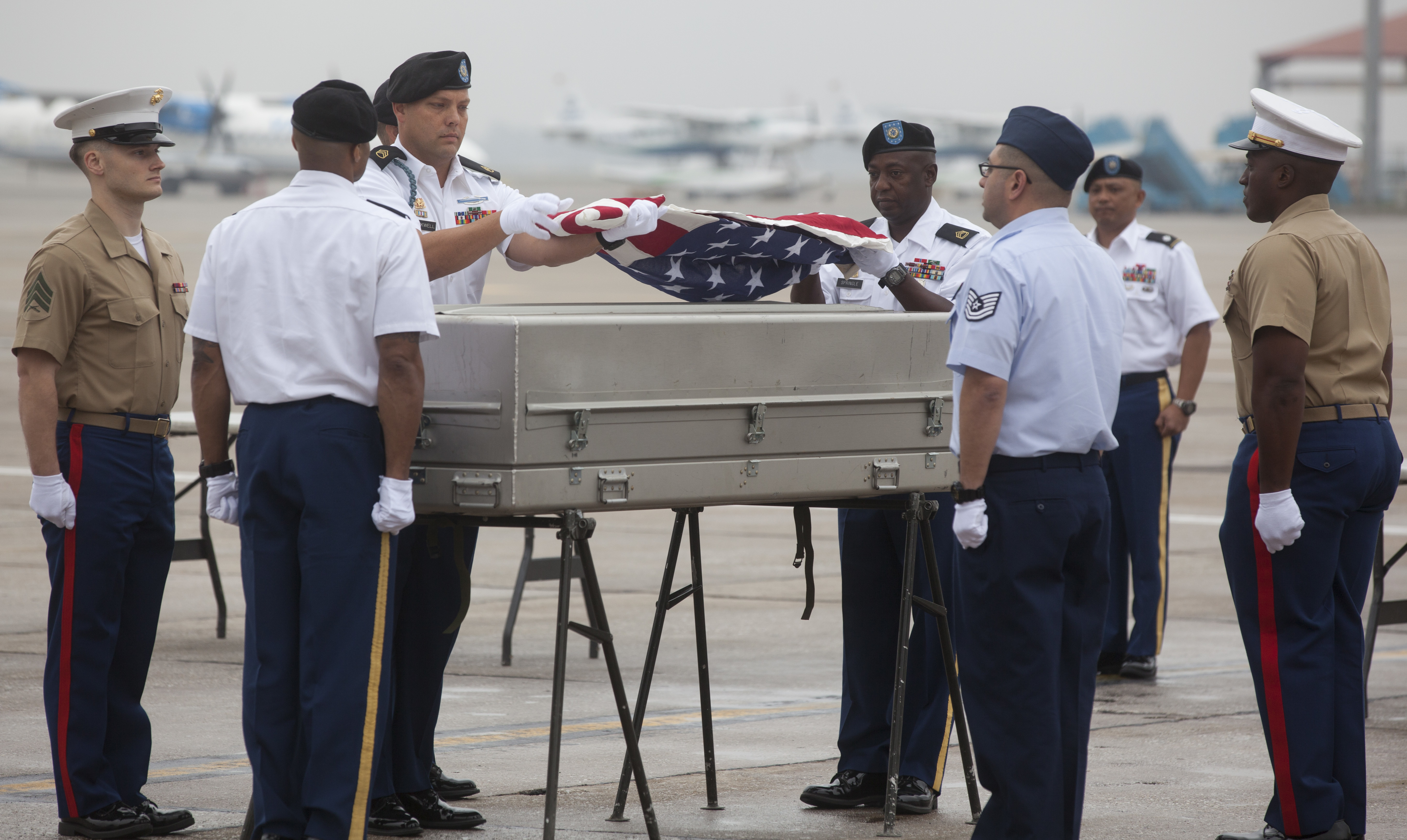
U.S. service members unfold a U.S. flag over transfer case containing the remains of unidentified U.S. service members in Vietnam, at Hanoi.

The Vietnam War POW/MIA issue concerns the fate of United States servicemen who were reported as prisoners of war (POWs) or missing in action (MIA) during the Vietnam War and associated theaters of operation in Southeast Asia. As of 2026, operations by the U.S. government to account for servicemen missing in action during the Vietnam War are still ongoing by the Defense POW/MIA Accounting Agency (DPAA).

At the end of the Vietnam War in 1975, 2,646 American service members were listed as missing in action. As of 2026, according to the DPAA, the remains of 1,067 Americans have been identified and returned to families for burial with U.S. military honors. While 1,566 Americans are still considered by the DPAA to be unaccounted for, a significant portion thereof are presumed dead and their remains "non-recoverable".

Following the Paris Peace Accords of 1973, 591 U.S. POWs were returned during Operation Homecoming. Many of those missing were airmen who were shot down over North Vietnam or Laos. Investigations of these incidents have involved determining whether the men involved survived being shot down; if they did not, the U.S. government made efforts to recover their remains. Progress in resolving these cases was slow until the mid-1980s, when relations between the United States and Vietnam began to improve and more cooperative efforts were undertaken. Normalization of the U.S. relations with Vietnam in the mid-1990s was a culmination of this process.

Considerable speculation and investigation have been devoted to a hypothesis that a significant number of missing U.S. service members from the Vietnam War were captured as prisoners of war by communist forces and kept as live prisoners after U.S. involvement in the war concluded in 1973. A vocal group of POW/MIA activists has maintained that there has been a concerted conspiracy by the Vietnamese and U.S. governments since then to hide the existence of these prisoners. The U.S. government has steadfastly denied that prisoners were left behind or that any effort has been made to cover up their existence. Popular culture has reflected the "live prisoners" theory, such as in the 1985 film Rambo: First Blood Part II. Several congressional investigations have looked into the issue, culminating with the largest and most thorough, the United States Senate Select Committee on POW/MIA Affairs of 1991–1993, which found "no compelling evidence that proves that any American remains alive in captivity in Southeast Asia".

== Origins ==
The origins of the POW/MIA issue date back to the war itself. Suffering from a lack of accurate intelligence sources inside North Vietnam, the United States never had solid knowledge of how many U.S. prisoners of war were held. Indeed, the United States often relied upon possibly inaccurate North Vietnamese newspapers and radio broadcasts to find out who had been captured, as well as memorized lists of names brought out by the few U.S. POWs given early release. As the Department of Defense built up lists of those in the categories of killed in action, killed in action/body not recovered, prisoner of war and missing in action, its tentative numbers fluctuated, but most of the time, the number of expected returnees upon war's end was around 600. However, the Nixon administration had made return of the POWs one of its central arguments to the American public for prolonging the war and bringing North Vietnam to terms. In doing so, the administration overstated the number of POWs at issue, at one point stating that there were "fifteen hundred American servicemen" held throughout Southeast Asia. These higher numbers would be the focus of much of the controversy over the issue in the years to come.

Following the Paris Peace Accords of January 1973, U.S. prisoners of war were returned during Operation Homecoming from February through April 1973. During this, 591 POWs were released to U.S. authorities; this included a few captured in Laos and released in North Vietnam. U.S. president Richard Nixon announced that all U.S. servicemen taken prisoner had been accounted for. At that time, the United States listed 2,646 Americans as unaccounted for, including about 1,350 prisoners of war or missing in action and roughly 1,200 reported killed in action and body not recovered. The low numbers of returnees from Laos caused some immediate concern, as previous Pentagon estimates were as high as 41 for prisoners held there, although only a few had been known to be captured for certain. By late 1973, the remains of over 700 Americans killed in Southeast Asia had been returned and identified.

Investigation of the fate of all the missing service personnel would end up residing with the Defense Prisoner of War/Missing Personnel Office. The Joint POW/MIA Accounting Command also played a major role in subsequent investigations. In 1973, the Defense Department established the Central Identification Laboratory–Thailand to coordinate POW/MIA recovery efforts in Southeast Asia.

The United States conducted some limited operations in South Vietnam in 1974 to find the remains of those missing, and according to the Paris Accords, the North Vietnamese returned some remains too. These efforts halted following the collapse of the Accords and the fall of South Vietnam in 1975, and over the next ten years, little progress was made in recovering remains.

During the late 1970s and 1980s, the friends and relatives of unaccounted-for U.S. personnel became politically active, requesting the United States government reveal what steps were taken to follow up on intelligence regarding last-known-alive MIAs and POWs. When initial inquiries revealed important information had not been pursued, many families and their supporters asked for the public release of POW/MIA records and called for an investigation.

U.S. Private First Class Robert R. Garwood is often cited as the last U.S. POW from the Vietnam War. In 1979, Garwood reemerged, claiming he and other POWs had remained imprisoned after the war. In a court-martial shortly after his return, he was found not guilty of desertion, solicitation of U.S. troops in the field to refuse to fight and to defect, and maltreatment. However, he was convicted on February 5, 1981, of communicating with the enemy and of the assault on a U.S. prisoner of war interned in a POW camp. Later independent investigations found no substantial evidence to support Garwood's claims and a Department of Defense investigation published in 1993 concluded Garwood was a collaborator with the enemy. A subsequent 1993 investigation conducted directly by Senator Bob Smith claimed to have found the building where Garwood was imprisoned, but the building's connection to Garwood is disputed.

== POW/MIA activist organizations ==
The National League of Families' POW/MIA flag; it was created in 1971 when the war was still in progress.

The National League of Families of American Prisoners and Missing in Southeast Asia was created by Sybil Stockdale, Evelyn Grubb and Mary Crowe as an originally small group of POW/MIA wives in Coronado, California, and Hampton Roads, Virginia, in 1967. Sybil Stockdale's husband, Navy Commander James Stockdale, was shot down in 1965 and she was determined to make the American people aware of the mistreatment of U.S. POWs. This publicity resulted in better treatment of U.S. POWs from fall 1969 on.

After the war, the National League of Families became the leading group requesting information about those still listed as missing in action. It was led by Ann Mills Griffiths. Its stated mission was and is "to obtain the release of all prisoners, the fullest possible accounting for the missing and repatriation of all recoverable remains of those who died serving our nation during the Vietnam War in Southeast Asia." The League's most prominent symbol is its POW/MIA flag. Newt Heisley designed this flag to represent America's missing men. This group was more established, less radical, and more connected to the government.

The National Alliance of Families For the Return of America's Missing Servicemen was founded in 1990. Its goal was and is to resolve the fates of any unreturned U.S. prisoners of war or missing in action from World War II on forward, not just Southeast Asia, and to gain the return of any live prisoners. It is a 1980s-origined splinter from the National League of Families, created by members who were dissatisfied with Ann Mills Griffiths' leadership. Compared to the older group, the National Alliance took a more activist, radical stance, especially towards belief in the existence of live prisoners in Southeast Asia.

The chair and co-founder of the group is Dolores Apodaca Alfond, whose brother Major Victor Joe Apodaca, Jr. was shot down in 1967 during the Vietnam War. The group was visible during the Kerry Committee hearings of the early 1990s, but disagreed with the committee's findings that there was no compelling evidence of any live prisoners in Southeast Asia.

Businessman and POW/MIA advocate Ross Perot, who had done much to help POW families during the war, was also very active on this issue.

== Recovery and "rescue" ==
From the perspective of the Defense POW/MIA Accounting Agency's history of the issue, by the late 1980s, the United States and Vietnam increased the frequency of high-level policy and technical meetings to help resolve the POW/MIA matter. The Vietnamese began allowing U.S. government search parties to operate within the country. The Laotian government also agreed to joint crash-site excavations in the late 1980s. In Cambodia, similar joint efforts began in the early 1990s. By 1992, major joint field operations were taking place in all three countries, operations that would carry on for years to come.

Several individuals were not satisfied with or did not trust U.S. government actions in this area and took their own initiative. Retired Air Force Lieutenant Colonel Jack E. Bailey created Operation Rescue, which featured a former freighter and smuggling boat named the S.S. Akuna and solicited funds from POW/MIA groups. While Bailey did pick up some Vietnamese refugees, he never produced any prisoners and the boat spent years never leaving its dock in Songkhla in Thailand. The effort did, however, prove adept at bringing in money through the Virginia-based Eberle Associates direct mail marketing firm. It was later revealed that Bailey had exaggerated his military record, claiming he had been a pilot flying combat missions when he had been a ground support officer and giving himself decorations he did not have. Financial reports indicated that Operation Rescue spent 89 percent of the funds it raised on further fundraising.

In the 1980s, former United States Army Special Forces member Bo Gritz conducted a series of private missions in Southeast Asia, purportedly to locate U.S. POWs that some believed were still being held in Laos and Vietnam, including at locations such as Nhommarath. These missions were highly publicized and controversial—some critics noted that successful secret operations typically do not involve bringing women to border towns to openly sell commemorative POW-rescue T-shirts.

One such mission in 1982 was to free POWs reported to be in Laos; Gritz led fifteen Laotians and three Americans, but they were ambushed shortly after crossing the border from Vietnam to Laos, and the mission failed. Command Sergeant Major Eric L. Haney, a former Delta Force commando and a holder of the live prisoners belief, later wrote that beginning in 1981 his unit was twice told to prepare for a mission involving the rescue of U.S. POWs being held by the North Vietnamese in camps in Laos, but both times the missions were scrubbed, for reasons unclear. The U.S. National Security Council would eventually say: "Throughout his years of involvement, Mr. Gritz contributed nothing of value to the POW/MIA issue. His activities have been counter-productive." Haney later said that years later, he met a former senior member of the North Vietnamese diplomatic corps, who asked him why the U.S. never tried getting their POWs back after the war's end. Regarding a Laos mission, Lieutenant General William G. "Jerry" Boykin, a former commander of Delta Force, briefly mentions in his 2008 memoir that at one time, Delta Force had been engaged in planning for a mission to "infiltrate Laos to search for American MIAs", but that the idea, like several unrelated missions that Delta Force had considered during its early years, had not gone forward due to the White House thinking it too risky a venture.

Another figure of the 1980s was Scott Barnes, who claimed he had both been in a secret operation in Cambodia and had seen an American POW. His actions caused significant dissension among POW/MIA activists, especially once he claimed that he had seen more American POWs in Laos but had been ordered by the Central Intelligence Agency to assassinate them. He published the 1987 book BOHICA that related this story. The National League of Families ended up accusing him of exploiting the MIA issue for personal gain, as one wife had mortgaged her house to fund him. Barnes, who had concocted much of his purported military background, would subsequently become a controversial figure within Ross Perot's 1992 presidential campaign.

A former American POW, Eugene "Red" McDaniel, also became convinced that American prisoners had been left behind, and became active in the issue during the 1980s and early 1990s.

== Effect on popular culture ==
In the words of one analyst, "The notion that the United States may have left men behind was hard to fathom, and Americans chose to partly solve this complex problem through fictional characters."

This was especially true in Hollywood films. The first was Chuck Norris's 1978 Good Guys Wear Black, which postulated a cynical U.S. government writing off MIAs with a bogus mission. 1983's Uncommon Valor, starring Gene Hackman, followed suit, as did Norris again in 1984 with Missing in Action. It was one of a series of films about rescuing POWs in Vietnam that were entirely fictional.

The most visible film in this theme was Sylvester Stallone's Rambo: First Blood Part II in 1985, which did the most to popularize the idea that U.S. POWs had been left behind after the war and that the government had no real interest in their rescue. The Rambo character, who in this film may have been partly modeled after Bo Gritz, was a Vietnam veteran commando still haunted by the multiple failures of the war. The pivotal moment of the film occurs when Rambo, realizing he was betrayed by the U.S. government and under torture from the Vietnamese and their Soviet allies, is put into radio communication with the officer who ordered the mission and tells him, "Murdock. I'm coming to get you!" Rambo and the Norris films were commercially successful in both the United States and in Thailand and other parts of Southeast Asia, and did much to perpetuate the stock image of American prisoners held in bamboo cages.

Rambo was followed by Norris's 1985 prequel Missing in Action 2: The Beginning, as well as other films such as P.O.W. The Escape (1986) and Dog Tags (1990) that shared similar conceits. The Vietnam war POW/MIA issue was also explored in some U.S. television series. The long-running series Magnum, P.I. included multiple episodes in the mid-late-1980s whose central theme was the possibility of U.S. POWs remaining in Vietnam. The 1997 The X-Files episode "Unrequited" also dealt with this notion. The POW/MIA issue was also part of a key storyline in the series JAG in the late 1990s, where the father of central character Harmon Rabb had been an MIA in Vietnam. During the second, third, and fourth seasons, evidence gradually mounted that Harm Sr. had been relocated to the Soviet Union, where he had later escaped and been killed by Soviet soldiers in Siberia.

== The "live prisoners" debate ==
Several committee investigations within the U.S. Congress took place over the years. Some members of Congress were quite active on the issue.

For Vietnam veteran Bob Smith, Representative and later Senator from New Hampshire, the fate of possible missing or captured Americans in Vietnam had been Smith's major issue since his arrival in Congress in 1985. His interest was partly motivated by his own experience growing up without knowing how his father died in World War II.

North Carolina Congressman Bill Hendon, who served two terms in the early-mid-1980s, was also quite active on the issue. He and Smith met with President Ronald Reagan in January 1986 to discuss their belief that Vietnam was still holding U.S. prisoners, and that U.S. intelligence agencies knew this but that the bureaucracy within the agencies was covering it up from even the Secretary of Defense. Reagan termed Hendon "way out yonder" on the issue, and after Vice President George H. W. Bush reported that even Smith would not agree with Hendon on some of these claims, Reagan concluded that "Bill is off his rocker".

New York Congressman John LeBoutillier, who served one term in the early 1980s, became interested in politics due to POW matters. After leaving Congress, he continued to be active in POW/MIA affairs. He founded the Sky Hook II Project, dedicated to recovering living U.S. POWs in Southeast Asia. He has made frequent trips to Laos and Vietnam and also met with Laotian and Vietnamese leaders in Hanoi, Ho Chi Minh City, Jakarta, Vientiane, and western cities. Another political figure active in the POW/MIA issue was Tom Walsh, who became mayor of Casper, Wyoming, and a member of the Wyoming House of Representatives, who made trips to Southeast Asia to search for information on POWs and MIAs.

The POW/MIA issue heated up in the early 1990s. Serious charges were leveled at the Bush administration (1989 to 1993) regarding the POW/MIA issue. The United States Department of Defense, headed by Secretary of Defense Dick Cheney, was accused of covering up information and failing to properly pursue intelligence about U.S. POW/MIAs.

Ranking minority member on the Senate Foreign Relations Committee, Senator Jesse Helms of North Carolina, became interested in the matter. In October 1990 his chief staff aide, James P. Lucier, prepared a report stating that it was probable there were live POWs still being held and that the Bush administration was complicit in hiding the facts. The report also alleged that the Soviet Union had held U.S. prisoners after the end of World War II and more may have been transferred there during the Korean War and the Vietnam War. Helms stated that the "deeper story" was a possible "deliberate effort by certain people in the government to disregard all information or reports about living MIA-POWs". This allegation was followed in May 1991 by Helms' release of a minority report of the Foreign Relations Committee, entitled An Examination of US Policy Toward POW/MIAs, which made similar claims and concluded that "any evidence that suggested an MIA might be alive was uniformly and arbitrarily rejected". The issuance of the report angered other Republicans on the committee, and after charges were made that the report contained errors, innuendo, and unsubstantiated rumors, Helms distanced himself from the POW/MIA issue. (This and other personnel matters led to Helms firing Lucier in January 1992.)

A July 1991 Newsweek cover photograph purported to show three U.S. POWs still being held against their will, which increased general public interest in the issue. However, the photograph turned out to be a hoax. Polls showed that a majority of Americans believed live POWs were indeed still being held captive; a July 1991 Wall Street Journal poll showed 70 percent of Americans believing this, and that three-fourths of them believed the U.S. government was not doing what needed to be done to gain their release.

Interest in the matter intensified in June 1992 when President of the Russian Federation Boris Yeltsin told NBC News in an interview that some Americans captured during the Vietnam War may have been transferred from Hanoi to the Soviet Union: "Our archives have shown that it is true, some of them were transferred to the territory of the former U.S.S.R. and were kept in labor camps. We don't have complete data and can only surmise that some of them may still be alive."

Ross Perot stated that he believed that hundreds of U.S. servicemen were left behind in Southeast Asia at the end of the U.S. involvement in the war, and that government officials were hindering POW/MIA investigations in order to conceal a drug smuggling operation used to finance a secret war in Laos.

Retired United States Army general, former Chairman of the Joint Chiefs of Staff and head of the U.S. POW/MIA delegation in Hanoi, John Vessey, defended administrations' and the military's role in trying to get the Vietnamese to improve their efforts in ascertaining the fate of missing U.S. personnel. Vessey had succeeded in 1988 in convincing the Vietnamese to permit U.S. search teams to operate throughout the country. Vessey categorically rejected the notion of a government conspiracy, saying that he had never seen evidence of one at any time in his military career, and adding that, "American soldiers, sailors, airmen and marines are not conspirators." United States Secretary of Defense Dick Cheney said that Vietnamese cooperation was improved but still needed much more improvement.

For critics and skeptics, the allegations failed to convincingly answer the question as to what reason the Vietnamese (and other neighboring countries) would have to keep living prisoners. They could have been returned post-war, or, being inconvenient witnesses, simply executed. Proponents of the theory often claimed that the prisoners were initially held back as part of a scheme to gain war reparations from the United States, as cheap labor, or both; after the U.S. refused to pay reparations, they then continued to be held so that the Vietnamese, wanting to be accepted and taken seriously by the international community, would not have to admit to what they had done.

== Kerry committee ==
Senator Bob Smith introduced a 1991 resolution to create a Senate Select POW/MIA Committee. Senator and fellow Vietnam War veteran John Kerry was the chair of the committee, and its third key member was Senator and former Vietnam War POW John McCain. Compared to earlier congressional investigations into the POW/MIA issue, this one had a mandate to be more skeptical and ask harder questions of government officials than before. The committee's work included more visits to Vietnam and getting the Department of Defense to declassify over a million pages of relevant documents. Kerry and McCain said that they had gotten the Vietnamese to give them full access to their records, and that they had spent thousands of hours trying to find real, not fabricated, evidence of surviving Americans.

Some of the most publicized testimony before the committee came in September 1992, when former Nixon Defense Secretaries Melvin Laird and James Schlesinger said that the U.S. government had believed in 1973 that some U.S. servicemen had not been returned from Laos, despite Nixon's public statements to the contrary. Schlesinger said, "As of now, I can come to no other conclusion. [But] that does not mean there are any alive today." Laird said in retrospect of Nixon's assurances that all POWs were coming home, "I think it was unfortunate to be that positive. You can't be that positive when we had the kind of intelligence we had." In reaction to the testimony, Kerry said, "I think it's quite extraordinary when two former secretaries of defense both give evidence documenting that they had information, or they believed personally, that people were alive and not accounted for in Operation Homecoming."

The committee issued its unanimous findings on January 13, 1993. In response to the central question of whether any U.S. POWs were still in captivity, it stated:

While the Committee has some evidence suggesting the possibility that a POW may have survived to the present, and while some information remains yet to be investigated, there is, at this time, no compelling evidence that proves that any American remains alive in captivity in Southeast Asia.

With specific regard to the "some evidence", the committee said this: "But neither live-sighting reports nor other sources of intelligence have provided grounds for encouragement,[12] particularly over the past decade. The live-sighting reports that have been resolved have not checked out; alleged pictures of POWs have proven false; purported leads have come up empty; and photographic intelligence has been inconclusive, at best." Two senators, Smith and Chuck Grassley, dissented at note 12, with the report saying "they believe that live-sighting reports and other sources of intelligence are evidence that POWs may have survived to the present."

Concerning the possibility that American POWs survived in Southeast Asia after Operation Homecoming, the committee said this: "We acknowledge that there is no proof that U.S. POWs survived, but neither is there proof that all of those who did not return had died. There is evidence, moreover, that indicates the possibility of survival, at least for a small number, after Operation Homecoming."

Committee vice-chairman Smith seemed to back away from the committee's findings within months of their being issued, appearing in April 1993 on Larry King Live with POW/MIA activist Bill Hendon, stressing his partial dissent from the majority report and touting new evidence of North Vietnam having held back prisoners in 1973, and then in the Senate in September 1993, saying he had "very compelling" new evidence of live prisoners. He also asked the Justice Department to investigate ten federal officials for perjury and other crimes in conjunction with a cover-up of POW/MIA investigations, In what he dubbed "Operation Clean Sweep", Smith said the targeted officials had a "mind-set to debunk". Kerry and McCain both denounced Smith's actions, with McCain saying, "In my dealings with these people, it is clear that mistakes may have been made in a very complex set of issues. But at no time was there any indication that they were giving anything but their most dedicated efforts. I frankly don't feel it's appropriate to publicly make these charges without public substantiation." Defense Secretary Les Aspin said the charges were unwarranted.

In 1994, journalist Sydney Schanberg, who had won a Pulitzer Prize in the 1970s for his New York Times reporting in Cambodia, wrote a long article for Penthouse magazine in which he said the committee had been dominated by a faction led by Kerry that "wanted to appear to be probing the prisoner issue energetically, but in fact, they never rocked official Washington's boat, nor did they lay open the 20 years of secrecy and untruths." Schanberg stated that key committee staff had had too close a relationship with the Department of Defense, and that while other committee investigators were able to get evidence of men left behind into the full body of the report, the report's conclusions "were watered down and muddied to the point of meaninglessness." He alleged that government officials never seriously investigated reports of live POWs due to fear of public outrage and damage to their reputations and careers if any had been found and that they were afraid of embarrassment and another hostage crisis similar to the Iran hostage crisis that had helped end the Carter administration. Kerry denied that the committee had engaged in any cover-up.

The Kerry committee did little to soften the attitudes of those directly involved in the issue. To skeptics, "live prisoners" remained a conspiracy theory unsupported by motivation or evidence, and the foundation for a cottage industry of charlatans who preyed upon the hopes of the families of the missing. As two skeptics wrote in 1995, "The conspiracy myth surrounding the Americans who remained missing after Operation Homecoming in 1973 had evolved to baroque intricacy. By 1992, there were thousands of zealots—who believed with cultlike fervor that hundreds of American POWs had been deliberately and callously abandoned in Indochina after the war, that there was a vast conspiracy within the armed forces and the executive branch—spanning five administrations—to cover up all evidence of this betrayal, and that the governments of Communist Vietnam and Laos continued to hold an unspecified number of living American POWs, despite their adamant denials of this charge." Believers continued to strongly reject such notions; as Schanberg wrote in 1994, "It is not conspiracy theory, not paranoid myth, not Rambo fantasy. It is only hard evidence of a national disgrace: American prisoners were left behind at the end of the Vietnam War. They were abandoned because six presidents and official Washington could not admit their guilty secret. They were forgotten because the press and most Americans turned away from all things that reminded them of Vietnam."

== Normalization with Vietnam ==
The actions of the committee were designed to allow for improved ties between the United States and Vietnam, for which the unresolved fate of U.S. MIAs had long been a sticking point. By the mid-1990s, the belief by Americans from a few years earlier that live prisoners still existed had mostly passed; in the words of Time magazine, "most people seemed resigned to the idea that the fortunes of war are bound to leave a few mysteries." In 1994 the Senate passed a resolution, sponsored by Kerry and McCain, that called for an end to the existing trade embargo against Vietnam; it was intended to pave the way for normalization.

When President Bill Clinton lifted the trade embargo on February 3, 1994, he stated:

I have made the judgment that the best way to ensure cooperation from Vietnam and to continue getting the information Americans want on POWs and MIAs is to end the trade embargo. I've also decided to establish a liaison office in Vietnam to provide services for Americans there and help us to pursue a human rights dialogue with the Vietnamese government. I want to be clear; These actions do not constitute a normalization of our relationships. Before that happens, we must have more progress, more cooperation and more answers. Toward that end, this spring I will send another high-level U.S. delegation to Vietnam to continue the search for remains and for documents.

In response, newscaster and columnist Dan Rather wrote the following:

In an obvious attempt to blunt criticism, President Clinton actually characterized lifting the embargo as creating the best opportunity to get the true story of what happened to America's missing. This was especially ill-advised. Because it was obvious that lifting the embargo wasn't designed to resolve doubts about the fate of the missing. It was designed to make money. It was a trade initiative, plain and simple. The people least likely to mistake it for anything else were the families of America's missing.

In 1995, President Bill Clinton normalized diplomatic relations with the country of Vietnam, with McCain's and Kerry's visible support during the announcement giving Clinton, who came of age during Vietnam but did not serve in the military, some political cover.

During his time on the committee and afterward, McCain was vilified as a fraud, traitor, or "Manchurian Candidate" by many of the POW/MIA activists who believed in live prisoners. McCain's high-profile on the Vietnam issue also cost him the friendship of some fellow former POWs; In return, McCain continued to attack those he saw as profiteers exploiting the families of those missing in action, including against his former POWs friends turned rivals.

In the 1990s, the Joint Task Force–Full Accounting in conjunction with the Joint POW/MIA Accounting Command was established to focus on achieving the fullest possible accounting of Americans missing from the Vietnam War. It has interviewed thousands of witnesses regarding the fate of missing Americans, and conducts ten missions per year in Southeast Asia to search for remains of those still listed as missing.

== Diminished in impact but not gone ==
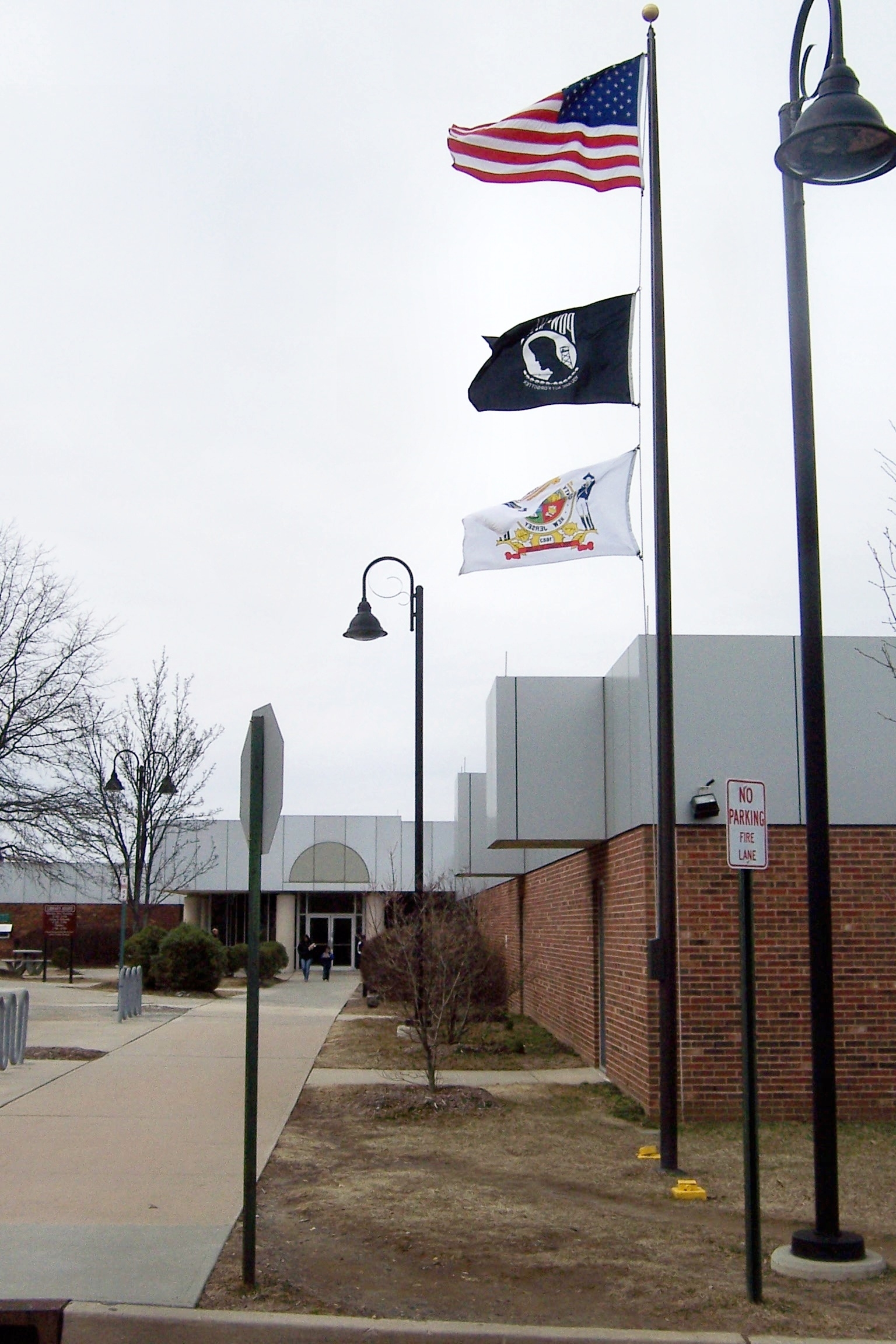
By the late 2000s, the Vietnam POW/MIA issue had largely faded from view, but the U.S. public still saw the POW/MIA Flag flying at many public facilities.

During the twenty-first century, the Vietnam POW/MIA issue became less in the public eye, but did not disappear. As one National Public Radio report said, "The POW/MIA movement isn't the cultural and political force that it once was, but it's still hard to ignore. The iconic black-and-white POW/MIA flag is seemingly everywhere ..."

In a 2002 interview, the Cambodia politician Pen Sovan reported hearing about U.S. POWs from his guards during his imprisonment in Vietnam, and believed that some had been taken by the Soviet Union. He said he had spoken to U.S. MIA officials about this.

Schanberg returned to the POW/MIA subject during John Kerry's 2004 presidential campaign in a series of articles for The Village Voice; he claimed that Kerry had shredded documents, suppressed testimony, and sanitized findings during his time as chairman of the committee. Kerry denied these allegations and responded overall by saying, "In the end, I think what we can take pride in is that we put together the most significant, most thorough, most exhaustive accounting for missing and former POWs in the history of human warfare."

In 2007, the former Congressman Bill Hendon published his book An Enormous Crime, which chronicled his view of the history of U.S. service members abandoned in Southeast Asia following the war and the circumstances that left them there. A companion website allowed readers to examine actual intelligence reports and decide if the Defense Intelligence Agency acted properly in dismissing each case. The book ranked to #34 on the New York Times Best Seller list.

A year later, Schanberg again published articles, this time for The Nation and The Nation Institute, during John McCain's 2008 presidential campaign, in which he recapped his previous arguments and additionally claimed that McCain had helped cover up the long suppression of evidence concerning live prisoners. Former Congressman LeBoutillier was also vocal in his opposition to McCain, in part due to McCain's failure to acknowledge what he saw as evidence of live U.S. POWs left behind. However, while the group of activists on the topic still felt very strongly about it, the matter had largely faded from the U.S. public, and McCain's actions with regard to the POW/MIA issue never were never mentioned as a serious factor in his eventually losing campaign.

The controversy continued to pop up on occasion in the 2010s. The Canadian documentary Unclaimed told in 2013 the story of an elderly man in Vietnam claiming to be a U.S. soldier thought killed in action in 1968. However, Defense Department officials said the man was an imposter with a history of impersonating U.S. POWs. The case of Baron 52, the call sign of a U.S. Air Force EC-47 carrying eight crew members that was shot down over Laos in 1973, was reopened for examination by the Air Force and the Defense POW/MIA Accounting Agency in 2016, after decades of pressure from family members who believe that four of the crewmen might have escaped the crash.

== Continued accounting ==
Efforts continue to recover Americans; the U.S. Department of Defense spends over $110 million per year in the effort, and the number unaccounted for gradually decreases. For instance, according to the Defense POW/MIA Accounting Agency, the number of U.S. military and civilian personnel unaccounted for from the Vietnam War was 1,621 as of March 23, 2016, 1,592 by December 21, 2018,, 1,587 by February 7, 2020 and 1,576 by 12 May 2024.

Working jointly, U.S. and Vietnamese experts focus on "Last Known Alive" cases, which involve missing Americans whom the United States believed might have survived their initial loss incident. Outcomes of these investigations help resolve the live prisoners question.

The United States has identified 296 individuals as Last Known Alive cases in all of Southeast Asia, and following full investigations, the Defense Department had confirmed the wartime death of 245 of these individuals by March 2012.

One important result of the movement was that greater pressure was put by family members on the U.S. government towards recovering and identifying the missing from other past conflicts, some of which had seen far greater numbers of missing in action. Indeed, the majority of the some 150 new identifications made each year are from the Korean War or World War II. As historian Michael Allen has said, "This [pressure] result[ed] in renewed efforts to recover the missing from earlier conflicts, and that effort has over time become institutionalized, so that it's ongoing. It's just part of the military bureaucracy."

== See also ==
- List of United States servicemembers and civilians missing in action during the Vietnam War (1961–65)
- List of United States servicemembers and civilians missing in action during the Vietnam War (1966–67)
- List of United States servicemembers and civilians missing in action during the Vietnam War (1968–69)
- List of United States servicemembers and civilians missing in action during the Vietnam War (1970–71)
- List of United States servicemembers and civilians missing in action during the Vietnam War (1972–75)
