= Newt Heisley =

American commercial artist

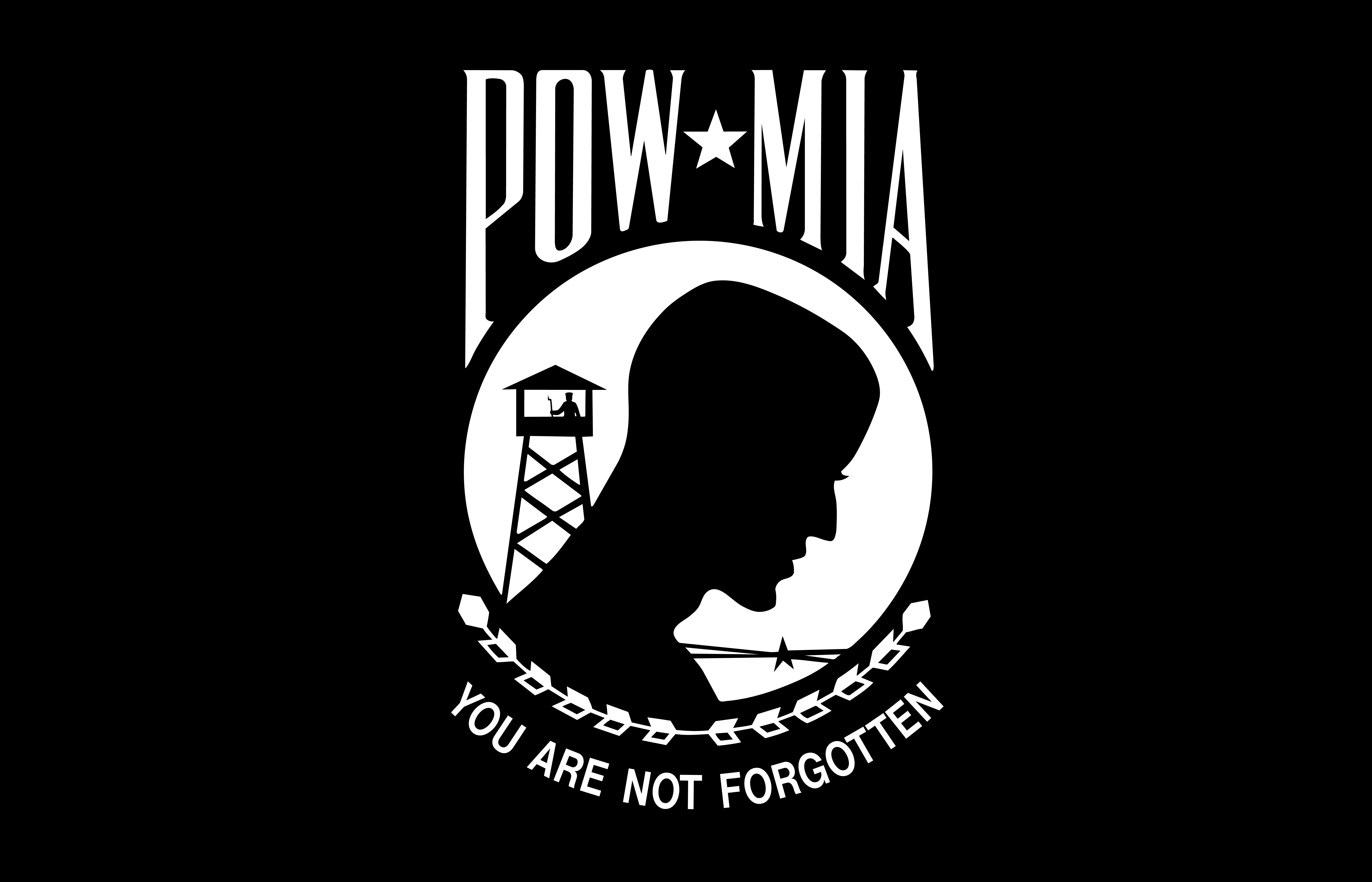
Original POW/MIA flag Newt Heisley designed image

Newton Foust Heisley (November 9, 1920 – May 14, 2009) was an American commercial artist who was responsible for the design of the POW/MIA flag adopted by the National League of Families, and officially recognized by the United States Congress in relation to the Vietnam War POW/MIA issue "as the symbol of our Nation's concern and commitment to resolving as fully as possible the fates of Americans still prisoner, missing and unaccounted for in Southeast Asia, thus ending the uncertainty for their families and the Nation".

== Biography ==
Heisley was born in Williamsport, Pennsylvania, on November 9, 1920. He lived with his grandparents for much of his youth, following the death of his mother when he was four-years old. He attended Syracuse University, graduating with a degree in fine arts, after which he worked as a graphic artist for the Pittsburgh Post-Gazette. He enlisted during World War II, serving as a pilot in the United States Army Air Forces.

=== Graphic design and the POW/MIA flag ===
After the completion of his military service, Heisley spent more than two decades working at advertising firms in the New York City area. In 1971, a New Jersey–based agency he worked for assigned him to create a flag for their client Annin & Company, the largest flag manufacturer in the United States, which had been given the task to create the flag by Mary Hoff, the wife of Lt. Commander Michael Hoff U.S.N., (a service member missing in action) and a member of the National League of Families of American Prisoners and Missing in Southeast Asia.

The image he designed uses black-and-white images of the silhouette of a man in profile with his head bowed in the foreground with a guard tower and barbed wire behind him. Heisley used the image of his son Jeffrey, a 24-year-old member of the United States Marine Corps, who had just returned from basic training where he was preparing to be shipped to Vietnam, returning from his training appearing sickly after a bout of hepatitis. "You Are Not Forgotten", the words that appear on the bottom of the flag, came to Heisley as he recalled his military experience as a pilot flying lengthy missions on C-47 Skytrain transport planes over the South Pacific with the thought coming to his mind that he could end up "being taken prisoner and being... forgotten".

Heisley recalled in 1997 that the flag had only been "intended for a small group" and that "No one realized it was going to get national attention". He had designed the flag selflessly "for the men who were prisoners of war or missing in action. They're the real heroes." He was proud of his efforts in its creation but embarrassed by the notice that arose from his involvement.

In 1988, the POW/MIA flag flew over the White House for the first time and it was installed on permanent display in the rotunda of the United States Capitol in 1989. In 1990, the United States Congress designated the flag Heisley designed as "the symbol of our nation's concern" for soldiers still unaccounted for in Southeast Asia during the Vietnam War, specifying six days each year—Armed Forces Day, Memorial Day, Flag Day, Independence Day, National POW/MIA Recognition Day and Veterans Day—when it is mandated to fly the flag at all military establishments and federal buildings.

He decided to move with his family away from the big city and decided to relocate to Colorado Springs, Colorado, after stopping there one night and seeing the view the next morning. There he opened an advertising firm with his son Jim in 1972. Among the projects his agency worked on was the design of a pin for the 1980 Winter Olympics held in Lake Placid, New York.

=== Personal ===
After years of deteriorating health, Heisley died at age 88 on May 14, 2009, in his home in Colorado Springs, a week before he had planned to marry his fiancée, Donna Allison. He was survived by two sons and a granddaughter.

Heisley's first wife, Bunny, whom he had met while in college, died in 2005.
