= Annin Flagmakers =

American flagmakers

Annin logo

Annin Flagmakers is an American corporation based in Roseland, New Jersey. The flagmaker was founded by Alexander Annin in 1847 and incorporated on January 10, 1910. Annin Flagmakers produces American flags, state flags and national flags of all United Nations members. Annin is a wholesaler that sells through a network of independent dealers and through mass market retailing chains. Annin is a private company owned by the Beard and Dennis families. While sales are not reported, industry estimates are between 75 million and 100 million dollars annually for Annin & Co.

== History ==
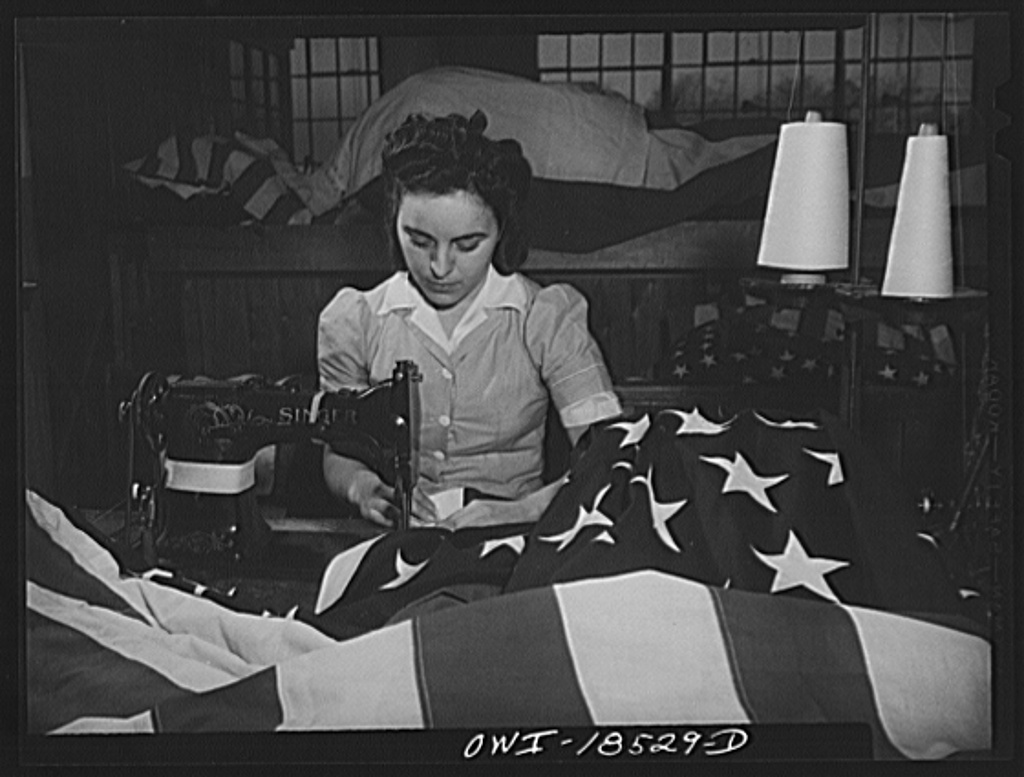
Sewing the edge of an American flag at the Annin Flag Company in Verona, New Jersey (March 1943)

Founded in 1847 by Alexander Annin, the business was previously a ship chandler on Fulton Street, New York City, in the 1820s. Among Alexander Annin's activities was custom making small sails. By 1847, Annin Flagmakers turned to manufacturing all flags and was soon taken over and run by Alexander's two sons, Benjamin and Edward. Located at 99-101 Fulton Street (at the corner of William Street) in Lower Manhattan from 1847 until 1925, the location became known as "Old Glory Corner". Needing more space, Annin opened a location on Fifth Avenue at the corner of 16th Street. The showroom, corporate offices and custom sewing department moved to this space in 1910 and remained until 1960 when the offices moved to New Jersey.

With rising demand for American flags during World War I, Annin built a modern five-story, 34,000 sq ft (3,200 m^{2}) manufacturing building in Verona, New Jersey that opened in 1918 at a cost of $155,655. When a 28,000-square-foot (2,600 m^{2}) addition was completed in 1925, the Fulton Street location was closed. Two months before the closure, a large fire struck Fulton Street, but luckily Annin's location was spared.

One of Annin's early commissions was flags for the inauguration of Zachary Taylor as President of the United States in 1849. In 1850 Annin provided flags for concerts by Swedish singer Jenny Lind displayed on a national tour produced by showman P. T. Barnum. In 1851 Annin made flags for Queen Victoria of Great Britain for the Queen's "Great Exhibit of the Works of Industry of All Nations" in London, considered by historians to be the first World's Fair.

In the 1860s, the U.S. Signal Corps requisitioned all its wartime flags from Annin Flagmakers for the Civil War. An undated newspaper article in Annin's archives from the 1860s states "Without going through forms of contract, Annin supplied the government direct . . . as the war progressed, orders came pouring in from every state and city that was loyal to the Union, so that by the beginning of 1864, there was not a single battlefield, a brigade or a division that did not use Annin flags."

Annin supplied the flags for the inauguration of Abraham Lincoln and the flag that draped his casket as it was taken by train from Washington, D.C., to Illinois.

POW☆MIA Flag as designed by Newt Heisley

Annin Flagmakers records show its flags have participated in world events such as:

- The opening ceremonies of the Brooklyn Bridge in 1883
- Commander Robert E. Peary's arrival at the North Pole in 1909 and Rear Admiral Richard E. Byrd's arrival at the South Pole 21 years later
- The flag raising by US Marines atop Mount Suribachi on Iwo Jima in 1945
- The NASA Apollo space program including the Apollo 11 mission to the moon in 1969
- America's 1976 Bicentennial celebration
- The design in 1971 by Newt Heisley and inception of the POW-MIA flag in 1972 in conjunction with the National League of POW/MIA Families

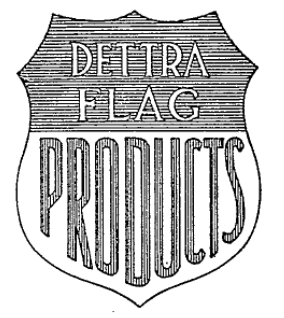
Logo of the Dettra Flag Company

Annin purchased competitive flag companies Colonial Flag Company in Coshocton, Ohio, in 1975 and Dettra Flag Co. in Oaks, Pennsylvania, in 1998. Dettra Flag Co. had been Annin's largest commercial competitor since 1902. In 2010, Annin purchased FlagZone in Gilbertsville, Pennsylvania. FlagZone runs independently from Annin with Dan Ziegler as its president.

== Recent developments ==
In 2001, Annin opened a new 100,000 sq/ft manufacturing and warehousing facility in Coshocton, where flags are manufactured and shipped to US mass merchant retail and hardware chains. A new 50,000 sq ft (4,600 m^{2}). distribution facility was added on in 2004. The addition was built by the W.M. Brode Company of Newcomerstown, Ohio. The project also was completed on-budget and on-time.

In 2003, Annin added a 100,000 sq/ft manufacturing and distribution facility to the existing 80,000 sq ft (7,400 m^{2}). printing facility in South Boston, Virginia, built on-time and on-budget for $2.8 million. In this facility Annin dyes the fabric to make US flags, prints the fabric to make state and foreign flags and stocks and ships orders daily to the Annin network of dealers in all 50 states.

In 2003, Annin went live on SAP ERP software. This system replaced a Qantel MRP system that had been in place since 1986. SAP has allowed Annin to forecast by division, load and plan multiple factories and run MRP across all locations. Financial reporting is improved with segmented reporting by division. Allocation of product at the time of order entry enables accurate inventory reporting and the ability to guarantee product delivery whether ordered over the phone, by fax or through the Annin B2B website.

In 2005, Annin Flagmakers joined with other domestic flag manufacturing companies and became a founding member of the Flag Manufacturers Association of America (FMAA). This industry organization is dedicated to promoting the manufacture of US flags in America.

Starting in 2006, Annin began converting most of the sewing process in its factories to team-based unit production cells. This move away from traditional bundle piece-rate sewing has been progressive and recognized as better for the health of sewing manufacturing employees. The workers stand while sewing which is better for circulation and posture instead of the traditional sitting sewing position. Repetitive motion injuries are also reduced.

In 2006, Annin purchased the D&P Embroidery Company in Cobbs Creek, Virginia, and now can produce most of the embroidered star fields in-house for Annin's US flags.

From 2006 to 2009, Annin installed digital print equipment from Reggiani Machine S.p.a. of Bergamo, Italy. These three machines are capable of printing any design flag (state, foreign or custom) at 110 linear yards/hr with acid inks on nylon fabric or disperse inks on polyester fabric. The traditional hand table method of printing was replaced. High volume printing is still performed on machines from Zimmer Austria.

In 2010, Annin purchased FlagZone in Gilbertsville, Pennsylvania. FlagZone is a full-service wholesaler that sells through a network of independent flag dealers and through mass market retail chains. FlagZone is run independently from Annin Flagmakers with separate manufacturing, distribution and corporate offices. Dan Ziegler is president of FlagZone.

In June 2015, following the events of the Charleston church shooting, Annin announced that it would no longer sell Confederate flags.

== Corporate governance ==
Annin Flagmakers is privately owned by the Beard and Dennis families and managed by a professional management team, including two active sixth-generation family members: Carter Beard, president and CEO, Sandy Dennis Van Lieu, vice president. Annin employs over 500 people.

Members of the board as of 2020 are: Carter Beard (chairman), Carter Lee Beard Sr., Thomas Rogers, Geoffrey Engelstein, Sue Dennis-Tait, Sandra Van Lieu.

Main corporate officers are: Carter Beard (president and CEO)

== Sources ==
https://www.annin.com/wp-content/uploads/2020/04/Our_Flag_Brochure-2d-converted1.pdf

- The New York Times-Business Day Published March 10, 2002, https://www.nytimes.com/2002/03/10/business/update-annin-company-13-stripes-50-stars-800-tired-workers.html?scp=1&sq=&st=nyt
- New York Times March 10, 2002-https://www.nytimes.com/2002/03/10/business/update-annin-company-13-stripes-50-stars-800-tired-workers.html?scp=1&sq=&st=nyt
- NASCAR Article- https://web.archive.org/web/20120305104057/http://hometracks.nascar.com/node/3436
- SAP Article- https://web.archive.org/web/20100520022234/http://www.ciber.com/ciber_overview/stories/search_results_single.cfm?id=annin
- Flag Manufacturers Association of America www.fmaa-usa.com
- Annin September Newsletter www.annin.com/downloads/AnninAdvantage_Sep2006.pdf
- Reggiani Macchine S.p.A. Products www.reggianimacchine.it/English/products_dream_main.htm
