= National League of POW/MIA Families =

American non-profit regarding the Vietnam War

National League of Families of American Prisoners and Missing in Southeast Asia
- Flag
- Established: May 2, 1970 (56 years ago)
- Founder: Sybil Stockdale
- Founded at: Constitution Hall, Washington, D.C.
- Type: 501(c)(3), humanitarian organization
- Tax ID no.: 23-7071242
- Headquarters: 5673 Columbia Pike, Suite 100, Falls Church, Virginia
- Coordinates: 38.851579°N 77.124539°W
- Website: pow-miafamilies.org

The National League of Families of American Prisoners and Missing in Southeast Asia, commonly known as the National League of POW/MIA Families or the League, is an American 501(c)(3) humanitarian organization that is concerned with the Vietnam War POW/MIA issue. According to the group's web site, its sole purpose is "to obtain the release of all prisoners, the fullest possible accounting for the missing and repatriation of all recoverable remains of those who died serving our nation during the Vietnam War in Southeast Asia." The League's most prominent symbol is its flag.

The League's national office, based in Falls Church, Virginia, is run by three full-time employees and various volunteers. To date, 1,575 U.S. servicemen are still listed as Missing in Action in the Vietnam War and efforts continue by certain departments of the U.S. government and the National League of Families to ascertain the fate of these missing service members. Debate continues as to whether or not the efforts by the U.S. government, the Vietnamese government in Hanoi and other governments historically involved in the war have been, or continue to be, sufficient regarding the effort to find these missing soldiers, pilots, airmen and sailors. The National League of Families continues to work at keeping the pressure on both Washington and Hanoi to bring complete resolution to this issue on behalf of each family with a loved one still missing in Vietnam.

== History ==
The National League of POW/MIA Families' origins date to groups created by Sybil Stockdale and a group of POW/MIA wives in 1966 in Coronado, California. Sybil Stockdale's husband, Navy Commander James Stockdale, was shot down in 1965 and she was determined to make the American people aware of the mistreatment of U.S. POWs. Years later Evelyn Grubb became involved because she was frustrated with the lack of information from federal officials. It was these groups that finally convinced the U.S. government to change their official stance on the POW/MIA issue in 1969. The National League of Families was incorporated nationally in 1967 and later in Washington, D.C., on May 28, 1970.

Another notable member of the league during the war was Joe McCain, brother of imprisoned U.S. Navy pilot and future U.S. Senator and presidential candidate John McCain. The league gained increased international attention in 1972 when Life Magazine ran a feature article on the organization. The article started with a full page photograph of Major Wilmer Newlin Grubb of the United States Air Force, the husband of National League of Families President Evelyn Grubb, from after he had been shot down in 1966 and taken prisoner by the North Vietnamese Army. Evelyn Grubb by then was also serving as the League's representative to the White House, the United Nations and the Paris Peace Talks, pressing for better accountability, treatment and the speedy return of American MIA and POW soldiers, pilots, airmen, and sailors in the Vietnam War, as well as better policies related to their families. Grubb did not find out until after the war was over that her husband had died shortly after being shot down.

In the 1980s a different group, the National Alliance Of Families For the Return of America's Missing Servicemen, was formed as a split-off by National League of Families members over a disagreement with then League President Ann Mills Griffith over tactics the organization should employ in pursuing its goals, and disagreements about the status of missing servicemen by the 1980s. Compared to the league, the National Alliance takes a more activist, radical stance, especially with regard to the Vietnam War POW/MIA issue and belief in the existence of "live prisoners" in Southeast Asia.

== Flag ==
Then-League President and POW wife Evelyn Grubb oversaw the development of the now-famous National League of Families' POW/MIA flag in January 1972. The original design for the flag was created by the artist Newt Heisley for Annin Flagmakers in 1971 after Mary Hoff, wife of MIA Lt. Commander Michael Hoff U.S.N., recognized the need for a symbol for American POW/MIAs. Evelyn Grubb was then also a driving force in gaining the flag's adoption by the military, the U.S. Postal Service and other federal service agencies. Eventually the flag became widely popular and adoption of its use began to spread on its own, as the flag became a national symbol of Vietnam war remembrance. The flag, with the now widely recognized "You Are Not Forgotten, POW/MIA" logo is still flown in front of all U.S. post offices, all major U.S. military installations, and most fire stations, police stations, many state level agencies and also most veterans organizations chapters across the United States today, and is almost always present at most local and national veterans events in the United States. The flag is consequently still visible to millions of Americans on a daily basis.

== See also ==
- Defense Prisoner of War/Missing Personnel Office
- Joint POW/MIA Accounting Command
- List of United States servicemembers and civilians missing in action during the Vietnam War (1961–65)
- List of United States servicemembers and civilians missing in action during the Vietnam War (1966–67)
- List of United States servicemembers and civilians missing in action during the Vietnam War (1968–69)
- List of United States servicemembers and civilians missing in action during the Vietnam War (1970–71)
- List of United States servicemembers and civilians missing in action during the Vietnam War (1972–75)
- Vietnam War POW/MIA issue

== Bibliography ==
- Grubb, Evelyn; Jose, Carol (2008). You Are Not Forgotten: A Family's Quest for Truth and The Founding of the National League of Families. Vandemere Press. ISBN 978-0-918339-71-3.
- Keating, Susan Katz (1994). Prisoners of Hope: Exploiting the POW/MIA Myth in America. New York: Random House. ISBN 0-679-43016-4.
- McCain, John; Salter, Mark (1999). Faith of My Fathers. New York: Random House. ISBN 0-375-50191-6.
- McConnell, Malcolm; Theodore G. Schweitzer III (1995). Inside Hanoi's Secret Archives: Solving the MIA Mystery. Simon & Schuster. ISBN 0-671-87118-8.
- Stockdale, Jim; Stockdale, Sybil (1984). In Love and War. Naval Institute Press.
- Lee, Heath Hardage (2020). The League of Wives. St. Martin's Press. ISBN 9781250161109.
