= Sybil Stockdale =

American activist

- Born: Sybil Elizabeth Bailey; November 25, 1924; New Haven, Connecticut, U.S.
- Died: October 10, 2015 (aged 90); Coronado, California, U.S.
- Education: Mount Holyoke College (BA); Stanford University (MEd)
- Occupation: Author
- Known for: National League of Families of American Prisoners and Missing in Southeast Asia
- Title: 1st National Coordinator of the National League of Families of American Prisoners and Missing in Southeast Asia
- Spouse: Vice Admiral James Stockdale (m. 1947; died 2005)
- Children: 4
- Awards: Navy Distinguished Public Service Award

Sybil Elizabeth Stockdale (née Bailey; November 25, 1924 – October 10, 2015) was an American campaigner for families of Americans missing in South East Asia.

Sybil was the founder and first national coordinator of the National League of Families of American Prisoners and Missing in Southeast Asia, a nonprofit organization that worked on behalf of American Vietnam-era Missing in Action and Prisoner of War Families. In her capacity as national coordinator for the League, she also served as its liaison to the White House and the Department of Defense. She was the wife of Vietnam War United States Navy pilot James Stockdale who became a prisoner of war (POW).

Stockdale is credited with helping to publicize the mistreatment of U.S. prisoners by North Vietnam and for helping to improve American policies concerning the treatment and handling of POW families. Stockdale is the recipient of the Navy Distinguished Public Service Award, the highest award given by the Department of the Navy to a citizen not employed by the Department. She is the only wife of an active-duty officer ever to have been so honored.

Stockdale and her husband wrote the book In Love and War: the Story of a Family's Ordeal and Sacrifice During the Vietnam War (1984).

Her husband, James Stockdale, was a recipient of the Medal of Honor for bravery in war, and after his release at the end of the war, was eventually promoted to vice admiral and by the time of his death in 2005 was one of the United States' most honored and decorated military veterans in the post-World War II era. He was present at the August 4, 1964 Gulf of Tonkin Incident, spent 7 1/2 years under torture as a POW in North Vietnam, later became President of The Citadel, and eventually ran for Vice-President of the United States with Ross Perot heading the ticket.

== Early life and education ==
Sybil Elizabeth Bailey was born in New Haven, Connecticut. She held an undergraduate degree from Mount Holyoke College, and a master's degree in education from Stanford University. Jim and Sybil Stockdale had four sons: Jim, Sid, Stanford and Taylor.

== The League ==
When Stockdale's husband James was shot down in 1965 over North Vietnam, the U.S. government had a "keep-quiet" policy, asking relatives of POWs to not raise a fuss about mistreatment of prisoners. The official reason was not that the prisoners were not being tortured, but that bad publicity might result in worse treatment. After a year of abiding by the government "keep-quiet" policy, Sybil found herself more and more disenchanted with the pretense that prisoners like her husband were treated fairly; James had been tortured, had inflicted serious wounds on himself to convince his captors they could not break or use him, and had spent time in solitary confinement.

In summer 1966, Sybil along with other members of a San Diego POW and MIA support group decided to go national, and formed the National League of Families of American Prisoners and Missing in Southeast Asia. Sybil was the first national coordinator. Other support groups from east coast military communities later became part of the National League. Within a year she was sitting in the office of the Secretary of Defense Melvin Laird discussing policy. The Nixon Administration had ended the "keep quiet" policy and allegations of torture of U.S. prisoners became fully public, with Sybil a forceful spokeswoman. In 1970, Stockdale, along with her husband's 1992 running mate, H. Ross Perot, testified before the U.S. House of Representatives' Committee on Foreign Affairs.

== Later life ==
On May 10, 2008, Sybil Stockdale attended a christening ceremony at Bath Iron Works in Bath, Maine, for USS Stockdale, the 30th Arleigh Burke-class destroyer, and the 56th ship of the class. Four Medal of Honor recipients and seven former prisoners of war attended the ceremony that marked a milestone in construction of the 9,200-ton ship named for her late husband. She died at SHARP Hospital in Coronado, California on October 10, 2015, from Parkinson's disease, at the age of 90.

== Works ==
Sybil Stockdale co-wrote a memoir with her husband James (who also wrote a number of books on his own). In Love and War: the Story of a Family's Ordeal and Sacrifice During the Vietnam War was the most popular book written by either of the Stockdales. In the book James and Sybil Stockdale wrote alternating chapters describing their experiences of the Vietnam war. James wrote of his experiences as a POW, and Sybil wrote of her experiences as the wife of a POW, dealing with the stress and waiting at home and her journey cutting through Washington red tape and publicizing the plight of American POWs in Vietnam. NBC adapted the book into a made-for-television movie that had 45 million viewers.
