= List of Playboy interviews =

The Playboy interview became a regular feature of the magazine in 1962 and set a high standard for periodical journalism. AP News called the feature "models of the art form", stating that "Playboy's long and searching conservations are remarkable for the people who spoke to the magazine and for what they said." Booklist called the Playboy interview "the gold standard for in-depth discussion with leading cultural figures".

The conversations with artists, athletes, business leaders, and political figures have been referenced by mainstream publications such as AP News, Billboard, CNN, Los Angeles Times, The Paris Review, Slate, Time, Variety, Vice, and The Washington Post as a benchmark for in-depth interviews. Publishers Weekly commented on the feature's ability to go further than a normal magazine interview: "Since the interviews have no length restriction, interviewers are able to probe deep into their subjects and allow them to ramble expansively."

The Los Angeles Times described the subjects as coming from "all across the cultural spectrum: entertainment, politics, literature", calling them "open-ended, sprawling, a kind of 'Charlie Rose Show' of the printed page", and Playboy's format served as inspiration for Rolling Stone editor Jann Wenner when he designed his own magazine's approach to interviews.

The Playboy interview with candidate Jimmy Carter is regarded by many to have influenced the 1976 presidential election, and the interview with John Lennon before his death (later published as a standalone book) is referenced in several retrospective articles by other media. Playboy's interview with pop singer Azealia Banks generated controversy due to her forthright critique of the American public.

Selected interviews have been published as mass-market collections, including The Playboy Interview (1981) and The Playboy Interview Volume II (1983). In 1992, a large-format book The Playboy Interview: The Best Of Three Decades 1962-1992, was released with a foreword by CBS journalist Mike Wallace.

Dark Horse published five collections of the interviews from 2006 to 2008: "The Comedians", "Movers and Shakers" (business), "The Directors", "Larger Than Life" (high-profile celebrities), and "They Played The Game" (sports). In a review of this series, the Directors Guild of America said, "The Playboy face-to-face encounter is remarkable", and "the lengthy, in-depth interviews are well researched and more penetrating than standard-issue media chatter."

The following people have been featured in Playboy magazine as the subject of the full-length interview or the 20Q (Twenty Questions) section.

== 1960–1969 ==
		January	February	March	April	May	June	July	August	September	October	November	December
1962	Interview	"Playboy Interview" begins September 1962:								Miles Davis	(none)	(none)	Jackie Gleason
1963	Interview	(none)	Frank Sinatra	Bertrand Russell	Helen Gurley Brown	Malcolm X	Billy Wilder	(none)	(none)	Richard Burton	James Hoffa	Albert Schweitzer	
1964	Interview	Vladimir Nabokov	(none)	Ayn Rand	Jean Genet	(none)	Ingmar Bergman	Salvador Dalí	Dick Gregory	Henry Miller	Cassius Clay	George Wallace	Ian Fleming
1965	Interview	Martin Luther King	The Beatles	(none)	Art Buchwald	Jean-Paul Sartre	Melvin Belli	Marcello Mastroianni	Robert Shelton	Peter O'Toole	Madalyn Murray	Sean Connery	Al Capp
1966	Interview	Princess Grace	Federico Fellini	Bob Dylan	George Lincoln Rockwell	Arthur Schlesinger, Jr.	Mike Nichols	Ralph Ginzburg	H. L. Hunt	Timothy Leary	Mel Brooks	Norman Thomas	Sammy Davis Jr.
1967	Interview	Fidel Castro	Mark Lane	Orson Welles	Arnold Toynbee	Woody Allen	(none)	Michael Caine	F. Lee Bailey	John V. Lindsay	Jim Garrison	Michelangelo Antonioni	Johnny Carson
1968	Interview	Norman Mailer	Jim Brown	Truman Capote	Charles Percy	Masters and Johnson	John Kenneth Galbraith	Paul Newman	(none)	Stanley Kubrick	Ralph Nader	Don Rickles	(none)
1969	Interview	Martin Luther King Jr.	Mort Sahl	Marshall McLuhan	Allen Ginsberg	Bill Cosby	Gore Vidal	Rod Steiger	Ramsey Clark	(none)	Rowan and Martin	Jesse Jackson	Joe Namath

== 1970–1979 ==
		January	February	March	April	May	June	July	August	September	October	November	December
1970	Interview	Raquel Welch	(none)	Ray Charles	Mary Calderone	William F. Buckley Jr.	Tiny Tim	Joan Baez	Paul R. Ehrlich	Peter Fonda	William Kunstler	Elliott Gould	Robert Graves
1971	Interview	(none)	Tom Murton	Dick Cavett	(none)	John Wayne	Albert Speer	John Cassavetes	George McGovern	Jules Feiffer	Charles Evers	Allen Klein	Roman Polanski
1972	Interview	Germaine Greer	R. Buckminster Fuller	Saul Alinsky	Jack Nicholson	Howard Cosell	Jackie Stewart	Anthony Herbert	Sam Peckinpah	Bernadette Devlin	Meir Kahane	Jack Anderson	Yevgeny Yevtushenko
1973	Interview	Carroll O'Connor	Milton Friedman	Joe Frazier	Tennessee Williams	Huey Newton	Walter Cronkite	Kurt Vonnegut Jr.	David Halberstam	(none)	Pete Rozelle	James Dickey	Bob Hope
1974	Interview	Hugh Hefner	Clint Eastwood	Groucho Marx	Jane Fonda, Tom Hayden	Henry Aaron	Elmo Zumwalt	Barry Commoner	Erich von Däniken	Anthony Burgess	Al Goldstein	Hunter Thompson	Robert Redford
1975	Interview	John Dean	Mel Brooks	Billie Jean King	Dustin Hoffman	William E. Simon	Joseph Heller	Francis Ford Coppola	Philip Agee	Erica Jong	Cher	Muhammad Ali	Jimmy Hoffa
1976	Interview	Elton John	James Caan	Norman Lear	Jerry Brown	Abbie Hoffman	Sara Jane Moore	Karl Hess	Robert Altman	David Bowie	Roone Arledge	Jimmy Carter	O. J. Simpson
1977	Interview	Alex Haley	Keith Stroup	Pat Moynihan	Gary Gilmore	Cast of Saturday Night Live	Robert Blake	Andrew Young	Henry Winkler	James Earl Ray	Barbra Streisand	Henry Kyemba	John Denver
1978	Interview	Playboy Panel: UFOs	Don Meredith	Bob Dylan	David Frost	Anita Bryant	George Burns	William Colby	Ted Turner	Sylvester Stallone	Dolly Parton	Geraldo Rivera	John Travolta
1978	20Q	"20Q" begins October 1978:									Cheryl Tiegs	(none)	(none)
1979	Interview	Marlon Brando	Neil Simon	Ted Patrick	Malcolm Forbes	Wendy Carlos	Dennis Kucinich	Joseph Wambaugh	Edward Teller	Pete Rose	Burt Reynolds	Masters and Johnson	Al Pacino
1979	20Q	(none)	(none)	(none)	(none)	Dan Rather	(none)	(none)	Frank Langella	(none)	(none)	(none)	(none)

== 1980–1989 ==
		January	February	March	April	May	June	July	August	September	October	November	December
1980	Interview	Steve Martin	Patrick Caddell	Terry Bradshaw	Linda Rondstat	Gay Talese	John Anderson	Bruce Jenner	William Shockley	Roy Scheider	G. Gordon Liddy	Larry Hagman	George C. Scott
1980	20Q	(none)	(none)	Shelley Hack	(none)	(none)	(none)	George Hamilton	(none)	(none)	(none)	Michael Douglas	Truman Capote
1981	Interview	John Lennon / Yoko Ono	Tom Snyder	James Garner	Ed Asner	Elisabeth Kubler-Ross	Steve Garvey	Robert Garwood	George Gilder	James Michener	Donald Sutherland	Oriana Fallaci	Henry Fonda
1981	20Q	(none)	(none)	Lauren Hutton	(none)	John DeLorean	Jack Lemmon	(none)	Joan Rivers	(none)	(none)	(none)	John Kenneth Galbraith
1982	Interview	George Carlin	Lech Walesa	Patricia Hearst	Edward Koch	Billy Joel	Sugar Ray Leonard	Bette Davis	Akio Morita	Cheech and Chong	Robin Williams	Luciano Pavorotti	Julie Andrews, Blake Edwards
1982	20Q	John Matuszak	Karen Allen	Louis Rukeyser	James Woods	SCTV	Brandon Tartikoff	Stevie Nicks	Mariette Hartley	Tom Petty	John Le Boutillier	Frank and Moon Unit Zappa	(none)
1983	Interview	Dudley Moore	Gabriel García Márquez	Sam Donaldson	Paul Newman	Ansel Adams	Stephen King	Earl Weaver	Ted Turner	The Sandinistas, Daniel Ortega	Cast of Hill Street Blues	Kenny Rogers	Tom Selleck
1983	20Q	Herschel Walker	Yakov Smirnoff	Arthur Jones	Al McGuire	Charlton Heston	Debra Winger	Carrie Fisher	Jan Stephenson	Randy Newman	Joe Piscopo	Bubba Smith	(none)
1984	Interview	Dan Rather	Paul Simon	Moses Malone	Joan Collins	Calvin Klein	Jesse Jackson	Walid Jumblatt	Bobby Knight	Shirley MacLaine	David Letterman	José Napoleón Duarte	Paul and Linda McCartney
1984	20Q	(none)	Shelley Long	(none)	Martin Mull	(none)	Siskel and Ebert	Fran Lebowitz	Kurt Russell	(none)	Jack LaLanne	Leigh Steinberg	(none)
1985	Interview	Goldie Hawn	Steve Jobs	Cast of 60 Minutes	Wayne Gretzky	Boy George	Sparky Anderson	Rob Reiner	Fidel Castro	John Huston	John DeLorean	Sting	Bill Cosby
1985	20Q	Diane Lane	Brian De Palma	Bob Giraldi	Joel Hyatt	Marvin Hagler, Thomas Hearns	Tom Watson	Jamie Lee Curtis	Ron Howard	Billy Crystal	Rosanna Arquette	Don Johnson, Philip Michael Thomas	Huey Lewis
1986	Interview	Ruth Westheimer	Michael Douglas	Sally Field	Jeffrey MacDonald	Kathleen Turner	Kareem Abdul-Jabbar	Arthur C. Clarke	Jackie Gleason	Carl Bernstein	Phil Collins	Joan Rivers	Bryant Gumbel
1986	20Q	Jay Leno	Anthony Pellicano	David Byrne	(none)	Kim Basinger	Al Unser, Sr., Al Unser, Jr.	Tom Cruise	Sigourney Weaver	Gregory Hines	Jim McMahon	David Horowitz	Koko
1987	Interview	Don Johnson	Mickey Rourke	Lionel Richie	Louis Rukeyser	Prince Norodom Sihanouk	Whoopi Goldberg	Wade Boggs	Imelda and Ferdinand Marcos	John Sculley	General Richard Secord	Daniel Ortega	Gore Vidal
1987	20Q	Max Headroom	Ed Begley Jr.	Bob Vila	Rae Dawn Chong	Barbara Hershey	Michael J. Fox	Garry Shandling	David Lee Roth	Penn And Teller	Bob Uecker	Kelly McGillis	Justine Bateman
1988	Interview	Arnold Schwarzenegger	Oliver Stone	Billy Crystal	Tom Clancy	Don King	Chevy Chase	Paul Hogan	Harvey Fierstein	Yasser Arafat	Roger Craig	Bruce Willis	Cher
1988	20Q	Susan Dey	Harold Washington	Tom Waits	Harrison Ford	Teri Garr	Theresa Russell	Judge Reinhold	Harry Edwards	Tracey Ullman	Morton Downey Jr.	John Cleese	Gene Simmons
1989	Interview	Robert De Niro	Bob Woodward	Tom Hanks	The I.R.A.	Susan Sarandon	Edward James Olmos	Barry Diller	John Cougar Mellencamp	Keith Hernandez	Keith Richards	Garry Kasparov	Candice Bergen
1989	20Q	(none)	Andrea Marcovicci	Fred Dryer	Mario Lemieux	Richard Lewis	Nicolas Cage	William Shatner	John Candy	Jeff Daniels	Geena Davis	Bonnie Raitt	Patti D'Arbanville

== 1990–1999 ==
		January	February	March	April	May	June	July	August	September	October	November	December
1990	Interview	Tom Cruise	Eddie Murphy	Donald Trump	Stephen Hawking	Dave Barry	Cast of thirtysomething	Quincy Jones	Larry King	Rickey Henderson	Shintaro Ishihara	Leona Helmsley	Jay Leno
1990	20Q	Andrew Dice Clay	Dwight Yoakam	Dennis Hopper	John Larroquette	Jennifer Tilly	Willy T. Ribbs	Matt Groening	Dana Carvey	Maury Povich	Kiefer Sutherland	Chuck D	Elizabeth Perkins
1991	Interview	Lee Iacocca	Gene Siskel, Roger Ebert	M. Scott Peck	Martin Scorsese	George Steinbrenner	Robert MacNeil and Jim Lehrer	Spike Lee	Daryl Gates	Douglas Wilder	Robert Maxwell	Sean Penn	Carl Sagan
1991	20Q	(none)	Lena Olin	(none)	George Foreman	Whitney Houston	John Milius	Eric Bogosian	Robert Downey Jr.	Danny Glover	Camille Paglia	Julia Roberts	Joe Pesci
1992	Interview	Robin Williams	Liz Smith	Lorne Michaels	Jonathan Kozol	Michael Jordan	Ralph Nader	Michael Keaton	Derek Humphry	Betty Friedan	Sister Souljah	William Safire	Sharon Stone
1992	20Q	Woody Harrelson	Jennifer Jason Leigh	Forest Whitaker	Bobcat Goldthwait	John Leguizamo	Patrick Swayze	Nicole Kidman	Catherine Crier	Dennis Miller	Tim Robbins	Patrick Stewart	Helmut Newton
1993	Interview	Steve Martin	Danny DeVito	Anne Rice	Frank Zappa	Charles Barkley	Roseanne & Tom Arnold	Barry Bonds	Dan Aykroyd	Larry Kramer	Jerry Seinfeld	Joyce Carol Oates	Rush Limbaugh
1993	20Q	Sean Young	Tim Allen	Laura Dern	Cindy Crawford	Giorgio Armani	Rebecca De Mornay	Rip Torn	Scott Turow	Sarah Jessica Parker	Wesley Snipes	Brian Dennehy	Branford Marsalis
1994	Interview	David Letterman	Pete Townshend	Anthony Hopkins	Howard Stern	Ron Howard	Garth Brooks	Bill Gates	Deion Sanders	David Geffen	Jerry Jones	Christian Slater	Garry Shandling
1994	20Q	Shaquille O'Neal	Chris Berman	Halle Berry	Laurence Fishburne	Denis Leary	Fred Ward	Michael Moriarty	Dana Delany	David Caruso	Heather Locklear	Quentin Tarantino	Kelsey Grammer
1995	Interview	Jean-Claude Van Damme	Tim Robbins	Vladimir Zhirinovsky	David Mamet	Camille Paglia	Joycelyn Elders	Mel Gibson	Berry Gordy	Cindy Crawford	Snoop Dogg	Harvey Keitel	George Foreman
1995	20Q	Tom Snyder	David Spade	Jon Stewart	Samuel L. Jackson	David Hasselhoff	Tom Arnold	Kurt Loder	Dawn Steel	Sandra Bullock	Bill Maher	G. Gordon Liddy	Dominick Dunne
1996	Interview	Johnny Depp	Bruce Willis	John Travolta	Salman Rushdie	Ray Bradbury	Dennis Miller	James Carville	Shaquille O'Neal	Nicolas Cage	Jay Leno	Liam Neeson	Mike Wallace
1996	20Q	Robin Quivers	Harry Wu	Dick Vitale	Michael Madsen	Lou Dobbs	Julia Louis-Dreyfus	Chazz Palminteri	Heidi Fleiss	Janeane Garofalo	Jimmy Smits	Chris O'Donnell	Lisa Kudrow
1997	Interview	Whoopi Goldberg	Lawrence Schiller	Clint Eastwood	Vincent Bugliosi	Saul Bellow	Dennis Rodman	Anthony Edwards	Bill Maher	Christopher Walken	Tommy Hilfiger	Brett Favre	Robert Downey Jr.
1997	20Q	Mike Judge	Conan O'Brien	Michael Jordan	Vanessa Williams	Lucy Lawless	Julianna Margulies	Jon Lovitz	Norm Macdonald	Chris Farley	Téa Leoni	Robert Wuhl	Chris Rock
1998	Interview	Grant Hill	Conan O'Brien	Kevin Kline	Joe Eszterhas	Scott Adams	Paul Reiser	Jerry Springer	Matt Drudge	Daniel Patrick Moynahan	Geraldo Rivera	Mike Tyson	David Duchovny
1998	20Q	Teri Hatcher	Paul Thomas Anderson	John Peterman	Keith Olbermann	Ben Stiller	Yasir Arafat	Craig Kilborn	Bruce Willis	Kevin Williamson	Tori Spelling	Drew Pinsky	Gore Vidal
1999	Interview	Michael Crichton	Emeril Lagasse	Drew Carey	Nick Nolte	David Spade	Samuel L. Jackson	Barney Frank	Albert Brooks	Chris Rock	Kevin Spacey	Jesse Ventura	Ben Affleck
1999	20Q	Kirstie Alley	The Motley Fool	Gerry Adams	David Schwimmer	Ashley Judd	Christina Applegate	Michael Moore	Lucy Liu	Jeri Ryan	Joe Morgan	George Jones	Gina Gershon

== 2000–2009 ==
		January	February	March	April	May	June	July	August	September	October	November	December
2000	Interview	Hugh Hefner	Jeff Bezos	Jon Stewart	Rowland Evans, Robert Novak	Pete Rose	Trey Parker, Matt Stone	George Clooney	John Malkovich	Jennifer Lopez	Bob Costas	Ben Stiller	Drew Barrymore
2000	20Q	Rupert Everett	Steven Van Zandt	Cindy Margolis	Barry White	Michael Palin	James Coburn	Carson Daly	Aimee Mann	Seth Green	Michael Johnson	Neil LaBute	Jakob Dylan
2001	Interview	Gary Johnson	Vince McMahon	Bobby Knight	Metallica	Tom Green	Charlie Sheen	Chris Matthews	Tim Burton	Dale Earnhardt Jr.	Cast of The West Wing	The Coen Brothers	Will Smith
2001	20Q	Carol Alt	Sela Ward	Traci Lords	Wyclef Jean	Mariska Hargitay	Edward Burns	Johnny Knoxville	Jon Bon Jovi	Stanley Tucci	Marg Helgenberger	Will Ferrell	Catherine Bell
2002	Interview	Brit Hume	Gary Hart	Allen Iverson	Lennox Lewis	Bill O'Reilly	Curt Schilling	Fred Durst	Harrison Ford	Larry Ellison	Al Michaels	Willie Nelson	Denzel Washington
2002	20Q	Dan Patrick	Hugh Jackman	Jamie Foxx	Sarah Silverman	Milla Jovovich	Oscar de la Hoya	Chris Isaak	Amanda Peet	Lenny Kravitz	Jamie Oliver	Marshall Faulk	Greg Kinnear
2003	Interview	Halle Berry	Jimmy Kimmel	Colin Farrell	Jay-Z	Billy Bob Thornton	Mike Piazza	Lisa Marie Presley	Tobey Maguire	Jon Gruden	O.J.Simpson	Quentin Tarantino	John Cusack
2003	20Q	Ron Insana	Bernie Mac	Juliette Lewis	Andy Richter	Jorja Fox	Nelly	Rachel Weisz	Charles Rangel	Nicolas Cage	Joe Rogan	Bill Murray	William H. Macy
2004	Interview	Jack Nicholson	Kiefer Sutherland	Jim Carrey	50 Cent	Johnny Depp	Derek Jeter	Michael Moore	Matt Damon	Google Guys	Donald Trump	Oliver Stone	Bernie Mac
2004	20Q	Al Franken	Dave Matthews	William Petersen	Kevin Smith	Matthew Perry	Jude Law	Christina Applegate	Spike Lee	Terrell Owens	Jimmy Fallon	John Carmack	Dustin Hoffman
2005	Interview	Toby Keith	Nicole Kidman	The Rock	Les Moonves	James Spader	Lance Armstrong	Owen Wilson	Ewan McGregor	Thomas L. Friedman	George Carlin	Jamie Foxx	Pierce Brosnan
2005	20Q	James Caan	Jolene Blalock	Kid Rock	Mena Suvari	Vitali Klitschko	Paul Giamatti	Scarlett Johansson	Kate Hudson	Kurt Busch	Ozzy Osbourne	Steve Carell	Al Pacino
2006	Interview	Mark Cuban	Al Franken	Kanye West	Keanu Reeves	Ozzie Guillen	Shepard Smith	Jerry Bruckheimer	Denis Leary	Michael Brown	Ludacris	Arianna Huffington	Dixie Chicks
2006	20Q	Kate Beckinsale	Hugh Laurie	Franz Ferdinand	Craig Ferguson	Rebecca Romijn	Jason Lee	Dana White	Luke Wilson	Eva Longoria	Johnny Knoxville	Tenacious D	Samuel L. Jackson
2007	Interview	T. Boone Pickens	Simon Cowell	Jeremy Piven	Bill Maher	Steve Nash	Matt Groening	Bruce Willis	Chris Tucker	Clive Owen	Keith Olbermann	Robert Redford	Bill Richardson
2007	20Q	Ellen Pompeo	Bettie Page	Mariah Carey	Will Arnett	Fergie	Don Rickles	Danica Patrick	Paul Rudd	Jamie Pressly	Ali Larter	Matt Leinart	Joaquin Phoenix
2008	Interview	Tina Fey	Matthew McConaughey	Garry Kasparov	Chad Kroeger	Fareed Zakaria	Steve Carell	Drew Pinsky	Ben Stiller	Dana White	Pete Wentz	Daniel Craig	Hugh Jackman
2008	20Q	Helena Bonham Carter	Rachel Bilson	Charles Barkley	Jenna Fischer	Bob Saget	Harvey Levin	Lewis Black	Selma Blair	Anna Faris	Kevin Connolly	Chelsea Handler	Rosario Dawson
2009	Interview	Richard Branson	Hugh Laurie	Kenny Chesney	Seth Rogen	Chuck Palahniuk	Shia Labeouf	Alec Baldwin		Seth MacFarlane	Woody Harrelson	Benicio Del Toro	James Cameron
2009	20Q	Marston and Cooper Hefner	Josh Holloway	Flight Of The Concords	Amy Smart	Zachary Quinto	Scott Boras	Judd Apatow		Diane Kruger	Shawne Merriman	Tracy Morgan	Quinton Jackson

== 2010–2020; 2025–present ==
		January	February	March	April	May	June	July	August	September	October	November	December
2010	Interview	Sean Combs		John Mayer	Sarah Silverman	Matthew Fox	Michael Savage	Cameron Diaz	Cornel West	Paul Reubens	Josh Brolin	Robert Downey Jr.	Conan O'Brien
2010	20Q	Guy Fieri		Shaun White	Will Forte	B. J. Novak	Russell Brand	Stephen Moyer	Michael Cera	John Varvatos	William Shatner	Zach Galifianakis	Olivia Wilde
2011	Interview	Frank Gehry	Lamar Odom	Deepak Chopra	Helen Thomas	Barney Frank	Lawrence O'Donnell	Justin Timberlake	James Franco	Steve Buscemi	Paul Rudd	Anthony Bourdain	Craig Ferguson
2011	20Q	Chloë Sevigny	Aziz Ansari	Seth Green	Josh Radnor	Ed Helms	Louis C.K.	Jason Sudeikis	Bryan Cranston	Amber Heard	Gordon Ramsay	Rashida Jones	Kaley Cuoco
2012	Interview	Chris Wallace		Paul Krugman	Jon Hamm	David Brooks	Tom Cruise	Charlie Sheen		Richard Dawkins	Lee Child	Stephen Colbert	Quentin Tarantino
2012	20Q	Nick Offerman		David Cross	Meghan McCain	Chris Evans	Rhys Ifans	Andy Samberg		Joseph Gordon-Levitt	Dax Shepard	Krysten Ritter	Padma Lakshmi
2013	Interview	Matt Damon		Jimmy Kimmel	Clive Davis	J. J. Abrams	Ai Weiwei	Sean Hannity		Tony Robbins	Samuel L. Jackson	Bernie Sanders	Ray Kelly
2013	20Q	Scott Speedman		Chris Hardwick	Lena Dunham	Peter Dinklage	Kevin Smith and Jason Mewes	Armie Hammer		Bill Hader	James Deen	Idris Elba	James Marsden
2014	Interview	Ben Affleck		Nick Denton	Stan Lee	Tony Hsieh	Jonah Hill	Gary Oldman		James Spader	David Fincher	Brian Schweitzer	Joaquin Phoenix
2014	20Q	Patton Oswalt		Ty Burrell	Iggy Pop	Kate Mara	Kevin Hart	Marc Maron		Frank Miller	Rob Corddry	David Walton	Charlie Day
2015	Interview	Dan Savage		Vince Vaughn	Dick Cheney	Bill Maher	Reza Aslan	Jeremy Renner		Sanjay Gupta	Joseph Gordon-Levitt	Christoph Waltz	Bryan Cranston
2015	20Q	Nick Kroll		Ben Schwartz	Aubrey Plaza	Josh Hartnett	Charlie Gasparino	Lizzy Caplan		Josh Grobin	Jeff Garlin	Daniel Radcliffe	Billy Eichner
2016	Interview	Ron Howard		Rachel Maddow	Don Cheadle	Ray Kurzweil	Trevor Noah	Ta-Nehisi Coates		Andy Samberg	Jason Dill	Michael Hayden	Billy Bob Thornton
2016	20Q	Duplass Brothers		Abbi Jacobson, Ilana Glazer	Bob Odenkirk	Keegan-Michael Key	Rose Byrne	Wiz Khalifa		Miles Teller	Rachel Bloom	Jeffrey Dean Morgan	Anna Kendrick
2017	Interview	Matthew McConaughey		Scarlett Johansson		Ezra Klein		Christopher Nolan		Patton Oswalt		Chelsea Handler	
2017	20Q	Fred Armisen		Adam Scott		Kumail Nanjiani		Alison Brie		Halsey		James Corden	
2018	Interview	Christie Hefner		John Krasinski		Cecile Richards		Kathy Griffin		Michael Shannon		Tucker Carlson	
2018	20Q	Cillian Murphy		Jesse Plemons		Jim Jefferies		LaKeith Stanfield		Sofia Boutella		Charlie Cox	
2019	Interview	Sam Harris			Seth Abramson			Tarana Burke			Jeremy O. Harris		
2019	20Q	Taraji P. Henson			David Harbour			Maren Morris			Thomas Middleditch		
2020	Interview	Christiane Amanpour			Jameela Jamil			publishing hiatus begins					
2020	20Q	Diane Guerrero			Patrick Stewart			publishing hiatus begins					
2025	Interview	Nikki Glaser											
2025	20Q	Eric Church											
