= Rolling Thunder (organization) =

US advocacy group

- Formation: 1987, incorporated 1995
- Type: 501(c)(4) non-profit
- Purpose: To bring full accountability for the 'Prisoners Of War' and 'Missing In Action' of all U.S. wars
- Headquarters: Neshanic Station, New Jersey
- Region served: International
- Members: 90 Chapters
- Website: rollingthunder1.com

Rolling Thunder is a United States advocacy group that seeks to bring full accountability for prisoners of war (POWs) and missing in action (MIA) service members of all U.S. wars. The group's first demonstration was in 1988. It was incorporated in 1995, and has more than 90 chapters throughout the US, as well as overseas.

Their main annual event occurs on the Sunday before Memorial Day, in Columbus Ohio at the National Veteran's Memorial and Museum. Columbus is the new home for Rolling Thunder (Ohio/Midwest) beginning in 2020. Previously the event took place in Washington DC in which members make a slow motorcycle ride, called the "First Amendment Demonstration Run" or "Ride for Freedom," on a dedicated, closed-off, pre-set route through Washington D.C., leaving the Pentagon parking lot at noon, crossing the Memorial Bridge, and ending at the Vietnam Veterans Memorial ("the Wall"). During the Rolling Thunder weekend, members and supporters spend time at the Thunder Alley (the official vendor site for the event), visit significant areas of Washington D.C., particularly the numerous memorials, and hear speeches given by members, supporters, military officials and politicians. In 2019 it was announced that the ride for that year would be the final time. On Sept. 19, National POW-MIA Recognition Day, AMVETS announced it will replace the demonstration ride in Washington with an event to be called "Rolling to Remember," on the same day and place with the same mission Rolling Thunder had used, adding suicide prevention as an additional issue.

== History ==
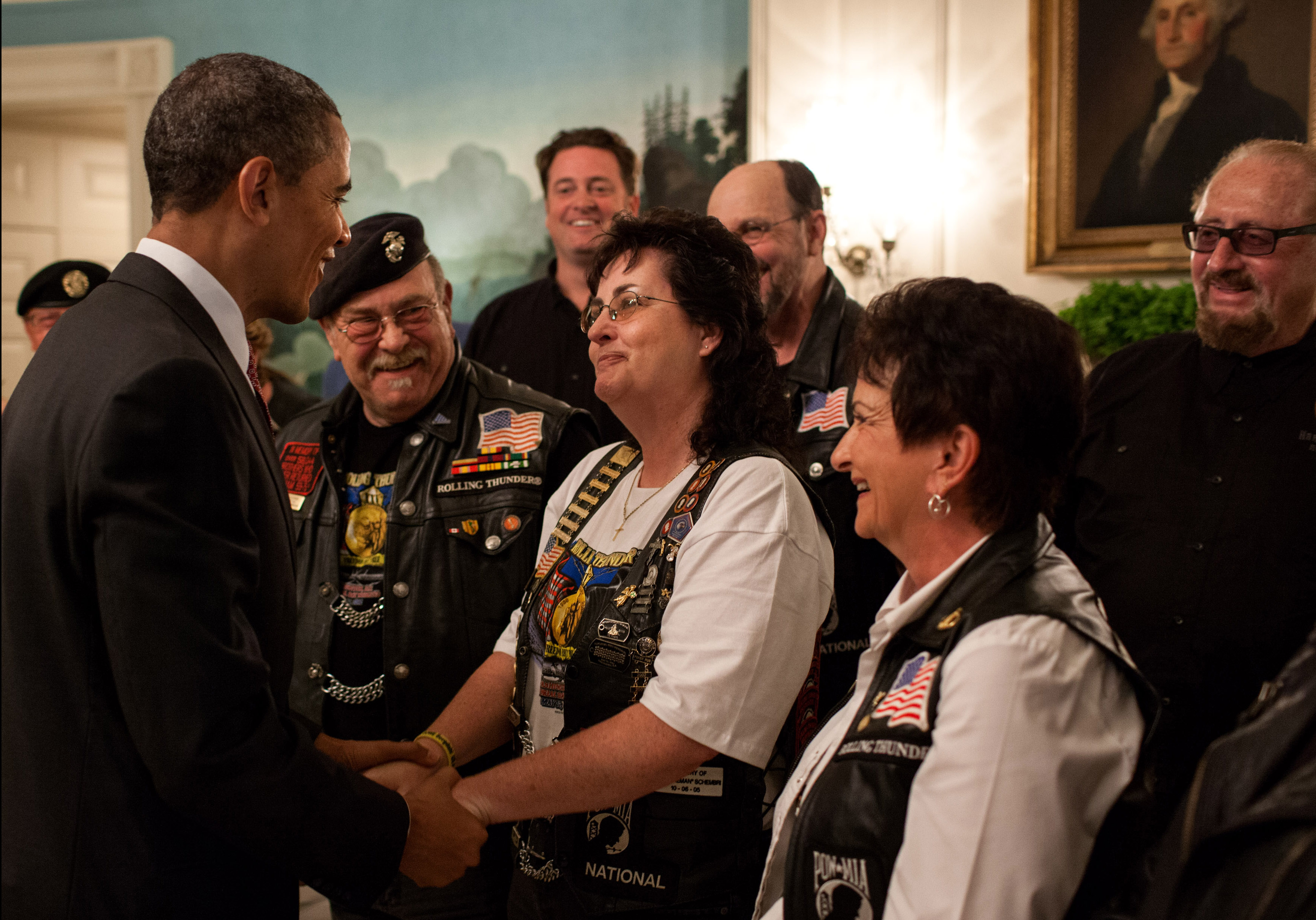
Rolling Thunder members being greeted by President Barack Obama in 2012

In 1987 Rolling Thunder made its first ride to the Vietnam War Memorial.

Ray Manzo, a former United States Marine Corps Corporal, U.S. Army Sergeant Major John Holland (Ret.), Marine First Sergeant Walt Sides (Ret.) and Sergeant Ted Sampley (Ret.) are the four men that are credited with starting Rolling Thunder before its incorporation in 1995.

In 1987, Manzo visited the Vietnam Veterans Memorial in Washington, D.C., talked with fellow veterans, and first learned that American servicemen had been abandoned in Southeast Asia at the end of the Vietnam War. This was counter to his Marine Corps training to leave no man behind, and he became consumed with the idea that he must do something to bring attention to this issue. Manzo attended a POW/MIA vigil sponsored by the Vietnam Veterans Motorcycle Club when the idea came to him to host a motorcycle rally in the nation's capital to show the country and the world that U.S. prisoners of war and missing in action (POW/MIA) still mattered to their fellow servicemen and the country for which they sacrificed their freedom.

Manzo drafted a letter for a call to action and began mailing it to motorcycling publications. He enlisted fellow veterans from the Washington D.C. area to help him through the red tape of requirements. Sgt. Major John Holland was experienced in government legislation and included 1st Sgt. Walt Sides, and Washington activist Sgt. Ted Sampley also joined them. These were the founders of Rolling Thunder. Ted Sampley's colleague, Bob Schmitt, coined the phrase "Rolling Thunder". While staring at the Memorial Bridge and envisioning Manzo's dream, he said, "It will be like the sound of rolling thunder coming across the bridge."

On Memorial Day 1988, Cpl. Manzo recruited 2,500 men and women to attend Rolling Thunder I.

=== Rolling Thunder Run to the Wall ===
Rolling Thunder Run to the Wall
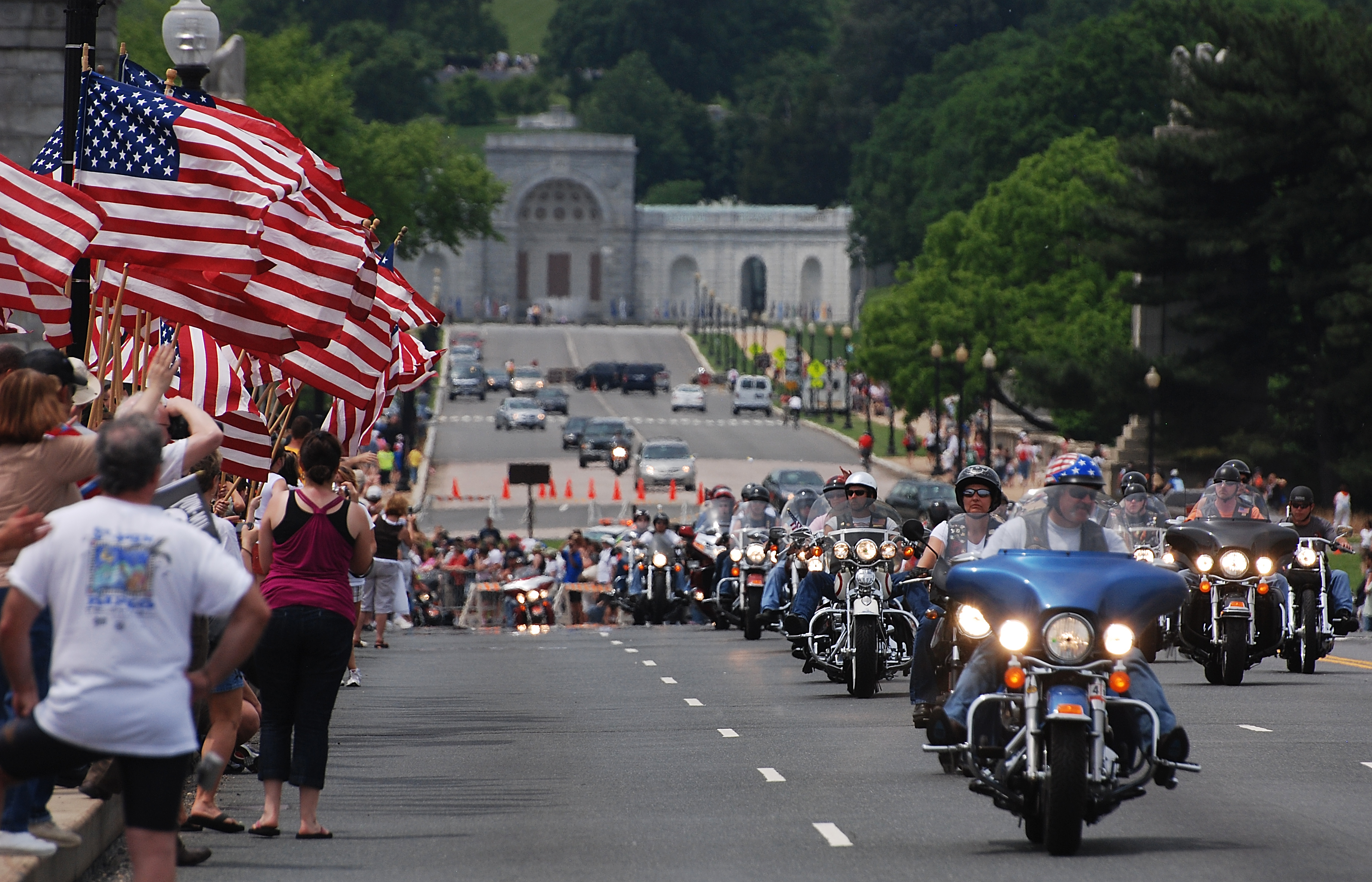
- The Rolling Thunder Run on Arlington Memorial Bridge in 2010
- Status: Defunct
- Genre: Motorcycle rally
- Begins: Sunday, Memorial Day weekend
- Frequency: Annual
- Location: Washington D.C. area
- Inaugurated: 1987
- Most recent: 2019
- Attendance: 500,000 (2018)
- Organiser: Rolling Thunder
- Website: www.rollingthunder1.com

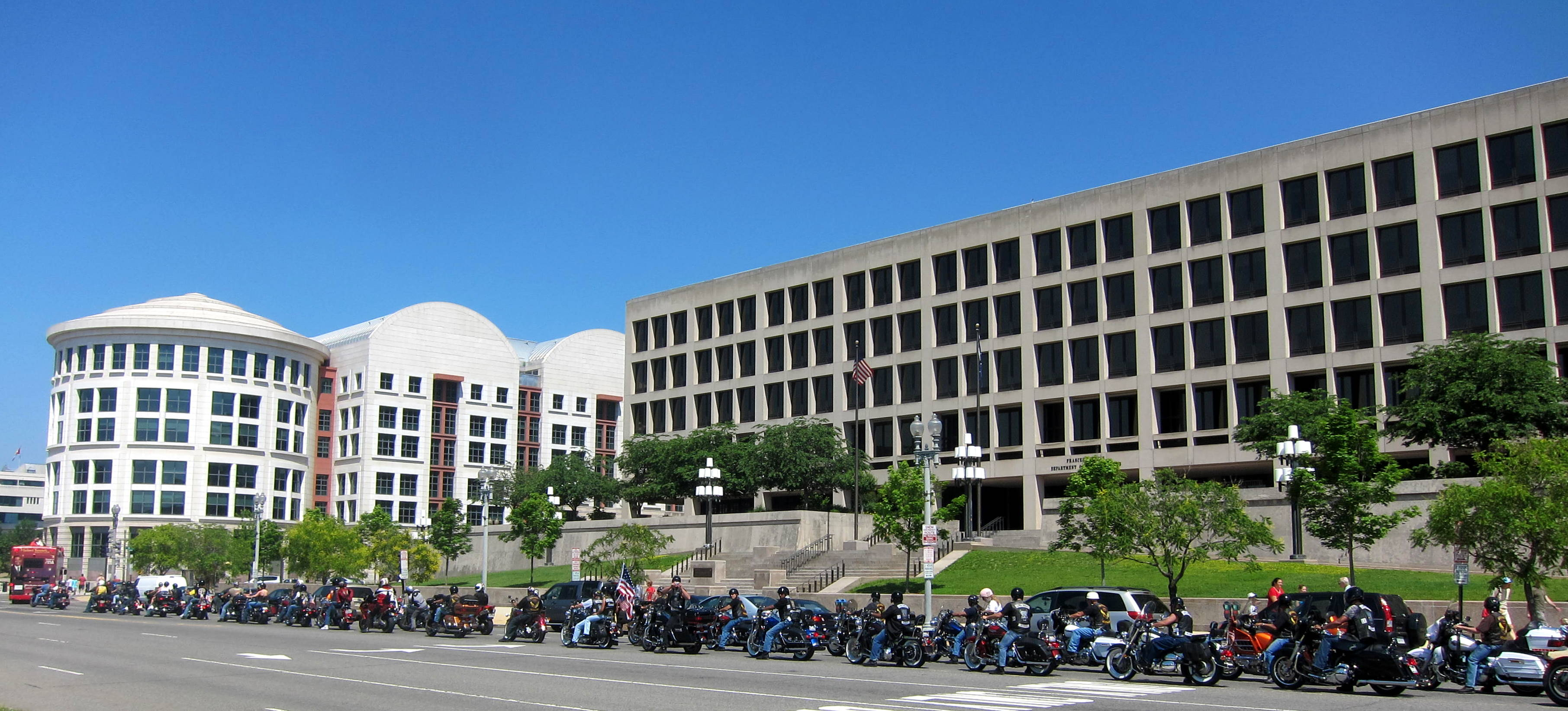
The Rolling Thunder riding on Constitution Avenue in 2010

The First Amendment Demonstration Run, formerly Rolling Thunder Run to the Wall, was a motorcycle rally sponsored by the Rolling Thunder organization. The ride began on Sunday at the Pentagon after a "blessing of the bikes" at the National Cathedral on Friday and associated events end on Monday.

Beginning in 1987 and continuing through 2019, Rolling Thunder conducted the Run to the Wall on the Sunday of Memorial Day Weekend to show their continued support for the efforts to find lost service men and women of past conflicts. In May 2001 the estimated number of motorcycles involved in this rally was 200,000. The event drew an estimated 350,000 motorcyclists in May 2008, and 500,000 in 2018. The rally was canceled in 2019.

== Chapters ==
Rolling Thunder has 88 chapters covering 29 states all of which are governed by the same constitution and bylaws. Many of Rolling Thunder's members are veterans and own motorcycles; however, neither is a requirement for membership. All Members of this organization must be willing to help fight the prisoner of war missing in action issue, which still exists. To help protect future veterans from becoming POW-MIA's and to help veterans in need from all wars.

Rolling Thunder also allows for the formation of new chapters worldwide. All chapters of Rolling Thunder have their own president and board members and are accountable for fund raising proceeds and tax information. New chapters must have a minimum of 20 members including the president and board members.

== Charities ==
Rolling Thunder has expanded its operations to include Rolling Thunder Charities as of 2007, a class 501(c)(3) non-profit organization. This part of the organization adheres to the same laws that govern its parent corporation. Rolling Thunder Charities was designed to help members as well as U.S. Military troops and their families that are in need of financial help. Rolling Thunder Charities sells Rolling Thunder memorabilia and conducts other fundraising activities.

== Legislation ==
Rolling Thunder was influential in the passing of the Missing Service Personnel Act of 1993. The bill states that a service member cannot be listed as killed in action (KIA) without substantial evidence. In 1995 Rolling Thunder Inc. won approval from the United States Government for a POW/MIA postage stamp to be put in circulation and the organization continues to work with the U.S. Senate and House of Representatives on new bills for the return of, and information about, servicemen and women. Rolling Thunder co-authored the 2006 Respect for America's Fallen Heroes Act.

== Criticism ==
The Economist said the organization "was founded...to advance a specific crackpot belief: that successive Republican and Democratic administrations have concealed evidence that American captives are being held alive in South-East Asia."
