= Ted Sampley =

Activist for U.S. prisoners of war/missing in action after Vietnam War

- Sampley wearing his green beret
- Born: Theodore Lane Sampley; July 17, 1946; Wilmington, North Carolina, U.S.
- Died: May 12, 2009 (aged 62); Durham, North Carolina, U.S.
- Burial place: Dyson Cemetery, Ivanhoe, North Carolina
- Spouse(s): Kiku Uehara Sampley, Robin Owen Sampley
- Children: 2
- Military career
- Allegiance: United States
- Branch: Army
- Service years: 1963–1973
- Rank: Staff sergeant
- Units: 173rd Airborne Brigade, 3d Special Operations Squadron, 6th Special Operations Squadron
- Awards: 4 Bronze Stars, Army Commendation Medal, Vietnamese Cross of Gallantry
- Other work: Pottery, POW/MIA activism

Theodore Lane Sampley (July 17, 1946 – May 12, 2009) was an American Vietnam War veteran and activist. He primarily advocated for those servicemen still considered missing in action or prisoners of war (POW-MIA) as of the end of hostilities in 1975. A staunch political conservative, he also ran for local political office several times. He is credited with the research that identified Air Force Lt. Michael Blassie as the Vietnam fatality buried at the Tomb of the Unknown Soldier, and for his role in organizing the annual Rolling Thunder motorcycle event in Washington. In Kinston, North Carolina, where he lived for much of his adult life, he was known for his local civic activism, most notably his effort to build a replica of the Confederate ironclad CSS Neuse, the only full-size replica of a Confederate ironclad, in the city's downtown.

A native of Wilmington, North Carolina, he enlisted in the Army in 1963. Two years later, he was deployed to Vietnam with the 173rd Airborne Brigade, where he did a year's tour of duty as a combat infantryman. Afterwards he became a Green Beret and served another tour leading and training a Civilian Irregular Defense Group along the Cambodian border, earning four Bronze Stars, an Army Commendation Medal and the Vietnamese Cross of Gallantry. After returning to Fort Bragg to train other Special Forces soldiers for duty in Vietnam, he left the Army in 1973 with the rank of staff sergeant.

Following his honorable discharge, Sampley worked in journalism and then settled in Kinston, North Carolina, where he opened a craft store selling ceramics, an art he had learned from local artisans in his off-duty time while stationed on Okinawa at the beginning of his military career. In the early 1980s he began his activism, after learning that not all the POWs and MIAs in Vietnam at the end of the war had been accounted for, joining groups demanding that the U.S. put pressure on the Vietnamese government. He started and published U.S. Veterans Dispatch, a newspaper primarily devoted to the issue.

Sampley soon became known as an outspoken activist for his cause, using confrontational tactics similar to those used by antiwar protestors. He was particularly hostile to Senators John Kerry and John McCain, both of whom had served in Vietnam and were members of the 1993 Senate select committee which found that no POWs or MIAs remained alive in Southeast Asia. McCain himself, whom Sampley frequently accused of having been brainwashed by the Vietnamese during his years as a POW in the Hanoi Hilton, said Sampley was "one of the most despicable people I have ever had the misfortune to encounter"; Sampley was convicted of assault after a fight with McCain's chief of staff. He was criticized further for using the POW-MIA cause for his aggrandizement and personal enrichment; sculptor Frederick Hart successfully sued Sampley for unpaid royalties over his unauthorized use of Hart's The Three Soldiers on T-shirts he sold near the Vietnam Veterans Memorial on the National Mall.

== 1946–1973: Early life and military career ==
Theodore Lane Sampley was born on July 17, 1946, in Wilmington, North Carolina. After growing up on a tobacco farm there, he enlisted in the Army in 1963, aged 17. Following basic training, Sampley went through advanced infantry training and then Airborne School. The next year he was assigned to the 173rd Airborne Brigade, then stationed on the Japanese island of Okinawa. While there, when off-duty, he visited local potters and began to study ceramics.

In 1965, the 173rd was deployed to Vietnam. Sampley served a year's tour of duty as a combat infantryman, recalling later that he had known very little about the growing conflict at that time. He was then promoted to sergeant and spent a second tour commanding a B-36 MIKE Force unit of indigenous minority population along the Cambodian border, part of the Civilian Irregular Defense Group program. In that capacity he earned four Bronze Stars, the Army Commendation Medal and the Vietnamese Cross of Gallantry.

Sampley wrote in his online biography that he was one of a few Americans sent to train at the British Army's Jungle Warfare School in Johor Bahru, Malaysia. The two-month course was taught by instructors from the Australian and New Zealand armies as well as the British. He and the other Americans wore British uniforms so the British Army could better keep it secret that they were training Americans there.

Returning to the U.S., Sampley became a Green Beret assigned to first the 3d, then the 6th Special Forces Group. He trained in, and trained others, in military subjects from guerilla warfare to High Altitude Low Opening parachute jumping. He also learned to speak Arabic and Japanese fluently.

Part of the Special Forces curriculum was training in how to be a prisoner of war (POW), an issue Sampley said later he did not know much about until then. During the early 1970s, he began volunteering with Americans Who Care, a group formed in nearby Fayetteville to raise awareness about the issue. When the war ended, with US POWs released and returning home, Sampley believed, like many other Americans, that they had all been accounted for. Having attained the rank of staff sergeant, he was honorably discharged in 1973.

== 1973–1983: Post-military career ==
After returning to civilian life, Sampley recalled, "I just kind of withdrew back into myself, like a lot of vets did." He worked in journalism, both for a local weekly newspaper and a television station. His interest in pottery, first piqued during his time on Okinawa, returned, and after building his own kiln decided to try making and selling his own pottery. He started his business, The Potter's Wheel, and within two years had produced and sold 90,000 pieces, some of which were featured in a 1980 Country Living pictorial on rural potters in North Carolina.

Sampley also became active in local politics. He served on the New Hanover County Republican committee. In 1976, 1978 and 1980 he ran unsuccessfully for county commissioner.

Sampley's political efforts were not without controversy. During his 1976 campaign, the county's sheriff sued him for slander. Three years later, he tried to have the sheriff arrested. The county's Republican chairman would later refer to him as "a millstone around our necks".

In 1982, during a relative's court case, Sampley got into an altercation in the courthouse. He was arrested, and ultimately convicted of assaulting a law enforcement officer. Years later, he expressed regret for the incident. "Some of those guys were my friends", he said.

== 1983–2009: POW/MIA activism ==
The POW/MIA flag

In 1982, Sampley was one of the many Vietnam veterans who went to Washington for the dedication ceremonies of the Vietnam Veterans Memorial on the National Mall, a memorial whose design he had criticized. (Note: While there were many criticisms of Maya Lin's design, Sampley chose to focus on its shape, suggesting that the architect, born in Ohio to Chinese immigrants, was evoking the hanzi 人, (rén), which usually means "person", with its two angular lines. Sampley took this to come from a Confucian, humanistic tradition, which he traced to Lin's parents. But according to Lin's biographer Donald Langmead, both her parents' families had converted to Christianity several generations before they emigrated to the U.S.; they were in fact practicing Methodists, both of whom were educated entirely within that faith, without any exposure to Chinese traditions.) At the ceremonies he heard many other veterans express doubt that all the POWs and other servicemembers officially considered missing in action from Vietnam-era combat operations in Southeast Asia had been accounted for as the government had claimed since 1975, particularly those they had known personally. Sampley concluded from those discussions that the government knew more than it was publicly disclosing, and decided to get the answers.

"When I came back from the war, I had trouble with authority figures", he recalled in 2001. "I heard people talking about how it was time to get over the war, I thought, How? When you've seen human beings all around you reduced to rotting flesh, you can't just flip a switch and turn things off."

After returning home, he resumed his activism on behalf of prisoners of war and those servicemembers still listed as missing in action (POW/MIA) in Vietnam. He, along with some families of the POW/MIAs unaccounted for at the end of the war, believed not only that the Vietnamese government knew more than it had publicly acknowledged about the fate of some of those men, but that some had survived the end of the war and were even still alive in captivity. The National League of POW/MIA Families (NLF), an organization founded during the war by Sybil Stockdale, wife of James Stockdale, the highest-ranking U.S. Navy POW during the war, took on a public role lobbying on this issue, and Sampley joined those efforts.

Sampley took a highly visible public role in the movement, leading demonstrations and speaking to the media. He also started his own newspaper, U.S. Veterans News and Report (later U.S. Veterans Dispatch), to publicize the issue; it would later be described as "required reading for the MIA hardcore." Many of his protests had elements of civil disobedience—he often had the daughters of MIA servicemen chain themselves to the gates of the White House or other government buildings, and sometimes threw fake blood on security officers, especially the uniformed Secret Service officers at the White House.

Other protests Sampley organized were more confrontational. He had protestors in bamboo cages, similar to those in which some POWs were exhibited publicly during their time in Vietnam, placed on the front lawn of Donald Regan, then chief of staff to President Ronald Reagan. He also led another group to the house of Defense Secretary Frank Carlucci during a heavy snowstorm, where they blocked his driveway with 1,800 care packages intended for POWs they believed were still alive and being held in Laos.

The effort to draw attention to those prisoners believed to be held in Laos took Sampley and other American activists to that country in 1988. They traveled to its border with Thailand along the Mekong River and surreptitiously attempted to distribute dollar bills stamped with the reward offer, some floated in the river, offering a US$2.4 million reward for information about possible U.S. POWs allegedly still held in the country. While two members were captured and detained by Laotian authorities for six weeks, Sampley, who called Laos a "black hole" for missing Americans, was only briefly detained when he returned to Thailand illegally.

Even allies in the POW/MIA effort found themselves targeted by Sampley's protests for what he considered to be a willingness to compromise. He organized a "bounty hunt" in which participants were encouraged to target NLF head Ann Mills Griffiths and other organization officials with water balloons, cream pies and rotten tomatoes if they saw them. At another time he led a group of protestors to occupy the NLF office in the American Legion's headquarters. While Sampley later described the effort as peaceful, Griffiths recalled that he threatened to kill her before being handcuffed and led out of the building.

Sampley later acknowledged his tactics were inspired by those used in late 1960s political protests. "I took my training in guerrilla warfare and I turned it around on the U.S. government," he told the Phoenix New Times in 1999. "I started thinking of as many types of tricks as I could pull to disrupt the system ... The idea was ... to disrupt the process, to cause the government to have to talk about the POW issue."

=== The Last Firebase ===
In 1984 Homecoming II, a POW/MIA information project named after Operation Homecoming, the original return of POWs after the war, was founded in Kansas as a local effort. The founders began compiling information on POW/MIA cases, from biographies to reports of their possible survival in captivity, and began lobbying the U.S. and Vietnamese governments. Within a year, they realized they had compiled and made public more information about the cases than the Pentagon had given a congressional task force investigating the issue.

The following year the group established a booth on the Mall near the Lincoln Memorial where they initially kept a vigil to raise awareness of the POW/MIA issue and sold merchandise to support it. They also supported demonstrations in the area by veterans, including one who locked himself in a bamboo cage and began a hunger strike. It was named The Last Firebase, after the fire support bases established by U.S. artillery units in Vietnam to support infantry operations against the Vietcong.

In 1989 the founder of Homecoming II stepped down due to family issues and asked Sampley to take over. He led the organization until its dissolution in 1993. The archives the group had compiled were transferred to the newly created The Last Firebase Veterans Archive Project. A year later Sampley would use information from those files to identify the Vietnam Unknown Soldier as missing Air Force Lt. Michael Blassie.

=== Rolling Thunder ===
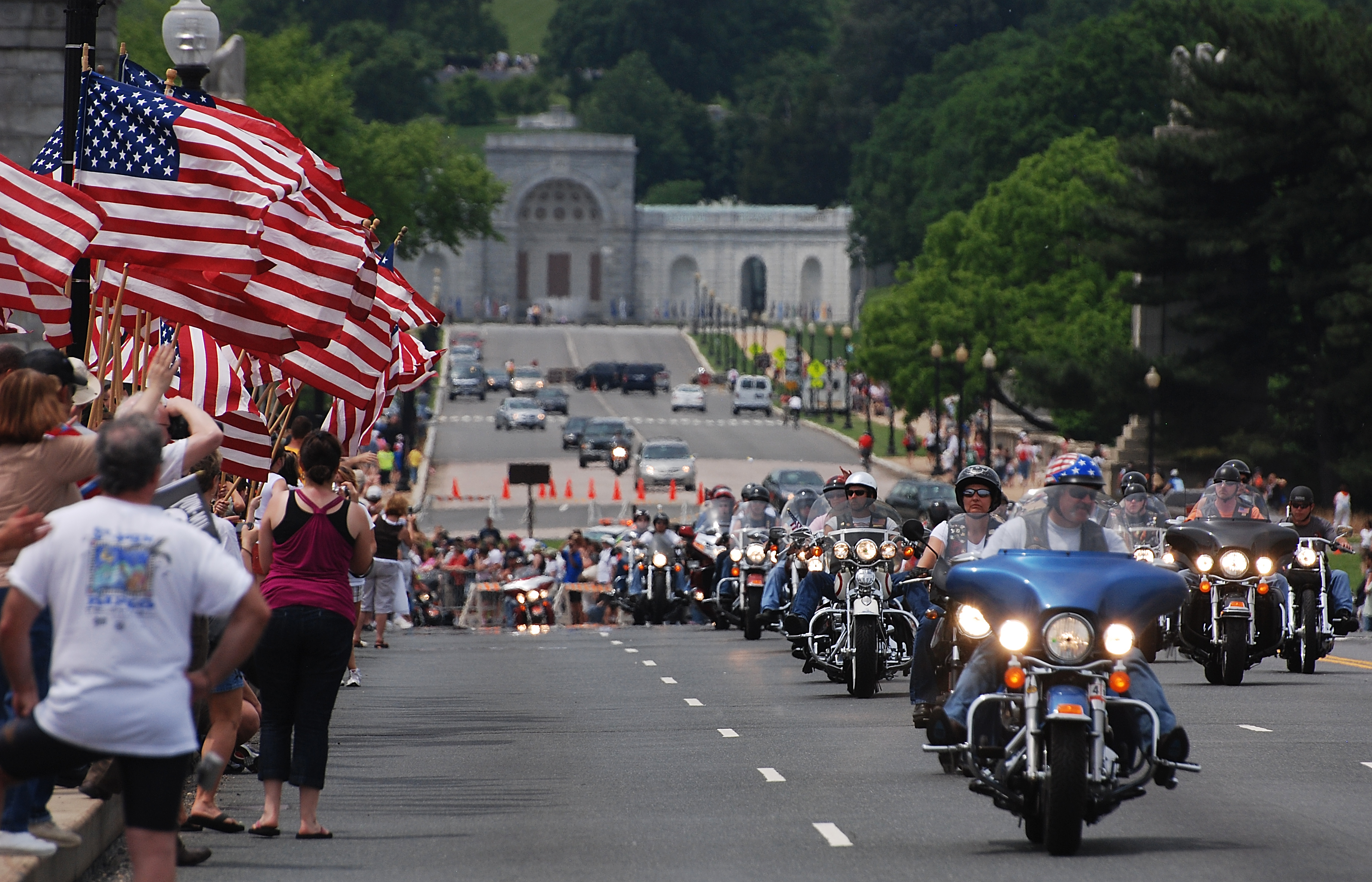
Rolling Thunder riders passing onlookers at the Arlington Memorial Bridge into the District of Columbia at the 2009 ride. Arlington National Cemetery is in the background.

In 1987 Ray Manzo, a Marine veteran of the war, visited the memorial in Washington. After stopping at a booth near the memorial run by one of Sampley's organizations, he learned about the POW/MIA issue. As a Marine trained to leave no man behind, the idea that living POWs might still be in Southeast Asia disturbed him, and he resolved to do something about it. He joined forces with Sampley and two other veterans to organize Rolling Thunder, a motorcycle ride from the Pentagon parking lot to the memorial named after a bombing campaign during the war, to show that veterans still cared about their missing comrades. The first run, held the following year, attracted 2,500 riders, a number that has grown with the years. It has since been held every year on the Sunday of Memorial Day weekend, and has become one of the capital's best-attended annual events.

The organization established to support the annual runs has also lobbied for passage of laws supportive of the POW/MIA issue. In 1993 Congress passed the Missing Service Personnel Act, which requires that the Defense Department have substantial evidence that a missing servicemember was killed in action before listing them as such. Two years later the Postal Service issued a stamp with the POW/MIA flag on it, following Rolling Thunder's lobbying.

=== Identification of Vietnam Unknown Soldier ===
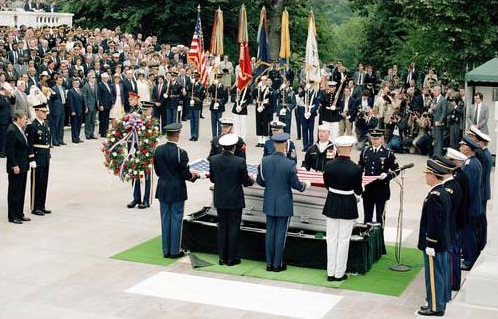
The 1984 ceremony at which the Vietnam Unknown Soldier, later identified as Michael Blassie, was buried

In 1984 Sampley had gone to Washington again for another Vietnam War-related ceremony, the interment of apparently unidentified remains from that war in the Tomb of the Unknown Soldier. A decade later he published an article in his newspaper asserting that the remains could, in fact, be identified. Items found with the remains in 1972, he alleged, indicated that the fallen serviceman was Air Force Lt. Michael Blassie, whose A-37 Dragonfly jet fighter had been shot down in the area five months before six bones found during the Battle of An Lộc. No other U.S. MIA within 2,500 square miles (6,500 km^{2}) of where the remains were found, Sampley wrote, would have had the life raft, parachute, holster and identity card found with the body.

Sampley contacted Blassie's family after publishing his article. Their inquiries found that the South Vietnamese Army patrol which found the bones had also found his ID card and a wallet with a picture of his family and relayed that information to U.S. forces in the area. However the Army lab charged with identifying remains found it unlikely that the remains were Blassie's based on identification techniques later found to be questionable; the ID and wallet had been lost or stolen during their transfer there. In 1980 they were classified as unknown; the remains were later buried as the Vietnam Unknown Soldier, despite not meeting selection criteria calling for 80% of the body, in the wake of political pressure from the president and Congress.

In 1997 Vince Gonzales, a junior CBS News correspondent, read Sampley's article and began replicating the research with requests for documents under the Freedom of Information Act. He came to the same conclusion as Sampley, and the following year CBS reported that the remains were likely those of Blassie. The remains were later exhumed and DNA was found to be a match to Blassie's family; they were reburied near his home and the crypt in which he had lain for 14 years at Arlington was deliberately left empty to symbolize the fallen from Vietnam still not returned home. Sampley told CNN the whole process "was at the very best premature and at worst a politically expedient attempt to further close the books on the POW/MIA issue".

== Controversies ==
Some of Sampley's activities on behalf of POW/MIA servicemen led to controversy and, in one case, another assault conviction.

=== Allegations of fabrication and backlash ===
In 1988 Vietnam returned the remains of Navy Cmdr. Edwin B. Tucker, who had been listed as MIA and presumed dead after his plane was shot down over the country in 1973. Shortly after they were buried, Sampley held a news conference in Norfolk, Virginia, home to the Navy's Atlantic Fleet, where Tucker had been based during his service. Sampley claimed that instead of having been just discovered by the Vietnamese, Tucker's remains had in fact been kept on public display during the intervening years, after he had been beaten severely by the villagers where he parachuted into. In order to get them back, Sampley claimed, the Tucker family had been forbidden to say this. Tucker's son publicly denied this the next day and questioned why anyone would keep an unpreserved human corpse on display under glass for that long.

According to Susan Katz Keating, a former reporter for the conservative Washington Times who went from believing completely in the possibility of living POWs to considering it a hoax, Sampley told a similar story of a downed American pilot killed by natives of the country he had parachuted into early in the 1991 Persian Gulf War. She recalled him calling her about Robert Wetzel, another Navy pilot shot down over Iraq, saying that he was carved up by natives who found his nametag and assumed him to be Jewish, then distributed portions of his body as souvenirs and was telling her despite the Pentagon's attempts to keep the story secret; he had nevertheless told Wetzel's family. Wetzel was later released unharmed; Keating recalled that Sampley later told her he had never completely believed the story but told it anyway to keep attention on the plight of POWs still believed to be in Southeast Asia. Later, Sampley responded that he had indeed found a story reporting that an American pilot had been beaten and killed by a Baghdad mob after being shot down and distributed it in good faith; he never told the Wetzels about it.

In 1992 one of Sampley's protests resulted in the NLF publicly distancing itself from his actions. He had organized a group to disrupt a speech by President George H. W. Bush to the organization's annual assembly. NLF officials were able to prevent Sampley himself from attending the event, and Secret Service officers arrested him for trespassing before Bush appeared. But his group began heckling the president with chants of "No more lies!". After they refused Bush's requests to let him finish, he finally yelled "Would you please shut up and sit down!" at them; the incident made national news. The NLF's leadership was fearful that this would damage their relationship with the administration, and Griffiths not only personally apologized to Bush in a letter but took out newspaper ads with the same message.

=== The Three Soldiers copyright infringement lawsuit ===
In the late 1980s an organization Sampley founded, The Last Firebase (TLF), began operating a booth near the Vietnam Veterans Memorial, where it sold T-shirts and other memorabilia to support the POW/MIA cause. This brought them into conflict with other veterans' groups, such as the NLF and the Veterans of Foreign Wars. Not only did they object to commercial activity so close to what they considered to be a solemn site of reflection and remembrance, they pointed out that TLF and two other organizations that were using the adjacent space for similar purposes were operating under National Park Service (NPS) permits that were intended for public gatherings on federal parkland, such as the 24-hour vigils for POW/MIA servicemembers that they had started out doing.

Jan Scruggs, president of the Vietnam Veterans Memorial Foundation (VVMF), who had spearheaded the effort to erect the memorial, was especially incensed. "[They're] a blight on what's supposed to be one of the most beautiful places in the country," he told the Washington City Paper in 1991, pointing to a photo of the trash the booths left behind. Scruggs' opposition was particularly antagonistic to Sampley and other POW/MIA activists who volunteered at the booths since Scruggs was highly skeptical of claims that any American military personnel otherwise unaccounted for in Southeast Asia, having suggested that believing they were was akin to believing that UFOs were real.

Scruggs had also angered the veterans at the booths by saying that they perpetuated stereotypes of Vietnam veterans as disgruntled and alienated from society. He noted that he himself, like many other veterans, had gone onto a professional career, in his case in law, after his return from Vietnam and efforts to build the memorial. "I suppose some of them are down there having a good time", he said in 2001. "It's better than working at Wal-Mart."

The NPS was reluctant to take action against TLF and the other organizations operating the booths, since they were in compliance with the terms of their permits, which allow merchandise sales. In 1991 Scruggs and sculptor Frederick Hart, whose The Three Soldiers was added to the memorial shortly after its completion to make those it memorializes less abstract, discovered TLF was selling T-shirts with the sculpture on it, without having licensed the image from the sculptor and the VVMF, who jointly owned the copyright, and filed suit against Sampley and TLF for infringement.

Sampley refused multiple offers from Scruggs to settle the case out of court, offering to let him and TLF license the image. He also rebuffed similar efforts by Tom Burch, another outspoken POW/MIA activist, to work out a settlement. Instead, Sampley attacked Hart in his newspaper, noting that by the sculptor's own recollection he had been gassed during antiwar demonstrations in the late 1960s and asserting that Hart had made a large amount of money from others' licensing fees (in fact, he did not keep any of the money he received).

Scruggs came in for some criticism as well. Sampley noted that under the legislation which authorized the memorial, the fund Scruggs started to pay for it should have spent its remaining money and dissolved itself in 1984 after the memorial was completed and opened to the public. Instead, Sampley wrote, Scruggs had turned it into the VVMF and made it permanent, on the argument that some of the memorial's granite panels had already cracked and needed repair.

Sampley noted that money that had been raised from the public to pay for those repairs was instead being spent on high-priced Washington lawyers in the lawsuit. He argued in court that since the statue had been placed on public land and was maintained at public expense, it was a "national symbol" that could not be copyrighted. Nevertheless, he offered to settle the case by having Homecoming II pay for the panel repairs.

In 1993 the federal court hearing the case held for Hart and Scruggs. They were awarded almost $360,000 in unpaid royalties; as part of the judgment they were entitled to seize Sampley's house and business. Records he had filed with the court showed that he had made more money than the judgment from T-shirt sales.

Sampley had formed one company, Red Hawk, to make the T-shirts, which it then sold to Homecoming II, a non-profit POW/MIA organization started by others in the 1980s whose founders had asked Sampley to take control of after a few years. Sampley himself claimed to have almost no money, but Red Hawk grossed almost $2 million over three years (Sampley claimed later that Scruggs's lawyers had deliberately exaggerated that number by including revenues from his for-profit businesses). At the same time, Keating wrote in her book, the Homecoming II volunteers who staffed the booths received nothing beyond free lodging at a house owned by the organization.

Before Hart and Scruggs could collect, however, Sampley, who had vowed never to pay "homage" to Scruggs, shut down both Red Hawk and Homecoming II, transferring their assets to new companies and organizations. By the time collection efforts began, there was nothing to collect. He never paid, and Scruggs and Hart eventually stopped trying to collect.

Sampley did comply with the aspect of the court's ruling enjoining him from further sales of T-shirts with the statue on them. In 1995, as a result of the court's ruling, the NPS banned all organizations with permits to operate booths on the Mall from selling T-shirts, save the company that operates the guest services kiosks; two years later the D.C. Circuit Court of Appeals upheld the ban as not infringing on First Amendment rights. Sampley later attributed the whole affair to his own stubbornness. "It was the biggest mistake of my life", he told the City Paper in 2001.

Scruggs later told Keating that two months before Sampley's death, he ran into him at an event at the memorial, and the two had a pleasant and civil conversation over their mutual heart problems; he recalled that Sampley looked weak. Sampley later donated $5,000 to the foundation for an educational center. Although Sampley never said so, Scruggs believes it was an attempt to reconcile. (Note: Susan Katz Keating also recalls that while Sampley devoted an article in his newspaper to challenging and disputing her book chapter on him, and she was often confronted during her book tour on radio shows and at book signings by people repeating talking points of Sampley's, to the point that her publisher hired bodyguards for her at the latter events, Sampley in private remained cordial and amiable with her.)

=== Attacks on John Kerry and John McCain ===
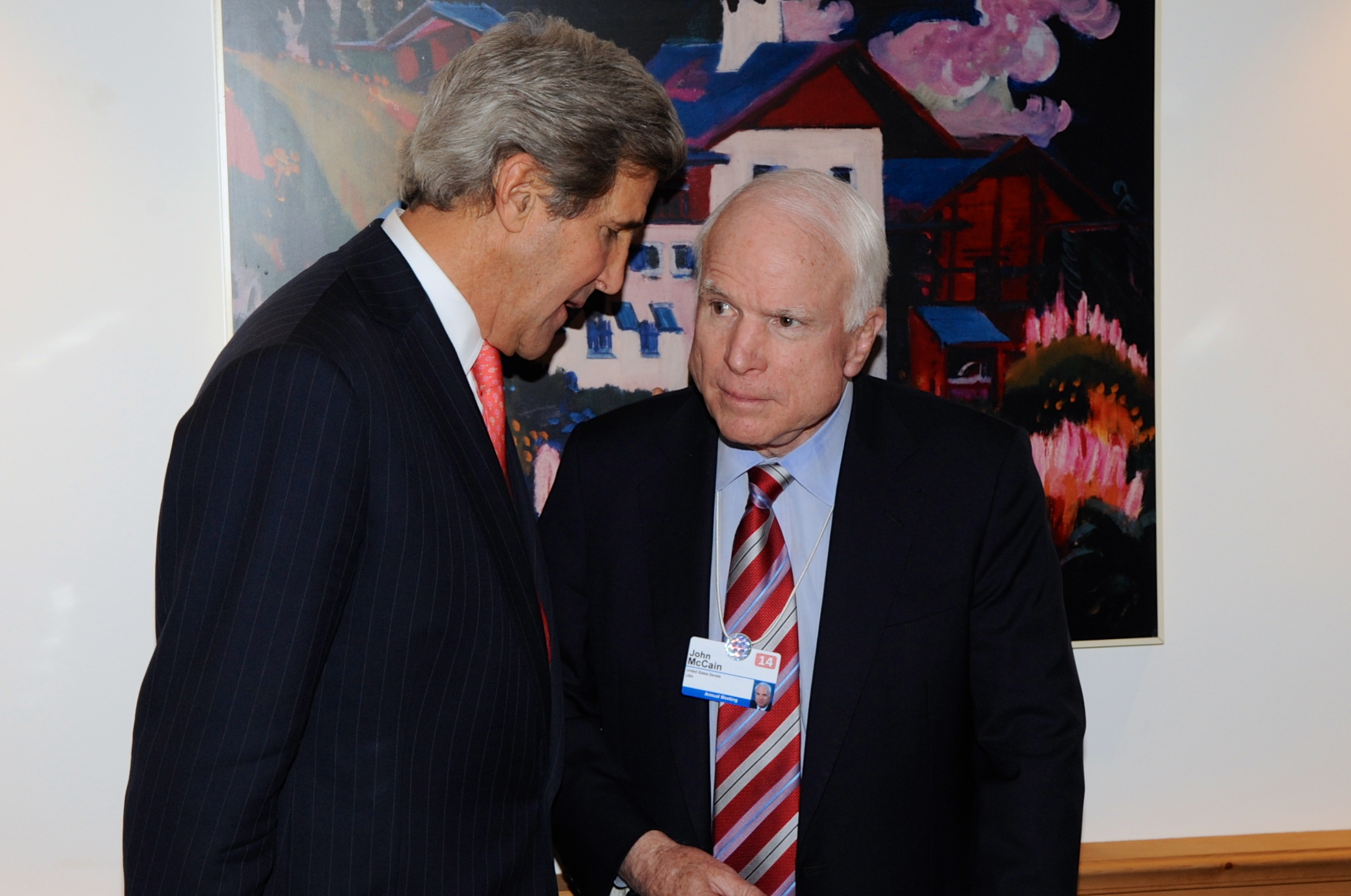
Senators John Kerry (left) and John McCain (shown in 2014), both members of the Select Committee, were attacked by Sampley-led groups when they ran for president.

In 1991, the Senate convened a select committee to examine the POW/MIA issue, chaired by John Kerry and thus known as the Kerry Committee. It began holding hearings during the next Congress. Sampley and other activists were dubious about whether the committee, whose membership included all the sitting senators who were Vietnam-era combat veterans, was really committed to fully investigating the issue. They believed that its true purpose was to resolve the issue by concluding that all POW/MIAs had been accounted for and none were still alive in order to clear a major obstacle to normalizing relations with Vietnam.

The committee did indeed reach a conclusion that if there were any remaining living POWs, there were not many and all the other cases that could be accounted for had been, prompting criticism from one of its members, Bob Smith of New Hampshire, who had introduced the resolution that created the committee. Kerry and John McCain, ranking Republican on the committee and himself a former POW, both rejected claims that the committee had covered up evidence contradictory to that conclusion, or allowed federal officials to lie under oath to the committee. Early in the process, Sampley had called for Kerry to resign after what he alleged was witness tampering by committee staff who reported to him; in response, he claimed, the committee began investigating him and his business activities related to POW/MIA activism; when Keating published her book the next years, with an entire chapter devoted to him, Sampley accused her of doing so at the behest of the Defense Intelligence Agency, which he believed had been trying to discredit him and other activists who believed there were still living POWs.

McCain in particular had drawn the activists' ire early in the hearings. He had stated publicly that most of them were "not zealots in a good cause. They are criminals and some of the most craven, most cynical and most despicable human beings to ever run a scam." McCain also publicly embraced former North Vietnamese Army colonel Bùi Tín while reducing one POW/MIA family member to tears with harsh questioning.

==== Fight with McCain aide ====
As the hearings wound down, in December 1992, Sampley wrote an article about McCain for his newspaper, calling him a "Manchurian candidate", beholden to the Vietnamese and depicting him on the cover with a queen of diamonds in the background, alluding to the film and novel from which the term came. While in Washington, he began leaving copies of his newspaper in every senator's office. Although he intended to skip McCain's, he said later that he had been in a hurry and did not look closely at the name on the door, and thus left one in the Arizona senator's.

McCain's chief of staff, Mark Salter, confronted him when he entered and ordered him to leave, which Sampley said he was already doing when Salter followed him into the hall because, according to Salter, Sampley had told him he had something to tell him. In Sampley's account, that was an invitation to a fistfight outside. Salter, by his own later admission, touched Sampley first, pushing him from behind—after, Sampley wrote, following him down the hall; Salter says he merely tapped Sampley's shoulder. In response, Sampley "decked" him.

Capitol police intervened and arrested Sampley after, he claimed, Salter misrepresented the situation. After two days in jail, he was released. Salter asked him if he would agree to stay away from the senator and his staff, but Sampley refused, so he pressed the assault charge. The judge at trial took Salter's word, and sentenced Sampley to time served and 180 days' probation. He also issued a restraining order similarly barring Sampley from contact with McCain or his staff.

==== McCain and Kerry presidential campaigns ====
In 2000 McCain sought the Republican presidential nomination. Sampley and other veterans still angry with the senator over his 1993 performance formed Vietnam Veterans Against John McCain. On his newspaper's website, Sampley posted a page of links to articles by himself and others, going back to 1997, criticizing McCain's service as a POW. In 1993 during the hearings, Sampley claimed, McCain along with Rep. Pete Peterson, another former Vietnam POW who became the first postwar U.S. ambassador to Vietnam, had privately beseeched the Vietnamese government to never make its files on American POWs public. Sampley suggested that during his confinement, McCain had collaborated with the Vietnamese at one point in exchange for medical treatment, (Note: Keating not only casts doubt on this characterization of McCain as POW, noting that he was so resistant that the Vietnamese at one point transferred him to a special prison to attempt to break him, she contrasts Sampley's criticism with his defense of Bobby Garwood, a Marine POW returned in 1979 against whom collaboration allegations were credible enough that he was court-martialed, as doing what he needed to do to survive.) and wanted to prevent that from becoming public knowledge.

Four years later, Kerry, a Navy veteran of the war who had called Sampley a "stupid ass" in response to his attacks on McCain, won the Democratic nomination for president. Sampley helped organize Vietnam Veterans Against John Kerry and disseminated material disparaging the Massachusetts senator's antiwar activism as unpatriotic and a betrayal of his fellow veterans. McCain came to Kerry's defense, saying that Sampley was "the most despicable person I have ever had the misfortune to encounter." Sampley called the remark "unbecoming" a senator and later addressed it more specifically: "What does that say about his relationship with the Vietnamese prison guards whom he claims brutally tortured him daily?"

In 2008, McCain again ran for president and this time won his party's nomination, although he lost to Democrat Barack Obama in the general election. Once again, Sampley organized efforts to oppose him and distributed his accusations of collaboration, this time in the form of Vetting John McCain, a self-published book. He was joined by other veterans who had supported the effort before and former Republican congressmen Bill Hendon and John LeBoutillier, who had strongly supported the cause of POW/MIA activists during brief House terms in the early 1980s. "He took away the only leverage we had for getting those soldiers back", Sampley told the New York Daily News, referring to McCain's role in normalizing relations with Vietnam in the 1990s. "Why? He was paying back the Vietnamese for keeping quiet about him."

In his 2002 memoir Worth the Fighting For, McCain's opinion of Sampley was mutual:

[He] was quite a character ... I took him for a charlatan within five minutes of meeting him. And nothing he has done since has caused me to change that opinion ... During our hearings, he would boo or hiss every witness who cast doubt on the conspiracy theory or every time I would ask a skeptical question. He liked to give me the finger once or twice a day, and I would usually give it right back.

McCain wrote that he later decided to take Sampley's accusations in stride, referring to himself as the "Manchurian Candidate" in speeches "probably more often than Sampley has repeated the accusation." It was repeated and disseminated among McCain's critics after Sampley's death, especially during the administration of Donald Trump, whom McCain had criticized frequently until his own death in 2018.

== CSS Neuse replica and local activism ==
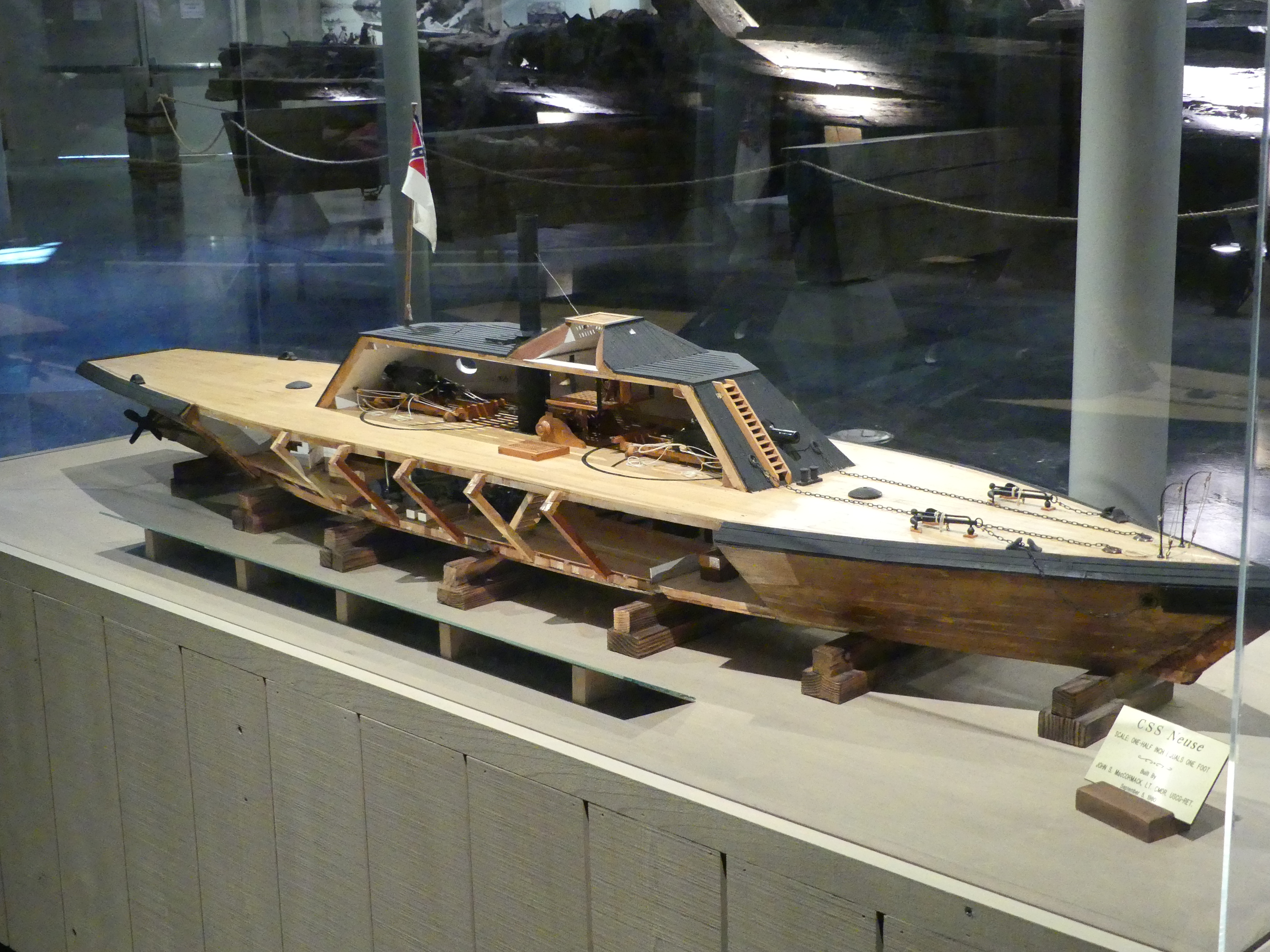
Model of CSS Neuse at Kinston museum

Sampley was also involved in efforts to revitalize downtown Kinston, where he owned several other businesses besides his pottery shop. In 1991 the Lenoir County Chamber of Commerce recognized his efforts. The following year the Raleigh News & Observer honored Sampley as a "Tar Heel of the Week".

In the late 1990s, he grew disgusted with the sight of one overgrown vacant lot on a major intersection. He proposed to a group of Kinstonians he assembled at a local cafe that they organize to build a life-size replica of the CSS Neuse, an early ironclad of the Confederate States Navy whose remains are listed on the National Register of Historic Places, and put it on the lot as a tourist attraction.

Listeners were doubtful, but two weeks later, at their next gathering, Sampley was accompanied by Alton Stapleford, a retired master boat builder. He explained how it could be done, and in 2002 the Neuse II Foundation was established and construction began. Local volunteers spent the next several months putting timbers into place; the 158-foot (48 m) replica is the only full-size replica of a Confederate ironclad. It opened to tourists in 2009.

In the 1990s the state's Department of Natural and Cultural Resources had built the first structure to house the remaining hull of the original Neuse on another lot in downtown Kinston. Sampley and other local historians believed that site possibly also contained the true grave of North Carolina's first governor, Richard Caswell, who had also done the original land survey of Kinston. Sampley announced a contest to find that site, with the state to judge the winner; however officials at the department were angry that he did so without informing them. Sampley was unperturbed: "It's a question the state should have answered a long time ago", he wrote.

In 2004 Sampley and a fellow activist pressured both the Lenoir County commissioners and the Kinston city council to pass a resolution stating that God was the foundation of American government and that the Founding Fathers had never intended for the modern degree of separation of church and state. It was modeled on a resolution that had recently been passed in Greene County, Tennessee. While it passed the city council unanimously, many members said they felt they had been "coerced" into doing so by Sampley's tactics. "I feel like I have a very strong belief in God.", said one. "But I don't like getting stuff like this crammed down my throat."

== Personal life and death ==
Sampley was married twice. He had two children by his first wife, Kiku Uehara, who was from Okinawa; the couple later divorced. Both Kiku and her daughter with Sampley predeceased him.

Later he married Robin Owen, daughter of Army officer Robert Owen, who went missing in Laos in 1968. They had a son together before divorcing in the 1990s. Sampley continued to wear the POW/MIA bracelet with his former father-in-law's name on it afterwards.

Sampley died on May 12, 2009, at the Veterans Affairs Medical Center in Durham, North Carolina, of complications from heart surgery. He was interred at Dyson Cemetery in Ivanhoe, with full military honors.
