= A Good Night to Die =

- Directed by: Craig Singer
- Screenplay by: Robert Dean Klein
- Produced by: Paul Colichman; Stephen P. Jarchow; Chris Williams
- Starring: Michael Rapaport; Gary Stretch; Ally Sheedy; Ralph Macchio; Debbie Harry; Robin Givens; Seymour Cassel; Frank Whaley; Lainie Kazan
- Cinematography: John Sosenko
- Edited by: Cass Vanini
- Music by: Bee and Flower
- Production company: Regent Entertainment
- Distributed by: DEJ Productions
- Release date: May 3, 2003 (Tribeca)
- Running time: 100 minutes
- Country: United States
- Language: English

A Good Night to Die is a 2003 American action comedy thriller film directed by Craig Singer and starring Michael Rapaport, Gary Stretch, Ally Sheedy, Ralph Macchio, Debbie Harry, Robin Givens, Seymour Cassel, Frank Whaley and Lainie Kazan.

== Cast ==
- Michael Rapaport as August
- Gary Stretch as Ronnie
- Robin Givens as Dana
- Ally Sheedy as Marie
- Ralph Macchio as Donnie
- Debbie Harry as Madison
- Seymour Cassel as Guy
- Lainie Kazan as Diane
- Frank Whaley as Chad
- James Russo as Roy
- Reg E. Cathey as Avi
