= CSS Neuse =

Confederate ironclad

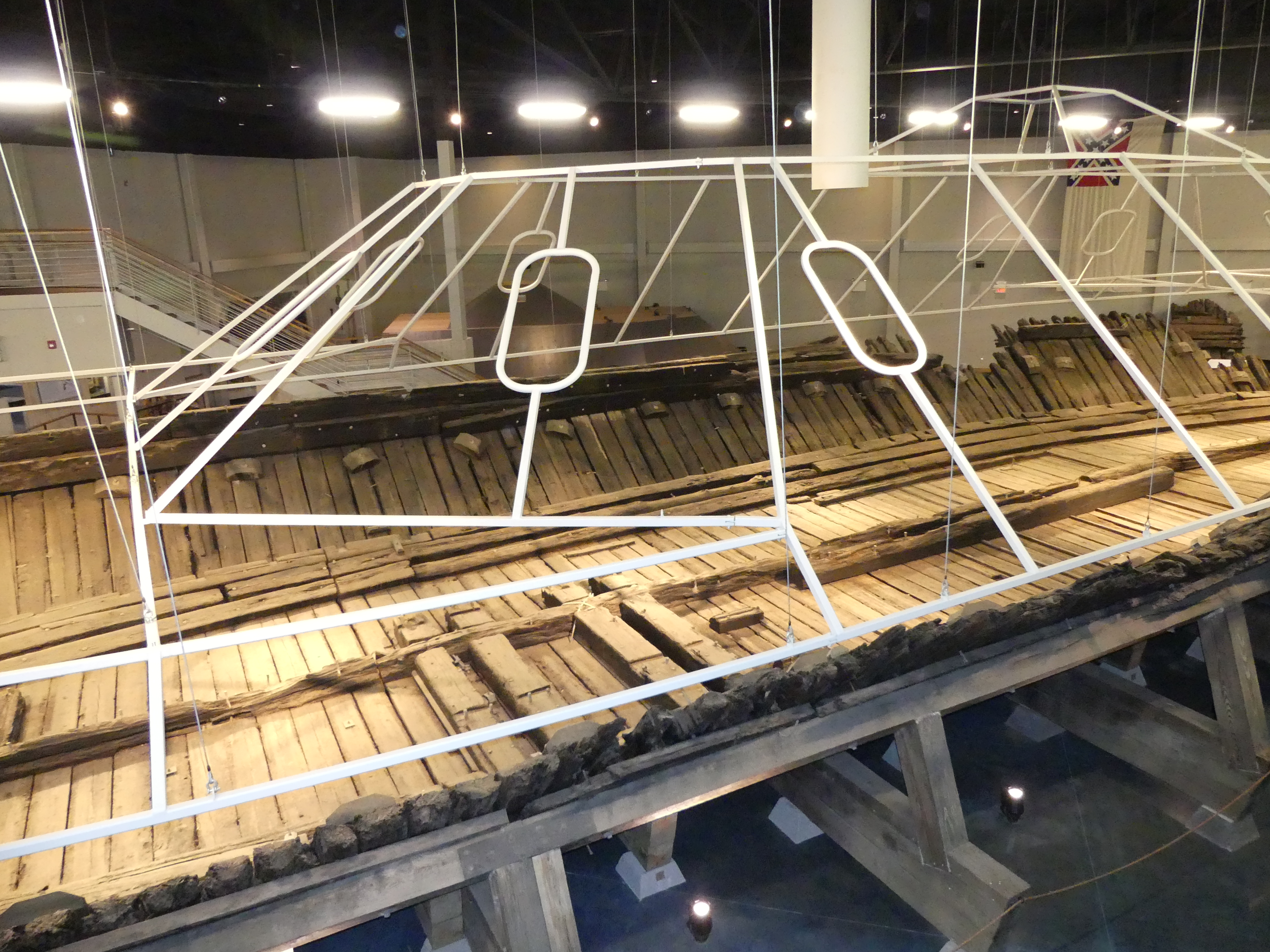
- Lower hull of CSS Neuse

History

Confederate States
- Namesake: Neuse River
- Builder: Howard and Ellis, Kinston, North Carolina
- Launched: November 1863
- Commissioned: April 1864
- Fate: Burned to prevent capture, March 1865
- Status: Hull raised and on display in Kinston, North Carolina.

General characteristics
- Type: Albemarle-class ironclad ram
- Length: 152 ft (46 m)
- Beam: 34 ft (10 m)
- Draft: 9 ft (2.7 m)
- Armament: 2 × 6.4 in (160 mm) Brooke rifles
- CSS Neuse (Ironclad Gunboat)
- U.S. National Register of Historic Places
- Location within North Carolina
- Nearest city: Kinston, North Carolina
- Coordinates: 35°15′37.47″N 77°34′53.20″W
- Area: 0.3 acres (0.12 ha)
- Built: 1865
- Architect: Confederate Navy Dept.; Howard & Ellis
- NRHP reference No.: 00000444
- Added to NRHP: June 11, 2001

CSS Neuse (/nuːs/ NOOSE) was a steam-powered ironclad ram of the Confederate States Navy that served in the latter part the American Civil War and was eventually scuttled in the Neuse River to avoid capture by rapidly advancing Union Army forces. In the early 1960s, she produced approximately 15,000 artifacts from her raised lower hull, the largest number ever found on a recovered Confederate vessel. The remains of her lower hull and a selection of her artifacts are on exhibit in Kinston, North Carolina at the CSS Neuse Civil War Museum, a North Carolina State Historic Site. The ironclad is listed on the National Register of Historic Places.

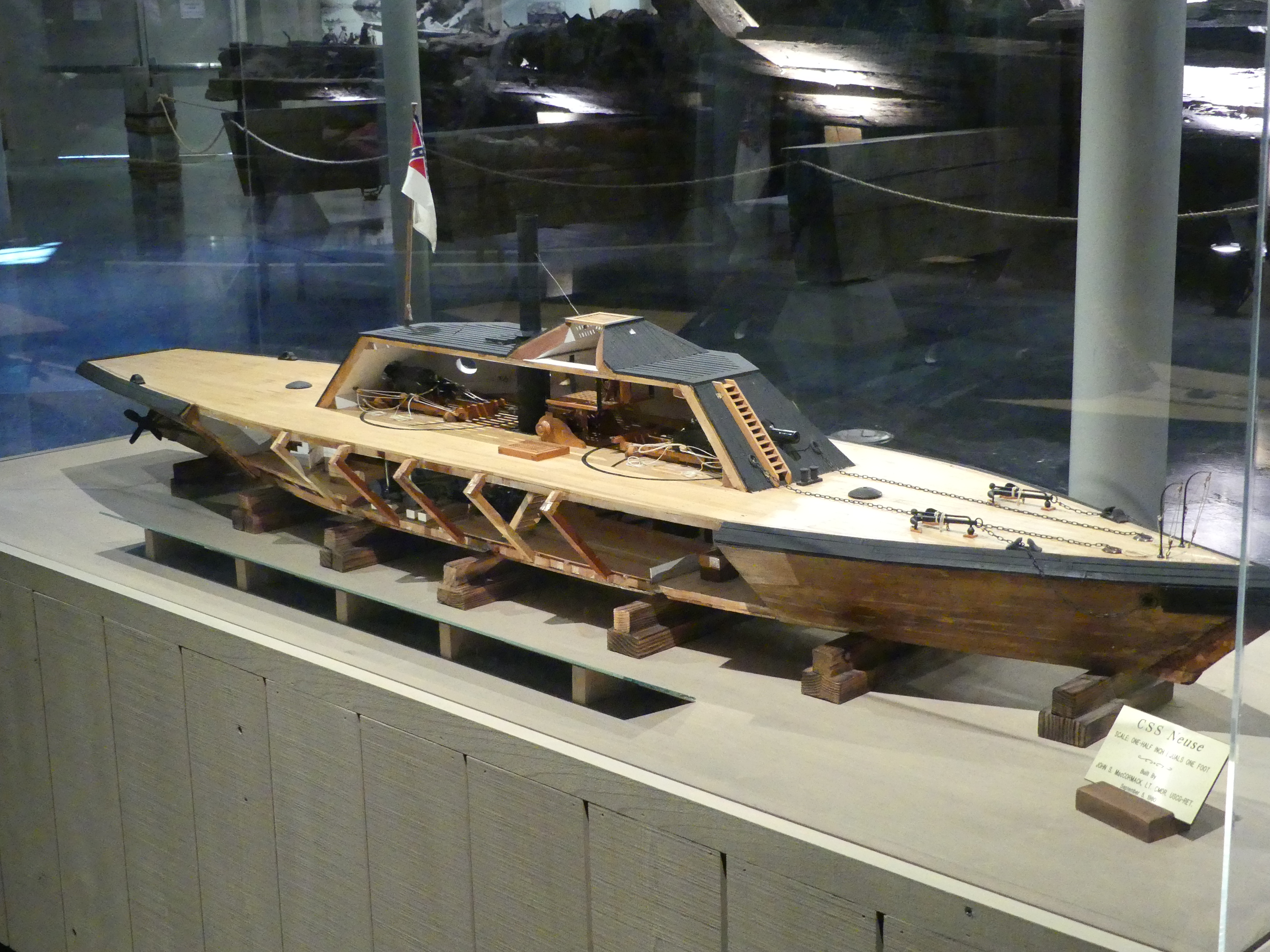
Model of CSS Neuse

== Construction ==
A contract for the construction of Neuse was signed on 17 October 1862 between the shipbuilding company of Thomas Howard and Elijah Ellis and the Confederate Navy. Work began in October of that year on the bank across the Neuse River (her namesake) from the small village of Whitehall, North Carolina (present day Seven Springs). The gunboat's design was virtually identical to her sister ironclad CSS Albemarle, but Neuse differed from Albemarle by having four additional gun ports added (for a total of ten) to her eight-sided armored casemate. The hull was 158 feet (48.2 m) long by 34 feet (10.4 m) wide, and she was constructed mostly of locally abundant pine, with some 4 inches (102 mm) of oak used as sturdy backing for her 4-inch-thick wrought iron armor. Many delays in construction were incurred by a lack of available materials, mostly the iron plate for her armored casemate and deck; her deck armor was finally left off so the ironclad could be completed and put in service. Due to continuing iron plate shortages, Neuse became the first of several Southern ironclads built with unarmored decks. This situation was compounded by the Confederate Army exercising priority over the Navy in the use of the South's inadequate railroad system for transporting vital war material.

== Ordnance and projectiles ==
Neuse was equipped with two 6.4-inch (163 mm) Brooke rifled cannon (similar to a Parrott rifle); each double-banded cannon weighed more than 12,000 pounds (5,400 kg) with its pivot carriage and other attached hardware. Both cannons were positioned along the ironclad's center-line in the armored casemate, one forward, the other aft. The field of fire for both pivot rifles was 180-degrees, from port to starboard: Each cannon could fire from one of five gun port positions or could deliver a two-cannon broadside. Neuse's projectiles consisted of explosive shells, anti-personnel canister shot, grape shot, and blunt-nosed, solid wrought iron "bolts" for use against Union armored ships; many examples of all four types were recovered from her raised wreck.

== Service and post-war history ==
Launched in November 1863 while still needing fitting out, Neuse finally got up steam in April 1864 for duty on the inland waters of North Carolina as part of the force under Commander R. F. Pinkney, CSN. Shortly thereafter, the ironclad grounded off Kinston due to her mostly inexperienced crew, which had been conscripted from the Confederate Army; she remained fast in the mud for almost a month until finally being refloated. After that, due to a lack of available Confederate Army shore support, she never left the river area around Kinston, serving instead as a floating ironclad fortification. In March 1865, with Kinston under siege by Union forces, gunpowder trails were laid down which led to a cache of explosives placed in her bow; the crew then lit fires astern and amidships, and she was destroyed a short time later by fire, then a bow explosion. Neuse burned to just below her waterline and then sank into the river mud preventing capture by the rapidly advancing Union Army forces, commanded by Major General John M. Schofield. At some point following the war, her sunken hulk, lying in shallow river water and mud, was salvaged of its valuable metals: cannon, carriages and their fittings, anchors, iron ram, casemate armor, both propellers and their shafts, and her steam power plant. Whatever bits and pieces remained, including her projectiles, lay undisturbed in and around the wreck until Neuse was raised nearly a century later.

== Ironclad recovery ==
After nearly a century, the remaining lower hull of the ironclad was discovered and then raised in 1963; approximately 15,000 shipboard artifacts were recovered and carefully cataloged. Neuse's hull was then temporarily installed in the Governor Caswell Memorial, beside the river, in Kinston. Since 2013, Neuse and her artifacts have been on display in a new, climate-controlled building in downtown Kinston.

There are currently only four recovered Civil War era ironclad wrecks, CSS Neuse, CSS Muscogee (also called CSS Jackson in some texts), USS Monitor, and USS Cairo; Cairo remains the only recovered ironclad wreck left partially exposed outdoors under cover in the sometimes brutal southern climate. Other Union and Confederate ironclad wreck sites are known but remain untouched. The successful Confederate submarine H. L. Hunley, which sank the Union blockading sloop-of-war USS Housatonic, was recovered and is undergoing extensive restoration and long term conservation at the Warren Lasch Conservation Center in North Charleston, South Carolina.

== Neuse II replica ==
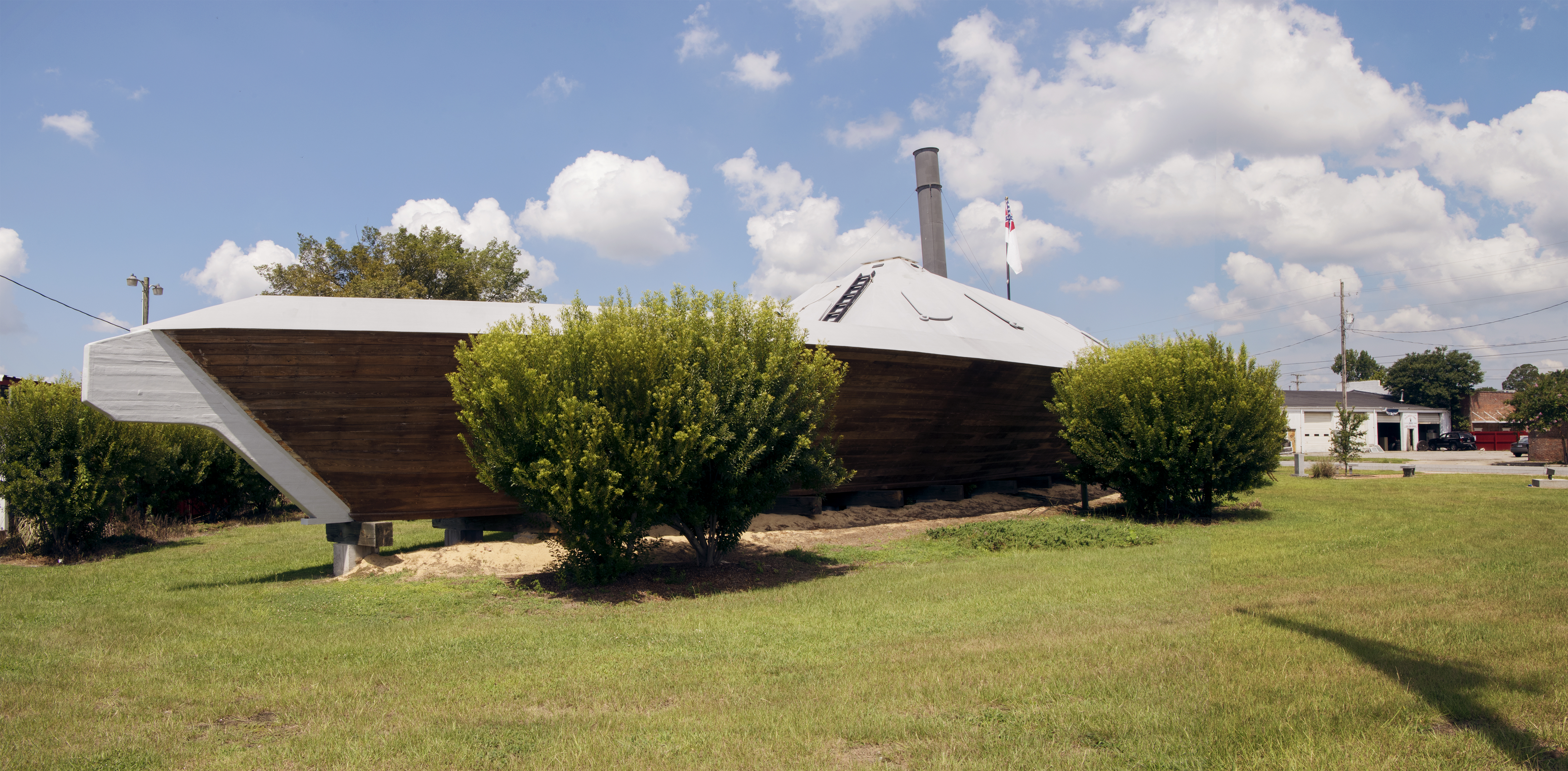
The Neuse II replica

A replica of the CSS Neuse, better known as CSS Neuse II, was the brainchild of Kinston activist and businessman Ted Sampley and built by Alton Stapleford. Neuse II is on grounds display at a separate site in Kinston and contains a complete fitted-out interior that shows all shipboard details; she was constructed by volunteers from 2002 to 2009. Neuse is the only Confederate ironclad that has a historic, full-size replica on display. Since April 2002 Neuse's sister ironclad, CSS Albemarle has had a 3/8 scale replica, 63 feet (19 m) long, at anchor near the Port O' Plymouth Museum in Plymouth, North Carolina. This ironclad replica is self-powered and capable of sailing on the river.
