= The Last P.O.W.? The Bobby Garwood Story =

- Screenplay by: John Pielmeier
- Story by: Edward Gold; John Pielmeier
- Directed by: Georg Stanford Brown
- Starring: Ralph Macchio; Martin Sheen
- Composer: Mark Snow
- Original language: English

Production
- Producer: Charles Fries
- Cinematography: Joseph M. Wilcots
- Editor: Barry L. Gold

Original release
- Network: ABC
- Release: June 27, 1993

The Last P.O.W.? The Bobby Garwood Story, also known as Garwood: Prisoner of War, is a 1993 American television drama film directed by Georg Stanford Brown. It stars Ralph Macchio and Martin Sheen, and is based on real life events of Robert R. Garwood.

== Cast ==
- Ralph Macchio as Robert Garwood
- Martin Sheen as Ike Eisenbraun
- Noah Blake as Russ Grisset
- Le Tuan as Ho
- Steve Park as Hom
- Joseph Hieu as Scarface
- Henry Beckman as Psychiatrist
- John Archie as P.O.W. 1
- Juan F. Cejas as P.O.W. 2
- Carl Cofield as P.O.W. 3
- Steve DuMouchel as P.O.W. 4
- Ramon Estevez as P.O.W. 5
- Jeremy Kerns as P.O.W. 6
