= Ralph Macchio =

American actor (born 1961)

- Macchio in 2026
- Born: Ralph George Macchio Jr. November 4, 1961 (age 65); Huntington, New York, U.S.
- Education: Half Hollow Hills High School West in Dix Hills, New York
- Occupation: Actor
- Years active: 1979–present
- Notable work: The Outsiders; The Karate Kid; My Cousin Vinny
- Spouse: Phyllis Fierro (m. 1987)
- Children: 2
- Macchio's voice Macchio speaks on the historical significance of the National Film Registry. Recorded January 29, 2026

Ralph George Macchio Jr. (/ˈmɑː.tʃi.oʊ/, MAH-chee-oh; Italian: [ˈmakkjo]; born November 4, 1961) is an American actor. He is best known for portraying Daniel LaRusso in four Karate Kid films (1984–2025) and in Cobra Kai (2018–2025), a sequel television series. For his work in the latter, Macchio was nominated for two Critics' Choice Awards and a Primetime Emmy Award. He is also known for portraying Johnny Cade in Francis Ford Coppola's ensemble 1983 film, The Outsiders, and Bill Gambini in Joe Pesci's 1992 film My Cousin Vinny. Additional notable performances were in Eight Is Enough (1980–1981), Crossroads (1986), Ugly Betty (2008–2009), and The Deuce (2017–2019). He has also worked as a director and has produced two short films. Macchio received a star on the Hollywood Walk of Fame in 2024.

== Early life ==
Macchio was born in Huntington, New York, a suburb of New York City, on November 4, 1961. He is the son of Rosalie (née DeSantis) and Ralph George Macchio Sr., who owned a few laundromats and a wastewater disposal company. Macchio has a younger brother named Steven. Ralph Sr. is of half Italian and half Greek descent while Rosalie is of Italian ancestry. In a 1980 screen test, Macchio said that his family was from Naples. In 1979, Macchio graduated from Half Hollow Hills High School West in Dix Hills, New York.

Macchio began tap dancing lessons at age three and was discovered by a talent agent at age 16. He also learned a small amount of karate and jiujitsu in elementary school.

== Career ==
Macchio is known for appearing to be younger than he actually is and for portraying characters who are younger than he is. At age 20, he played a 16-year-old Johnny Cade in The Outsiders. At age 22, he played the 17-year-old Daniel LaRusso for the first time in The Karate Kid.

=== Eight Is Enough and The Outsiders ===
Macchio's first role came in a 1980 Bubble Yum commercial. That same year, Macchio was cast as Jeremy Andretti in the final season of Eight Is Enough. He next won the role of Johnny Cade in Francis Ford Coppola's 1983 cinematic adaptation of S. E. Hinton's novel, The Outsiders, and shared the screen with an ensemble cast that included Tom Cruise, Matt Dillon, Emilio Estevez, Leif Garrett, C. Thomas Howell, Diane Lane, Rob Lowe, and Patrick Swayze.

=== Daniel LaRusso ===
==== Original Karate Kid films ====
Macchio's work on The Outsiders helped him win the role of Daniel LaRusso in the 1984 blockbuster film The Karate Kid. Macchio continued to portray the character in two of its sequels, The Karate Kid Part II (1986) and The Karate Kid Part III (1989). In The Karate Kid, he portrayed a "high school weakling turned bullybuster" who learns karate from his friend and mentor, Mr. Miyagi (portrayed by Pat Morita). Macchio's work in the Karate Kid series made him "stratospherically famous."

Macchio appeared in the 2007 music video for the song "Sweep the Leg" by No More Kings as a caricature of himself and Daniel LaRusso.

In June 2010, Macchio appeared in Funny or Die's online short, "Wax On, F*ck Off", where his loved ones stage an intervention to turn the former child star from a well-adjusted family man into an addict besieged with tabloid scandal in order to help his career, with frequent references to The Karate Kid. A recurring joke in the sketch is that Macchio is confused for an adolescent. The short was lauded by TV Guide's Bruce Fretts, who referred to the video as "sidesplitting" and "comic gold."

In 2013, Macchio appeared in How I Met Your Mother. One of the main characters, Barney Stinson, asserts that Macchio's character, Daniel LaRusso, in The Karate Kid is not the real karate kid; instead, it is Johnny Lawrence, Daniel's nemesis in the film. That same year, he also voiced Daniel LaRusso along with a few other characters in an episode of Robot Chicken. During a celebration of the 30th anniversary of The Karate Kid at the Japanese American National Museum in 2014, Macchio said that the yellow 1947 Ford Super Deluxe convertible that his character Daniel receives from Mr. Miyagi in the first film was sitting in his garage.

==== Cobra Kai ====
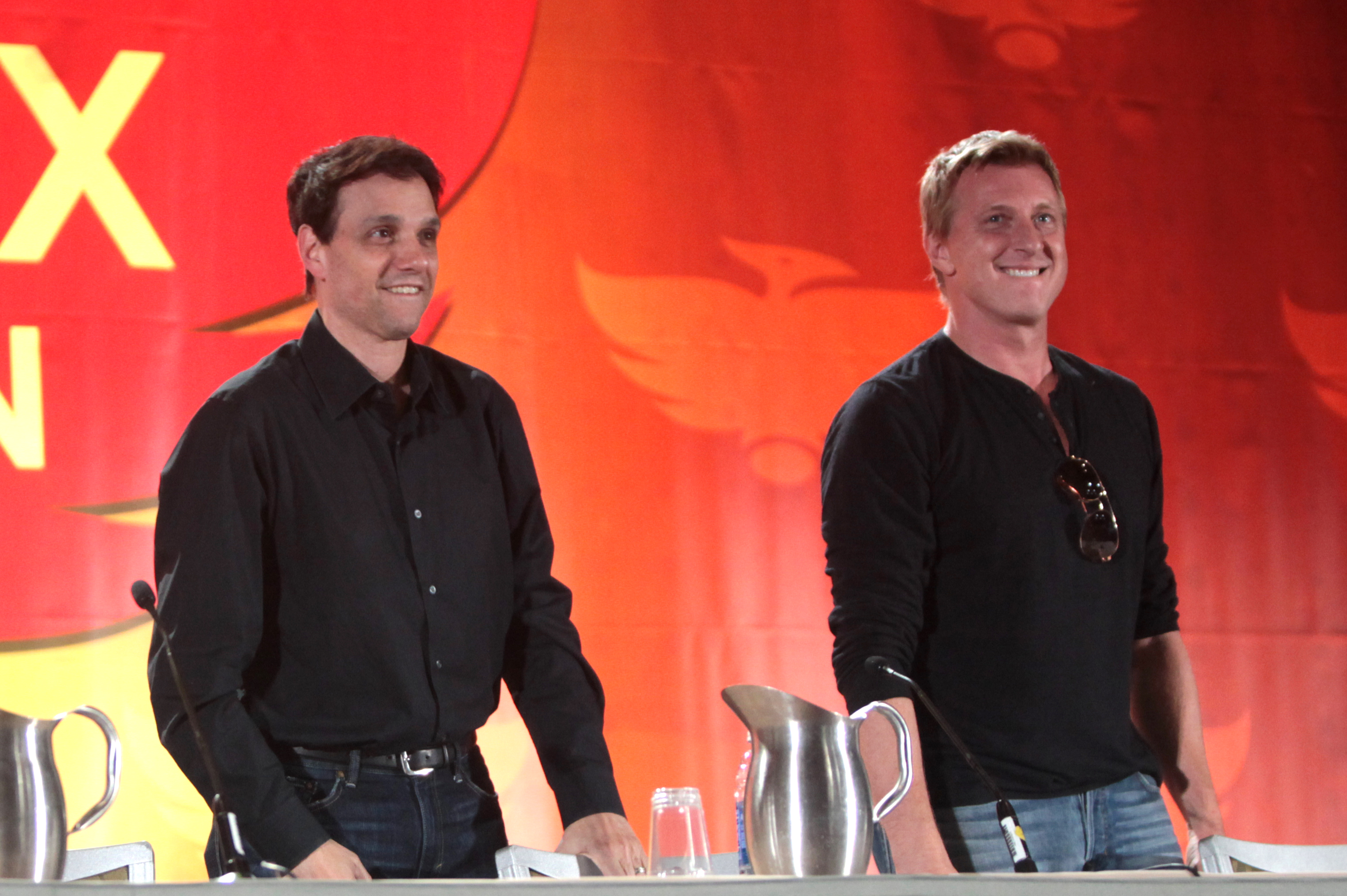
Macchio with William Zabka in 2016

From 2018 to 2025, Macchio reprised the role of Daniel LaRusso for the martial arts comedy drama television series Cobra Kai created by Josh Heald, Jon Hurwitz, and Hayden Schlossberg, and distributed by Sony Pictures Television. Cobra Kai premiered on May 2, 2018, and concluded on February 13, 2025, after six seasons consisting of 65 episodes. Originally released on YouTube Red / YouTube Premium for its first two seasons, the series later moved to Netflix. Cobra Kai re-examines The Karate Kid films as Johnny Lawrence's "redemption story" that questions his role as a villain and also introduces the struggles that both Daniel and Johnny face with their respective father figures.

In 2022, Macchio published his memoir Waxing On: The Karate Kid and Me, where he reflects upon the legacy of the Karate Kid films and Cobra Kai. The book went on to become a New York Times best seller.

==== Karate Kid: Legends ====
In 2025, Macchio teamed up with Jackie Chan to again reprise the role of Daniel LaRusso in Karate Kid: Legends.

=== Other roles ===
In 1986, Macchio appeared in the film Crossroads, portraying music student Eugene Martone. That same year, Macchio starred in Cuba and His Teddy Bear on Broadway, alongside Robert De Niro.

In 1992, Macchio starred opposite Joe Pesci and Marisa Tomei in the hit comedy film My Cousin Vinny, playing Billy Gambini, who was wrongfully accused of murder while passing through a small Alabama town.

In 1996, Macchio performed the lead role of J. Pierrepont Finch in the U.S. tour revival of the 1962 Tony Award-winning musical How to Succeed in Business Without Really Trying, and received positive reviews. Referring to his performance as a chorister in a high school production of the same musical, Macchio said, "I was known as the 'Dancing Kid,' not that I was all that great. But I had been dancing since the age of three, taking lessons at the June Claire School of Dance in Babylon, Long Island."

In 2005, Macchio played himself in the HBO series Entourage. Beginning in October 2008, Macchio appeared in several episodes of the ABC Network television series Ugly Betty as Archie Rodriguez, a local politician who is Hilda's love interest.

On September 20, 2010, Macchio played the adult Carl Morelli in a staged reading of the Charles Messina play A Room of My Own presented by The Bleecker Street Theatre Company. His Funny or Die video entitled Wax On, F*ck Off, became a viral sensation in 2010. In February 2011, it was announced that Macchio would compete on ABC's Dancing with the Stars. He was eliminated during the semi-finals, placing fourth in the overall competition. Macchio appeared in Canadian band Danko Jones' music videos for "Had Enough" and "I Think Bad Thoughts."

In April 2012, Macchio was cast in the film Hitchcock, based on the non-fiction book Alfred Hitchcock and the Making of Psycho. He portrayed Psycho screenwriter Joseph Stefano. Some of his other film credits include Distant Thunder, Naked in New York, A Good Night to Die, Beer League and both Too Much Sun and Up the Academy with Robert Downey Jr. From 2017 to 2019, Macchio had a reucuring role as Officer Haddix on The Deuce.

Macchio has directed two short films: Love Thy Brother (2002) and Across The Alley (2013); both won awards at U.S.-based film festivals.

=== 2024–present ===
Macchio was given a star on the Hollywood Walk of Fame in November 2024. In October 2024, he was featured prominently in the music video of the Coldplay song "The Karate Kid". Macchio later joined the band on stage to perform the song during a show in Melbourne, Australia.

== Personal life ==
Macchio was introduced to his future wife, Phyllis Fierro, by his grandmother when he was 15. They got married on April 5, 1987, and have two children together: Julia (b. 1992) and Daniel (b. 1996). Fierro is a nurse practitioner. Julia appeared in seasons 4 and 5 of Cobra Kai, portraying her father's character's cousin named Vanessa LaRusso.

Macchio is a fan of the New York Islanders hockey team and was featured as the team's celebrity captain in the 1991 Pro Set Platinum trading card series. A 2016 bobblehead promotion saw his likeness in the team's uniform performing the iconic 'crane kick' pose from The Karate Kid. On March 18, 2018, Macchio threw out the ceremonial first pitch at a New York Mets game with William Zabka serving as the catcher.

Macchio earned his black belt in karate in April 2025, a little more than 40 years after portraying Daniel LaRusso in The Karate Kid. In 2023, Macchio said that before the filming, he was trained in the Okinawan Gōjū-ryū defensive style of karate used by Pat Morita's Mr. Miyagi character. In May 2025, Macchio and his Karate Kid: Legends co-star Jackie Chan were awarded an honorary black belt by the World Karate Federation during the film's New York premiere. Macchio still trains regularly as of 2025 and has credited the sport for helping him stay in shape. In 2022, Macchio was inducted into the Suffolk Sports Hall of Fame, and was honored as a special recognition inductee "for his contribution to martial arts and sporting culture in America and beyond."

Macchio is involved with multiple charities that support medical research and children's causes, such as the Cantor Fitzgerald Relief Fund and the Maurer Foundation. In 2016, he took part in a benefit featuring a screening of The Karate Kid to raise funds for a local wildlife rescue center. Macchio is also a strong advocate of breast health education and prevention due to his wife having a breast cancer scare in the past.

== Filmography ==
=== Film ===
| Year | Title | Role | Notes |
|---|---|---|---|
| 1980 | Up the Academy | Chooch Bambalazi | |
| 1982 | High Powder | Eddie | Television film |
| 1982 | Dangerous Company | Denny Brody | Television film |
| 1983 | The Outsiders | Johnny Cade | |
| 1984 | The Karate Kid | Daniel LaRusso | |
| 1984 | Teachers | Eddie Pilikian | |
| 1984 | The Three Wishes of Billy Grier | Billy Grier | Television film |
| 1986 | Crossroads | Eugene Martone | |
| 1986 | The Karate Kid Part II | Daniel LaRusso | |
| 1988 | Distant Thunder | Jack Lambert | |
| 1989 | The Karate Kid Part III | Daniel LaRusso | |
| 1991 | Too Much Sun | Frank Jr. | |
| 1992 | The Last P.O.W.? The Bobby Garwood Story | Robert Garwood | Television film |
| 1992 | My Cousin Vinny | Bill Gambini | |
| 1993 | Naked in New York | Chris | |
| 1996 | Journey Home: The Animals of Farthing Wood | Fox | Voice, direct-to-video |
| 1998 | Dizzyland | N/A | Short film |
| 1998 | The Secret of NIMH 2: Timmy to the Rescue | Timmy Brisby | Voice, direct-to-video |
| 1999 | Can't Be Heaven | Hubbie Darling | |
| 2000 | The Office Party | Sean | Short film |
| 2001 | Popcorn Shrimp | Cop #2 | Short film |
| 2003 | A Good Night to Die | Donnie | |
| 2006 | Beer League | Maz | |
| 2009 | Rosencrantz and Guildenstern Are Undead | Bobby Bianchi | |
| 2010 | Wax On, F*ck Off | Himself, concept writer | Short film |
| 2012 | Hitchcock | Joseph Stefano | |
| 2012 | Holiday Spin | Ruben | Television film |
| 2013 | He's Way More Famous Than You | Himself | |
| 2013 | Across Grace Alley | Father | Short film |
| 2014 | A Little Game | Tom | |
| 2015 | Lost Cat Corona | Dominic | |
| 2017 | Psych: The Movie | Nick Conforth | Television film |
| 2018 | A Dog and Pony Show | Aaron | |
| 2025 | Karate Kid: Legends | Daniel LaRusso | Also executive producer |
| 2026 | The Girl in the River | Colin Ripley | |

=== Television ===
| Year | Title | Role | Notes |
|---|---|---|---|
| 1980–1981 | Eight Is Enough | Jeremy Andretti | Recurring role (19 episodes) |
| 1982 | CBS Afternoon Playhouse | Tony Barnett | Episode: "Journey to Survival" |
| 1999 | The Outer Limits | Dr. Neal Eberhardt | Episode: "The Other Side" |
| 2000 | Chicken Soup for the Soul | Max | Episode: "Letters to Suzie" |
| 2000 | Twice in a Lifetime | Officer Dan Payello/Phillip Barbosa | Episode: "My Blue Heaven" |
| 2005 | Entourage | Himself | Episode: "Aquamansion" |
| 2007 | Head Case | Himself | Episode: "Ralph Macchio and Liz Phair" |
| 2008–2009 | Ugly Betty | Archie Rodriguez | Recurring role (11 episodes) |
| 2010 | Law & Order: Criminal Intent | Louis Marciano | Episode: "Inhumane Society" |
| 2010 | Psych | Nick Conforth | Episode: "We'd Like to Thank the Academy" |
| 2011 | The Whole Truth | Frankie Berlito | Episode: "Lost in Translation" |
| 2011 | Dancing with the Stars | Himself (contestant) | Placed in fourth (17 episodes) |
| 2012 | Happily Divorced | Frankie | Episodes: "Two Guys, a Girl and a Pizza Place" (Parts 1 & 2) |
| 2013 | Robot Chicken | Daniel LaRusso, Colonel Steven Shay, Janitor | Voice, episode: "Caffeine-Induced Aneurysm" |
| 2013 | How I Met Your Mother | Himself | Episode: "The Bro Mitzvah" |
| 2014 | Psych | Logan Phelps | Episode: "Remake A.K.A. Cloudy... With a Chance of Improvement" |
| 2016 | Comedy Central Roast of Rob Lowe | Himself/roaster | Television special |
| 2017–2019 | The Deuce | Officer Haddix | Recurring role (17 episodes) |
| 2017 | Whose Line Is It Anyway? | Himself | Special Guest (Season 13, Episode 8) |
| 2018 | Kevin Can Wait | Alviti | Episodes: "The Smoking Bun" and "Phat Monkey" |
| 2018 | Conan | Himself | Episode: "Conan Without Borders: Japan"; pre-recorded video clip |
| 2018–2025 | Cobra Kai | Daniel LaRusso | Main role; also executive producer and director (episode: "Sleeper") |

== Theatre ==
| Year | Production | Role | Theater |
|---|---|---|---|
| 1986 | Cuba and his Teddy Bear | Teddy | The Public Theater |
| 1996–1997 | How to Succeed in Business Without Really Trying | J. Pierrepont Finch | US national tour |

== Music videos ==
Music videos
| Year | Title | Artist | Role |
|---|---|---|---|
| 2007 | "Sweep the Leg" | No More Kings | Himself / Daniel LaRusso |
| 2010 | "Had Enough" | Danko Jones | Dr. Lee Dorian |
| 2011 | "I Think Bad Thoughts" | Danko Jones | Dr. Lee Dorian |
| 2012 | "The Ballad of Danko Jones" | Danko Jones | Dr. Lee Dorian |
| 2024 | "The Karate Kid" | Coldplay | Busker |

== Video games ==
| Year | Title | Role |
|---|---|---|
| 2020 | Cobra Kai: The Karate Kid Saga Continues | Daniel LaRusso |
| 2022 | Cobra Kai 2: Dojos Rising | Daniel LaRusso |

== Awards and nominations ==
| Year | Award | Category | Film/work | Result |
|---|---|---|---|---|
| 1982 | Young Artist Award | Best Young Actor in a Television Special | Eight Is Enough | Nominated |
| 1986 | Bravo Otto | Best Actor | Himself | Nominated |
| 2001 | Long Island International Film Expo | Long Island Independent Filmmaker Award | Himself | Won |
| 2002 | Long Island International Film Expo | Best director | Love Thy Brother | Won |
| 2002 | Stony Brook Film Festival | Audience choice | Love Thy Brother | Won |
| 2014 | Santa Barbara International Film Festival | Best Live Action Short Film | Across Grace Alley | Nominated |
| 2014 | American Short Film Awards | Best Drama short film | Across Grace Alley | Won |
| 2021 | Primetime Emmy | Outstanding Comedy Series | Cobra Kai (shared) | Nominated |
| 2022 | Critics Choice Super Awards | Best Actor in an Action Series | Cobra Kai | Nominated |
| 2022 | Kids' Choice Awards | Favorite male TV star | Cobra Kai | Nominated |
| 2022 | Suffolk Sports Hall of Fame | Special Recognition & Martial Arts | Himself | inducted |
| 2023 | Critics Choice Super Awards | Best Actor in an Action Series, Limited Series or Made-for-TV | Cobra Kai | Nominated |
| 2023 | Kid's Choice Awards | Favorite male TV star | Cobra Kai | Nominated |
| 2024 | Hollywood Walk of Fame | Star | Himself | Won |
| 2025 | Newport Beach TV Fest | Artist of distinction | Himself | Won |

== Book ==
- Macchio, Ralph (2022). Waxing On: The Karate Kid and Me. Dutton. ISBN 978-0593185834.
