= Robert R. Garwood =

American former prisoner of war (born 1946)

Robert Russell Garwood
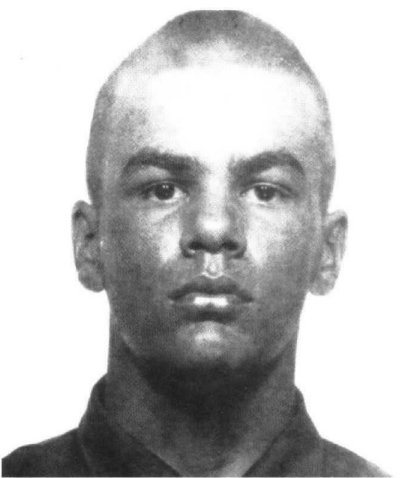
- U.S. Marine Corps photo of Garwood in 1963
- Born: April 1, 1946 (age 80); Greensburg, Indiana, U.S.
- Military career
- Allegiance: United States
- Branch: United States Marine Corps
- Service years: 1963–1981
- Rank: Private (demoted from Private first class)
- Nickname: Bobby
- Conflicts: Vietnam War

Robert Russell Garwood (born April 1, 1946) is a former United States Marine. Often cited as the last verified American prisoner of war (POW) from the Vietnam War, Garwood was captured on September 28, 1965, by Việt Cộng forces near Da Nang, Quang Nam Province. He was taken to North Vietnam in 1969, and although he was reportedly released in 1973 along with the other U.S. POWs as part of the Paris Peace Accords, he did not return to the United States until March 22, 1979.

Upon his return, the Department of Defense (DoD) judged him to have acted as a collaborator with the enemy, for which he was subject to a court-martial, stripped of his rank as Private first class and dishonorably discharged. In 1998, the DoD changed Garwood's status from RETURNEE to AWOL/Deserter/Collaborator.

Garwood has repeatedly denied all charges of collaboration. He also accuses the DoD of trying to rewrite history by framing him as a liar to discredit his 1984 claims about American POWs left behind in Vietnam, with activist and fellow Vietnam War veteran Ted Sampley commenting at Garwood's congress hearing that "before he even spoke, he was victim of character assassination".

== Early life and education ==
Garwood was born in Greensburg, Indiana, into a large, poor family of farmers to Ruth Buchanan and Jack Garwood. At age four, his parents divorced, after which Garwood lived with his father and paternal grandmother. Garwood attended high school in Indianapolis and dropped out at age 17 in order to join the U.S. Marine Corps. He began recruit training at Camp Pendleton in October 1963 and was deployed to South Vietnam in 1964. He was due to be reassigned on October 9, 1965.

== Military service and capture ==
Garwood was assigned to the U.S. Marine Corps base at Da Nang in South Vietnam as a motor pool driver. The circumstances surrounding his disappearance are in dispute. Garwood claims he was ambushed when he got lost when driving alone in a jeep to pick up an officer. He says his jeep was torched and he was stripped naked. Marine Corps records show on 28 September 1965, Garwood was absent at the 23:00 bed check. No unauthorized absence (UA) was reported, since he was thought to have had a "late run." He was reported UA when he failed to appear at formation the next morning.

On 29 September, the Division Provost Marshal was notified of Garwood's absence and an all points bulletin was issued for him and his vehicle. This was repeated for three days with no results. Motor pool personnel searched the areas of Da Nang that Garwood was known to frequent, but nothing was found. On 2 October, the division's Provost Marshal notified the South Vietnamese Military Security Services. Their search efforts also produced no information. Garwood's commanding officer reported to the Commandant, USMC, that in view of Garwood's past record of UA, he believed he had gone UA again and had possibly been taken POW. However, he recommended there be no change in Garwood's status and that he remain UA until evidence proved otherwise.

Two separate South Vietnamese agents eventually reported that the Việt Cộng (VC) claimed a U.S. serviceman and his jeep had been picked up in the Cam Hai region, about 11.5 miles (18.5 km) from the Da Nang Marine Corps base, when the serviceman had become lost. The American had been captured and the jeep burned. However, a ground and aerial search for the burned vehicle produced no results, nor did search operations on 1 October by four platoons. Two additional infantry platoons swept the area near Marble Mountain the next morning but also found nothing. On 12 October, the 704th ITC Det (CI) authorized a 100,000 VND reward for information leading to the recovery of the missing serviceman and additional 2,500 VND for the recovery of the vehicle.

On 3 December 1965, Company I, 3rd Battalion, 3rd Marines found a document titled Fellow Soldier's Appeal with Garwood's name on it, on a gate near Da Nang. The document recommended that U.S. troops stop fighting in South Vietnam and return home. The signature (B. Garwood) may well have been made by a rubber stamp and the English usage suggests it was not written by a native English speaker. A second version of this document was found on 18 July 1966 in the Da Nang area, but it appeared to be on better quality paper and the signature was at a different angle. Based on these, on 17 December 1965 Garwood's status was changed from "missing" to "presumed captured".

=== 1967–1972 ===
Garwood was held as a prisoner of war at Camp Khu northwest of Da Nang along with two United States Army prisoners. In May 1967, after repeated indoctrination sessions, Garwood was offered his release. He was given, and for the remainder of his time in South Vietnam carried, an undated "Order of Release." It was written in English, apparently so Garwood would recognize its importance, and it bore the seal and authorizing signature of the "Central Trung Bo National Liberation Front Committee," apparently so any Vietnamese would similarly appreciate its significance. Unlike those who had been offered release before him, Garwood declined and instead asked to join the VC. He adopted the Vietnamese name Nguyen Chien Dau and joined the VC. As a member of the Military Proselytizing Section of Military Region 5, he taped and wrote propaganda messages, made loudspeaker broadcasts near Marine Corps positions and assisted in guarding and indoctrinating U.S. prisoners in the MR-5 POW camp located in the village of Tra Khe, Trà Bồng District, Quảng Ngãi Province. Garwood lived with the camp guards outside the compound and, when not in the camp, was armed with a rifle or pistol. He dressed as the guards did and had freedom of movement both within and outside the camp. He frequently questioned U.S. prisoners and continually urged them to "cross over," as he had. In a surprisingly short period Garwood became fluent in Vietnamese and often acted as an interpreter for the North Vietnamese when they interrogated American prisoners. In early July 1968, Garwood was given officer status in the VC and promoted to a grade equivalent to a U.S. second lieutenant. On 15 July 1968, a Marine Corps reconnaissance team named Dublin City operating in the vicinity of Troui Mountain near Phu Bai engaged a VC unit. According to contemporaneous debriefing notes, now declassified, four members of Dublin City reported that one of the VC fighters was a Caucasian, who was shot during the action and yelled to his VC comrades "Help me!!" in English. The "white VC" was described as 20–25 years old, with brown hair, 5' 6" tall, "round eyes", and speaking very distinct English. Because they were outnumbered, Dublin City broke off contact with the VC but were followed. In a subsequent firefight a few minutes later, one of the Dublin City team member PFC Curtis “C.C.” Brown was killed.

In September 2011, 43 years later, U.S. President Barack Obama awarded one team-member of Dublin City, James Wilkins, a Silver Star for heroism on that day. Following receipt of the Silver Star, he recalled the white VC incident and stated "Myself and three other Marines looked at about 200 photos of guys who were missing in action. All of us were positive it was Bob Garwood, who apparently had defected and was helping the VC."

In 1969 Garwood had a conversation with captive Bernhard Diehl, a German nurse who, along with four other German nurses, had been captured by the North Vietnamese in April 1969. Diehl later related that he asked Garwood how he came to work for the VC and Garwood responded, "I don't think the Americans have suffered any great loss because I chose to fight on the other side. In any case, so many Americans are fighting with the South Vietnamese; why shouldn't there be a few fighting with the North?"

In September or October 1969, Captain Martin Brandtner commanded Company D, 1st Battalion, 5th Marines in an operation in the "Arizona Territory" southwest of Hội An. During a firefight he saw a Caucasian who appeared to be pointing out targets for the enemy. Even though the Marines fired at him the Caucasian did not appear to be hit. Brandtner was aware of reports that Garwood was suspected to be in that area and believed the man he saw with the enemy was indeed Garwood.

After 1969, Garwood was not seen in the POW camps. A Headquarters Marine Corps POW screening board suggested in 1972 that he had "gone to Moscow for training," and concluded that "PFC Garwood is still alive and probably still aiding the VC/NVA in SVN."

=== 1973–1979 ===
Garwood is listed as having either volunteered or been forced into a work group repairing a generator at Lien Trai I, one of the Yen Bai reeducation camps near Phan Xi Păng in the Hoàng Liên Sơn mountain range in northern North Vietnam. Other reports describe him as working at an unnamed "island fortress" in Thác Bà Lake, North Vietnam, or having been kept behind in mainland labor camps as a driver and vehicle mechanic.

In early 1979, in Hanoi, Garwood passed a note to a Finnish businessman associated with the United Nations: "I am American in Viet Nam. Are you interested? Robert Russell Garwood. 2069669 USMC." On 22 March, 13 years and 6 months after he was captured, Garwood flew from Hanoi to Bangkok and was met by a contingent of diplomatic, press and military officials, including the Marine Corps defense counsel assigned to represent him.

== Court-martial ==
Over a period of eleven months, Garwood faced a general court-martial at Camp Lejeune, North Carolina. He was found not guilty of desertion, solicitation of U.S. troops in the field to refuse to fight and to defect and of maltreatment. However, he was convicted on 5 February 1981, of communicating with the enemy and of the assault on a U.S. prisoner of war interned in a POW camp, in violation of Articles 104 and 128, Uniform Code of Military Justice. The court-martial sentenced Garwood to reduction to private, forfeiture of all pay and allowances and a dishonorable discharge. He was not sentenced to confinement. His conviction was upheld on appeal. United States v. Robert R. Garwood, 16 M.J. 863 (N.C.M.R. 1983), aff'd, 20 M.J. 148 (C.M.A. 1985). As a result, Garwood forfeited all back pay and veterans' benefits. Garwood later appealed his conviction to the United States Supreme Court, but the appeal was rejected. Garwood's record of trial covered 16 volumes and 3,833 pages of trial record and was to that time the longest court-martial case in Marine Corps history.

== Post-war POW claim investigation ==
During his court-martial, Garwood sought immunity for any offenses he might be charged with having committed between 1970 and 1980 in return for information he claimed to have regarding American POWs still in Vietnamese hands. Immunity was not granted and no information was offered by Garwood. Garwood says he saw other U.S. prisoners of war after 1973 during his own 13-year "captivity", though there are "wide inconsistencies" in his story.

In June 1992, a U.S. task force examined the sites where Garwood claimed to have seen live U.S. prisoners. They interviewed nearby residents and met with Vietnamese officials. However, the task force reported that "no evidence could be found to suggest that there are, or ever were, any live U.S. POWs" in those areas.

The Defense Intelligence Agency (DIA) investigated Garwood's claim that he saw live U.S. POWs in September 1977 at a "motel-shaped masonry building" in North Vietnam. The DIA reported it could not locate any masonry structures at the indicated location. Senator Bob Smith requested that the DIA search again. After a second search produced no results, Smith initiated a personal search with ABC News, Garwood, and Bill Hendon. The group traveled to Vietnam in 1993. Following Garwood's directions, they reported they had found a building exactly as Garwood had described it. The Vietnamese government and a former head of the DIA POW/MIA office disputed the finding, stating the structure had not existed when Garwood was a POW (satellite imagery from 1977 revealed "no buildings anywhere near the site"), and was "along the shoreline" rather than part of an island fortress, as Garwood had previously claimed. In a later deposition Garwood clarified that the masonry building looked like it was on an island, but it could have been a peninsula. Garwood said the boat ride took 20 minutes. Senator Smith, with Garwood, arrived at the masonry structure in 20 minutes, just as Garwood had described. Some independent investigators claim that Garwood represented an embarrassment to the U.S. government at the highest level for leaving live POW's behind and therefore did everything possible to discredit him. It was also claimed that he could hardly speak English when he returned and his lack of polish was used against him.

Since 1999, Robert R. Garwood has privately resided in Gautier, Mississippi. His first wife Kathy died shortly before their move. Garwood subsequently married the former Marilou M. Charest. His employment following his discharge, if any, is unknown.

== Media ==
=== Film ===
The made-for-TV film The Last P.O.W.? The Bobby Garwood Story, starring Ralph Macchio and Martin Sheen, was released in 1992. Garwood, played by Macchio, was a consultant on the film. The film's producers claimed that Garwood had received orders to survive from another higher ranking POW. However, there is no substantiation for this claim.

Garwood was also interviewed in 2006 by Sean Clifford for a Yale University senior thesis project. The project involved a documentary film component and Garwood participated in more than eight hours of videotaped interviews. The film included interviews with Garwood's court-martial attorney, Vaughan Taylor, and fellow former POW David Harker. The interviews with Garwood were the first in more than a decade and they represented his most complete account to date of the events surrounding his capture and eventual return to the United States.

=== Books ===
- Conversations With The Enemy: The Story of PFC Robert Garwood, published 1983, written by Winston Groom with Duncan Spencer. Groom, himself also a Vietnam veteran, later wrote the novel Forrest Gump and its follow-up novel, Gump & Co.
- Kiss the Boys Goodbye, published 1990, written by Monika Jensen-Stevenson, a producer for CBS's 60 Minutes in 1985. The book begins with a segment she produced on Garwood.
- Spite House, published 1997 and also written by Monika Jensen-Stevenson, gives a detailed account of an attempt by one of Lt. Colonel McKenny's commando teams to kill Garwood in a North Vietnamese jungle camp for allegedly collaborating with the enemy. It then tells of McKenney's conversion from a would-be assassin into someone who now believes in Garwood's innocence.
- Why Didn't You Get Me Out? published 1997, written by Frank Anton with Tommy Denton, gives a detailed account of Anton's five years as a POW. He offers extensive eye-witness accounts of Garwood and his collaboration with the NVA, claiming he even saw Garwood using a rifle to guard U.S. POWs. However Garwood maintained the rifle was not loaded and was taken from him as soon as there were no U.S. POWs around.

== See also ==
- Bowe Bergdahl
