= Hayward =

Hayward may refer to:

== People ==
- Hayward (surname), including a list of people with the name
- Hayward (given name), including a list of people with the name

== Places ==
- Hayward, California, U.S., in Alameda County
  - Hayward station (Amtrak)
  - Hayward station (BART)
  - Hayward Executive Airport
  - Hayward Fault Zone, a geologic fault zone
- Hayward, Mariposa County, California, U.S.
- Hayward, Minnesota, U.S.
- Hayward Township, Freeborn County, Minnesota, U.S.
- Hayward, Missouri
- Hayward, Oklahoma
- Hayward, Oregon
- Hayward, Wisconsin
- Hayward (town), Wisconsin
- Hayward station (British Columbia), Canada

== Other uses ==
- Hayward (profession), officer of an English parish in charge of fences and enclosures
- Hayward Gallery, an art gallery in London, England
- Actinidia deliciosa 'Hayward', a common cultivar of Kiwifruit
- Hayward Industries, a company involved in pool and outdoor living technology (etc.).
- Hotel Hayward, a building in Los Angeles

== See also ==
- Hayward High School (disambiguation)
- Hayward station (disambiguation)
- Haywards, a suburb near Wellington, New Zealand
- Haywards (pickles)
- Heyward, a given name and surname
- Haywood (disambiguation)
- Lake Hayward (disambiguation)
- Haywards Heath, a town in West Sussex, England
