= Haywood =

Haywood may refer to:

== Places ==
=== Canada ===
- Haywood, Manitoba

=== United Kingdom ===
- Haywood, Herefordshire
- Great Haywood, Staffordshire
- Little Haywood, Staffordshire

=== United States ===
- Hayward, California, formerly Haywood
- Haywood, Kentucky
- Haywood, North Carolina
- Haywood, Oklahoma
- Haywood, West Virginia
- Haywood City, Missouri
- Haywood County, North Carolina
- Haywood County, Tennessee

== Other uses ==
- Haywood (surname), including a list of people with the name
- Haywood (band), American indie rock band

== See also ==
- Hayward (disambiguation)
- Haywoode, English singer
- Heywood (disambiguation)
- Haywood Mall, in Greenville, South Carolina, U.S.
