= Hayward (surname) =

Hayward is a surname. Notable people with the surname include:

- A. E. Hayward (1884–1939), American cartoonist
- Abraham Hayward (1801–1884), English writer and essayist
- Adam Hayward (born 1984), American football player
- Alvinza Hayward (1822–1904), gold mining millionaire
- Ashton Hayward mayor of Pensacola, president of the Andrews Research and Education Foundation
- Basil Hayward (1928–1989) English footballer and manager
- Bill Hayward (1868–1947), American track and field coach
- Bob Hayward (1927–1961), Canadian powerboat racer
- Brian Hayward, Canadian ice hockey player
- Bronwyn Hayward, New Zealand political scientist
- Brooke Hayward, American actress and author
- Bruce W. Hayward (born 1950), New Zealand geologist, marine ecologist, and author
- Byron Hayward, Welsh rugby player
- Carolyn Hayward, Canadian bullfighter and artist
- Chard Hayward, Welsh actor
- Charles Hayward (politician) (1839–1919), mayor of Victoria, British Columbia (1839–1919)
- Charles Hayward (musician), English musician
- Charles William Hayward (1892–1983), British entrepreneur and philanthropist
- Charlie Hayward, American bass guitarist
- Charlotte Hayward (Charlotte Oelschlagel, 1898–1984), professional German skater
- Chris Hayward (1925–2006), American television writer and producer
- Chuck Hayward (1920–1998), American actor and stuntman
- Daniel Hayward (1808–1852), English cricketer
- Don Hayward (1925–1999), Welsh rugby player
- Sir Edward Waterfield Hayward a.k.a. Sir Bill Hayward (1903–1983), South Australian store owner, businessman, and art collector
- Eric Hayward, English footballer
- Evan Hayward (1876–1968), English Liberal M.P. for South East Durham (1910–1918)
- Ferd Hayward (1911–1988), Canadian long-distance walker
- Florence Hayward (1858–1939), South Australian poet, pen name "Firenze"
- Florence Hayward (writer), St. Louis author
- Francesca Hayward, Kenyan-born English ballet dancer and actress
- George Hayward (rugby union), Welsh rugby player
- George S. L. Hayward (1894–1924), British World War I aviator and Military Cross recipient
- George W. Hayward (1840–1870), British explorer
- George Simpson-Hayward, English cricketer
- Gordon Hayward (born 1990), American basketball player
- Gordon Hayward (cricketer), (1926–2014), English cricketer
- Harry T. Hayward (1865–1895), American gambler and suspected serial killer
- Hilda Hayward (1898–1970), New Zealand pioneer filmmaker
- Ida Margaret Hayward (1872–1949), British botanist
- Sir Isaac Hayward, leader of London County Council (1947–1965)
- Sir Jack Hayward, English property developer
- Jack Hayward (academic), English writer and academic
- James Hayward (artist), English military historian
- James Hayward (artist), born 1943
- Jimmy Hayward, American animation director
- Jocquim Hayward Stocqueler (1801–1886), British journalist
- Joel Hayward, New Zealand-born academic and poet
- Sir John Hayward (historian) (c. 1560 – 1627), English historian
- John Davy Hayward (1906–1965), English editor, critic and anthropologist
- John Hayward (artist) (1929-2007), English stained glass artist
- John Warburton (producer) (John Hayward-Warburton), British television producer
- Julia Sampson Hayward, American tennis player
- Justin Hayward, English singer/songwriter, The Moody Blues
- Katy Hayward, Northern Irish academic
- Ken Hayward, Australian politician
- Lance Hayward (1916–1991), Bermudan jazz pianist
- Lawrence Hayward, English musician
- Lazar Hayward (born 1986), American basketball player
- Leland Hayward, Hollywood and Broadway agent and theatrical producer
- Lillie Hayward (1891–1971), American silent film actress
- Louis Hayward, British actor
- Marcia Hayward, American politician
- Maurice Hayward (Governor of Bombay) (1923)
- Mary Hayward Weir (1915–1968), American steel heiress
- Mary E. Smith Hayward (1842–1938), American businesswoman
- Max Hayward (1924–1975), British lecturer and Russian translator
- Monroe Hayward (1840–1899), American senator
- Nantie Hayward, South African cricketer
- Nathaniel Hayward (1808–1865), inventor
- Nelson Hayward (1810–1857), 6th mayor of Cleveland, Ohio
- Paul Hayward, Australian rugby player
- Rachel Hayward, Canadian actress
- Ray Hayward, American baseball player
- Reggie Hayward, American football player
- Reginald Frederick Johnson Hayward (1891–1978), South African Victoria Cross recipient
- Richard Arthur Hayward, tribal chairman of the Mashantucket Pequot tribe (1975–1998)
- Richie Hayward (1946–2010), American drummer, Little Feat
- Rick Hayward, chairman of English professional football club Wolverhampton Wanderers
- Robert Hayward (disambiguation), several people
- Roger Hayward (1899–1979), American artist and architect
- Rowland Hayward (c. 1520 – 1593), English merchant and Lord Mayor of London
- Rudall Hayward (1900–1974), New Zealand film pioneer
- Ruxton Hayward, British eccentric
- Sidney Hayward (1897–1961), British barrister
- Steve Hayward, English footballer
- Steven Hayward, Canadian novelist
- Steven F. Hayward, American writer
- Susan Hayward, American actress
- Thomas Hayward (cricketer) (1835–1876), English cricketer
- Thomas Hayward (Royal Navy officer) (1767–1798), Royal Navy Officer
- Thomas Hayward (tenor), American tenor
- Thomas B. Hayward, U.S. Chief of Naval Operations
- Tim Hayward (born 1963), English food writer and restaurateur
- Tim Hayward (political scientist), British academic
- Tom Hayward (1871–1939), English cricketer
- Tony Hayward, Former Chief Executive of BP Group
- Vera Hayward (1902–1999), New Zealand teacher
- Victor Hayward (1888–1916), English explorer
- Victoria Hayward (b. 1992), Canadian softball player
- Victoria Hayward (1876–1956), Bermudan-born travel writer and journalist
- Wally Hayward (1908–2006), South African endurance athlete
- Walter Hayward-Young (1868–1920), British artist
- William Hayward (disambiguation), several people
- William Hayward, English sailor and captain
- William Hayward Pickering (1910–2004), New Zealand rocket scientist

== See also ==
- Heyward
