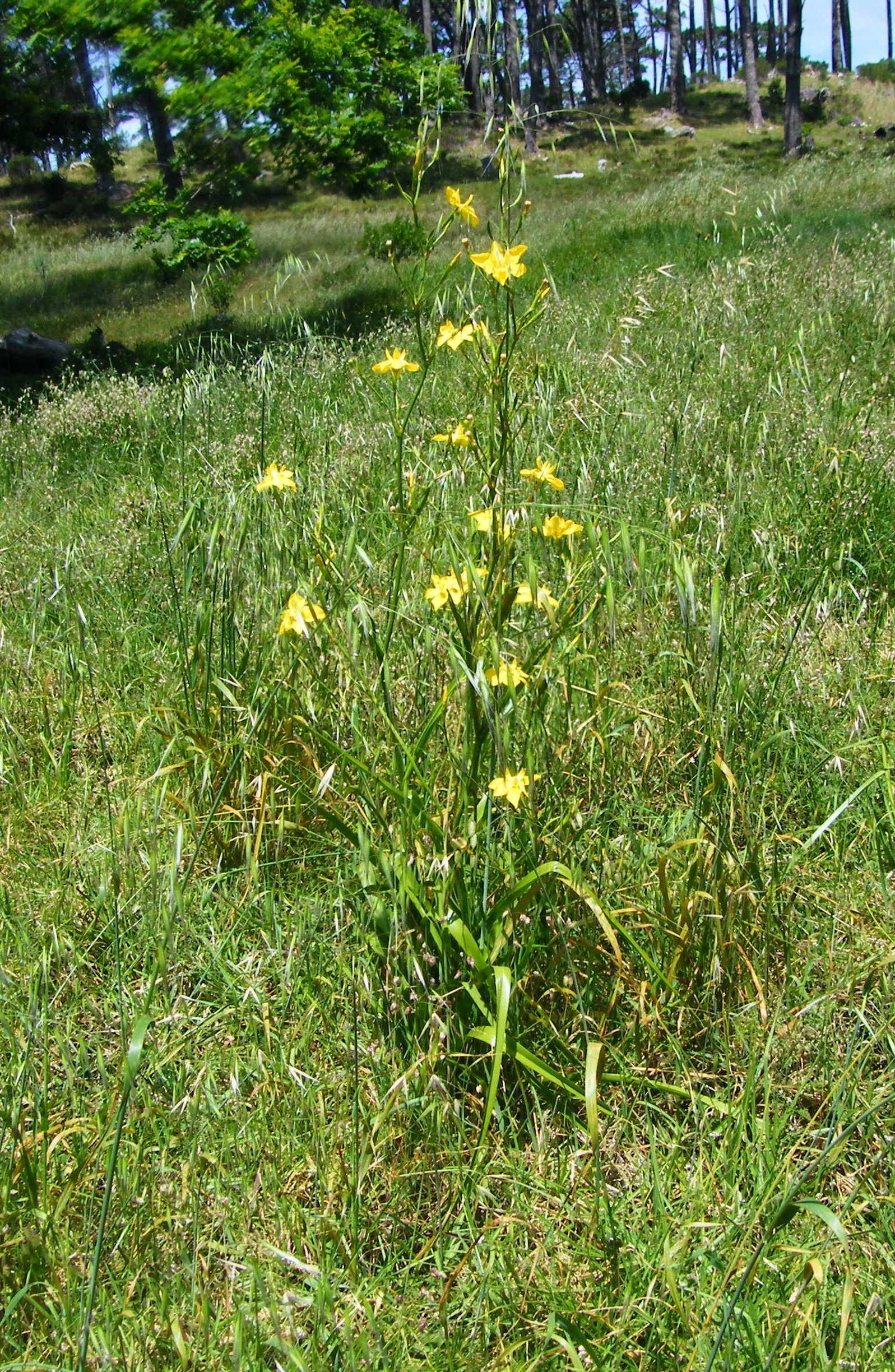

Scientific classification
- Kingdom: Plantae
- Clade: Tracheophytes
- Clade: Angiosperms
- Clade: Monocots
- Order: Asparagales
- Family: Iridaceae
- Genus: Moraea
- Species: M. ramosissima

Binomial name
- Moraea ramosissima (L.f.) Druce

Synonyms
- Freuchenia bulbifera Eckl.; Gladiolus ramosus Murray; Iris ramosa Thunb.; Iris ramosissima L.f.; Moraea bulbifera Jacq.; Moraea racemosa Drège ex Baker; Moraea ramosa Ker Gawl.; Vieusseuxia freuchenia Steud.; Vieusseuxia ramosa Eckl.

= Moraea ramosissima =

Species of flowering plant

Moraea ramosissima, commonly known as the vleiuintjie, vlei clockflower, or giant iris, is a plant and geophyte belonging to the genus Moraea; it is part of the fynbos and Succulent Karoo biomes. The species is endemic to the Eastern Cape and Western Cape, occurring from the Gifberge through to the Eastern Cape. The plant reaches a height of 50–120 cm and blooms from October to December; the flowers are yellow.
