= Heyward =

Heyward is a surname and given name.

== Surname ==
Notable people with the surname include:

- Andrew Heyward, American television executive
- Andy Heyward (born 1949), American television producer
- Cameron Heyward (born 1989), American football player
- Connor Heyward (born 1999), American football player
- Craig Heyward (1966–2006), American football player
- Darrius Heyward-Bey (born 1987), American football player
- Dick Heyward (1914–2005), deputy executive director of UNICEF
- Dorothy Heyward (1890–1961), American playwright
- DuBose Heyward (1885–1940), American author
- Duncan Clinch Heyward (1864–1943), American politician from South Carolina
- Elisabeth Heyward (1919–2007), Nuremberg Trials interpreter
- Jason Heyward (born 1989), American baseball player
- Jonathon Heyward, American conductor
- Louis M. Heyward (1920–2002), American film and television screenwriter
- Nick Heyward (born 1961), British musician
- Shaka Heyward (born 2000), American football player
- Susan Heyward (born 1982), American actress
- Thomas Heyward Jr. (1746–1809), American politician from South Carolina

== Given name ==
Notable people with the given name include:

- Heyward Donigan, American business executive
- Heyward Dotson (1948–2020), American basketball player, attorney, and civil servant
- Heyward Hutson (born 1936), American politician and military officer
- Heyward Shepherd (1825–1859), a black man killed during John Brown's raid on Harpers Ferry
- Heyward Isham (1926–2009), American diplomat and editor

== See also ==
- Hayward (surname)
