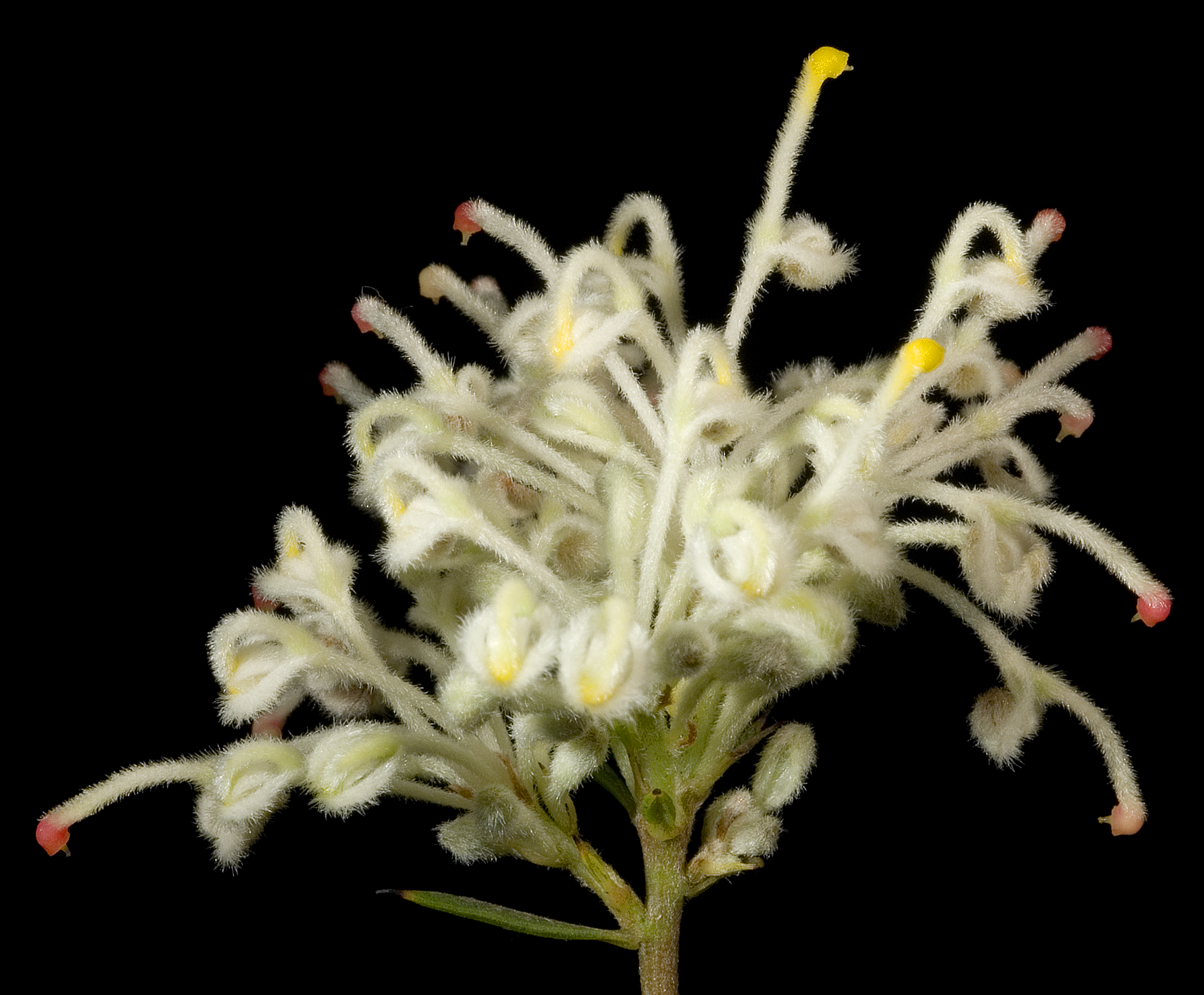

Scientific classification
- Kingdom: Plantae
- Clade: Tracheophytes
- Clade: Angiosperms
- Clade: Eudicots
- Order: Proteales
- Family: Proteaceae
- Genus: Grevillea
- Species: G. pilulifera

Binomial name
- Grevillea pilulifera (Lindl.) Druce

Synonyms
- List: Grevillea lycopodina S.Moore; Grevillea oxystigma Meisn.; Grevillea oxystigma var. acerosa Meisn.; Grevillea oxystigma var. heterophylla Meisn.; Grevillea oxystigma Meisn. var. oxystigma; Grevillea oxystigma var. tenella Meisn.; Hakea pilulifera Lindl.

= Grevillea pilulifera =

Wooly-flowered grevillea

Species of shrub endemic to Western Australia

Grevillea pilulifera, commonly known as woolly-flowered grevillea, is a species of flowering plant in the family Proteaceae and is endemic to the south-west of Western Australia. It is an erect or spreading shrub with linear to narrowly oblong leaves and hairy, white to cream-coloured flowers, the style with a bright yellow, later red tip.

== Description ==
Grevillea pilulifera is an erect or spreading shrub that typically grows to a height of 0.3 to 1 metre (1.0 to 3.3 ft) and has many branches. Its leaves are linear to narrowly oblong, 3–60 mm (0.12–2.36 in) long and 0.5–11 mm (0.020–0.433 in) wide, the edges turned down or rolled under, the upper surface grainy and the lower surface softly-hairy when exposed. The flowers are arranged in small groups and are covered with white to cream-coloured hairs, the pistil 6.5–8.5 mm (0.26–0.33 in) long. The end of the style is glabrous, bright yellow at first, turning orange, then red as the flower ages. Flowering occurs from April to December and the fruit is a softly-hairy, oblong follicle 8–13 mm (0.31–0.51 in) long.

== Taxonomy ==
This species was first formally described in 1840 by John Lindley, who gave it the name Hakea pilulifera in A Sketch of the Vegetation of the Swan River Colony. In 1917, George Claridge Druce changed the name to Grevillea pilulifera in The Botanical Exchange Club and Society of the British Isles Report for 1916. The specific epithet (pilulifera) means "bearing a little ball", referring to the tight clusters of buds.

== Distribution and habitat ==
Woolly-flowered grevillea is found among medium to low sized trees in scrubland or heathland on gravelly soil. It is widespread between Badgingarra, Busselton and Albany and is commonly found on the Darling Range.

== See also ==
- List of Grevillea species
