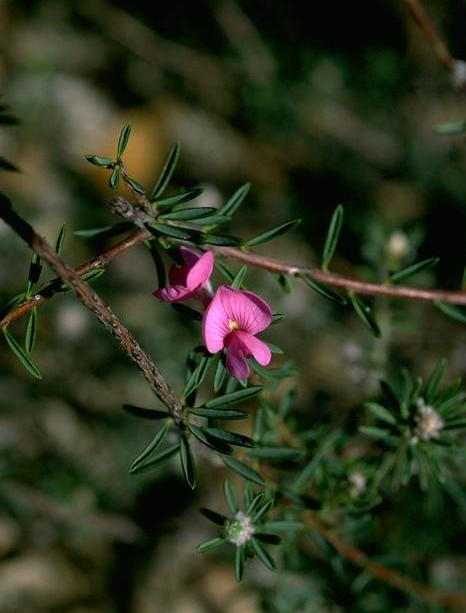
- Pultenaea subalpina in the Mount Annan Botanic Garden

Scientific classification
- Kingdom: Plantae
- Clade: Tracheophytes
- Clade: Angiosperms
- Clade: Eudicots
- Clade: Rosids
- Order: Fabales
- Family: Fabaceae
- Subfamily: Faboideae
- Genus: Pultenaea
- Species: P. subalpina

Binomial name
- Pultenaea subalpina (F.Muell.) Druce

Synonyms
- Burtonia subalpina F.Muell. nom. inval., nom. nud.; Burtonia subalpina F.Muell. isonym; Pultenaea rosea F.Muell. nom. illeg.

= Pultenaea subalpina =

Rosy bush-pea

Species of plant

Pultenaea subalpina, commonly known as rosy bush-pea, is a species of flowering plant in the family Fabaceae and is endemic to a restricted area of Victoria. It is a rigid, prostrate to erect or spreading shrub with linear leaves and pink, pea-like flowers.

== Description ==
Pultenaea subalpina is a rigid, prostrate to erect or spreading shrub that typically grows to a height of up to 1.5 m (4 ft 11 in) and has silky-hairy stems when very young. The leaves are arranged alternately along the branches, linear, 6–12 mm (0.24–0.47 in) long, 0.7–1.0 mm (0.028–0.039 in) wide with stipules 1.5–2.1 mm (0.059–0.083 in) long at the base. The flowers are pink and arranged in dense clusters of up to twelve with enlarged stipules at the base of the floral leaves. The sepals are 5–6 mm (0.20–0.24 in) long with linear bracteoles 3–4 mm (0.12–0.16 in) long attached to the base of the sepal tube. The standard petal 8.5–11.9 mm (0.33–0.47 in) long, the wings 8.5–11.3 mm (0.33–0.44 in) long, and the keel 7.6–8.0 mm (0.30–0.31 in) long. Flowering occurs from November to January and the fruit is a hairy, egg-shaped pod 5.2–6.3 mm (0.20–0.25 in) long.

== Taxonomy ==
Rosy bush-pea was first formally described in 1855 by Ferdinand von Mueller who gave it the name Burtonia subalpina his book Definitions of rare or hitherto undescribed Australian plants. In 1917, George Claridge Druce changed the name to Pultenaea subalpina.

== Distribution and habitat ==
Pultenaea subalpina grows in heathland and the shrub layer of open woodland communities at altitudes between 1,050 and 1,200 m (3,440 and 3,940 ft) in the Grampians of western Victoria.
