= Steven Hayward =

Steven Hayward, Stephen Hayward, or Steve Hayward could refer to:

- Steven F. Hayward (born 1958), American political commentator
- Steve Hayward (born 1971), English footballer
- Steven Hayward (Canadian writer), Canadian novelist
- Stephen Hayward (1954–2015), British publisher, founder of the Serif publishing house
