= Heywood =

Heywood may refer to:

== People ==
- Heywood (given name), including a list of people with the name
- Heywood (surname), including a list of people and fictional characters with the name

== Places ==
=== Antarctica ===
- Heywood Island (Antarctica), South Shetland Islands
- Heywood Lake, in Three Lakes Valley, South Orkney Islands

=== Australia ===
- Heywood, Victoria
  - Shire of Heywood, former local government area
- Heywood Island (Western Australia)

=== United Kingdom ===
- Heywood, Greater Manchester
  - Municipal Borough of Heywood, Lancashire, former local government district
  - Heywood (UK Parliament constituency)
  - Heywood and Middleton (UK Parliament constituency)
- Heywood, Norfolk
- Heywood, Wiltshire

== Other uses ==
- Heywood's Bank, a private banking firm 1788–1874
- Heywood Chair Factory, Philadelphia, U.S.
- Heywood-Wakefield Company, formerly Heywood Brothers, an American furniture manufacturer
- Heywood Preparatory School, in Corsham, England
- Heywood-class attack transport, a class of U.S. Navy ships
  - USS Heywood (APA-6)
- Bo Donaldson and The Heywoods, an American pop music group

== See also ==
- Haywood (disambiguation)
- Heywoodia, a genus of plants
- Heywood Hill Literary Prize
- Heywood Manuscript, a collection of handwritten copies of letters and poems of the Heywood family
- Levi Heywood Memorial Library Building, in Gardner, Massachusetts, U.S.
- R v Heywood, a case in the Canadian Supreme Court
