= Callawassie Sugar Works =

- U.S. National Register of Historic Places
- Location within South Carolina Location within the United States
- Nearest city: Okatie, South Carolina
- Coordinates: 32°20′08″N 80°51′26″W
- Area: less than one acre
- Built: 1740
- NRHP reference No.: 13001096
- Added to NRHP: May 27, 2014

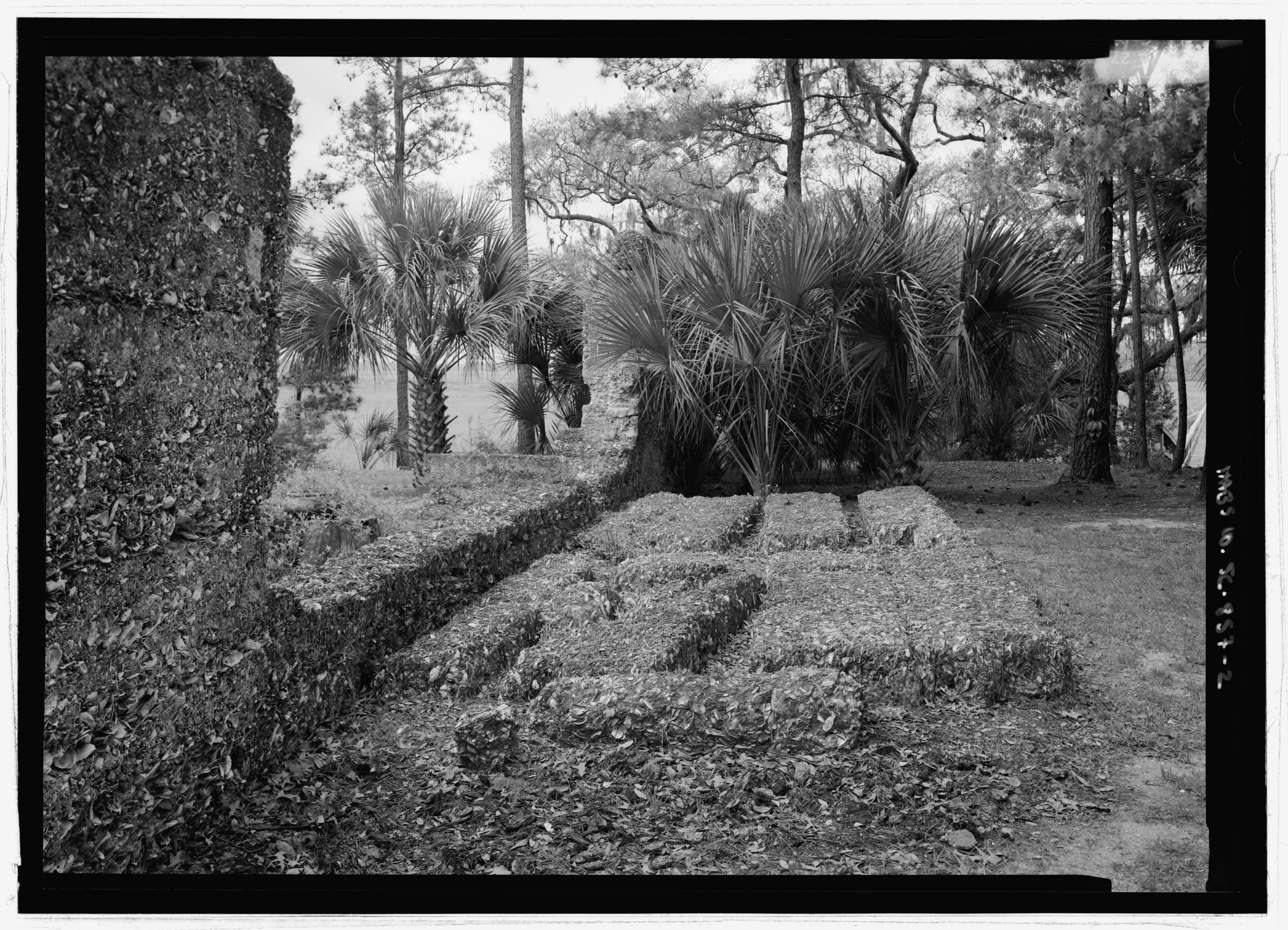
Callawassie Sugar Works

The Callawassie Sugar Works is a historically significant industrial site at 29 Sugar Mill Drive in Okatie, South Carolina, on Callawassie Island in Beaufort County. The site contains the tabby ruins of two structures (the sugar mill base or foundation, and the boiling house) and archeological evidence of a third structure (most likely the curing shed). The sugar works, constructed circa 1815–1818, was a complex for processing sugar cane into sugar.

Archeological and historical evidence suggests that the Callawassie Sugar Works was part of a larger settlement which included housing for slaves and possibly an overseer's house. The settlement was mostly constructed soon after 1816 while Callawassie Island was owned by James Hamilton, Jr. The architect/builder of the sugar works is unknown. It is conjectured that the sugar mill was built sometime within the next three years, and based on plans similar to mill construction seen in the West Indies.

Research supports that James Hamilton, Jr., (1786-1857) was most likely the developer of the Callawassie Sugar Works (circa 1816). He was the son of Major James Hamilton, an aide to General George Washington in the Revolutionary War, and grandnephew of Thomas Lynch, Jr., a signatory of the Declaration of Independence. He served during the War of 1812. Through marriage, James Hamilton, Jr., was nephew-in-law to South Carolina's largest and most prosperous rice planter, Nathaniel Heyward, and stepson-in-law to Savannah River investor Nicholas Cruger. These gentlemen shared close familial and professional relationships and entrepreneurial drive to develop and implement new industries such as sugar production. Hamilton had acquired several close and influential West Indian connections who were heavily involved in the Caribbean sugar trade. Hamilton sold the property and moved to Charleston, South Carolina in early 1819, leaving no documentation on the mill and its anticipated use. Apparently, the sugar works were still operational when it was abandoned as ashes were left uncleared from the furnace.

The Callawassie Sugar Works' construction appears to be based on observations made by Thomas Spalding. It incorporated three principal components: a mill, boiling house, and curing shed. The footprint of the buildings suggests that the boiling house and curing shed were aligned in a "T" configuration (little remains of the curing shed). The remaining structures include exterior walls of the one-story buildings with the brick boiling train still evident in the mill. Primitive mills of this kind usually had a set of four kettles arranged in a line, the tops of the kettles being raised from the floor.

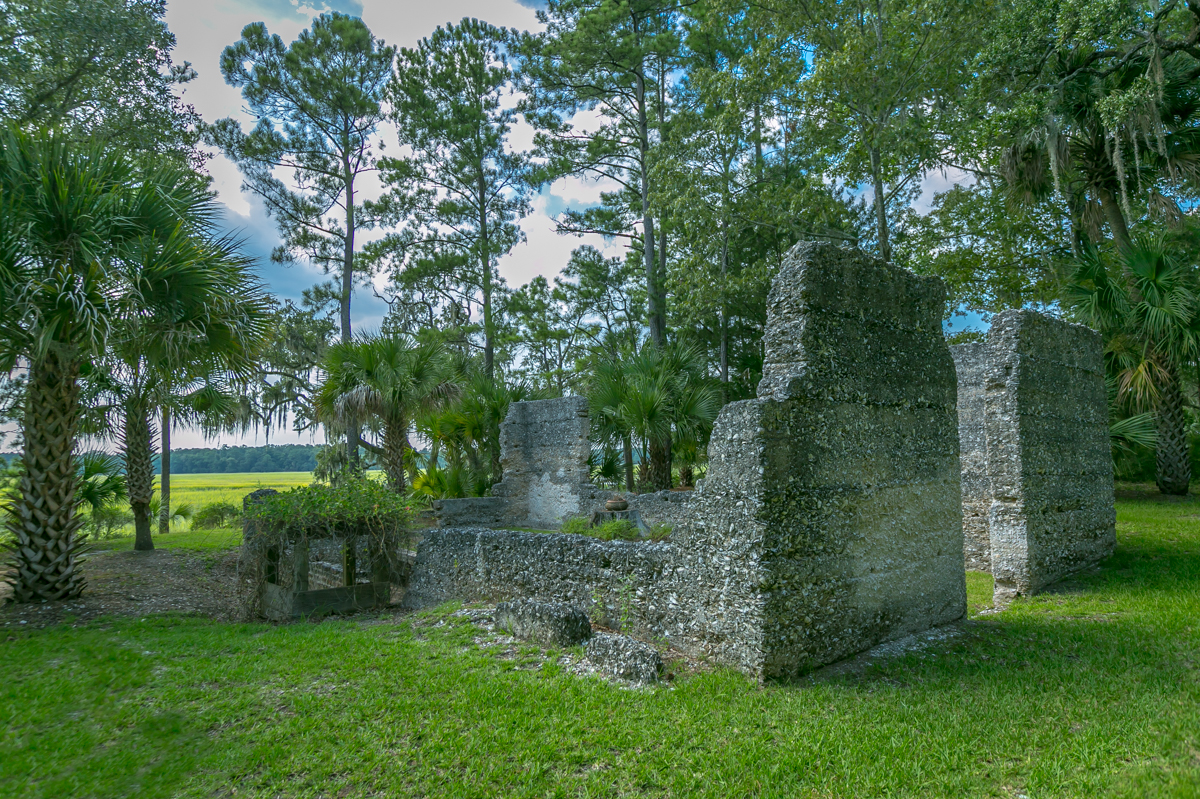
Callawassie Sugar Works

Today, only the foundation of the mill and parts of the boiling house remain of the three structures of the sugar mill: the mill itself, boiling house, and curing shed. There is no evidence (above or below ground) that the tabby cement mill base was ever enclosed within a permanent structure, even though the base survives in excellent condition. While the boiling pans and masonry that supported them have disappeared, the boiling train bed, constructed of fire brick, is still intact, together with an ash pit and wall vents. The long tabby wall on the north side of the boiling house collapsed outward and retained enough integrity to enable theoretical reconstruction of the original layout of windows. Excavation of glass at the site suggests that the windows were glazed. Only tabby strip foundations remain of the curing shed, which was most likely timber framed. All machinery and mechanical equipment is gone. Despite the degradation of the sugar mill site over time, the remnants are still illustrative of sugar processing before the introduction of steam machinery in the late 1830s.

The sugar mill ruins on Callawassie Island are featured as a "unique example of industrial tabby" and "the only one of its kind to exist in South Carolina." Tabby, referred to as "poor man's masonry," is a building substance created by mixing locally available materials (such as oyster shells) with equal parts, water, sand, and lime. The Spanish brought it to the New World before A.D. 1700. Shellfish remains available from aboriginal shell middens provided a plentiful source for tabby construction. Tabby wall construction involved up to six successive pours, each requiring a set of forms or molds. According to the National Park Service, the tabby remaining at the Callawassie Sugar Works "appears to have been well compacted and meticulously cast."

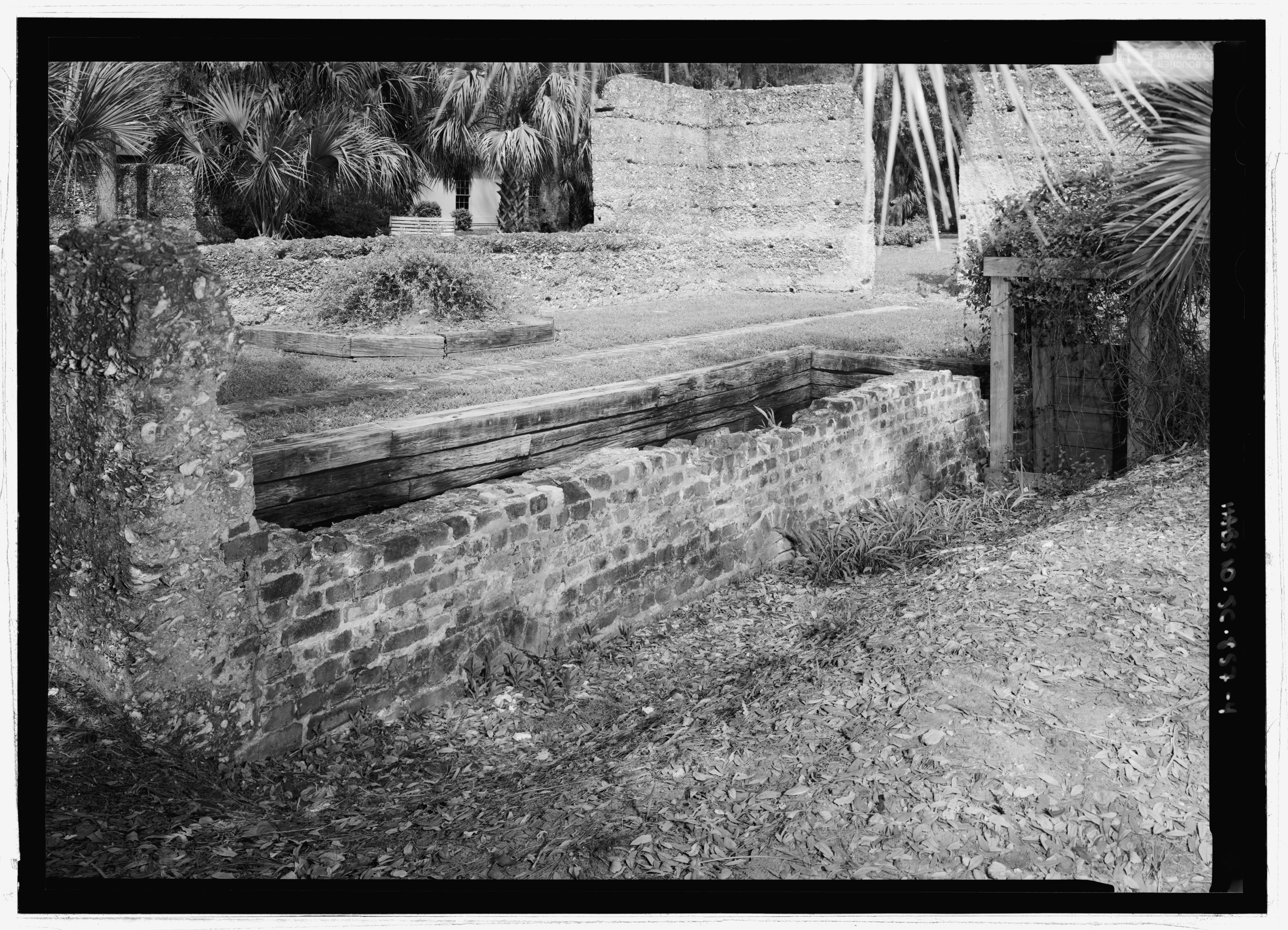
Callawassie Sugar Works

The Callawassie Sugar Works is one of the few remaining structures from this early period of sugar production along the Atlantic Coast. Sugar was one of the few agricultural commodities protected by a tariff, which levied three cents per pound duty on foreign raw sugar in 1816. This inspired wealthy planter entrepreneurs of the Georgia and South Carolina coastal areas to explore the viability of a local sugar industry. Despite Hamilton's entrepreneurial hopes and Spalding's professional expertise, the growing conditions in the Low country of South Carolina were not ideally suited for the successful cultivation of sugar cane, which prefers a year-round temperature of 75 degrees Fahrenheit with at least 60 inches of rainfall. The sugar works on Callawassie Island is the only example of such an early enterprise in the South Carolina Low country.

The Callawassie Sugar Works was listed on the National Register of Historic Places on May 27, 2014.

== See also ==
Callawassie Island
