= Sean McManus (television executive) =

American television executive

Sean Joseph McManus (born February 16, 1955) is the former chairman of CBS Sports and was the president of both CBS Sports and CBS News from 2005 to 2011.

== Education and early career ==
McManus graduated from Fairfield College Preparatory School, a private Jesuit high school in Fairfield, Connecticut, and Duke University.

In 1977, McManus began working as a production assistant and associate producer at ABC Sports. In 1979, he moved to NBC Sports and in 1982, aged 27, he became its vice-president of program development. Here he first became involved in rights negotiations, for sports such as the Olympic Games, football, tennis, basketball, horse racing and auto racing.

In 1987, he became a senior vice president of American TV sales and programming for Trans World International, the television division of sports marketing firm International Management Group.

== Career at CBS ==
McManus was named president of CBS Sports in November 1996. Here, he continued to be active in negotiating broadcast rights deals for major American sports, such as the National Football League, the NCAA, the PGA Tour and Southeastern Conference (SEC) football/ basketball. He also oversaw a logo redesign for CBS Sports and rebranded CSTV's cable and digital businesses as CBS College Sports Network in 2008 and as CBS Sports Network in 2011. He co-launched the digital network CBS Sports HQ in 2018 and supervised several Super Bowl broadcasts, including Super Bowl XLVII, Super Bowl LIII, and Super Bowl 50.

McManus was named president of CBS News in October 2005 and continued to serve concurrently as president of sports. As president of news, he oversaw building of a modern newsroom and control room in New York and created the series CBS Reports: Children of the Recession.

He was executive producer of Inside the NFL on Showtime.

In September 2023, McManus announced that he would be stepping down from his position as Chairman of CBS Sports the following April with CBS Sports President David Berson succeeding him.

== Awards ==
McManus has won 22 Emmy Awards and the Cynopsis Sports Media Legacy Award. He was inducted into the Broadcasting & Cable Hall of Fame in 2010 and the Sports Broadcasting Hall of Fame in 2016.

== Personal life and family ==
McManus is the son of sportscaster Jim McKay (Jim McKay's legal surname was McManus). He lives in Connecticut with his wife and children.

Business positions
Preceded by Andrew Heyward; David Kenin	CBS News President; CBS Sports President; 2005–2011; 1996–2013	Succeeded by Jeff Fager; David Berson
