= Hayward (given name) =

Hayward is a given name. Notable people with the name include:

- Hayward Alker (1937–2007), American international relations academic
- Hayward Clay, American football player
- Hayward Davenport (1874–1959), British maritime painter
- Hayward Davis (1928–2014), American politician
- Hayward A. Harvey (1824–1893), American inventor and industrialist
- Hayward Ellis King (1928–1990), American visual artist and curator
- Hayward Mack (1879–1921), American silent film actor
- Hayward Morse, British actor
- Hayward Sanford (1916–2000), American football player
- Hayward Williams, American singer-songwriter

== See also ==
- Hayward (disambiguation)
