= Eric Ober =

American broadcasting executive

- Born: Brooklyn, United States
- Education: Yale University; Columbia University
- Occupations: President of CBS News; President of Food Network; Chairman of Vault.com

Eric Ober is an American broadcasting executive who served as president of CBS News from 1990 to 1996 and of Food Network from 1997 to 2000. Prior to serving as president of CBS news he was the news director at affiliate WBBM-TV in Chicago.

A native of Brooklyn, Eric Ober is a graduate of Yale University (B.A.) and Columbia University (M.A.).

His successor at CBS News was Andrew Heyward.

During the 2000s, Eric Ober has run a television production company in New York City while also serving as chairman of the board for Vault.com.

In the 1999 film The Insider, Eric Kluster, a character based on Ober, is portrayed by Stephen Tobolowsky.
