= Charlotte Georgina Trower =

British botanist and botanical artist (1855–1928)

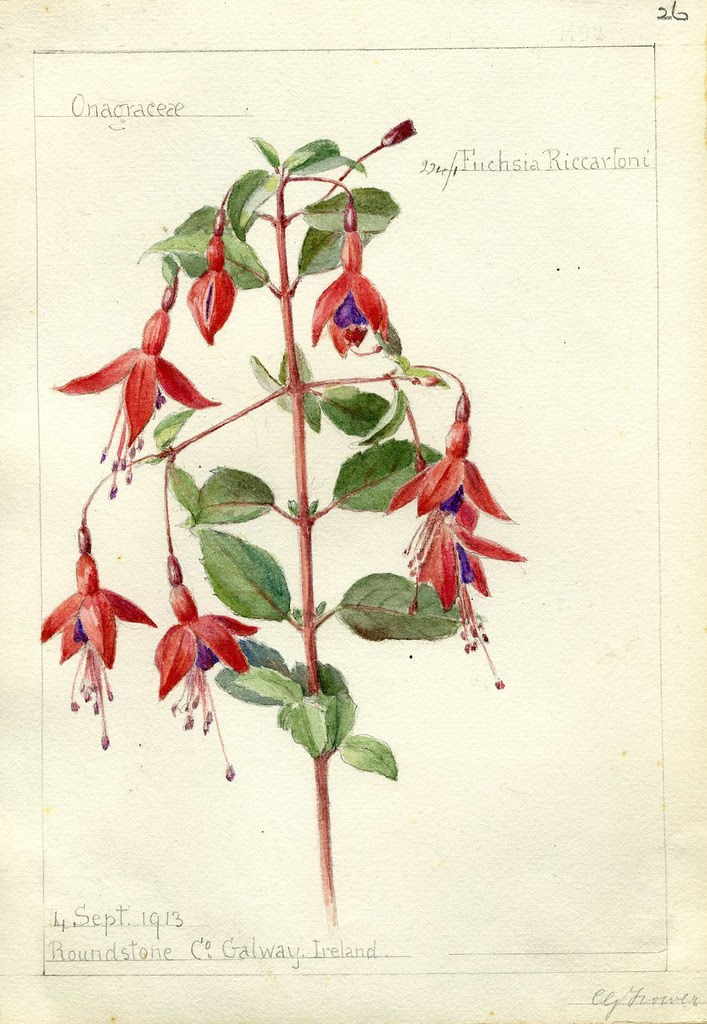
Fuschsia riccartoni, 1913 by Charlotte Georgina Trower

Charlotte Georgina Trower (1855, Ware, Hertfordshire – 8 November 1928, Ware, Hertfordshire) was a British botanical illustrator and botanist noted for her watercolor paintings of mostly British plants and flowers. She collaborated with her sister Alice and amateur botanist George Claridge Druce to create over 1,800 scientifically accurate paintings. Her illustrations were used as major contributions in two books, Skene's Flower Book for the Pocket and British Brambles.

== Life ==
Charlotte Georgina Trower was born in 1855 at the family estate at Stanstead Bury, in Ware, Hertfordshire. She was the daughter of Edward Spencer Trower and his wife Emma nee Gosselin, and had two brothers and a sister. The family were wealthy, and after their elder brother died in 1914 the two sisters, neither of whom married, took over the estate. Trower was a British botanical illustrator and botanist noted for her watercolor paintings of mostly British plants and flowers. She collaborated with her older sister Alice and amateur botanist George Claridge Druce to create over 1,800 scientifically accurate paintings, many from specimens sent to her through the post. She developed a number of techniques for reviving specimens which arrived in a poor state. Her illustrations were used as major contributions in two books, Skene's Flower Book for the Pocket and British Brambles.

Trower died on 8 November 1928 at Stanstead Bury.

The collection of Trower's paintings was acquired by Druce in its entirety in 1928, and he then bequeathed it to the University of Oxford in 1932, who have made the images available online.

== Works ==
- "Trower Botanical Illustrations Collection". herbaria.plants.ox.ac.uk. Oxford University Herbaria. Archived from the original on 4 April 2019.
- Skene, Macgregor; Trower, Charlotte Georgiana; Weston, Ruth (1937). A flower book for the pocket. Oxford University Press : Humphrey Milford. OCLC 939667712.
- Watson, W; Trower, Charlotte Georgiana; Druce, G. Claridge (1929). British brambles. T. Buncle & Co. OCLC 21308172.
