= Hayward High School =

Hayward High School may refer to:

- Hayward High School (California)
- Hayward High School (Wisconsin)

== See also ==
- Sir Jack Hayward High School, in Freeport, Bahamas; see Jack Hayward
- Hayward (disambiguation)
