= Gordon Hayward (cricketer) =

English cricketer (1926–2014)

Personal information
- Full name: James Gordon Rotherham Hayward
- Born: 31 December 1926; Speeton, East Riding of Yorkshire, England
- Died: 29 September 2014 (aged 87)
- Batting: Left-handed
- Bowling: Right-arm fast-medium

Domestic team information
- Years: Team
- 1951: Nottinghamshire

Career statistics
Competition	First-class
Matches	1
Runs scored	–
Batting average	–
100s/50s	–
Top score	–
Balls bowled	216
Wickets	2
Bowling average	39.00
5 wickets in innings	0
10 wickets in match	0
Best bowling	2/78
Catches/stumpings	0/–
- Source: Cricinfo, 3 March 2013

James Gordon Rotherham Hayward (31 December 1926 – 29 September 2014) was an English cricketer. Hayward was a left-handed batsman who bowled right-arm fast-medium. He was born at Speeton, East Riding of Yorkshire.

Hayward made a single first-class appearance for Nottinghamshire against Oxford University 1951 at the University Parks. Hayward wasn't called upon to bat during the match, but did take two wickets in Oxford University's first-innings, dismissing John Marshall and Richard Wollocombe to finish with figures of 2/78 from 36 overs. His only first-class appearance ended in a draw.

Hayward died on 29 September 2014, at the age of 87.
