= Ida Margaret Hayward =

British botanist and botanical collector

- Born: 1872; Trowbridge, United Kingdon
- Died: 1949 (aged 76–77); Galashiels
- Occupation: Botanist
- Scientific career
- Author abbrev. (botany): Hayw.

Ida Margaret Hayward FLS (1872–1949) was a British botanist and botanical collector.

Hayward was born 1872 in Trowbridge, Wiltshire, where she lived until her father died and she moved to Galashiels, Scotland with her mother.

When her uncle William Sanderson noticed that seeds transported in with the wool he imported from Australia, New Zealand and South America often survived the process at his wool mill and started to grow on the stored finished tweed, Hayward started to study the plants. The plants also grew along the River Tweed. Along with George Claridge Druce she identified the plants and together in 1919 they jointly published the results in "The Adventive Flora of Tweedside". She then travelled the country giving presentations including to several societies such as the Botanical Society of Edinburgh, the Linnean Society of London and the Royal Scottish Geographical Society.

She was a member of the Botanical Society of Britain and Ireland from 1908, the Linnean Society made her a fellow in 1910, and the Botanical Society of Edinburgh made her a fellow in 1913.

She died on 2 October 1949 in Galashiels.

The Royal Botanic Garden Edinburgh archives hold a small collection containing her scrapbook and correspondence.
