= Lake Hayward =

Lake Hayward may refer to:

- Lake Hayward (Connecticut)
- Lake Hayward (Wisconsin)
- Hayward Lake in British Columbia
