= Haywood (band) =

Haywood was an indie rock quartet from Philadelphia, Pennsylvania and Brooklyn, New York that was active from 1992 to 2000. They have been compared to Superchunk and Modest Mouse. While the band achieved only modest success in their eight years together, their third album We Are Amateurs, You and I was well reviewed, receiving an 8.2 rating on Pitchfork and praise from John Darnielle of The Mountain Goats. The release is regarded as the album which could have kick-started Haywood's rise to fame, had they not coincided the release with the announcement that the band had split up.

== Band history ==
Members

The original four band members included Ted Pauly, Rob Viola, Jeff Paretchan, and Ariel Serbin. They played together as Haywood from 1992 until about 1999. Danny Barria replaced Serbin for the remaining two years of the band's career.

Pauly (vocals, guitar), Viola (drums), Paretchan (bass, keyboards, backup vocals) and Serbin (guitar, backup vocals) first played together in a high school cover band called Garden Party in suburban Philadelphia, Pennsylvania (which also featured Lars Ro, later of Lampshade; and now in Sfu·ma·to). Despite airplay on college radio stations such as Lehigh University's WLVR, band members did not gain notoriety and moved to New York.

On Haywood's final album, original member Ariel Serbin is not credited as being a member of Haywood, since he departed from the band before their demise. He was replaced by Danny Barria and relegated to the list of thanks.

Post-Haywood

After Haywood split up, Rob Viola and Jeff Paretchan went on to form The Red and the Black along with Tim Lauben and Michael Esper. They released their debut album Plans For Next Year in 2002.

In 2004, Haywood reunited to work on a set of new material that Pauly had written over the last few years. Their intention was to arrange and record a new album in the studio only. The album, As Long As There Is Track, I Will Not Go Back, was completed in early 2006, but was not released until March 2007.

Viola and Paretchan also briefly played with Nashville-based singer-songwriter Carter Little.

Danny Barria is now one-third of the Brooklyn-based trio The Big Sleep.

== Discography ==
=== Albums ===
- Model For a Monument (1998)
- Men Called Him Mister (1999)
- We Are Amateurs, You and I (2001)
- As Long As There Is Track, I Will Not Go Back (2007)

=== Compilations ===
- L'Affection Affection – Featuring The Breakdancing Song (Purderous Magina Records, 1993)
- Parade of Homes – featuring Devon Lanes (Two Peters Records, 1994)
- Haywood / Mariner 9 Split 7" – featuring Trophy Case (Crank! Records, 1996)
- Fuel Films Tour Compilation – featuring Newbie Zimbo (Arena Rock Records, 1998)
- Self Portrait 2 – featuring Alpenland (Permafrost Records, 1999)
- Music for Robots Vol. 1 – featuring Mermaid (Music For Robots, 2005)

=== Other releases ===
- Trash Park (7" single, 1993)
- Great Cats Give Chase (4 song cassette, 1996)
- Fin De Siècle (4 song cassette, Purderous Magina Records, 2000)
