= Hayward station =

Hayward station may refer to:

- Hayward station (British Columbia), a railway station in North Cowichan, Canada
- Hayward station (BART), a rapid transit station in Hayward, California, United States
- Hayward station (Amtrak), an intercity rail station in Hayward, California, United States
