= Dick Heyward =

UN official (1914–2005)

Dick Heyward (September 22, 1914 – August 3, 2005) was a deputy executive director of UNICEF between 1949 and 1981. During that time, he was responsible for developing many of UNICEF's policies for children and served under three executive directors.

== Life and career ==
E.J.R. Dick Heyward was born in Tasmania in 1914. He grew up on his family's apple farm and studied at the London School of Economics. He served as first secretary to the Australian Mission between 1947 and 1949. He started his career in UNICEF as the Deputy Executive Director in charge of Operations in 1949 and soon developed a reputation for his intellect, efficiency and dedication.

He played a leading role in integrating UNICEF into the United Nations Development Programme established in the late 1950s. In 1960, UNICEF established a special survey into the needs of children commissioning reports from the World Health Organization (WHO), the Food and Agriculture Organization (FAO) and other UN organisations. The outcome of this work was the Children of the Developing Countries report arguing that children be the focus of development programs and that UNICEF supported "Planning for Children". As a result of the new policy guided by Heyward, UNICEF funded educational programs for the first time.

Heyward became a Deputy Executive Director of UNICEF in 1975 with the rank of UN Assistant Secretary General. In that year, he played a significant role in reviewing assistance to the third world. He championed the "basic services" model where services would be integrated and community based rather than the top down model previously in place. UNICEF committed to this model in 1976 and the organisation was working with the WHO in adopting a preventative approach to health care. After some initial reluctance, UNICEF agreed to support a proposal by child related NGOs such as the International Union for Child Welfare to set up the International Year of the Child in 1979.

He retired from his position in UNICEF in 1981. However, he continued to travel regularly to Africa on missions from UNICEF, the World Bank and the WHO. For example, in the early 1990s he recommended to the World Bank that iodine be added to water from village wells to address deficiencies in that mineral rather than fortifying salt as salt was not always used. However, he had a stroke in 1997 which meant that he was not able to travel as widely as before. Heyward died in Manhassett on Long Island after a long illness in 2005.

Heyward's wife Elisabeth Heyward was a United Nations conference interpreter, and his son Andrew Heyward was president of CBS News until 2005. His other son Peter Heyward was a lawyer in Washington DC.
