= Hayward, Oregon =

Unincorporated community in the state of Oregon, United States

Coordinates: 45.6442786°N 123.2167789°W

A barn in the community

Hayward is an unincorporated community in Washington County, Oregon, United States. Settled in the late 1880s and named in 1891 by Binger Hermann, it is located off U.S. 26 near Manning. It had a public school from 1891-1945. The school was a 20'x30' frame building that cost $184.44 to build, which included $60 for the carpenter, William Clapshaw. In 1946 it was sold at auction, dismantled, and moved to Banks.

It has a cemetery, opened in 1894. It had a post office from December 1891 until November 1904. Previously, the neighboring town of Greenville, Oregon had the only nearby post office, and it reverted there after it closed.

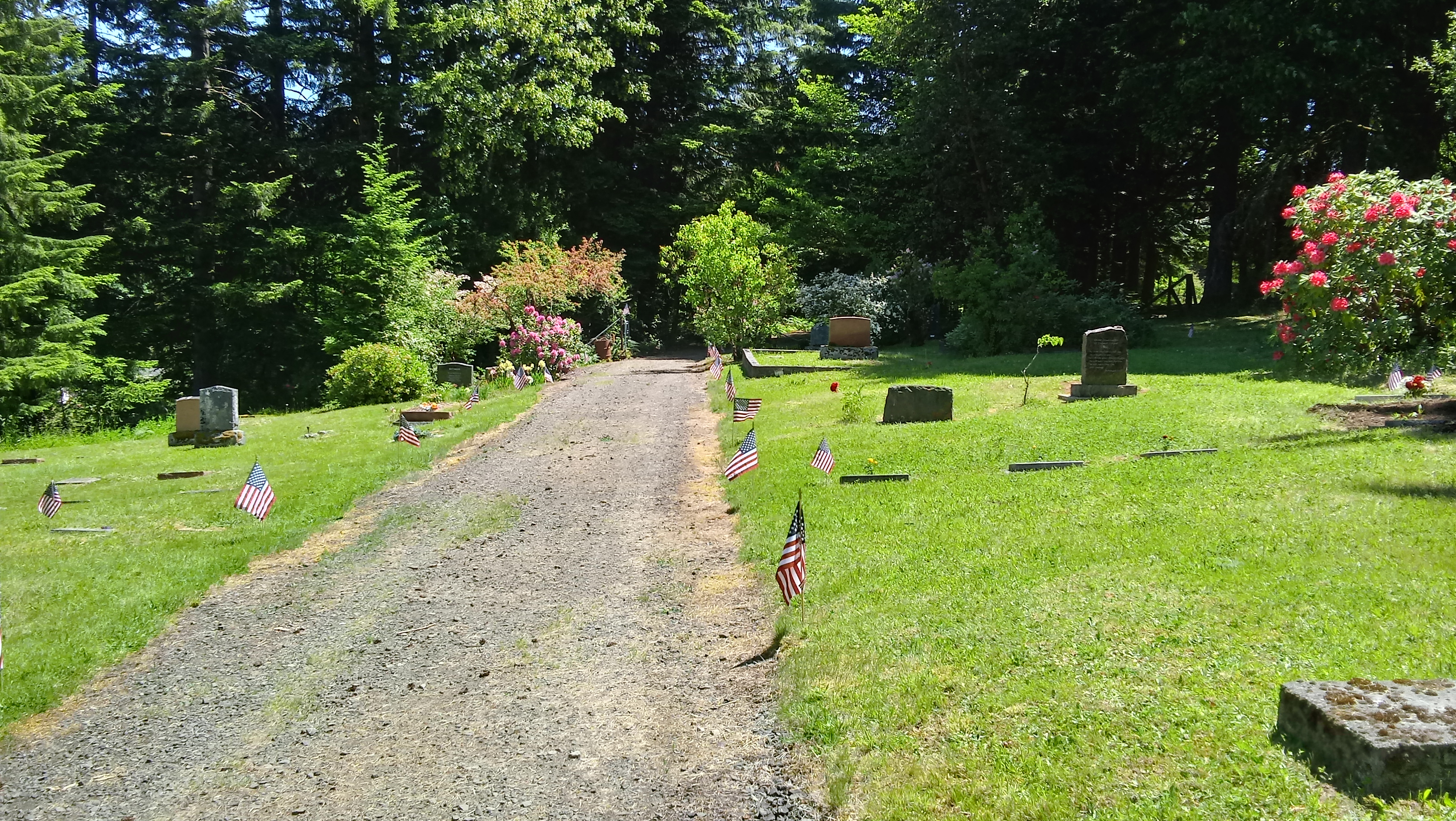
The Hayward Cemetery on Memorial Day 2021
