= Elisabeth Heyward =

- Born: October 8, 1919; Russia (France)
- Died: July 29, 2007 (aged 87); New York
- Occupation: Interpreter (United Nations)

Elisabeth Heyward was one of the participating interpreters during the Nuremberg Trials (1945–1949) held in the city of Nuremberg, Germany, after World War II. She was the wife of Dick Heyward, former senior deputy executive director of UNICEF. Her son is former CBS News president Andrew Heyward.

== Biography ==
=== Exodus from Russia ===
Elisabeth Heyward was born on October 8, 1919, in St. Petersburg, Russia. About a year after her birth Heyward's family left St. Petersburg. In 1920, she was among a mass of Russian migrants diverging into Berlin. Four years later, Heyward's family left Germany to settle in Paris, France. A few years after World War I – at the age of five – Heyward had the overwhelming task of attending a school in Paris without, at first, having any knowledge of French. At home, Heyward spoke Russian with her parents although they were fluent in German as an outcome of having resided in Berlin for four years.

=== In France ===
With the most of Elisabeth's upbringing being in France, Heyward's education was almost exclusively French, and she later attended an institution that offered advanced studies in trade and commerce. Although they had stated that the milieu of her education had been male-dominated, Heyward finished her schooling with excellent accomplishment and had become fluent in English, winning first prize, in fact, during an English-language competition. At that time, however, the French government failed to recognize this notable linguistic accomplishment as Heyward had not yet earned French citizenship.

After World War II, Heyward was able to demonstrate her incredible talent as a polyglot while working at the France Presse news agency. Heyward's experience at France Presse eventually led to her interpreting career, first during the Nuremberg Trials and then for the United Nations in New York.

=== Book excerpts ===
Elisabeth Heyward was literally thrown in the deep end. The day she arrived in Nuremberg she went into the visitors' gallery, where she was astonished to see and hear simultaneous interpreting. The next day in the courtroom she had to launch into simultaneous interpreting herself. She survived this "baptism by fire" most successfully...A fair number of those who worked as interpreters in Nuremberg became and remained professional interpreters. – from "The Origins of Simultaneous Interpretation: The Nuremberg Trial" by Francesca Gaiba, 1988

=== In New York City ===
At the United Nations headquarters in New York, Heyward joined the French Section of the Interpretation Service, working from English and Russian. She later occupied the post of Head of the French Section until her retirement in 1981. After officially leaving the U.N. as a permanent staff member, Heyward continued working as a freelance interpreter until April 17, 2004. She died July 29, 2007, in New York.

== See also ==
- List of UN Interpreters
