= Andrew Heyward =

American former president of CBS News (born 1950)

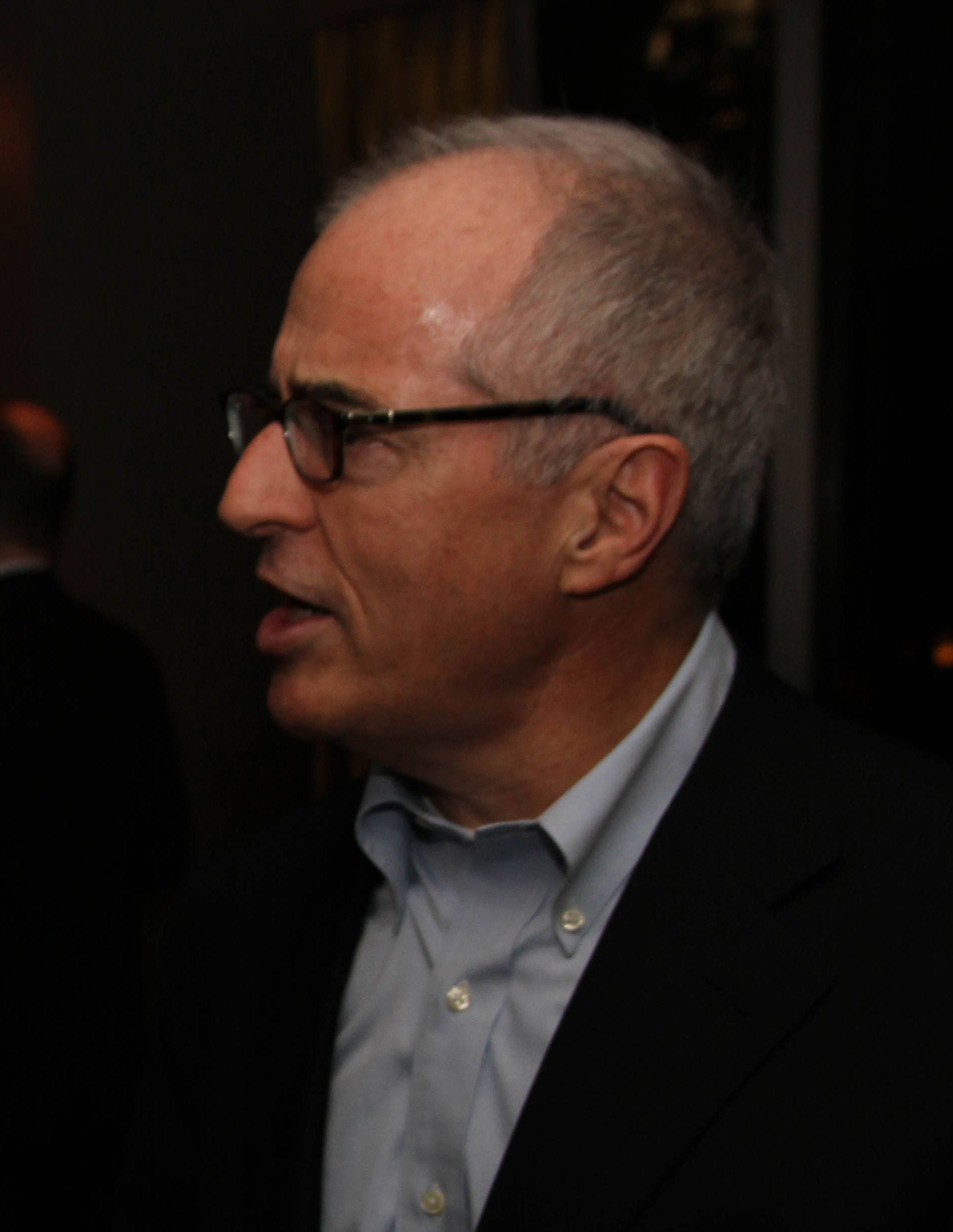
Andrew Heyward in February 2012

Andrew Heyward (born October 29, 1950) is a former President of CBS News, serving from January 1996 until early November 2005. He is a principal at MarketspaceNext and Heyward Advisory LLC.

He is the son of UNICEF deputy-executive director Dick Heyward and Russian-born interpreter Elisabeth Heyward. He has three children: David and Emily, both of whom work in New York City, and Sarah, a writer for HBO's Girls. He is married to Priscilla Painton, executive editor at Simon & Schuster. His first marriage to Jody Gaylin ended in divorce.

Heyward's successor at CBS News was Sean McManus, head of CBS Sports.

Heyward is played by Bruce Greenwood in the 2015 movie Truth.

He graduated from Harvard College 1972 with a B.A. in history and literature and was elected to Phi Beta Kappa.

Business positions
Preceded by Eric Ober	CBS News President; 1996–2005	Succeeded by Sean McManus
