= Richard Wollocombe =

English cricketer

Personal information
- Full name: Richard Henry Wollocombe
- Born: 12 January 1926; Pachmarhi, Central India, British India
- Died: 7 June 2002 (aged 76); Bath, Somerset, England
- Batting: Right-handed
- Bowling: Leg break

Domestic team information
- Years: Team
- 1950: Berkshire
- 1951–1952: Oxford University

Career statistics
Competition	First-class
Matches	9
Runs scored	314
Batting average	22.42
100s/50s	1/–
Top score	119
Balls bowled	863
Wickets	10
Bowling average	62.30
5 wickets in innings	–
10 wickets in match	–
Best bowling	2/33
Catches/stumpings	1/–
- Source: Cricinfo, 13 February 2019

Richard Henry Wollocombe (12 January 1926 – 7 June 2002) was an English first-class cricketer.

Born at Pachmarhi in British India, Wollocombe was educated in England at Wellington College, Berkshire. He captained the Wellington College cricket team in 1943, He served during the closing stages of World War II as a second lieutenant in the Royal Artillery. Following the war, Wollocombe briefly worked in advertising, before going up to Worcester College, Oxford.

Having played minor counties cricket for Berkshire in 1950, he debuted in first-class cricket for Oxford University against Lancashire at Oxford in 1951. He played three further matches in 1951, followed by four more in 1952. Playing as a leg spinning all-rounder, Wollocombe 276 runs in eight matches for Oxford, coming at an average of 21.23. He scored 119 runs in a little over two hours against Worcestershire in 1952. With his leg breaks, he took 9 wickets at the expensive bowling average of 52.55. Despite his century in 1952, Wollocombe found himself replaced in the team by Bill Mitchell, who was considered a superior bowler. In addition to playing first-class cricket for Oxford University, Wollocombe also represented the Free Foresters in a first-class match against Oxford University in 1951.

After graduating from Oxford, he returned to the advertising profession. He died at Bath in June 2002.
