= Heywood (given name) =

Heywood is a masculine given name. Notable people with the name include:

- Heywood "Woody" Allen (born 1935), United States comedian, movie director, and jazz clarinetist
- Heywood Banks, United States comedian
- Heywood Broun (1888–1939), United States journalist
- Heywood Hale Broun (1918–2001), United States journalist
- Heywood L. Edwards (1905–1941), United States naval officer
- Heywood Gould (born 1942), United States screenwriter
- Heywood Sumner (1853–1940), an English painter and antiquary

== Fictional characters ==
- Heywood R. Floyd, character in works by Arthur C. Clarke
- Heywood Jablome, pseudonym used by pranksters
