= Boilery =

Place where boiling takes place

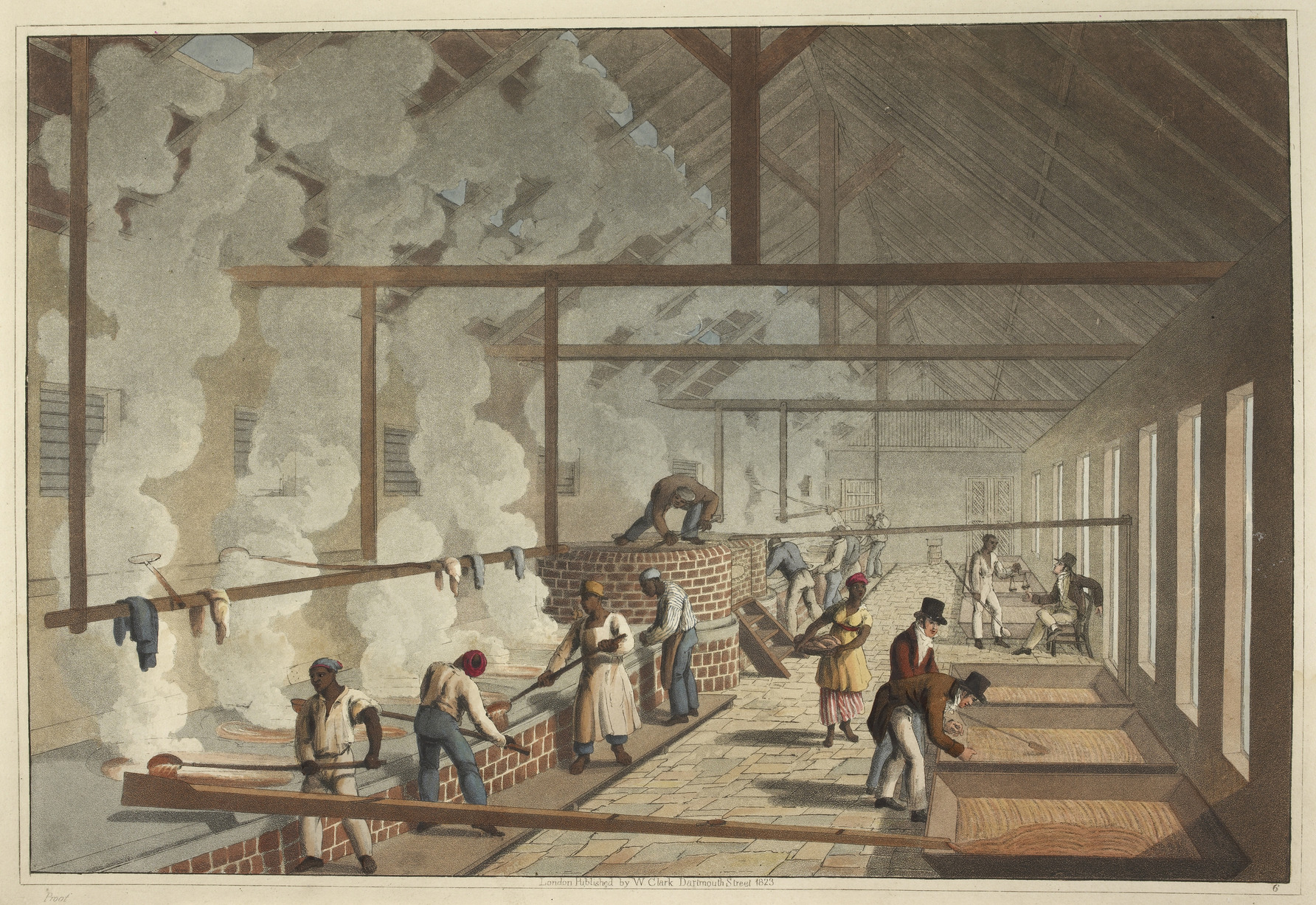
A boiling house in a slave plantation in Antigua, 1823

A boilery or boiling house is a place of boiling, much as a bakery is a place of baking. Boilery can also mean the process and equipment for boiling. Although they are now generally confined to factories, and usually boil industrial products rather than food, historically they were more common in daily life. Boileries are typically used for boiling large quantities of fluid.

In the 17th to 19th centuries, boileries were used to convert sugarcane juice into raw sugar. These boileries were usually sturdy places, built from stone, and contained several copper kettles, each with a furnace beneath it., Sugarcane juice was treated with lime in large clarifying vats, before it was heated in copper kettles over individual furnaces. Due to their importance, many Western sugar plantations had their own boileries on site.

Soap would also be made in a boiling house.

Another use for a boilery is to make salt through the evaporation of brine water.
