= Haywood, West Virginia =

- Unincorporated community
- Location within West Virginia Location within the United States
- Coordinates: 39°22′52″N 80°20′09″W
- Country: United States
- State: West Virginia
- County: Harrison
- Elevation: 1,020 ft (310 m)
- Time zone: UTC-5 (Eastern (EST))
  - Summer (DST): UTC-4 (EDT)
- ZIP code: 26366
- Area codes: 304 & 681
- GNIS feature ID: 1554668

Haywood is an unincorporated community in Harrison County, West Virginia, United States. Haywood is located on West Virginia Route 20, 0.5 miles (0.80 km) northeast of Lumberport. Haywood has a post office with ZIP code 26366.

== Climate ==
The climate in this area is characterized by hot, humid summers and generally mild to cool winters. According to the Köppen Climate Classification system, Haywood has a humid subtropical climate, abbreviated "Cfa" on climate maps.
