= Steven Hayward (writer) =

Canadian novelist and short story writer

Steven Hayward talks about one's Don't Be Afraid novel on Bookbits radio.

Steven Hayward is a Canadian novelist and short story writer.

Born in Toronto, Hayward attended the University of Toronto and York University. His first book, Buddha Stevens and Other Stories, won the 2001 Upper Canada Writer's Craft Award; prior to that, the individual stories that would eventually make up this collection were nominated for the Pushcart and Journey prizes, won awards at the University of Greensboro, the University of Arkansas, and the University of Toronto, and had appeared in The Iowa Review, Writ, Exile, The Southwestern Review, Fiddlehead and Canadian Fiction Magazine.

Amazon.ca describes Buddha Stevens and Other Stories as an "intelligent, funny, and engaging volume of postmodern fictions deals with the essential elements of life: love, sex, age, and death." The review goes on to say, "Unlike many postmodernists, however, Hayward sticks to very traditional plots and never hides his characters beneath layers of coy obscurity, proving that it is possible to tell a memorable story through an unusual, playful structure."

Hayward holds a doctorate from York University in Shakespeare and Literary Theory. He taught from 2001 to 2008 at John Carroll University and currently is a professor of English at Colorado College and teaches on creative writing and fiction.

His first novel, The Secret Mitzvah of Lucio Burke was published in Canada in February 2005. The Italian translation won the Grinzane Cavour Prize for debut fiction in January 2006.

He has published nonfiction on film, literary theory, Renaissance drama, Canadian literature and The Sopranos.

He is a member of the Cleveland East Side Writers group.
