= George Claridge Druce =

English botanist (1850–1932)

George Claridge Druce JP FRS FLS
- Born: 23 May 1850; Potterspury, Northamptonshire
- Died: 29 February 1932 (aged 81); Oxford, Oxfordshire
- Resting place: Holywell Cemetery
- Occupations: Botanist, academic, public servant
- Writing career
- Language: English
- Notable works: Flora of Oxfordshire (1886), Flora of Berkshire (1887), Flora of Buckinghamshire (1926), Flora of West Ross (1929)
- Notable awards: Honorary MA, University of Oxford (1889)

George Claridge Druce JP FRS FLS (23 May 1850 – 29 February 1932) was an English botanist and a Mayor of Oxford.

== Personal life and education ==
G. Claridge Druce was born at Potterspury on Watling Street in Northamptonshire. He was the illegitimate son of Jane Druce, born 1815 in Buckinghamshire.

He went to school in the village of Yardley Gobion. At 16, he was apprenticed to P. Jeyes & Co., a pharmaceutical firm in Northampton. In 1872, he passed exams to become a pharmacist.

In 1909, Druce moved to 9 Crick Road. He named the house "Yardley Lodge", after the village in which he spent his youth. He died at his home aged 81 and was buried in Holywell Cemetery.

== Career as a pharmacist ==
In June 1879, Druce moved to Oxford and set up his own chemist's shop, Druce & Co., at 118 High Street, which continued until his death. He also featured as a shopkeeper in the Oxford novel Zuleika Dobson by Max Beerbohm. A plaque to Druce was erected on this shop by the Oxfordshire Blue Plaques Board in April 2018.

== Contributions to botany ==
Druce's main interest was botany. In 1876, he was involved in the foundation of the Northampton Natural History Society.

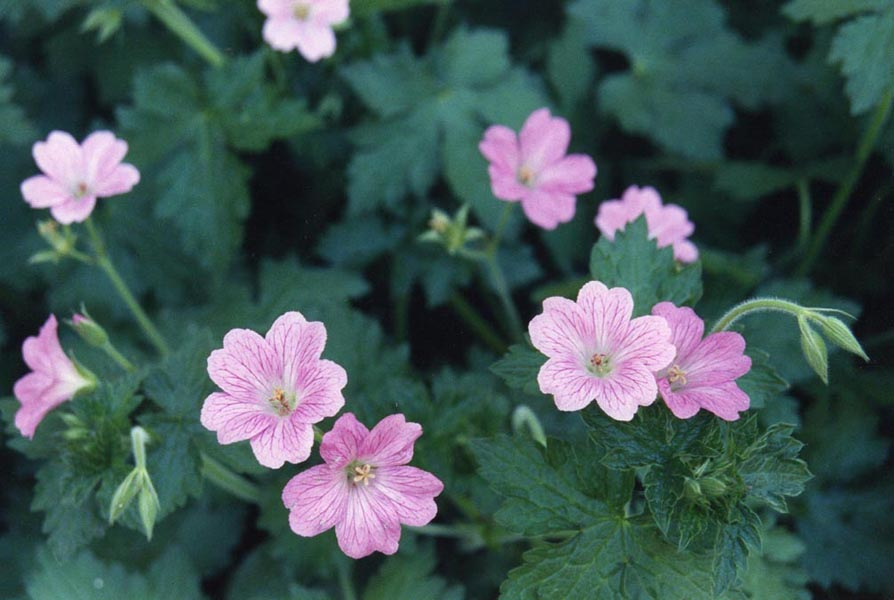
Geranium x oxonianum 'Claridge Druce'

In 1880, Druce helped to found the Ashmolean Natural History Society of Oxfordshire, originally established as the Ashmolean Society in 1828. It was merged with the Oxfordshire Natural History Society by Druce in 1901.

In 1886, he published The Flora of Oxfordshire, in 1887 The Flora of Berkshire, in 1926 The Flora of Buckinghamshire and in 1929 The Flora of West Ross. He was one of very few people to write a flora for more than one county.

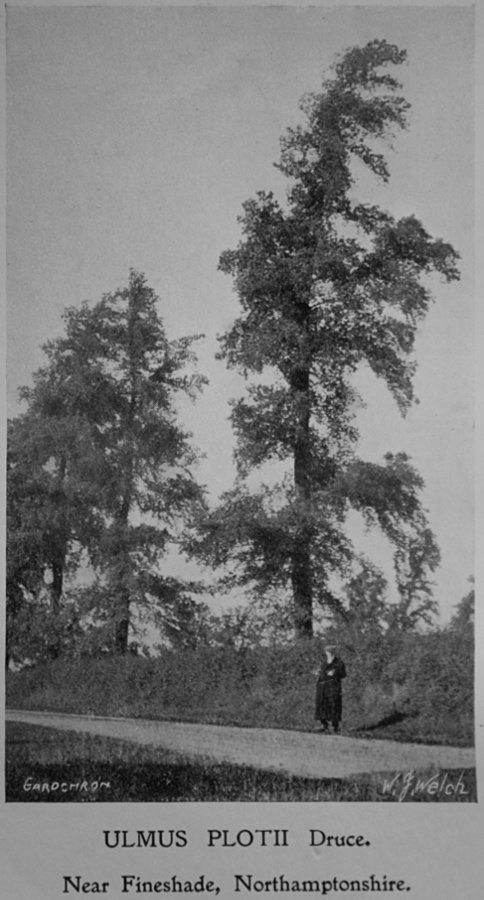
Druce standing before Plot's Elms, Fineshade

== Oxford City Council ==
Claridge Druce served on Oxford City Council from 1892 until his death, and was Chairman of the Public Health Committee. He served as Sheriff of Oxford during 1896–97. He presented the City of Oxford with the Sheriff's gold chain and badge, kept in the Town Hall, to commemorate the Diamond Jubilee of Queen Victoria in 1897. Druce served as Mayor of Oxford in 1900–01. A stone marking the city boundary at the top of Cuckoo Lane in the east Oxford suburb Headington was erected at the time and is engraved with his name. In 1920, Druce was made an Alderman and a portrait in his robes can be seen in the Council Chamber.

== Honours and legacy ==
In 1889, he was awarded the degree of honorary MA by the University of Oxford and in 1895 he was appointed Fielding Curator in the Department of Botany at the university. Among his discoveries, Druce was the first to recognise (1907–11) as a distinct variety of field elm a rare narrow-leaved form, unique to the English Midlands, that he had noticed at Banbury and Fineshade, Northamptonshire, which he named 'Plot's Elm' after the Oxford botanist Robert Plot.

He was a Fellow of the Royal Society and a Justice of the Peace.

His herbarium was combined with Henry Barron Fielding's herbarium (collected in the 1850s) to create the Fielding-Druce Herbarium of the University of Oxford.

== List of works ==
- — (1886). The Flora of Oxfordshire. Oxford and London: Parker and Company.
- — (1897). The flora of Berkshire. Oxford: Clarendon Press.
- —; Vines, Sydney Howard (1897). An Account of the Herbarium of the University of Oxford. Oxford: Clarendon Press.
- Prior, C.E.; — (1900). Account of Otmoor (PDF). Banbury: W. Potts.
- — (1907). The Dillenian herbaria. Oxford: Clarendon Press.
- — (1908). List of British plants : containing the spermopytes, pteridophytes and charads found either as natives or growing in a wild state in Britain, Ireland, and the Channel Isles. Oxford: Clarendon Press.
- Hayward, W. R.; — (1909). Hayward's botanists' pocket-book (13th ed.). London: G. Bell & sons.
- Vines, Sydney Howard; — (1914). An account of the Morisonian Herbarium in the possession of the University of Oxford together with biographical and critical sketches of Morison and the two Bobarts and their works and the early history of the Physic Garden 1619-1720. Oxford: Clarendon Press.
- Hayward, Ida Margaret; — (1919). The adventive flora of Tweedside. Arbroath: Buncle.
- — (1922). Flora Zetlandica. Arbroath: Buncle.
- — (1922). The mosses and liverworts of Oxfordshire : being a supplement to the 'Flora of Oxfordshire'. Oxford: Holywell Press.
- — (1926). The flora of Buckinghamshire. Arbroath: Buncle.
- Trower, Charlotte Georgina; Watson, William Charles Richard (1929). — (ed.). British Brambles. Arbroath: Buncle.
- — (1929). The flora of West Ross. Arbroath: Buncle.
- — (1930). The flora of Northamptonshire. Arbroath: Buncle.
- — (1932). The comital flora of the British Isles. Arbroath: Buncle.
