= Idioglossia (play) =

1985 play by Mark Handley

- Original language: English
- Written by: Mark Handley
- Characters: Nell; T.C: psychologist Claude: linguist Jake: psychologist
- Genre: Drama
- Setting: Backcountry

Premiere
- Date: 1985
- Place: University of Utah, Salt Lake City

Idioglossia is a play by American playwright Mark Handley about a woman who grew up – and most notably, learned to speak – isolated from society. It served as inspiration for the 1994 film Nell.

The title comes from the medical term "idioglossia", meaning an idiosyncratic language that few speak, and associated with "cryptophasia".

== Synopsis ==
In the deep back country, a teenage boy discovers that a local hermit has died. A doctor and local police go to her primitive cabin, where they find a younger, seemingly half-crazed woman whose speech seems to be nothing but unintelligible babbling. She is thought to be a "wild child" at first, and protective services needs to evaluate if she can live independently. A linguist is called in to observe the woman and determine if it's possible to communicate with her.

Through intensive interactions, the researchers find out that the woman's name is Nell and learn to speak her language. The language is, as it turns out, largely based on English. But as the young Nell had learned English from a single speaker, her mother's severe speech impediment (caused by paralysis on one side of her face, following a stroke) was an inextricable feature of how she'd learned to speak. Many terms were not based on English, however, and instead came from an idioglottic language Nell had used with her late sister.

== Background ==
The play was inspired by Handley's own life. In the 1970s, he and his wife moved to a remote area, living in a cabin in the Cascade Mountains. Handley had a rough time living in these conditions. He said "my disappointment in not succeeding at that life, made me want to create a character who could succeed at it. I invented Nell so she could teach me." The play was also inspired by an article he saw in the newspaper about a pair of twins in San Diego, Poto and Cabengo, who shared a secret language.

The play was first workshopped at the Sundance Playwrights Institute, and again by the Empty Space Theatre in Seattle.

== Production history ==
The first production of the play was performed in the Babcock Theater at the University of Utah, in the fall of 1985, under the direction of Kenneth Washington. It featured student actors: Michael Kirkland (Jake), Sharon Jensen (Nell), Jackie Bromstedt (TC), and faculty member Sandy Shotwell in the role of Claude. It was then selected to compete in the American College Theatre Festival's 1986 regional competition in Colorado Springs. On the strength of this showing it was selected to be presented at the Kennedy Center of the Performing Arts as one of the 1986 National Winners.

The play was then revived by the Group Theatre in Seattle, Washington in 1987.

The play was first covered by the New York Times when it was shown at the George Street Playhouse in New Brunswick, New Jersey.

In 1987 the play was performed in Washington, D.C., at the New Playwrights Theatre.

The play was produced in Los Angeles by the Odyssey Theatre Ensemble in 1989.

== Historical casting ==
Character	1987 Seattle cast	1987 Washington DC. cast	1989 Los Angeles Cast	1992 George Street cast	1994 Film cast
Nell Kellty	Annette Romano	Karin Abromaitis	Beth Hogan	Deanna Deignan	Jodie Foster
T.C.	N/A	Mary Ellen Nester	Audree Chapman	Allison Janney	Natasha Richardson

== Film adaptation ==
In 1994 the play was adapted into the film Nell starring Jodie Foster and Liam Neeson. Foster had heard of the play, and purchased the film rights. Her friend and producer Renée Missel saw the Los Angeles production in 1989 and the two contacted Handley. The film script differs greatly from the stage play, with a script also by Handley, co-written with William Nicholson. Jodie Foster was nominated for the Academy Award for Best Actress for her performance.
