= List of actors nominated for Academy Awards for non-English performances =

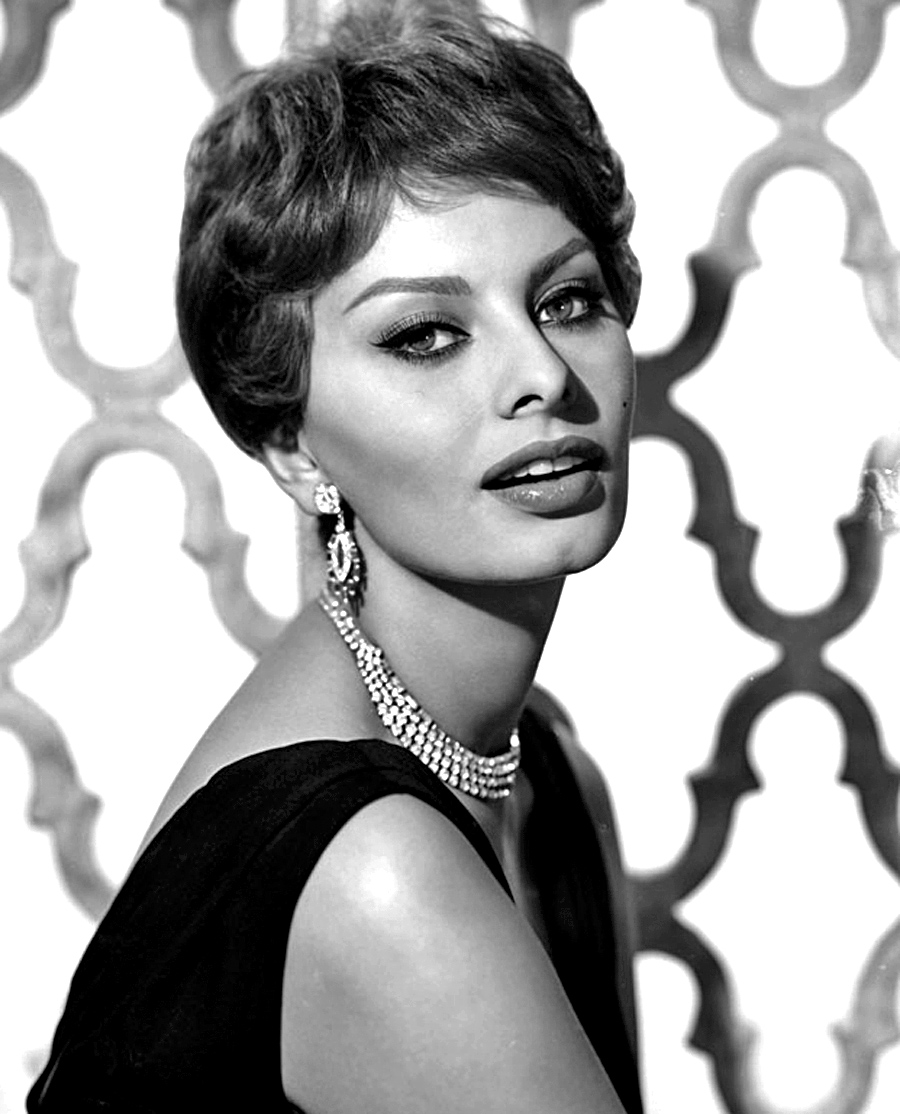
Sophia Loren received an Academy Award for Best Actress for her performance in Two Women (1960) and a Best Actress nomination for Marriage Italian Style (1964).

The Academy of Motion Picture Arts and Sciences has given Academy Awards to actors and actresses for non-English performances in films, with the first award given in 1962. For an actor or actress to be eligible for any of the Academy Awards for Best Actor, Best Actress, Best Supporting Actor, or Best Supporting Actress for a foreign language performance in a film produced outside the United States, the film must have been commercially released in Los Angeles County and have English subtitles with the theatrical release.

This list is current as of the 98th Academy Awards ceremony held on March 15, 2026.

In 1962, Sophia Loren became the first actor to win an Oscar for a fully non-English spoken language performance.

== Statistics ==
As of 2026, 86 actors and actresses have been nominated for Academy Awards for primarily non-English language performances. 24 of these actors and actresses have received Academy Awards for their performances:

- Seven actors have won for performances that were mostly or solely spoken in a language other than English: Sophia Loren for Two Women (Italian), Robert De Niro for The Godfather Part II (Sicilian), Roberto Benigni for Life Is Beautiful (Italian), Benicio del Toro for Traffic (Spanish), Marion Cotillard for La Vie en Rose (French), Youn Yuh-jung for Minari (Korean), and Zoe Saldaña for Emilia Pérez (Spanish).
- Eleven actors have won for multilingual performances mostly spoken in English: Anna Magnani for The Rose Tattoo (English and Italian); both Joel Grey and Liza Minnelli for Cabaret (English and German, either spoken or sung); Ben Kingsley for Gandhi (English and Hindi); Meryl Streep for Sophie's Choice (English, German, and Polish); Penélope Cruz for Vicky Cristina Barcelona (English and Spanish); Christoph Waltz for Inglourious Basterds (English, German, and French); Leonardo DiCaprio for The Revenant (English and Pawnee); both Ke Huy Quan and Michelle Yeoh for Everything Everywhere All at Once (English and Mandarin—in addition to Cantonese from Yeoh); and Adrien Brody for The Brutalist (English and Hungarian).
- Six actors have won for performances that were mostly or solely in sign language: Jane Wyman for Johnny Belinda (American Sign Language [ASL]), Patty Duke for The Miracle Worker (ASL), John Mills for Ryan's Daughter (British Sign Language [BSL]), Marlee Matlin for Children of a Lesser God (ASL), Holly Hunter for The Piano (Unique Sign Language),^{[F]} and Troy Kotsur for CODA (ASL).

Seven actors have had multiple Academy Award nominations for non-English language performances: Marcello Mastroianni (three Best Actor nominations for Italian-language performances); Sophia Loren (one Academy Award win for Best Actress for Two Women and another Best Actress nomination for Marriage Italian Style, both for Italian-language performances); Liv Ullmann (two Best Actress nominations for Swedish-language performances); Isabelle Adjani (two Best Actress nominations for French-language performances); Javier Bardem (two Best Actor nominations for Spanish-language performances); Marion Cotillard (one Academy Award win for Best Actress for La Vie en Rose (2007) and another Best Actress nomination for Two Days, One Night (2014), both for French-language performances); and Penélope Cruz (two Best Actress nominations for Spanish-language performances, in addition to her aforementioned multilingual Supporting Actress win).

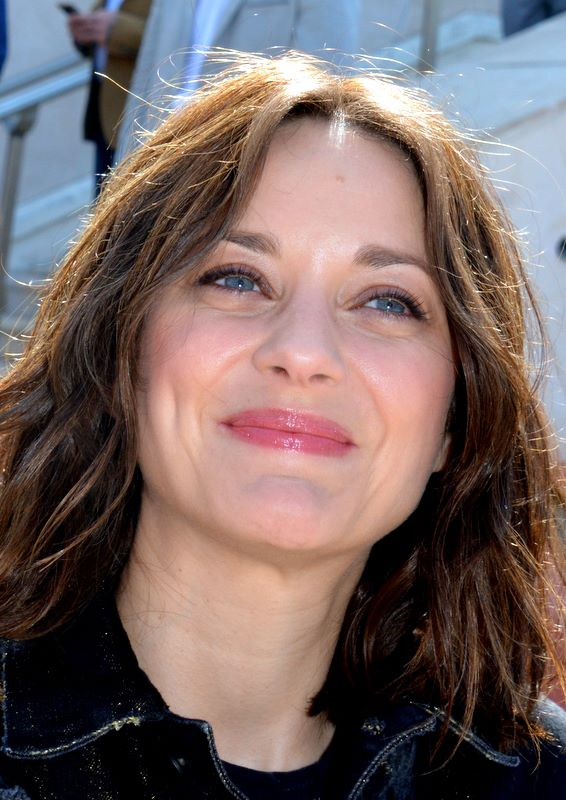
Marion Cotillard received an Academy Award for Best Actress for her performance in La Vie en Rose (2007) and a Best Actress nomination for Two Days, One Night (2014).

Sophia Loren and Marion Cotillard are the only actresses to win an Academy Award for Best Actress for non-English language performances—Italian and French, respectively. Cotillard is the only actor to receive two Oscar nominations for foreign films without having either of her films nominated for an Academy Award for Best Foreign Language Film, and she is also the only actor to be nominated for a Belgian film (Two Days, One Night (2014)).

Roberto Benigni is the only actor to win an Academy Award for Best Actor for a non-English language performance. In supporting categories, Robert De Niro and Benicio Del Toro are the only two Supporting Actors to win for non-English performances, while Youn Yuh-jung and Zoe Saldaña are the only two Supporting Actress winners. Each of these actors’ performances were from Best Picture nominees—except for De Niro, whose film The Godfather Part II (1974) won Best Picture.

Fifteen actors have been nominated for Sign Language performances: Jane Wyman and Lew Ayres for Johnny Belinda;^{[B]} Patty Duke for The Miracle Worker; Alan Arkin for The Heart Is a Lonely Hunter; John Mills for Ryan's Daughter; Lily Tomlin for Nashville;^{[D]} Marlee Matlin, William Hurt, and Piper Laurie for Children of a Lesser God;^{[E]} Holly Hunter for The Piano; Samantha Morton for Sweet and Lowdown; Rinko Kikuchi for Babel; Sally Hawkins for The Shape of Water; Riz Ahmed and Paul Raci for Sound of Metal; and Troy Kotsur for CODA. All used American Sign Language—except for Mills, who used British Sign Language; Kikuchi, who used Japanese Sign Language; and Hunter, who utilized a blended sign language consisting of American, British, Russian, Indigenous, and several newly devised signs created specifically for her character.^{[F]}

In 2026, a record four primarily non-English language performances were nominated for the 98th Academy Awards: Wagner Moura for The Secret Agent (2025) (Portuguese); and Renate Reinsve, Inga Ibsdotter Lilleaas, and Stellan Skarsgård for Sentimental Value (2025) (Norwegian, Norwegian, and Swedish, respectively). The previous record of three was set in 1976.

== Nominees ==
| Year (Ceremony) | Actor/Actress | Category | Film title used in nomination | Original title | Language | Result |
|---|---|---|---|---|---|---|
| 1948 (21st) | Jane Wyman | Best Actress | Johnny Belinda^{[A]} | Johnny Belinda | American Sign Language | Won Academy Award |
| 1948 (21st) | Lew Ayres | Best Actor | Johnny Belinda^{[A]} | Johnny Belinda | English, American Sign Language^{[B]} | Nominee |
| 1955 (28th) | Anna Magnani | Best Actress | The Rose Tattoo^{[A]} | La rosa tatuata | English, Italian | Won Academy Award |
| 1960 (33rd) | Melina Mercouri | Best Actress | Never on Sunday^{[A]} | Ποτέ την Κυριακή | Greek, English | Nominee |
| 1961 (34th) | Sophia Loren^{[C]} | Best Actress | Two Women | La ciociara | Italian | Won Academy Award |
| 1962 (35th) | Patty Duke | Best Supporting Actress | The Miracle Worker^{[A]} | The Miracle Worker | American Sign Language | Won Academy Award |
| 1962 (35th) | Marcello Mastroianni | Best Actor | Divorce Italian Style | Divorzio all'italiana | Italian | Nominee |
| 1964 (37th) | Anthony Quinn | Best Actor | Zorba the Greek^{[A]} | Αλέξης Ζορμπάς | English, Greek | Nominee |
| 1964 (37th) | Sophia Loren^{[C]} | Best Actress | Marriage Italian Style | Matrimonio all'Italiana | Italian | Nominee |
| 1966 (39th) | Anouk Aimée | Best Actress | A Man and a Woman | Un homme et une femme | French | Nominee |
| 1966 (39th) | Ida Kamińska | Best Actress | The Shop on Main Street | Obchod na korze | Slovak, Yiddish | Nominee |
| 1968 (41st) | Alan Arkin | Best Actor | The Heart Is a Lonely Hunter^{[A]} | The Heart Is a Lonely Hunter | American Sign Language | Nominee |
| 1970 (43rd) | John Mills | Best Supporting Actor | Ryan's Daughter^{[A]} | Ryan's Daughter | British Sign Language | Won Academy Award |
| 1972 (45th) | Joel Grey | Best Supporting Actor | Cabaret^{[A]} | Cabaret | English, German | Won Academy Award |
| 1972 (45th) | Liza Minnelli | Best Actress | Cabaret^{[A]} | Cabaret | English, German | Won Academy Award |
| 1972 (45th) | Liv Ullmann^{[C]} | Best Actress | The Emigrants | Utvandrarna | Swedish | Nominee |
| 1974 (47th) | Robert De Niro | Best Supporting Actor | The Godfather Part II^{[A]} | The Godfather Part II | Sicilian | Won Academy Award |
| 1974 (47th) | Valentina Cortese | Best Supporting Actress | Day for Night | La Nuit américaine | French | Nominee |
| 1975 (48th) | Lily Tomlin | Best Supporting Actress | Nashville^{[A]} | Nashville | English, American Sign Language^{[D]} | Nominee |
| 1975 (48th) | Isabelle Adjani | Best Actress | The Story of Adele H. | L'Histoire d'Adèle H. | French | Nominee |
| 1975 (48th) | Carol Kane | Best Actress | Hester Street^{[A]} | Hester Street | Yiddish, English | Nominee |
| 1976 (49th) | Marie-Christine Barrault | Best Actress | Cousin Cousine | Cousin, cousine | French | Nominee |
| 1976 (49th) | Liv Ullmann^{[C]} | Best Actress | Face to Face | Ansikte mot ansikte | Swedish | Nominee |
| 1976 (49th) | Giancarlo Giannini | Best Actor | Seven Beauties | Pasqualino Settebellezze | Italian | Nominee |
| 1977 (50th) | Marcello Mastroianni | Best Actor | A Special Day | Una giornata particolare | Italian | Nominee |
| 1978 (51st) | Ingrid Bergman | Best Actress | Autumn Sonata | Höstsonaten | Swedish | Nominee |
| 1982 (55th) | Ben Kingsley | Best Actor | Gandhi^{[A]} | Gandhi | English, Hindi | Won Academy Award |
| 1982 (55th) | Meryl Streep | Best Actress | Sophie's Choice^{[A]} | Sophie's Choice | English, German, Polish | Won Academy Award |
| 1986 (59th) | Marlee Matlin | Best Actress | Children of a Lesser God^{[A]} | Children of a Lesser God | American Sign Language | Won Academy Award |
| 1986 (59th) | William Hurt | Best Actor | Children of a Lesser God^{[A]} | Children of a Lesser God | English, American Sign Language^{[E]} | Nominee |
| 1986 (59th) | Piper Laurie | Best Supporting Actress | Children of a Lesser God^{[A]} | Children of a Lesser God | English, American Sign Language^{[E]} | Nominee |
| 1987 (60th) | Marcello Mastroianni | Best Actor | Dark Eyes | Oci ciornie | Italian | Nominee |
| 1988 (61st) | Max von Sydow | Best Actor | Pelle the Conqueror | Pelle Erobreren | Swedish | Nominee |
| 1989 (62nd) | Isabelle Adjani | Best Actress | Camille Claudel | Camille Claudel | French | Nominee |
| 1990 (63rd) | Gérard Depardieu | Best Actor | Cyrano de Bergerac | Cyrano de Bergerac | French | Nominee |
| 1990 (63rd) | Graham Greene | Best Supporting Actor | Dances with Wolves^{[A]} | Dances with Wolves | Lakota | Nominee |
| 1992 (65th) | Catherine Deneuve | Best Actress | Indochine | Indochine | French | Nominee |
| 1993 (66th) | Holly Hunter | Best Actress | The Piano^{[A]} | The Piano | Original Sign Language^{[F]} | Won Academy Award |
| 1994 (67th) | Jodie Foster | Best Actress | Nell^{[A]} | Nell | Idioglossia^{[G]} | Nominee |
| 1995 (68th) | Massimo Troisi | Best Actor | Il Postino: The Postman | Il Postino | Italian | Nominee |
| 1998 (71st) | Roberto Benigni | Best Actor | Life Is Beautiful | La vita è bella | Italian | Won Academy Award |
| 1998 (71st) | Fernanda Montenegro | Best Actress | Central Station | Central do Brasil | Portuguese | Nominee |
| 1999 (72nd) | Samantha Morton | Best Supporting Actress | Sweet and Lowdown^{[A]} | Sweet and Lowdown | American Sign Language | Nominee |
| 2000 (73rd) | Javier Bardem | Best Actor | Before Night Falls^{[A]} | Before Night Falls | Spanish | Nominee |
| 2000 (73rd) | Benicio del Toro | Best Supporting Actor | Traffic^{[A]} | Traffic | Spanish | Won Academy Award |
| 2003 (76th) | Shohreh Aghdashloo | Best Supporting Actress | House of Sand and Fog^{[A]} | House of Sand and Fog | English, Persian | Nominee |
| 2003 (76th) | Ben Kingsley | Best Actor | House of Sand and Fog^{[A]} | House of Sand and Fog | English, Persian | Nominee |
| 2004 (77th) | Catalina Sandino Moreno | Best Actress | Maria Full of Grace | María llena eres de gracia | Spanish | Nominee |
| 2006 (79th) | Penélope Cruz | Best Actress | Volver | Volver | Spanish | Nominee |
| 2006 (79th) | Adriana Barraza | Best Supporting Actress | Babel^{[A]} | Babel | English, Spanish | Nominee |
| 2006 (79th) | Rinko Kikuchi | Best Supporting Actress | Babel^{[A]} | Babel | Japanese Sign Language | Nominee |
| 2007 (80th) | Marion Cotillard | Best Actress | La Vie en Rose | La Môme | French | Won Academy Award |
| 2008 (81st) | Penélope Cruz | Best Supporting Actress | Vicky Cristina Barcelona^{[A]} | Vicky Cristina Barcelona | English, Spanish | Won Academy Award |
| 2009 (82nd) | Christoph Waltz | Best Supporting Actor | Inglourious Basterds^{[A]} | Inglourious Basterds | English, German, French | Won Academy Award |
| 2010 (83rd) | Javier Bardem | Best Actor | Biutiful | Biutiful | Spanish | Nominee |
| 2011 (84th) | Demián Bichir | Best Actor | A Better Life^{[A]} | A Better Life | English, Spanish | Nominee |
| 2012 (85th) | Emmanuelle Riva | Best Actress | Amour | Amour | French | Nominee |
| 2013 (86th) | Barkhad Abdi | Best Supporting Actor | Captain Phillips^{[A]} | Captain Phillips | English, Somali | Nominee |
| 2014 (87th) | Marion Cotillard | Best Actress | Two Days, One Night | Deux jours, une nuit | French | Nominee |
| 2015 (88th) | Leonardo DiCaprio | Best Actor | The Revenant^{[A]} | The Revenant | English, Pawnee | Won Academy Award |
| 2016 (89th) | Isabelle Huppert | Best Actress | Elle | Elle | French | Nominee |
| 2017 (90th) | Timothée Chalamet | Best Actor | Call Me by Your Name^{[A]} | Call Me by Your Name | English, French, Italian | Nominee |
| 2017 (90th) | Sally Hawkins | Best Actress | The Shape of Water^{[A]} | The Shape of Water | American Sign Language | Nominee |
| 2018 (91st) | Yalitza Aparicio | Best Actress | Roma | Roma | Spanish, Mixtec | Nominee |
| 2018 (91st) | Marina de Tavira | Best Supporting Actress | Roma | Roma | Spanish | Nominee |
| 2019 (92nd) | Antonio Banderas | Best Actor | Pain and Glory | Dolor y Gloria | Spanish | Nominee |
| 2020 (93rd) | Riz Ahmed | Best Actor | Sound of Metal^{[A]} | Sound of Metal | English, American Sign Language | Nominee |
| 2020 (93rd) | Paul Raci | Best Supporting Actor | Sound of Metal^{[A]} | Sound of Metal | English, American Sign Language | Nominee |
| 2020 (93rd) | Steven Yeun | Best Actor | Minari^{[A]} | 미나리 | Korean, English | Nominee |
| 2020 (93rd) | Youn Yuh-jung | Best Supporting Actress | Minari^{[A]} | 미나리 | Korean, English | Won Academy Award |
| 2021 (94th) | Penélope Cruz | Best Actress | Parallel Mothers | Madres paralelas | Spanish | Nominee |
| 2021 (94th) | Troy Kotsur | Best Supporting Actor | CODA^{[A]} | CODA | American Sign Language | Won Academy Award |
| 2022 (95th) | Ke Huy Quan | Best Supporting Actor | Everything Everywhere All at Once^{[A]} | Everything Everywhere All at Once | English, Mandarin Chinese | Won Academy Award |
| 2022 (95th) | Michelle Yeoh | Best Actress | Everything Everywhere All at Once^{[A]} | Everything Everywhere All at Once | English, Mandarin Chinese, Cantonese | Won Academy Award |
| 2023 (96th) | Lily Gladstone | Best Actress | Killers of the Flower Moon^{[A]} | Killers of the Flower Moon | English, Osage | Nominee |
| 2023 (96th) | Sandra Hüller | Best Actress | Anatomy of a Fall^{[H]} | Anatomie d'une chute | English, French | Nominee |
| 2024 (97th) | Yura Borisov | Best Supporting Actor | Anora^{[A]} | Anora | English, Russian | Nominee |
| 2024 (97th) | Adrien Brody | Best Actor | The Brutalist^{[A]} | The Brutalist | English, Hungarian^{[I]} | Won Academy Award |
| 2024 (97th) | Felicity Jones | Best Supporting Actress | The Brutalist^{[A]} | The Brutalist | English, Hungarian^{[I]} | Nominee |
| 2024 (97th) | Zoe Saldaña | Best Supporting Actress | Emilia Pérez | Emilia Pérez | Spanish, English | Won Academy Award |
| 2024 (97th) | Karla Sofía Gascón | Best Actress | Emilia Pérez | Emilia Pérez | Spanish, English | Nominee |
| 2024 (97th) | Fernanda Torres | Best Actress | I'm Still Here | Ainda Estou Aqui | Portuguese | Nominee |
| 2025 (98th) | Wagner Moura | Best Actor | The Secret Agent | O Agente Secreto | Portuguese | Nominee |
| 2025 (98th) | Renate Reinsve | Best Actress | Sentimental Value^{[J]} | Affeksjonsverdi | Norwegian, English | Nominee |
| 2025 (98th) | Inga Ibsdotter Lilleaas | Best Supporting Actress | Sentimental Value^{[J]} | Affeksjonsverdi | Norwegian, English | Nominee |
| 2025 (98th) | Stellan Skarsgård | Best Supporting Actor | Sentimental Value^{[J]} | Affeksjonsverdi | Swedish, English | Nominee |

== Notes ==
- ^{A} The film was produced in the United States and/or contains primarily English dialogue.
- ^{B} Although his role contained simultaneously spoken English dialogue, Lew Ayres utilized American Sign Language throughout his performance during Jane Wyman's titular character's ASL tutelage in Johnny Belinda (1948).
- ^{C} Both Sophia Loren and Liv Ullmann were recipients of the Academy Honorary Award, in 1991 and 2022, respectively.
- ^{D} Despite being a hearing character who spoke English, Lily Tomlin utilized ASL to communicate with her character's two deaf children.
- ^{E} Although their parts contained simultaneously spoken English dialogue, William Hurt and Piper Laurie also utilized American Sign Language throughout their performances opposite Marlee Matlin in Children of a Lesser God (1986).
- ^{F} Holly Hunter collaborated extensively with Pierce College sign language instructor Darlene Allen Wittman, blending American, British, Russian, Indigenous, and even comprising unique new signs, into an amalgamated sign language for her character Ada in The Piano (1993).
- ^{G} Jodie Foster's dialogue in Nell (1994) was primarily in idioglossia, due to her character's upbringing.
- ^{H} Sandra Hüller speaks mostly English in Anatomy of a Fall (2023). 59% of the film is spoken in French.
- ^{I} Artificial intelligence was utilized to perfect the Hungarian accents within the dialogue, which resulted in controversy.
- ^{J} Different characters utilized a variety of languages, thus speaking in multiple dialects to one another.

== Most nominated languages ==
- BA = Best Actor/Actress nominations.
- BSA = Best Supporting Actor/Actress nominations.

| Rank | Language | BA | BSA | Total | Wins | Winning actor(s) |
|---|---|---|---|---|---|---|
| 1 | French | 12 | 2 | 14 | 2 | Marion Cotillard (2007), Christoph Waltz (2009) |
| 1 | Spanish | 9 | 5 | 14 | 3 | Benicio del Toro (2000), Penélope Cruz (2008), Zoe Saldaña (2024) |
| 2 | American Sign Language | 7 | 4 | 11 | 4 | Jane Wyman (1948), Patty Duke (1962), Marlee Matlin (1986), Troy Kotsur (2021) |
| 3 | Italian | 10 | 0 | 10 | 3 | Anna Magnani (1955), Sophia Loren (1961), Roberto Benigni (1998) |
| 4 | Swedish | 4 | 1 | 5 | 0 | —N/a |
| 5 | Portuguese | 3 | 0 | 3 | 0 | —N/a |
| 6 | German | 1 | 1 | 2 | 2 | Meryl Streep (1982), Christoph Waltz (2009) |
| 6 | Greek | 2 | 0 | 2 | 0 | —N/a |
| 6 | Hungarian | 1 | 1 | 2 | 1 | Adrien Brody (2024) |
| 6 | Korean | 1 | 1 | 2 | 1 | Youn Yuh-jung (2020) |
| 6 | Mandarin Chinese | 1 | 1 | 2 | 2 | Ke Huy Quan, Michelle Yeoh (2022) |
| 6 | Norwegian | 1 | 1 | 2 | 0 | —N/a |
| 6 | Persian | 1 | 1 | 2 | 0 | —N/a |
| 6 | Yiddish | 2 | 0 | 2 | 0 | —N/a |

== See also ==
- List of actors with more than one Academy Award nomination in the acting categories
- List of Academy Award–winning foreign-language films
- List of Academy Award records
- List of Academy Award winners and nominees for Best International Feature Film
