= Familect =

Words unique to a family

A familect or marriage language is a set of invented words or phrases with meanings understood within members of a family or other small intimate group. Among the pioneers of research on familects is Cynthia Gordon, professor of linguistics at Georgetown University, who discussed the concept in her 2009 book Making Meanings, Creating Family. Familects fall within the intimate register of communication.

Familects often gain vocabulary through the words young children create as they learn to talk, when these words are adopted by the family. Familects also gain vocabulary through slips of the tongue and word invention.

== See also ==
- Idiolect - dialect of a single person
- Idioglossia - dialect of two people especially twins
- In-joke - idioms shared by two or more people
