= Zypora Spaisman =

American actress

- Born: Zypora Tannenbaum; January 2, 1916; Lublin, Poland
- Died: May 18, 2002 (aged 86); New York City, United States
- Occupations: Actress, Yiddish theatre empresaria

Zypora Spaisman (January 2, 1916 in Lublin, Poland – May 18, 2002 in New York City) was an actress and Yiddish theatre empresaria.

== Life in Poland ==
Spaisman was born Zypora Tannenbaum. She began acting at the age of 10, but for much of her life she worked in her native Poland as a midwife. In 1938, she married Joseph Spaisman. In 1939, when Nazis invaded Poland, she witnessed her sister being shot. After this, the family moved to the Soviet-controlled region of Poland, and then were taken to a labor camp in the Ural Mountains. There, she continued to work as a midwife and to put together Yiddish plays. Upon returning to Poland after World War II, she continued her Yiddish theatre work. However, her entire family had been killed, as had most Jews in Poland. The Spaismans thus emigrated to the United States in 1955.

== Career in the United States ==
Spaisman, during her career as an actress, was long associated with the Folksbiene Yiddish Theatre in New York City. For several years, Spaisman was executive producer for the theatre while continuing to act.

In 1998, Spaisman's position with the company was replaced by Zalmen Mlotek and Eleanor Reissa, who were named co-artistic directors. They invited Spaisman to stay on as a consultant. However, Spaisman's vision for the Folksbiene differed from the new directors' vision: while the new directors wished to modernize, Spaisman wanted the theatre to preserve Yiddish art and culture. As such, Spaisman left the Folksbiene and formed the Yiddish Public Theater.

In the summers, Spaisman worked as a camp nurse at Camp Boiberik, in Rhinebeck, NY (an offshoot of the Sholem Aleichem Folk Institute).

Spaisman also had some film roles. She played the role of Sheva Haddas in Paul Mazursky's film Enemies, A Love Story (1989), an adaptation of Isaac Bashevis Singer's novel of the same name. She also acted alongside Michael J. Fox in The Hard Way.

A documentary by Dan Katzir about Spaisman and the Yiddish Public Theater, Yiddish Theater: A Love Story, was released in 2006.

== Death ==
She was married to Joseph Spaisman until his death; the couple had one son, who survived her following her death from a brain hemorrhage on May 18, 2002, aged 86.
