= Roger L. Simon =

American screenwriter and screenwriter (born 1943)

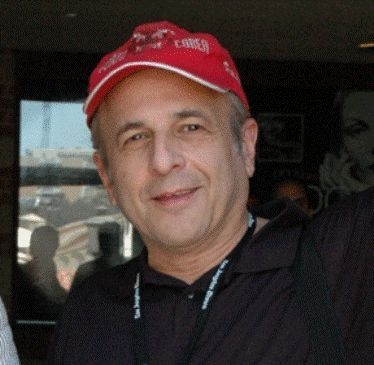
- Simon before 2007
- Born: Roger Lichtenberg Simon; November 22, 1943 (age 82); New York City, U.S.
- Education: Dartmouth College (BA); Yale University (MFA)
- Occupations: Novelist; screenwriter; chief executive officer of Pajamas Media

Roger Lichtenberg Simon (born November 22, 1943) is an American novelist and screenwriter. He was formerly CEO of PJ Media (formerly known as Pajamas Media) and is now its CEO Emeritus. He is the author of eleven novels, including the Moses Wine detective series, seven produced screenplays and two non-fiction books. He has served as president of the West Coast branch of PEN, and as a member of the Board of Directors of the Writers Guild of America; he was also on the faculty of the American Film Institute and the Sundance Institute.

He has contributed to The New York Times, The Wall Street Journal, the Los Angeles Times, Commentary, RealClearPolitics, City Journal and The Epoch Times where he served as Eidtor-at-large. Simon has also been a Hoover Institution Media Fellow.

Simon's most recent work, EMET, was published in March 2026 by Green Hills Books. It is the first in a new series.

From December 1, 2019 through November1, 2025, Simon moved his journalism exclusively to The Epoch Times as their Editor-at-Large.

== PJ Media ==
Simon was the co-founder of PJ Media and served as its CEO a until 2013. PJ Media is a media company and operator of an eponymous conservative opinion and commentary website. Founded in 2004 by a network primarily, but not exclusively, made up of conservatives and libertarians led by Simon, it was originally intended as a forum "with the intention of... aggregating blogs to increase corporate advertising and creating our own professional news service" but later included an online television service, PJTV, as well. PJ Media's name, formerly Pajamas Media, is derived from a dismissive comment made by former news executive vice-president Jonathan Klein of CBS during the Killian documents affair involving then-CBS anchorman Dan Rather in the fall of 2004: "You couldn't have a starker contrast between the multiple layers of checks and balances at 60 Minutes and a guy sitting in his living room in his pajamas". PJ Media was sold to Salem Communications in March 2019. Simon continues his affiliation with the company as co-founder and CEO Emeritus.

== Books ==
=== Moses Wine series ===
==== The Big Fix ====
Roger L. Simon began to develop the idea for Moses Wine when Alan Rinzler, who was working as an editor at Straight Arrow Books, a venture by Rolling Stone, suggested that a book Simon had written about a veteran of the Bay of Pigs Invasion who goes crazy and kidnaps the son of a radical lawyer, had poor commercial prospects. Rinzler suggested that Simon do something "more Rolling Stone".

In response, Simon, who had recently been exploring the works of Raymond Chandler and Ross Macdonald came up with the idea of updating the private-eye genre with a "hip, political, and edgy longhair". Six weeks later, Simon had finished the first Moses Wine novel, The Big Fix. At the time, Simon was living in Echo Park, California, where many of the stories in the Moses Wine series take place. Moses Wine was different from other fictional detectives that Simon saw as devoid of ethnicity, family, friends, or interests outside of work. In Moses Wine, Simon created a character that was proudly Jewish, divorced, and given to smoking marijuana. The cases taken on by Moses Wine were also unconventional. "The Big Fix" focused on the case of an Abbie Hoffman-like radical prankster who attempts to derail the presidential candidacy of a liberal democrat. "The Big Fix" won several awards and became a best-seller. It was later turned into a popular movie starring Richard Dreyfuss in 1978 for which Simon wrote the screenplay.

==== Raising the Dead ====
In "Raising the Dead", Wine is retained by an Arab organization to prove that it had nothing to do with a terrorist attack. Most of the story takes place in Israel and Los Angeles, where a young member of a militant Jewish group has gone underground.

Responding to speculation that he had uncovered information related to the killing of Alex Odeh, a regional director for the American-Arab Anti-Discrimination League who had spoken out regarding the takeover of an Italian cruise-ship by Palestinians, Simon said that while he had visited Israel twice and talked to Jews and Arabs in the West Bank, he had not made any inquiries about the case. Simon said, "This is not fact, this is fiction. If I had accidentally uncovered any information, I would have gone right to the FBI. It's a capital case."

==== California Roll ====
At the start of California Roll, Wine is feeling his age and recovering from a mid-life crisis when he is invited to Silicon Valley by Alex Wiznitsky, a young genius known as the Wiz, who wants him to become head of security for Tulip, a computer company that rose from backstreet obscurity into the Fortune 500 in only three years. Soon after, one of the Wiz's collaborators, another genius known as the Last Nerd, has disappeared. Wine eventually follows the case to Japan where roughly half the story takes place.

==== The Straight Man ====
In "The Straight Man" Wine has quit his posh job in corporate security and is back in West Los Angeles where he is half-heartedly doing private detective work from his apartment while trying to cure his mental angst with regular visits to a psychiatrist. This psychiatrist, himself disabled and using a wheelchair, asks Wine to investigate a possible murder. The dead man, Mike Ptak, was the husband of a patient being treated by the psychiatrist.

==== Moses Wine as autobiography ====
Simon says that the books are partially autobiographical. He said, "the series reflects where I was and where I am. It's my diary. I have to have some new thing happening in my life that engages me. I wrap a mystery around that. That's why there aren't more books. I've always been told that I should be doing one every year-and-a-half. I can't. I can't treat it like a television series, every week a new mystery." Simon published eight books about Wine over a 30-year period, from 1974 to 2003.

=== Non-fiction books ===
==== Turning Right at Hollywood and Vine: The Perils of Coming Out Conservative in Tinseltown ====
First published as "Blacklisting Myself", this short memoir was Simon's first book-length work of non-fiction. It describes his gradual political turn from left to right as well as many personal adventures in movie business working with such well known figures as Richard Dreyfuss, Richard Pryor, Woody Allen and Paul Mazursky.

==== I Know Best: How Moral Narcissism Is Destroying Our Republic, If It Hasn't Already ====
This book argues that moral narcissism is a threat to democracy in the United States. Unlike the conventional narcissism of a Greek youth transfixed by his handsome reflection in a pool, this is a narcissism of ideology. What you proclaim are your ideas and values, Simon warns, not their results are what makes you "good". The first chapter of this book was reprinted in Commentary magazine.

== Screenplays ==
Besides The Big Fix, Simon's other screenwriting credits include Bustin' Loose, with Richard Pryor, Enemies, A Love Story with Anjelica Huston and Ron Silver, My Man Adam which Simon also directed, and Scenes from a Mall, with Woody Allen and Bette Midler. Simon also received story credit on A Better Life, a movie about an undocumented immigrant working as a gardener in Los Angeles while struggling to keep his son away from gangs.

== Awards ==
Simon was nominated for an Academy Award for co-writing the screenplay of the 1989 film Enemies, A Love Story based on the novel by Nobel Prize winner Isaac Bashevis Singer.

The Moses Wine novels have been nominated for the Edgar Awards from the Mystery Writers of America. The Big Fix received the John Creasey Award for best first crime novel from the Crime Writers of Great Britain.

== Political views ==
Simon remained conventionally liberal until the 1990s when he began asking questions in response to events such as the O.J. Simpson murder trial. Simon, a former civil rights activist in the 1960s, said he was shocked by "the kind of essential dishonesty to justice" of Simpson's acquittal. Simon said, "I found the use of racial politics in the O.J. trial so repellent to me, morally, but also, I couldn't believe it was happening right there in front of my eyes. It started to shake up some things. And then came 9/11."

Simon experienced a political transformation in which he felt alienated from what he saw as the excesses of the Left after the realities of the September 11 attacks affected him. He jokes, "I may be the first American writer who was profiled both by Mother Jones and National Review." He supports same-sex marriage and the war on terror, and contends that those issues are linked. He also edits a weblog. In 2005 he founded, with jazz guitarist Charles Johnson, webmaster of the Little Green Footballs weblog, a startup company called Pajamas Media. Pajamas Media, now known as PJ Media, expanded in 2008 into Internet television with Pajamas TV, later known as PJTV. Simon, with screenwriter Lionel Chetwynd, hosts PJTV's "Poliwood" show, covering the intersection of politics and Hollywood.

Simon's first non-fiction book, Blacklisting Myself: Memoir of a Hollywood Apostate in the Age of Terror, was published by Encounter Books in February 2009. It was republished in 2011 with additional material under the title Turning Right at Hollywood and Vine: The Perils of Coming Out Conservative in Tinseltown

In May 2015, Simon began writing the Diary of a Mad Voter blog for PJ Media to cover the presidential election of 2016, interviewing major candidates in print and video.

Simon's recent book -I Know Best: How Moral Narcissism Is Destroying Our Republic, If It hasn't Already – was published by Encounter Books in June 2016.

== Education and personal life ==
Born to a Jewish family in New York City on November 22, 1943, Simon is a graduate of Dartmouth College and the Yale School of Drama. He has been married three times. He is married to Sheryl Longin, who wrote the screenplay for Dick, a film spoof of events in the Watergate political scandal. In 1997 Simon directed the feature film Prague Duet based on a script he wrote with Longin. They have lived in Nashville, Tennessee with their daughter.

== Publications ==
=== Novels ===
- Heir (also published as Dead Meet) (1968)
- The Mama Tass Manifesto (1970), ISBN 0-03-084528-9
- The Big Fix (1973), ISBN 0-87932-048-6
- Wild Turkey (1974), ISBN 0-87932-082-6
- Peking Duck (1979), ISBN 0-671-22880-3
- California Roll (1985), ISBN 0-394-53711-4
- The Straight Man (1986), ISBN 0-394-55837-5
- Raising the Dead (1988), ISBN 0-394-56441-3
- The Lost Coast (1997), ISBN 0-06-017707-1
- Director's Cut (2003), ISBN 0-7434-5802-8
- The GOAT (2019), ISBN 9780578513973
- EMET (2016), ISBN 979-8-9941093-0-4

=== Play ===
- The Party Line: A Play in Two Acts (with Sheryl Longin) (2012), ISBN 0985905204

=== Produced screenplays ===
- The Big Fix (1978)
- Bustin' Loose (1981)
- My Man Adam (with Renée Missel) (1985) also director
- Enemies, A Love Story (with Paul Mazursky, based on the novel by Isaac Bashevis Singer) (1989)
- Scenes from a Mall (with Paul Mazursky) (1991)
- Prague Duet (with Sheryl Longin) (1998) also director

The 1971 film Jennifer on My Mind and the 2011 film A Better Life were both based on material by Simon, but he did not write the screenplay for either film.

=== Non-fiction ===
- Blacklisting Myself: Memoir of a Hollywood Apostate in the Age of Terror (2009), ISBN 1-59403-247-5
- Turning Right at Hollywood and Vine: The Perils of Coming Out Conservative in Tinseltown (2011), ISBN 1-59403-481-8
- I Know Best (2016), ISBN 1594038058
- American Refugees (2024), ISBN 1641773979
