= Photo fraud =

Photo fraud may refer to:

- Violation of journalism ethics and standards in the area of photojournalism:
  - Photo manipulation
- Adnan Hajj photographs controversy
- 2006 Lebanon War photographs controversies
