= Green Helmet =

Green Helmet or Green Helmets may refer to

- Salam Daher a Lebanese civil defense worker, labelled as "The Green Helmet"
- The Green Helmet, 1961 British film
- Peacekeepers from African nations when operating under the auspices of the African Union
- Green Helmets (Grünhelme) a German aid organization
