= Mark Handley =

American dramatist

- Occupation: Playwright, screenwriter
- Language: English
- Genre: Theater, film

Mark Handley is a playwright and screenwriter.

== Personal life ==
In 1977, he and his wife moved to the Pacific Northwest where they lived in isolation in a log cabin that they built themselves.

== Career ==
He is best known for his play Idioglossia, which was later produced as Jodie Foster's film, Nell. Nell was co-written by Mr. Handley and British Dramatist William Nicholson (Shadowlands). Nell was the first production of Jodie Foster's company Egg Pictures and was directed by Michael Apted.
