= Defenseless =

1991 American thriller film

- Directed by: Martin Campbell
- Written by: James Hicks
- Produced by: Renée Missel and David Bombek
- Starring: Barbara Hershey; Sam Shepard; Mary Beth Hurt; J. T. Walsh
- Cinematography: Phil Méheux
- Edited by: Chris Wimble; Lou Lombardo (supervising editor)
- Music by: Curt Sobel
- Production company: New Visions Pictures
- Distributed by: Seven Arts (through New Line Cinema)
- Release date: August 23, 1991
- Running time: 104 minutes
- Country: United States
- Language: English
- Box office: $6,413,375 (USA)

Defenseless is a 1991 American legal thriller film directed by Martin Campbell and produced by Renee Missel and David Bombek. The film stars Barbara Hershey, Sam Shepard, Mary Beth Hurt and J. T. Walsh. The story follows a defense attorney who is pulled into the murder of her client and lover.

Defenseless was released on August 23, 1991, to mixed reviews from critics and was a box office failure.

== Plot ==
While editing a pornographic film, producer Jack Hammer of Blue Screen Productions is attacked by the father of the film's star, Cindy Bodeck, who is an underaged teenager.

Theodora “T.K.” Katwuller represents Steven Seldes, who is implicated in the film's production. T.K. is also having an affair with Steven, who claims to her that he prioritizes her over his marriage. Detective Frank Beutel also becomes involved in the case. Cindy's mother implies to T.K. that Steven is involved in more illegal porn films, while Cindy's on-screen partner Bull Dozer denies knowing Steven.

T.K. meets and befriends Steven's wife Ellie by chance, and is invited to their home for dinner. There, T.K. meets Steven and Ellie's teenage daughter Janna. The encounter makes T.K. feel guilty about the affair, which she covertly ends.

T.K. visits Steven to return Ellie's sweater and confront him about lying about his family, but the argument turns physical and she stabs Steven in the arm with a letter opener. She is forced to return after leaving her car keys, but instead discovers Steven dead in a bathroom stall. She reports it to the police and is questioned by Beutel as a result.

Ellie is arrested for the murder, but T.K. believes she is being framed. T.K. finds more evidence linking Steven to Blue Screen, especially after Cindy admits she knew Steven. She becomes more suspicious about Ellie as well. T.K. meets Jack Hammer who hints at Steven's preference for "jailbait" and implies she should ask his daughter. T.K. confronts and pressures Janna into revealing that she was manipulated by her father into an incestuous affair and that Hammer produced private sex tapes of the two. T.K. interrogates Ellie again and Ellie reveals she knew about her husband abusing their daughter, and T.K. convinces her to publicly reveal Janna's abuse so she could be proclaimed innocent. At trial, Ellie is acquitted by the jury.

Beutel confronts and arrests T.K. after discovering the bloodied letter opener in her trunk. Ellie visits her in prison, but she exhibits a different demeanor and reveals she knew about her affair with Steven all along. Beutel releases T.K. after sharing her suspicions about Ellie.

T.K. and Beutel confront Ellie together at her home. Ellie breaks down and admits to killing Steven out of anger for his sexual abuse of Janna and his affair with T.K. Janna overhears her mother's confession and they share an embrace before Ellie is taken away. In his car, Beutel reveals he planted the letter opener to draw out Ellie's confession, and T.K. reluctantly accepts his methods to solve the case.

== Cast ==
- Barbara Hershey as Thelma "T.K." Katwuller
- Sam Shepard as Detective Frank Beutel
- Mary Beth Hurt as Ellie Seldes
- J.T. Walsh as Steven Seldes
- Kellie Overbey as Janna Seldes
- Christine Elise as Cindy Bodeck
- Sheree North as Mrs. Bodeck
- George P. Wilbur as Sherman Bodeck
- Jay O. Sanders as "Bull Dozer"
- John Kapelos as Jack Hammer, producer

== Home media ==
Defenseless was initially released on VHS by Live Home Video in the United States and around the same time in Canada by Cineplex Odeon. A television edit of the film was later released on DVD in 2002 by Platinum Disc. In 2007, a widescreen, unedited DVD edition was released exclusively in Japan by Universal Studios Home Entertainment, under license from StudioCanal.
