= The Big Fix (1978 film) =

1978 political comedy thriller film

- Theatrical release poster, with the tagline "...so go figure."
- Directed by: Jeremy Paul Kagan
- Written by: Roger L. Simon
- Based on: The Big Fix by Roger L. Simon
- Produced by: Carl Borack; Richard Dreyfuss
- Starring: Richard Dreyfuss; Susan Anspach; Bonnie Bedelia; John Lithgow; Ofelia Medina; Nicolas Coster; F. Murray Abraham; Fritz Weaver
- Cinematography: Frank Stanley
- Edited by: Patrick Kennedy
- Music by: Bill Conti
- Color process: Technicolor
- Production company: Universal Pictures
- Distributed by: Universal Pictures
- Release date: October 6, 1978
- Running time: 108 minutes
- Country: United States
- Language: English
- Budget: $3,800,000 (estimated)
- Box office: $13,000,000 (USA) (October 1978)

The Big Fix is a 1978 American political comedy thriller film directed by Jeremy Kagan and based on the 1973 novel by Roger L. Simon, who dramatized his own novel for the screen. It stars Richard Dreyfuss as private detective Moses Wine and co-stars Susan Anspach, Bonnie Bedelia, John Lithgow, and F. Murray Abraham.

== Plot ==
Former student radical Moses Wine now works as a private investigator. He is contacted by Lila, an ex-girlfriend from his college days, who is working in the election campaign for Miles Hawthorne, a politician who is running to be Governor of California. Lila takes Moses to meet Hawthorne's campaign coordinator Sam Sebastian, who is concerned about a fake campaign flyer supposedly showing former Berkeley radical Howard Eppis together with Hawthorne and endorsing him. Knowing that Moses was a former contemporary of Eppis, Sam hires him to find out if Eppis is behind it.

Eppis was one of a notorious group of radicals known as the California Four and has been in hiding for years. Moses sets about trying to track him down by contacting some of his old associates. He is given the name of Oscar Procari Jr, the son of a businessman and a supporter of Eppis, who proves elusive. Meanwhile, Moses and Lila visit the printing company and trace the order for the flyers to an electronics store owned by a Korean man, Harold Pak Chung, who disappears after Moses tracks him to a casino. Moses then finds Lila murdered in her apartment. Later he meets with Sam, who seems more concerned about the publicity and the effect it will have on Hawthorne's campaign. Rather than be fired, Moses quits.

Moses encounters a woman named Alora and discovers she is the niece of another of the California Four, Luis Vasquez, who says that her uncle met Lila on the night she died and has now disappeared. Procari's father contacts Moses and they meet. Procari says that he hasn't seen his son in years and blames Eppis for turning his son away from him. Procari offers to pay Moses to find his son, but Moses declines. Meanwhile, Sam re-hires Moses as Eppis has contacted him threatening a series of bombings but that the police think it is a hoax.

Sam gives him a typewritten note with an address, which Moses visits and discovers Eppis now living a comfortable suburban lifestyle and no longer a radical. Moses is followed to the address by two hitmen, who burst in and try to kill them, but leave when Moses triggers an alarm. The hitmen try to kill Moses again at his office, but Alora and her associates ambush them. They interrogate the hitmen and find they were hired by Pak Chung and that they killed Lila when they kidnapped Vasquez, but don't know where he is being held.

Moses calls the police to warn them about the bombings. Pak Chung has rigged a van with explosives and drives it by remote control while Luis Vasquez is unconscious at the wheel. Moses finds Pak Chung near one of the target sites and kills him before he can carry out the bombing. A tape recording is found nearby supposedly by Eppis claiming responsibility for the bombing. Later Sam reveals himself as Oscar Procari and that his father was behind Pak Chung and the attempt to fix the election by implicating Hawthorne with Eppis.

== Cast ==
- Richard Dreyfuss as Moses Wine
- Susan Anspach as Lila Shea
- Bonnie Bedelia as Suzanne
- John Lithgow as Sam Sebastian
- Ofelia Medina as Alora
- Nicolas Coster as Nicholas Spitzler
- F. Murray Abraham as Howard Eppis
- Fritz Weaver as Oscar Procari Sr.
- Ron Rifkin as Randy Esterhaus
- Sidney Clute as Mr. Johnson
- Martin Garner as Sidney Bittleman
- John Cunningham as Hawthorne
- Mandy Patinkin as The Pool Cleaner

== Reception ==
The Big Fix received fairly positive critical reviews. On Rotten Tomatoes, the film holds a rating of 88% from 16 reviews.
