= Renee Missel =

Canadian-American film producer, and a voting member of the Motion Picture Academy

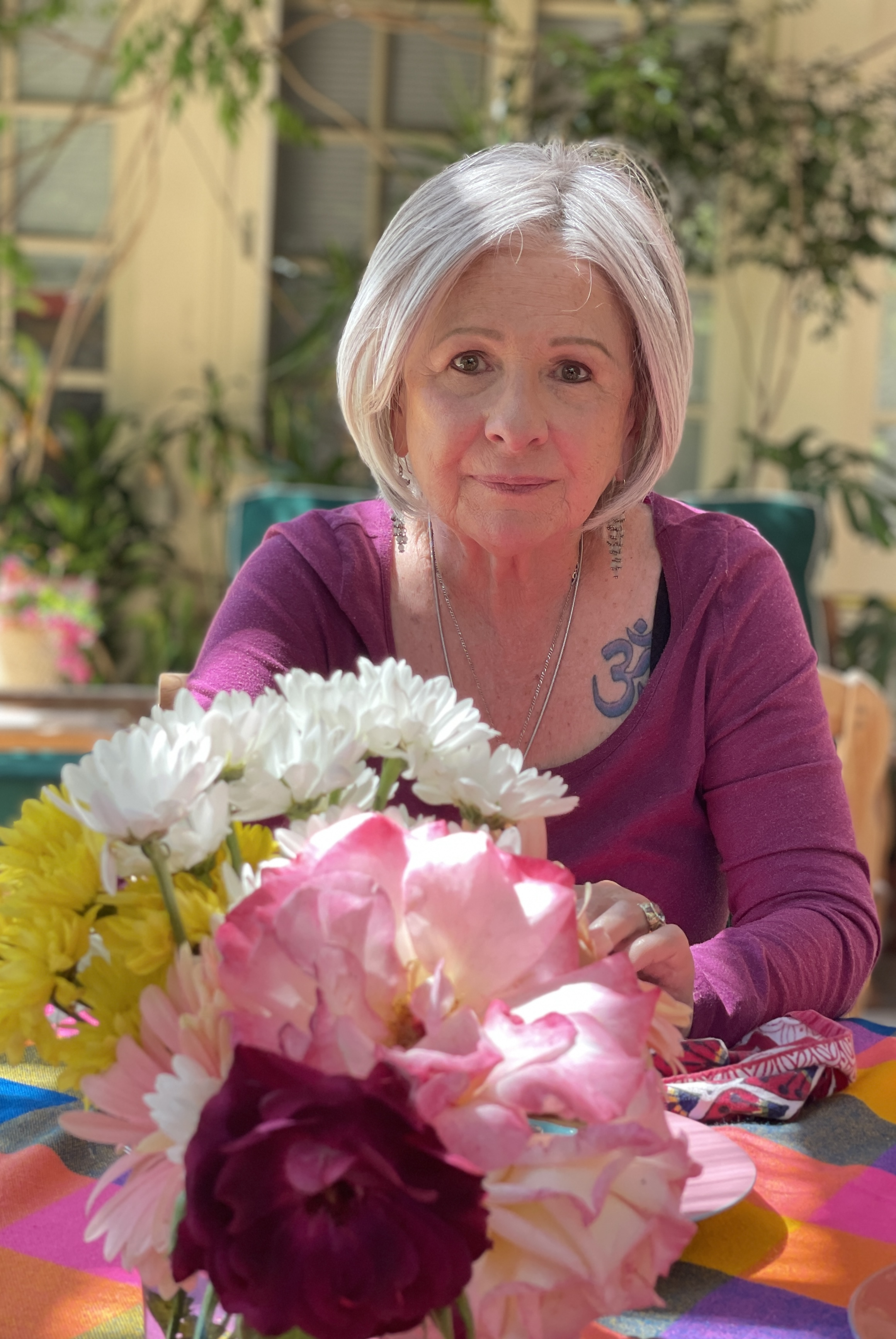
- Born: Montreal, Quebec, Canada
- Years active: 1973–present

Renee C. Missel (born 1947) is a Canadian-born film producer and former photojournalist who has been active since the 1970s. She is a voting member of the Motion Picture Academy, and serves as a judge for the MPAA Nicholl Screenplay competition, MPAA International Oscar Shorts competition, and the UCLA Samuel Goldwyn writing competition.

== Early life and education ==
Missel spent her early years in Montreal, Canada, before moving to California with her family. She attended Antioch University and graduated with a master's degree in psychology in 1984.

== Career ==
Missel began working in photojournalism before transitioning into film production in 1973. She worked briefly as a production assistant for Roger Corman and then as a second assistant director for Fred Weintraub.

She was also a story editor for Sam Goldwyn Jr. and then went on to become story editor at Kings Road Entertainment for Steve Friedman where they developed Slap Shot (1977) and Bloodbrothers (1978).

In 1977, Missel partnered with Howard Rosenman to co-produce the Warner Brothers hit romantic comedy The Main Event (1979), starring Barbra Streisand and Ryan O'Neal. The Main Event (1979) was developed from Missel's original idea about a woman who owns and manages a boxer.

Following the success of The Main Event (1979), Missel and Rosenman signed a deal with Universal Pictures to develop and produce another film based on an original idea of Missel's, Resurrection (1980), starring Ellen Burstyn and Sam Shepard. It explored the themes of consciousness, healing, near-death experience, and basic goodness through the use a female Christ figure. The film garnered two Oscar nominations for Best Actress and Best Supporting Actress (Eva LeGalienne), and one Golden Globe nomination for Best Actress and has become a cult classic.

In 1982, Missel moved to ABC Motion Pictures where she served as Vice President of West Coast Production. While at ABC, she worked on The Flamingo Kid (1984) starring Matt Dillon, and Prizzi's Honor (1985) starring Jack Nicholson. She was also foundation vice president of the Starlight Foundation. She co-produced the 1983 short Meet Mr. Bomb, an anti-nuclear film parodying government nuclear preparation information, which was withdrawn from exhibition after one showing by Laemmle Theatres.

After leaving ABC, she co-wrote My Man Adam (1986) with her then-husband Roger L. Simon; she also produced the film, which starred Veronica Cartwright and Raphael Sbarge. She then joined Dino De Laurentiis and Dino de Laurentiis Cinematografica in 1987 as Head of Production.

She left DDL in 1988 and joined Taylor Hackford's New Visions Pictures to produce the film noir-thriller Defenseless (1991), starring Barbara Hershey and Sam Shepard.

In 1990, Missel rejoined Samuel Goldwyn Jr. and The Samuel Goldwyn Company as Vice President of Production in charge of remakes.

Within a few years, she left The Samuel Goldwyn Company to develop the script for Nell (1994), the motion picture adaptation of Idioglossia. She went on to partner with Jodie Foster in producing Nell (1994), starring Foster and Liam Neeson. The film garnered a 1994 Oscar nomination for Best Actress, as well as three Golden Globe nominations in 1995 for Best Motion Picture — Drama, Best Original Score — Motion Picture (Mark Isham), and Best Performance By An Actress In A Motion Picture (Jodie Foster).

Soon after the success of Nell (1994), Missel went on to Gramercy Pictures to produce Guy (1997) starring Vincent D'Onofrio and Hope Davis. The film depicts a woman who follows a man with a video camera, and deals with themes of intimacy and narcissism. Guy (1997) received critical acclaim at the Venice Film Festival, the Rotterdam Film Festival, and the Miami International Film Festival.

In 1997, Missel became the Artistic Director of the eleven-day Santa Barbara International Film Festival, committing herself to redesigning and positioning the festival to include a host of seminars each year including Oscar nominated screenwriters, directors, producers, and editors. She also inaugurated the popular It Starts With The Script symposium which was moderated each year by Laura Ziskin. During her tenure, honorees included Jodie Foster, Sir Anthony Hopkins, Sean Penn, Anjelika Houston, Ben Kingsley, Whoopi Goldberg, Diane Keaton, Rob Reiner, Julie Christie, John Schesinger, Richard Pryor, and Robert Towne among others. During 1999, her last year as artistic director, the festival hosted over 37,000 attendees.

== Later years ==
In 2006, Missel launched her management company, Renée Missel Management, where she manages European and U.S. talent while developing film projects to produce.
