= Guy (1996 film) =

- Directed by: Michael Lindsay-Hogg
- Written by: Kirby Dick
- Produced by: Renée Missel; Vincent D'Onofrio
- Starring: Hope Davis; Vincent D'Onofrio
- Edited by: Dody Dorn
- Music by: Jeff Beal
- Distributed by: Gramercy Pictures
- Release dates: September 4, 1996 (Venice); December 17, 1997 (United States)
- Running time: 91 minutes
- Country: United States
- Language: English
- Box office: $4,134

Guy is a 1996 American drama film directed by Michael Lindsay-Hogg, produced by Renée Missel and Vincent D'Onofrio, and written by Kirby Dick. It stars Hope Davis, Vincent D'Onofrio, Sandy Martin, Michael Massee, John F. O'Donohue and Richard Portnow. The film had its world premiere at the 53rd Venice International Film Festival in September 1996, and was released theatrically in the United States on December 17, 1997. Its United Kingdom release was on May 22, 1998. It was filmed on location in Los Angeles, California.

== Plot ==
A youthful female filmmaker wants to film the private life of an ordinary person and starts following "Guy". He is irritated about this girl following him and tries to get rid of her, but she does not stop. Eventually he gets used to the girl with the camera and even attempts to become involved with her.
