= PJ Media =

American media company

- Type: Subsidiary
- Industry: Online media
- Founded: 2004
- Founder: Charles Foster Johnson, Roger L. Simon
- Headquarters: United States
- Key people: Aubrey Chernick; Roger L. Simon
- Products: PJ Media, PJTV
- Owner: Salem Media Group
- Website: pjmedia.com

PJ Media, originally known as Pajamas Media, is an American right-wing subscription-based commentary website. It was founded in 2004, with its majority owner being software entrepreneur, billionaire and angel investor Aubrey Chernick, founder of Candle Corporation (acquired by IBM). Salem Media Group acquired the company in March 2019. PJ Media also operated the online television and video network PJTV, which ceased operations on May 11, 2016.

== History ==
PJ Media was founded as Pajamas Media in 2004 by Charles Johnson, the blogger behind Little Green Footballs, and screenwriter and producer Roger L. Simon, after Johnson's contribution to the Killian documents controversy investigation in 2004, in which he helped lead to the retraction of a 60 Minutes story critical of President George W. Bush's service in the Air National Guard and Dan Rather's resignation from CBS News. Johnson and Simon set out to challenge the mainstream media with a network of citizen-journalists. The network was primarily made up of conservatives and libertarians. The network's original name was derived from a dismissive comment made by former CBS news executive Jonathan Klein during the 2004 Killian documents affair: "You couldn't have a starker contrast between the multiple layers of checks and balances at 60 Minutes and a guy sitting in his living room in his pajamas."

Pajamas Media received venture capital funding on 14 November 2005. Pajamas used this funding for its operations and marketing while expanding its news and opinion coverage. Investors in this round of financing included Aubrey Chernick, an angel investor and technology entrepreneur, James Koshland, a venture capitalist, and a partnership formed by DLA Piper Rudnick Gray Cary. It rebranded as Open Source Media shortly thereafter and had a launch party that included a keynote address by former New York Times journalist Judith Miller, presentations from John Podhoretz of Commentary magazine, Andrew Breitbart, Elizabeth Hayt of the New York Times, David Corn of The Nation and others. Less than a week after its official launch Open Source Media changed its name back to Pajamas Media after discovering that Public Radio International distributed a radio show called Open Source produced by Open Source Media, Inc.

Johnson and Pajamas split in 2007 by mutual agreement; Johnson's stake was bought out. In October 2011, Pajamas Media changed its name to PJ Media. In September 2013, former congressman Allen West left PJ Media after he had an altercation with a female staffer and allegedly called her a "Jewish American princess". West denied being fired and said he left voluntarily.

== False claims ==
In August 2018, PJ Media published an article by then supervising editor Paula Bolyard, claiming that Google was manipulating its algorithm to prioritize left-leaning news outlets in their coverage of President Trump. Bolyard acknowledged that her study was "not scientific", although she did conclude that "the results suggest a pattern of bias against right-leaning content." PolitiFact rated this claim as false.

In January 2019, PJ Media published a column by their senior editor Tyler O'Neil in which he insinuated in his article that a Muslim community patrol in New York City might be enforcing Sharia Law and might be linked to the NYPD. This group, the Muslim Community Patrol Service (MCPS) was a certified volunteer Neighborhood watch in Brooklyn, a NYC CERT along with other community patrols such as the Brooklyn Asian Safety Patrol and the Guardian Angels. PJ Media offered nothing that demonstrated the MCPS could, or planned to, "enforce Sharia law", beyond engaging in the speculative hypothetical that the MCPS might somehow "apply [...] Sharia in its community monitoring." Snopes rated this claim false.

In February 2019, PJ Media published a column by one of their writers John Hawkins, also creator of Rightwingnews, in which he stated in an article titled "The Six Most Bizarre Proposals from Alexandria Ocasio-Cortez's Green New Deal", making five out of six claims such as "getting rid of airplanes" or "getting rid of cows", aim to "get rid of gas-powered cars in a decade", call for eliminating carbon emissions in ten years "without the use of nuclear power", or "promise 'economic security' for those 'unwilling to work'". Fact checkers from NewsGuard rated these five claims false, which can be further verified by the official government resolution H.Res.109 Green New Deal proposed by Congresswoman Alexandria Ocasio-Cortez.

In January 2020, PJ Media published a column by one of their writers, Robert Spencer, also founder and director of the anti-Muslim conspiracy blog Jihad Watch, in which he stated that congresswoman Ilhan Omar had given Iran military advice by suggesting it could target Trump hotels, and thus committed treason. Snopes rated this claim false.

In February 2020, PJ Media published a column by Victoria Taft, one of their writers and a conservative talk show host, in which she stated that President Barack Obama waited until millions were infected and 1000 dead in the U.S. before he declared the Pandemic H1N1/09 virus an emergency. Snopes rated this claim false.

According to NewsGuard, articles on PJMedia.com have frequently included distorted or misleading claims, including about the COVID-19 pandemic. A now deleted July 2020 article written by Matt Margolis headlined "COVID-19 May Soon Lose Status as an 'Epidemic' Under CDC Guidelines", promoted a misleading claim originally published by JustTheNews.com. Many other websites reported this story by PJ Media. After the fact, PJ Media never issued a correction to their original story, but only an update with changes and a new headline "COVID-19 Will Not Soon Lose Status as an 'Epidemic' Under the CDC".

In August, 2020, PJ Media published an article by their Chicago editor Rick Moran, claiming Democrats were urging presidential candidate Joe Biden not to debate with President Trump because they were concerned with the former vice president's mental stamina. The source for this claim cited on the PJ Media article was from Newsweek, but the article states that the former vice president was advised not to debate Trump, citing "publicity stunts and disregard for the rules in 2016" as well as cancelling debates over concerns of the COVID-19 pandemic. Furthermore, the Newsweek article cited by PJ Media makes no mention about any mental stamina. According to CNN, Biden spokesman TJ Ducklo stated that presidential candidate Biden has already agreed to three debates with President Trump in fall 2020.

In September 2020, PJ Media published an article by senior editor Tyler O'Neil, claiming that Democratic presidential candidate Joe Biden was promising fewer fires, floods, and hurricanes if he should defeat Donald Trump in November. Though Biden did promise he would solve the climate crisis if elected in November, he did not literally promise fewer catastrophic events. Fact checkers at Snopes rated this claim as false.

In September 2022, PJ Media blogger Matt Margolis was the originator of a claim made in a PJ Media article that “The Obama Foundation stored classified documents in an abandoned furniture warehouse. Snopes called this out as a false claim as both classified and unclassified records from the Obama presidency were temporarily located in Hoffman Estates, a suburb of Chicago, in a building that used to be an old furniture store. However, while the Obama Foundation provided funds to move and store those records, it had neither possession nor control of them, given that they were in the custody of the National Archives and Records Administration (NARA) from the day Obama left office. What the PJ Media article failed to mention is that this was an agreement in which the foundation provided funds to move documents, but did not state that the foundation had control or access to those documents. After further research and scrutiny from other fact-checkers such as USA Today, PJ Media later admitted they made a false claim.

== PJTV ==
In the summer of 2008, Pajamas Media launched PJTV, a subscription based internet television service. The Internet television service debuted at the 2008 Republican National Convention in St. Paul, Minnesota. PJTV featured shows hosted by commentators such as Bill Whittle, Tammy Bruce, and Glenn Reynolds.

On May 11, 2016, PJTV shut down operations after its majority investor Aubrey Chernick pulled out funds.
