= Bill Whittle =

American conservative political commentator and YouTuber

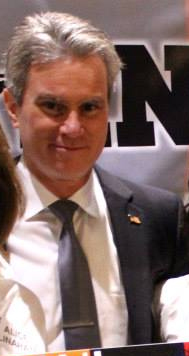
- Whittle in 2014
- Born: April 7, 1959 (age 67); New York City, U.S.
- Education: University of Florida
- Occupations: Author; director; screenwriter; editor; internet personality; blogger
- Website: billwhittle.com

William Alfred Whittle (born April 7, 1959) is an American conservative political commentator and YouTuber. He has made videos for PJ Media as the presenter of Afterburner, The Firewall, The Daily Wire, and as co-host of Right Angle with Stephen Green and Scott Ott, his former fellow co-hosts of Trifecta. Whittle has also produced videos and writing for other outlets, such as the NRA and Truth Revolt.

He is a former National Review Online contributor and has been a guest on the Fox News Channel, The Dennis Miller Show, Sun TV, and national radio programs. His first book, Silent America: Essays from a Democracy at War, was published in 2004. Since 2009, Whittle has been a featured speaker at universities and a number of Republican and Tea Party events throughout the United States. He is also the co-founder of the independent film studio Declaration Entertainment, and is a narrator for Encounter Books.

== Early life ==
Whittle was born in New York City to William Joseph Whittle, a hotel manager. He is the oldest of four children. Whittle spent his youth in Bermuda, where he attended Warwick Academy and Saltus Grammar School, and later moved with his family to South Florida in the early 1970s. At age 13, he began working at the Miami Space Transit Planetarium and was made a console operator by its director Jack Horkheimer after a few months. As a teenager he wrote and directed the planetarium's light shows.

He had intended to become a test pilot for the United States Air Force. At age 17, he applied to the U.S. Air Force Academy, but was rejected due to a failed preliminary medical eye examination. He developed an interest in filmmaking while helping friends make Super 8 short films and formed a short-lived studio, Mindfire Films, Inc., in the late 1970s. He named Mike Jittlov's The Wizard of Speed and Time as one of his early influences. In 1979, Whittle began attending the University of Florida as a theater major. While there, he wrote and directed the short film The Pigeon Hole which became a national finalist in the Student Academy Awards competition. Whittle did not maintain the required grade point average and dropped out of college after losing his financial aid. In the summer of 1983, Whittle was part of a volunteer company of actors, directors and set designers which put on stage performances to sponsor a fundraiser for the Boca Raton Hotel's Caldwell Playhouse.

== Career ==
After leaving the University of Florida, Whittle moved to Los Angeles where he worked various jobs. He started working as a freelance film editor during the late-1980s and 1990s on television series and specials for The Discovery Channel, The History Channel, and NBC.

Whittle briefly ran a video editing company during this period which closed down in 1998. He continued working in the TV industry as an editor on the Turner Classic Movies special Movie Monsters Revealed (1999), House Calls (2000), Ed McMahon's Next Big Star (2002), Movie Obsessions (2002), AMC's Sunday Morning Shoot-Out (2007–2008), and Shatner's Raw Nerve (2008).

On July 4, 2010, Whittle announced the creation of Declaration Entertainment, an independent film studio, which used crowdsourcing to finance its projects. Co-founded with Jeremy Boreing, the two had guest hosted for Larry O'Connor's BlogTalkRadio podcast The Stage Right Show earlier that year. Its first feature film, The Arroyo, completed filming in August 2012, and is awaiting an official release date.

On January 31, 2017, Whittle began writing for The Daily Wire. Also in January 2017, Whittle began producing video content for the National Rifle Association's NRATV network. Whittle's show for the NRA, titled Hot Mic, was a critique of "left-wing pop culture's war on our freedom and rights".

On July 11, 2019, Whittle announced that he would host a four-part podcast about the Apollo 11 Moon landing, titled Apollo 11: What We Saw. The first episode aired on July 13, 2019 and the second aired on July 15, 2019. In March 2023, he released a second season of What We Saw about the Cold War, entitled The Cold War: What We Saw. In March 2024, he released a third season of What We Saw about the Russian Revolution and the history of the Soviet Union, entitled An Empire of Terror: What We Saw.

In July 2021, he released a history-focused podcast through The Daily Wire called America's Forgotten Heroes.

== Blogging ==
=== EjectEjectEject.com ===
In December 2002, Whittle started his first blog, Eject! Eject! Eject!, writing personal narratives and long format essays which discussed current events and political philosophy. He was inspired to start writing following the death of his father earlier that year. He soon developed friendships with fellow bloggers Frank J. Fleming, James Lileks, and P. J. O'Rourke who praised his unique writing style. Whittle has credited O'Rourke, in particular, for "bringing me home to conservatism". Initially, much of the blog's content was focused on Whittle's support for the Iraq War. In 2004, a collection of his essays was published in Silent America: A Democracy at War. They were also quoted in several newspapers across the country.

Six years after starting Eject! Eject! Eject!, Whittle began writing as a guest columnist for the National Review Online. Both his original essays and National Review columns have been cited by authors William DeMersseman, Jim Geraghty, and Frank Miniter. Crime fiction author Robert Ferrigno used an excerpt from Whittle's essay "The Undefended City" for the introduction of his 2009 novel Heart of the Assassin.

=== PJ Media ===
In December 2008, Whittle moved to PJ Media where he continued blogging and hosted several of its video segments:

- Afterburner (2009–): A weekly three-minute editorial challenging conventional wisdom about politics and society from a conservative perspective.
- Trifecta (2009–2016): A weekly program, co-hosted with Stephen Green and Scott Ott, which offers political commentary on current events.
- The Firewall (2010–): A series of independently produced video essays based on his early political writing.
- Klavan & Whittle (2011–): A Q&A video series with Whittle and author Andrew Klavan discussing various political and social topics.

His first Afterburner segment was broadcast on May 7, 2009, as a rebuttal to Jon Stewart's assertion on The Daily Show that the atomic bombing of Japan in World War II was a war crime. A June 2009 essay entitled "The Michael Jackson Effect" was criticized by the Toronto Star for Whittle's suggestion that the federal government used the coverage of Michael Jackson's death to push through cap-and-trade legislation. In October 2010, Joe Newby of the Spokane Examiner called his "What We Believe" series "a must-see for anyone who does not understand what the Tea Party is all about". In February 2011, Laura Baxley of the Atlanta Examiner wrote that Whittle's "The Narrative" was "a brilliant discourse on this Marxist underpinning of critical theory".

Whittle's video "Eat the Rich", presenting his position on the consequences of high taxation on the wealthy, was played on Glenn Beck's radio talk show in April 2011. He was also on The Rusty Humphries Show that month and has filled in as a guest host for Rusty Humphries multiple times since his first appearance. His politically themed videos have been released via YouTube through PJ Media and Real Clear Politics.

Later that year, Whittle was hired by Encounter Books to narrate a series of animated "whiteboard" videos featured on TheBlaze. In November 2011, the Spokane Examiner reviewed one of these videos, based on the 2010 book "The World Turned Upside Down: The Global Battle over God, Truth, and Power" by Melanie Phillips, which purported to present the reasoning behind Communist, Islamist and Neo-Nazi support of the Occupy Wall Street protests. The newspaper complimented the video stating that it "ties the groups together rather nicely".

In his role as a commentator for PJTV, Whittle interviewed personalities including Ed Klein, Ayn Rand Institute fellow Don Watkins, Oath Keepers founder Stewart Rhodes, Andrew Card, David Frum, Lord Monckton, Investor's Business Daily editor Terry Jones, Tim Cavanaugh, and Arizona Governor Jan Brewer. Other PJTV segments featuring Whittle included:

- Finding Common Ground (2009): A panelist show filmed at CPAC 2009: Conservatism 2.0 with guests Glenn Reynolds, John Avlon, Scott Ott, Alonzo Rachel, and moderated by Whittle. He also conducted interviews with Amil Amani and Nonie Darwish, founders of Former Muslims United, and activist Wafa Sultan at CPAC 2010.
- LunarPalooza (2009): A 3-part video series celebrating the 40th-anniversary of the 1969 Moon landing.
- The Islamic Infiltration (2010): A 3-part investigative report examining the influence of Islamic extremism in the federal government and accessibility to classified information as claimed by two anonymous whistleblowers.
- PJ Pop Quiz (2012): A light-hearted quiz show which has occasionally featured Whittle and other PJTV personalities.
- Election Hot Seat (2012): Official coverage of the 2012 United States presidential election.

Whittle was friends with Andrew Breitbart.

=== The Stratosphere Lounge ===
In May 2012, Whittle started his own weekly podcast, "The Stratosphere Lounge", in which Whittle takes questions from his Facebook followers. It airs live on Thursday evenings via Twitch and is later uploaded on his official YouTube channel. The show is still running and episodes typically last between 1 and 2 hours.

=== Public speaking ===
Whittle is a frequent guest speaker at political rallies and other public events.

Whittle's appearance at the Orange County Republicans' annual Flag Day dinner in June 2011 inadvertently found him opposing co-speaker New Mexico Governor Susana Martinez who advocated that California Republicans should be focusing its efforts on winning over Hispanic-American voters.

== Personal life ==
Whittle is married to Russian photographer Natasha Melnikova.

=== Aviation ===
Whittle is an instrument-rated pilot of glider and light aircraft. He studied aviation as a teenager with the intention of entering the U.S. Air Force Academy. Author and screenwriter Michael Walsh, in his 2009 novel Hostile Intent, credited Whittle for teaching him the OODA loop.

On July 9, 2005, Whittle was involved in an incident while attempting to land at Visalia Municipal Airport when the front landing gear failed. The airport's runway was closed for an hour; however, neither Whittle nor the other passenger was injured. Whittle has described similar incidents in his flying career.

== Filmography ==
=== Editor ===
Year	Title	Role	Notes
1999	Movie Monsters Revealed	Editor	Also camera operator
2000	House Calls	Editor	
2002	Ed McMahon's Next Big Star	Editor	
2002	Movie Obsessions	Editor	
2007–2008	Sunday Morning Shoot-Out	Editor	
2008	Shatner's Raw Nerve	Editor	

=== Himself ===
Year	Film	Role	Notes
2011–2012	Red Eye	Himself	Episode: "March 15, 2012"; Episode: "June 4, 2011"
2012	PolitiChicks	Himself	
2019–present	What We Saw	Himself	
