= Enemies, A Love Story (film) =

1989 film by Paul Mazursky

- original film poster
- Directed by: Paul Mazursky
- Screenplay by: Roger L. Simon; Paul Mazursky
- Based on: Enemies, A Love Story by Isaac Bashevis Singer
- Produced by: Paul Mazursky
- Starring: Anjelica Huston; Ron Silver; Lena Olin; Margaret Sophie Stein; Alan King
- Cinematography: Fred Murphy
- Edited by: Stuart H. Pappé
- Music by: Maurice Jarre
- Production company: Morgan Creek Productions
- Distributed by: 20th Century Fox
- Release date: December 13, 1989
- Running time: 119 minutes
- Country: United States
- Language: English
- Budget: $9.5 million
- Box office: $16 million

Enemies, A Love Story is a 1989 American romantic tragicomedy film directed by Paul Mazursky, based on the 1966 novel Enemies, A Love Story (Yiddish: Sonim, di geshikhte fun a libe) by Isaac Bashevis Singer. The film stars Ron Silver, Anjelica Huston, Lena Olin and Margaret Sophie Stein. The film received positive reviews from critics and three nominations at the 62nd Academy Awards: Best Supporting Actress (for Huston and Olin) and Best Adapted Screenplay.

== Plot ==
In 1949, guilt-ridden Holocaust survivor Herman Broder lives in New York with his wife Yadwiga. During the war, Yadwiga (then the Broders' gentile servant) saved Herman's life by hiding him in a hayloft. Believing his wife, Tamara, to have perished in a concentration camp, Herman took Yadwiga with him as his wife when he emigrated to the United States. He tells her that he works as a traveling book-salesman; however, in reality, he is a ghost writer for the avaricious Rabbi Lembeck. He also is having an affair with Masha, whose own experiences in a concentration camp have left her embittered about God and Judaism; she emigrated to New York with her mother and married Leon, an older man from whom she is estranged. Masha wants them to divorce their respective spouses and get married, but he continually puts her off.

After answering an ad in the newspaper, Herman is shocked to learn that Tamara not only survived the Holocaust, but has come to New York to be with him. Herman confesses to her both his current marriage and affair. Accepting that he has moved on from her emotionally, Tamara agrees not to pursue her claim as his wife and befriends him. In short order, both Masha and Yadwiga announce each is pregnant. Masha procures a divorce from Leon, who warns Herman that Masha is manipulative. After she swears on her own life that Leon is lying about her, Masha and Herman find a Rabbi to perform the ceremony without asking questions. Herman now has three wives.

Masha experiences internal bleeding, and the attending physician tells Herman that she was never pregnant. Rabbi Lembeck, having met Masha, invites the couple to a party. There, the wealthy Nathan Pescheles - who happened to meet all three wives by chance - reveals Herman's polygamy to the assembled crowd. Feeling angry and betrayed, Masha leaves Herman. He becomes more religious to help Yadwiga convert to Judaism. Tamara helps him by getting him a job with a rabbi.

A few weeks later, Masha calls Herman, hoping to convince him to bolt to Florida or California with her. Admitting to Tamara that Masha's pull on him is too great but promising to support his unborn child, Herman leaves Yadwiga for good. But before they can leave, Masha's mother dies. Unable to pay for the funeral but realizing she can't bear the thought of not being buried next to her mother, Masha asks Herman to commit suicide with her. Herman agrees, but when they realize neither has ever been completely truthful with the other, he leaves. Masha takes a lethal overdose of sleeping pills.

Rabbi Lembeck pays for Masha and her mother's funeral and takes care of the hospital fees for Yadwiga. Tamara and Yadwiga raise the child, named Masha, together. Letters occasionally arrive containing only money to help care for the child.

== Cast ==
- Ron Silver as Herman Broder
- Anjelica Huston as Tamara Luria-Broder
- Lena Olin as Masha Bloch-Tortshiner
- Margaret Sophie Stein as Yadwiga, Herman's maid
- Alan King as Rabbi Lembeck
- Judith Malina as Shifra Puah Bloch, Masha's mother
- Elya Baskin as Yasha Kobik
- Paul Mazursky as Leon Tortshiner, Masha's husband
- Phil Leeds as Pesheles
- Rita Karin as Mrs. Schreier
- Zypora Spaisman as Sheva Haddas

== Reception ==
Enemies, A Love Story holds a rating of 89% on Rotten Tomatoes based on 27 reviews. The consensus states: "Enemies, A Love Story finds writer-director Paul Mazursky operating near peak form, weaving a richly melodramatic tapestry brought to life by a stellar cast."

=== Awards ===
- The film was nominated for three Academy Awards, including two nominations in the Best Supporting Actress category for Anjelica Huston and Lena Olin and a nomination for Best Adapted Screenplay for Roger L. Simon and Paul Mazursky.

== See also ==
- List of Holocaust films
