= Scenes from a Mall =

1991 film by Paul Mazursky

- Theatrical release poster
- Directed by: Paul Mazursky
- Written by: Roger L. Simon; Paul Mazursky
- Produced by: Paul Mazursky
- Starring: Bette Midler; Woody Allen
- Cinematography: Fred Murphy
- Edited by: Stuart H. Pappé
- Music by: Marc Shaiman
- Production companies: Touchstone Pictures; Silver Screen Partners IV
- Distributed by: Buena Vista Pictures Distribution
- Release date: February 22, 1991
- Running time: 87 minutes
- Country: United States
- Language: English
- Budget: $3 million
- Box office: $19 million

Scenes from a Mall is a 1991 American comedy film directed by Paul Mazursky, written by Mazursky and Roger L. Simon, and starring Bette Midler and Woody Allen. The title is a play on Ingmar Bergman's Scenes from a Marriage, and the film itself features similar themes of marital disintegration. The film is Woody Allen's first film since The Front in which he did not write or direct.

The film received mostly negative reviews, with critics focusing on the characters' arbitrary and unrealistic emotional reactions, lack of successful humor and overdone production. It grossed $19 million against a $3 million budget.

== Plot ==
Nick, a sports lawyer, is married to psychotherapist and author Deborah. After years of being happily married, Nick reveals to Deborah that he has had an affair. She is soon shocked and requests a divorce, but later admits that she herself has been unfaithful.

== Cast ==
- Bette Midler as Deborah Fifer
- Woody Allen as Nick Fifer
- Bill Irwin as Mime
- Daren Firestone as Sam
- Rebecca Nickels as Jennifer
- Paul Mazursky as Doctor Hans Clava
- Marc Shaiman as Pianist
- Fabio Lanzoni as Handsome Man

== Production ==
Most of the mall scenes were filmed at the Kaufman Astoria Studios sound stages in Queens, New York. Mall scenes with elevators and escalators were filmed at the Stamford Town Center in Stamford, Connecticut. Mall exteriors were filmed at the Beverly Center in Los Angeles, California, the mall where most of the picture is set.

== Reception ==
The film received generally negative reviews. On Rotten Tomatoes it has an approval rating of 32% based on reviews from 25 critics. Audiences polled by CinemaScore gave the film an average grade of "C−" on an A+ to F scale.

At the time of its release, film critics almost unanimously commented that the characters' emotional responses were contrived and false, and that the gaudy set design and production seemed an obvious effort to hide the film's lack of both comedic value and dramatic substance. Roger Ebert summarized the story as "a fog of arbitrary storytelling and desperate gimmicks, sudden revelations and unmotivated mood swings, in a movie that seems to have been written without having been thought about very much." On their television show, Ebert's colleague Gene Siskel called the film "stunningly unfunny," saying he "didn't laugh once when they were inside the mall, and that's incredible for a film with these two stars." Siskel also wondered if Allen's paycheck was the sole reason for his appearance in the film.

The Los Angeles Times' Peter Rainder opined that "the pairing of Allen and Midler, which might seem like the kind of weirdo match-up that could produce a comedy classic, never takes flight. ... Allen and Midler are such highly individual actors that they never quite seem to be in the same orbit; the series of juicy marital revelations that keep perking the movie come across as forced and schematic because we never really believe in the relationship." Variety similarly said that the characters' "emotional storms never achieve any veracity. They seem like just another indulgence on the part of the pampered, secure spouses."

Many critics found the film's awfulness to be especially startling in light of its esteemed director and lead actors. Time Out, for example, said it "comes over as a piss-take of Mazursky by Mazursky." However, most commented that Allen and Midler's performances were not to blame, as there was simply no way to play the characters that would have made them likable or believable. Vincent Canby of The New York Times, one of the few to give the film a positive recommendation, instead argued that Allen and Midler saved the thin and unstructured script: "Little by little, though, the stars take over their characters. They play together with a straight-on honesty that is funny because of the oddball situations, and moving for the unexpected, easy legitimacy of the performances."

Scenes from a Mall was amongst Siskel & Ebert's worst movies of 1991. Gene Siskel, who chose the film for the list with Ebert approving the choice, remarked, "Bette Midler and Woody Allen in the same film as a married couple? Well, the very idea of that is funnier than anything in the movie!"

== Box office ==
The film was not a box office success, it grossed $9.6 million and $19 million worldwide.
