= My Man Adam =

1986 film by Roger L. Simon

- VHS cover
- Directed by: Roger L. Simon
- Written by: Roger L. Simon and Renée Missel
- Produced by: Paul Aratow; Renée Missel; Thom Mount; Gail Stayden; Martin Stayden
- Starring: Raphael Sbarge; Page Hannah; Veronica Cartwright
- Cinematography: Donald McAlpine
- Edited by: Don Zimmerman
- Music by: Sylvester Levay
- Production company: The Mount Company
- Distributed by: Tri-Star Pictures
- Release date: October 25, 1985
- Running time: 84 minutes
- Country: United States
- Language: English
- Box office: $92,920 (USA)

My Man Adam is a 1985 American comedy film directed by Roger L. Simon and co-written by Simon and Renée Missel.

== Plot ==
High schooler Adam Swit constantly daydreams about the same beautiful girl. Soon new student Sabrina McKay shows up who's identical to the girl of his dreams. Struggling to win her over, he doesn't do so well until a complex conspiracy throws them both into potential peril.

== Principal cast ==
- Raphael Sbarge as Adam Swit
- Page Hannah as Sabrina McKay
- Veronica Cartwright as Elaine Swit
- Larry B. Scott as Donald
- Dave Thomas as Jerry Swit
- Austin Pendleton as Mr. Greenhut
- Chris Elliott as Mr. Spooner
- Gary Hershberger as Stan
- Jeffrey Mylett as Phillip
- Charlie Barnett as Leroy
