= 2006 Lebanon War photographs controversies =

The 2006 Lebanon War photographs controversies (also referred to as "Hizbollywood" or "Hezbollywood") refers to instances of photojournalism from the 2006 Lebanon War that misrepresented scenes of death and destruction in Lebanon caused by Israeli air attacks.

CAMERA, a media watch organization, said that the photographic manipulations were used by the mainstream media in an attempt to sway public opinion and paint Israel as an aggressor, and suggesting that Israel was guilty of targeting civilians.

== Photo manipulation ==
Adnan's digitally manipulated photograph of the aftermath of an IDF attack on Beirut.

Before and after image manipulation

Digitally manipulated photograph of an IAF F-16 deploying a single flare over Southern Lebanon; the flare was digitally duplicated to make it appear that several missiles were being fired.

The Adnan Hajj photographs controversy (also called Reutersgate) involves digitally manipulated photographs taken by Adnan Hajj, a Lebanese freelance photographer based in the Middle East, who had worked for Reuters over a period of more than ten years. He admitted to using Photoshop to add and darken smoke spirals in a photograph of Beirut, in order to make the damage appear worse. Hajj's photographs were presented as part of Reuters' news coverage of the 2006 Lebanon War, but Reuters has admitted that at least two were significantly altered before being published. Reuters stated that Hajj had edited a second photo, cloning a flare on a picture of an Israeli F16 and falsely claiming they were three air-to-ground missiles, and critics raised further questions about Hajj's work.

The first image was discovered on August 5, 2006 when blogger Charles Johnson of Little Green Footballs wrote that the first image "shows blatant evidence of manipulation" (Adobe Photoshop clone stamp), Reuters removed all of Hajj's photographs from their site; Hajj claimed to not have intentionally altered the photo but was trying to remove "dust marks". Reuters did not stand by the photographer and admitted that Hajj had altered it, saying "photo editing software was improperly used on this image. A corrected version will immediately follow this advisory. We are sorry for any inconvenience." Head of PR Moira Whittle said: "Reuters takes such matters extremely seriously as it is strictly against company editorial policy to alter pictures."

The second manipulated image was reported by the pseudonymous blogger "Dr. Rusty Shackleford" on his blog "The Jawa Report". Reuters captioned it as showing an Israeli F-16 fighter jet firing ground-attack missiles "during an air strike on Nabatiyeh", but the F-16 was actually deploying one defensive flare, and the original photograph showed only one flare. The photo had been doctored to increase the number of flares falling from the F-16 from one to three, and misidentified them as missiles.

On August 6, Reuters announced it would stop all cooperation with Adnan Hajj. Hajj claimed he had just been trying to remove dust marks, and that he made mistakes due to the bad lighting conditions he was working under. Critics point out that this is impossible, as Hajj's doctored image added an entire plume of smoke, duplicated several buildings, and showed a repeating pattern indicating that one plume of smoke was "cloned" several times.

On August 7, Reuters decided to withdraw all 920 photos by Hajj from sale. On January 18, 2007 Reuters reported that an internal investigation into the Adnan Hajj photomanipulation had led to a top Reuters photo editor being fired. As of May 11, 2008, Reuters had removed all of Hajj's images from its site.

== Allegations of staging by press photographers ==
A photo of a burning Qur'an amid a pile of rubble, also taken by Hajj, seemed suspicious to Los Angeles Times media critic Tim Rutten, since the building it was in had been destroyed in an Israeli airstrike hours beforehand, and everything else in the photo was already ash. A number of photographs were taken from Lebanon showing various children's toys in the foreground, each surrounded by a pile of rubble. Rutten also wrote about this set, saying that "Reuters might want to check its freelancers' expenses for unexplained Toys R Us purchases."

Similarly, CAMERA questioned the authenticity of seemingly pristine photographs and photo albums lying on the top of the rubble of buildings destroyed by Israeli missiles, asking "how often does one find intact photographs sitting alone and undisturbed on top of the ruins of a building levelled by a missile? But coincidentally or not, photographers from various news organizations have been finding just that in rubble all over Lebanon" ... "with the only common denominator that all purport to depict Israel's destruction of Lebanese civilian life".

== Allegations of photo staging by others ==
Salam Daher, the head of the South Lebanon civil defense organisation, was accused by bloggers and websites of being a Hezbollah member and of using the bodies of children for propaganda purposes in photographs taken at the scene of the 2006 Qana airstrike.

On 8 August, CNN anchor Anderson Cooper reported about a Hezbollah press tour of a bombed-out area in southern Beirut on 23 July 2006, during which Hezbollah operatives asked a group of empty ambulances to switch on their sirens and flashing lights for the benefit of the waiting press photographers, to give the impression that they were responding to casualties. Senior Producer Charlie Moore described the same tour as a "dog-and-pony show".

The same day, Richard Landes and The Wall Street Journal editorial writer James Taranto challenged the validity of a photograph taken by Associated Press worker Lefteris Pitarakis. The picture in question depicted several Lebanese residents who were reportedly killed in an Israeli air strike. Upon close examination of a single still image, Taranto concluded that one man in particular was pretending to be dead.

"Plainly this scene was staged for the benefit of the cameras, though it is important to note we know of no evidence that the photographer was complicit in the staging. It is, however, a clear example of how terrorist groups use journalists to spread their propaganda."

A cursory examination of several other stills in the photographic sequence established that the man first assumed to be feigning his own death was in fact dead. Consequently, both Richard Landes and James Taranto acknowledged they were "mistaken."

== Ambulance controversy ==
After the International Committee of the Red Cross issued a statement saying that "two of its ambulances were struck by [Israeli] munitions, although both vehicles were clearly marked" on 23 July 2006, wounding nine people, the Associated Press reported that "Israeli jets blasted two ambulances with rockets" according to "Ali Deebe, a Red Cross spokesman in Tyre". The Boston Globe quoted Kasim Shaalan as saying "A big fire came toward me, like in a dream" after a "rocket or missile had made a direct hit through the roof".

A controversy developed when "zombie", the pseudonymous owner of the zombietime website, posted a long essay arguing (among other things) that the damage to the ambulance was far too light for a missile strike. Zombie said that the ambulance was rusted out in the photographs, that explosive damage would not have left a rusted-out shell, and that the photos showed no blast damage but instead a perfectly round hole that coincided precisely with where the roof vent would be, and was on other ambulances.

In December 2006, Human Rights Watch released a report on forensic investigations they conducted in Qana. The group concluded that there was no hoax. HRW had "originally reported that the ambulances had been struck by missiles fired from an Israeli airplane, but that conclusion was incorrect". The December 2006 report speculated that the ambulances were hit by a "smaller type of missile", possibly a "SPIKE anti-armor missile" or "the still experimental DIME (dense inert metal explosive) missile." Both missiles have a relatively small blast radius, with DIME being specifically designed to limit collateral damage.

Professor Avi Bell, a reservist in the Israel Defense Forces, criticized the Human Rights Watch report, writing that "the report contains no evidence whatsoever of any other Israeli presence in the area that could have attacked the ambulances. ... The report presents nothing more than its conjecture that Israel possesses and used unspecified new 'limited impact missiles designed to cause low collateral damage' fired from drones. ... Human Rights Watch assumes Israeli guilt without proof, viewing its mission as constructing a scenario, however implausible, in which it might be right."

== Allegations of improper captioning ==
Photographs submitted to Reuters and Associated Press showed a Lebanese woman mourning in front of destroyed buildings, said to be her home, on two different pictures taken by two photographers, published and captioned two weeks apart, which BBC editors replaced on their website after comments pointing to the inconsistency. Guardian features writer Patrick Barkham offered the following explanation for other reported time-stamp inconsistencies between different news agencies:

[B]loggers in Britain and the US want to prove that the mainstream media are swallowing Hizbullah propaganda. [...] At first, they suggested victims of the Israeli bombings were being carried around and posed for pictures because of different time-stamps on photographs reproduced on news websites. An AP photo was time-stamped 7.21 am, showing a dead girl in an ambulance. Another AP picture by a different photographer, stamped 10.25 am, showed the same girl being loaded on to the ambulance. A third, with the time 10.44 am, showed a rescue worker carrying the girl with no ambulance nearby. Three agencies – AP, AFP and Reuters – denied staging pictures at Qana. And the explanation for the different times was simple. Different news websites, such as Yahoo, put their own time-stamps on photos they receive from feeds; and AP does not distribute photos sequentially but on their news value and how quickly they are sent in.

The New York Times improperly captioned a photo taken in the city of Tyre in its online edition; an injured rescue worker being lifted from the rubble was implied to have been a bombing victim when in fact the worker had slipped and fallen. The newspaper subsequently issued a correction, saying that the photo had appeared in the printed edition with the correct caption.

=== Bruno Stevens photos ===
A set of photos taken by press photographer Bruno Stevens show a Lebanese gunman with a raging fire in the background. One such photo appeared on the cover of the 31 July issue of U.S. News & World Report, with the inside caption, "Hezbollah guerilla poses at the site of an Israeli attack near Beirut". Another one was published in the 31 July issue of Time, with a caption saying the fire came from the "wreckage of a downed Israeli jet." Michelle Malkin and anonymous blogger Allahpundit stated that the fire in the background appeared to be a large pile of burning tires.

On 11 November 2006 Stevens, on the online forum "Lightstalkers", gave his explanation for the discrepancy. He wrote that he had originally given one of the photos the following caption:

"Kfar Chima, near Beirut, 17 July 2006 An Israeli Air Force F16 has allegedly been shot down while bombing a group of Hezbollah owned trucks, at least one of these trucks contained a medium range ground to ground missile launcher."

He wrote that sometime later, after having done more investigation, he had modified his caption to:

"Kfar Chima, near Beirut, 17 July 2006 The Israeli Air Force bombed a group of Hezbollah chartered trucks parked on the back of large Lebanese Army barracks, at least one of these trucks contained a medium range ground to ground missile launcher, at least one missile was hit, misfiring high into the sky before falling down and starting a huge fire in the barracks' parking lot."

In his post, he wrote that he had had no say in the magazines' captions. He also reaffirmed the validity of his second caption, stating that the fire did not come from a garbage dump and was indeed the result of an Israeli attack; though he considered the site "a very legitimate target for the Israeli Air Force."

== See also ==
- Arab–Israeli conflict
- Battle of Jenin (2002)
- Journalistic fraud
- Journalism scandals
- Media coverage of the Arab–Israeli conflict
- Muhammad al-Durrah controversy
- Pallywood
- Photo manipulation
