= Salam Daher =

Lebanese civil defense worker

Salam Daher (Arabic: سلام ضاهر, born 1967) is a Lebanese civil defense worker who was involved in the aftermath of the Israeli airstrike on Qana on July 30, 2006, where widely published photographs showed him removing dead children from the rubble of a house struck by an Israeli attack.

== Background ==
Daher was born in 1967 in the predominantly Christian south Lebanese town of Marjayoun and began working as a civil defense volunteer at the age of 12. In 1986, during the 1982-2000 South Lebanon conflict and Lebanese civil war of 1975–1990, he joined the civil defense service of the Lebanese interior ministry as an apprentice and worked his way up the ranks. His home town was at the centre of the 1982-2000 conflict, being the headquarters of the pro-Israeli South Lebanon Army militia, and was repeatedly attacked by Palestinian militias during the civil war and subsequently by the Hezbollah militia during Israel's occupation of southern Lebanon. He moved to the coastal city of Tyre in 1996, where the influence of Hezbollah is far weaker (the city is run by Hezbollah's secular rival Amal. By the time of the 2006 Israel-Lebanon conflict, he was working as the head of civil defense operations for Tyre and the surrounding region, including Qana.

He has described himself as a first responder, "often the one who takes the phone call alerting the civil defense to an emergency, and he is often part of the first team to reach the site." According to the Associated Press, which interviewed him, "when bombs strike, he races his ambulance along narrow country roads, digs through rubble and tries to save the living from flattened buildings".

Daher was mentioned by the media on a number of occasions prior to the July 30, 2006 airstrike on Qana. The Al Jazeera network, the Lebanese Daily Star newspaper and several other media organisations cited his casualty figures for earlier incidents in the Israeli campaign. He has previously been seen in widely distributed photographs of the 1996 shelling of Qana in which 106 people were killed and 116 injured in an Israeli attack. On that occasion, he was photographed carrying the mutilated body of a child killed in the attack.

== Qana airstrike ==
On July 30, 2006, Daher was present at the scene of the Qana bombing, which occurred only about 12 km from his office at Tyre, and was photographed there by the international media. The pictures depicted him carrying dead children away from the site of the bombing, while wearing the green helmet that led to his nickname. He issued widely quoted casualty figures for the bombing at Qana. He cited 51 fatalities including 22 children, though later reports revised this to a lower figure of 28, including 16 children.

The 2006 photographs and footage led to a number of websites labelling Daher the "Green Helmet", in reference to his distinctive headgear, and accusing him of being a member of Hezbollah and of using bodies for propaganda purposes. One website published a video that it asserted showed Daher arranging for a child's body to be taken off an ambulance to be displayed for photographers. British right-wing blogger Richard North asserted that Daher had taken control of the scene "to orchestrate false photo opportunities with the dead bodies". North later admitted to Jefferson Morley of The Washington Post that he had no evidence that Daher was connected to Hezbollah and, as he put it, "All I have to go on is gut instinct."

The Associated Press, Reuters and Agence France-Presse news agencies, whose photographers had taken the "Green Helmet" pictures, all denied that the pictures from Qana had been staged. The Washington Post's photographer Michael Robinson Chavez rejected the claims of staging, commenting: "Everyone was dead, many of them children. Nothing was set up. There was no way photos could have been altered with a dozen photographers there." The Post's ombudsman, Deborah Howell, reviewed the pictures published by the newspaper and reported that they "didn't show any obvious manipulation."

The Associated Press was eventually able to identify "Green Helmet" as Salam Daher and interviewed him twice. He strongly denied having anything to do with Hezbollah, stating that the blog allegations were not true and that he was not affiliated with any party. He told the agency: "I am just a civil defense worker. I have done this job all my life." Commenting on his display of some of the bodies at Qana, he said: "I did hold the baby up, but I was saying 'look at who the Israelis are killing. They are children. These are not fighters. They have no guns. They are children, civilians they are killing.'" He told the Associated Press that he had no regrets or apologies: "I wanted people to see who was dying. They said they were killing fighters. They killed children."

On August 13, 2006, Daher was reported to have been lightly injured in an Israeli attack near a hospital in Tyre shortly before a United Nations-brokered ceasefire in the conflict came into effect.

== See also ==
- 2006 Lebanon War photographs controversies
- Adnan Hajj photographs controversy
