= Idioglossia =

Idiosyncratic language

An idioglossia (from the Ancient Greek ἴδιος ídios, 'own, personal, distinct' and γλῶσσα glôssa, 'tongue') is an idiosyncratic language invented and spoken by only one or two people. Most often, idioglossia refers to the "private languages" of young children, especially twins, the latter being more specifically known as cryptophasia, and commonly referred to as twin talk or twin speech.

Children who are exposed to multiple languages from birth are also inclined to create idioglossias, but these languages usually disappear at a relatively early age, giving way to use of one or more of the languages introduced.

== Examples ==
=== Case studies ===
- Sam and Ren McEntee, 18-month-old twins.
- June and Jennifer Gibbons
- Kennedy twins of San Diego, California. (They named themselves "Poto and Cabengo")

=== Media ===
- Poto and Cabengo in a film of the same name by Jean-Pierre Gorin (1980)
- Twins Zarana and Zandar of the G.I. Joe franchise speak their own idioglossia.
- The 1994 film Nell, starring Jodie Foster, depicts a woman who speaks an idioglossia. The stage play on which it is based is also called Idioglossia.
- The concept album The Perfect Element, Part I, by Pain of Salvation, is centered on a song titled "Idioglossia".
- James Joyce's novel, Finnegans Wake, was written using an idioglossia.
- Skins Series 3, Episode 9 features Katie and Emily Fitch using an idioglossia.
- Sherri and Terri on The Simpsons sometimes use an idioglossia.
- The two teenage protagonists of the film Disco Pigs, Darren and Sinéad, use an idioglossia.
- Singer, musician, and composer Lisa Gerrard (of Dead Can Dance and in her solo career) sings many of her songs (e.g. "Glorafin") in an idioglossia that she has developed since the age of twelve.
- Some parts of Coil track "Batwings (A Limnal Hymn)" is in an idioglossia invented by John Balance. Peter Christopherson described it as "a language that only he knows".
- The twin brothers Jim and Tim Possible from the Disney Channel series Kim Possible often use twinspeak.
- Twins Marilyn and Carolyn Arnold from The Baby-Sitters Club book series used this early on.
- In the 2005 Law & Order: Special Victims Unit episode "Identity", teenage twins Logan and Lindsay Stanton (Reiley McClendon) speak to each other in twin language while both are being interrogated in a murder investigation by Detectives Stabler and Benson (Christopher Meloni and Mariska Hargitay, respectively). Stabler recognizes their language as "twin speak" because he himself is the father of twins and remarks that his twins had their own language when they were young as well.
- In the 2010 American Dad! episode "Son of Stan", Steve and his clone Steve-arino are briefly seen using an idioglossia in speaking to each other.
- In episode 212 of the television show Rules of Engagement, twins attending a party speak in twin language and state that twins often have their own language that only they can understand.
- The television series Second Chance have twin sister and brother Mary and Otto Goodwin, who sometimes use twin speak to communicate with each other.
- In the series finale of The Office, Angela Martin and her sister Rachael Martin use twin speak at Angela's bachelorette party.
- Some lyrics of French rock group Magma are sung in Kobaïan, an idioglossia invented by the group founder Christian Vander. The language was intended not for speaking but for singing.

== See also ==
- Conlang
- Argots, secret languages used to prevent others from understanding conversations
- Glossolalia
- Home sign, a similar phenomenon among sign languages
- Non-lexical vocables in music
