= Catherine Seipp =

American journalist

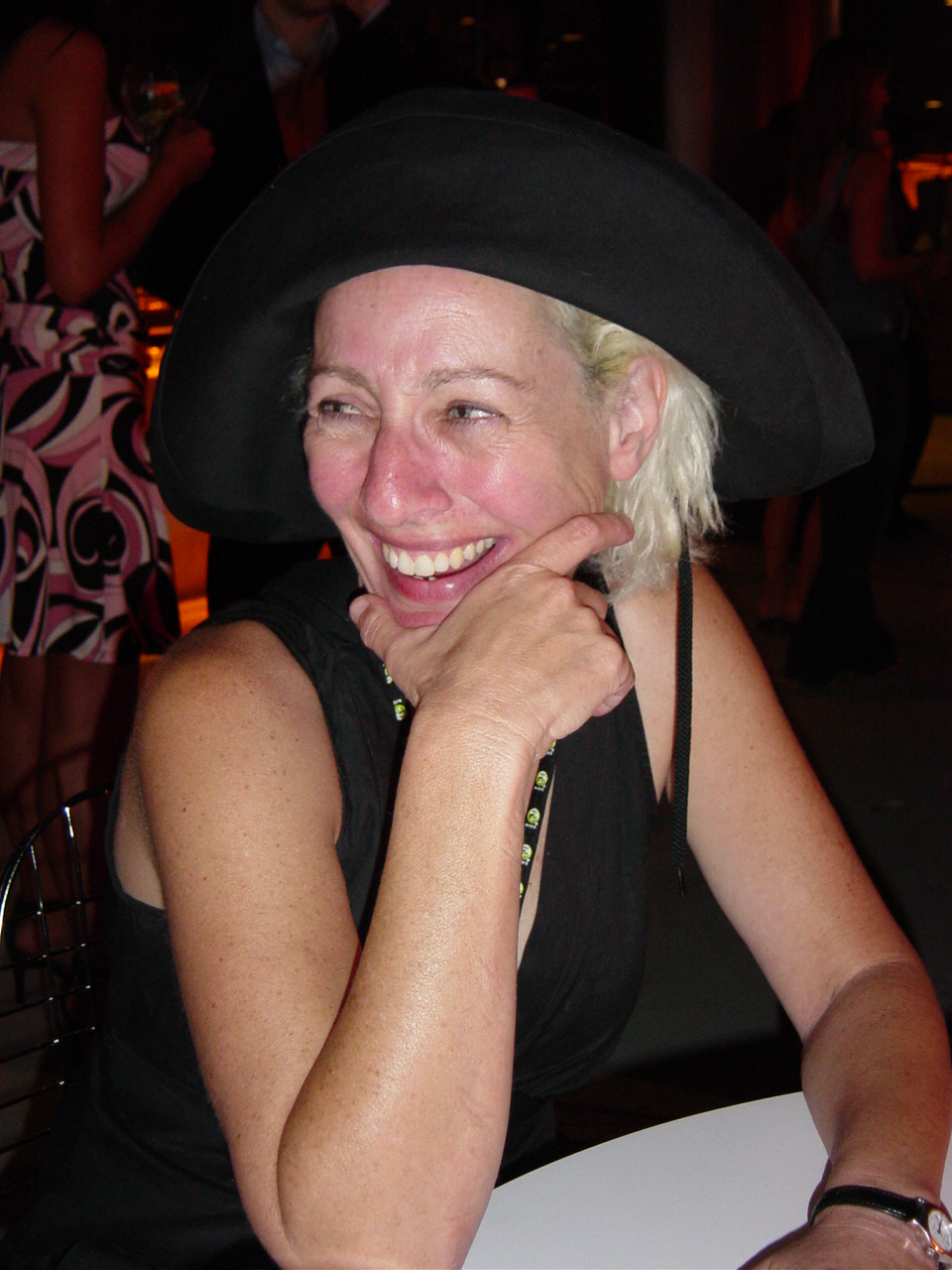
- Cathy Seipp
- Born: Catherine Seipp; November 17, 1957; Winnipeg, Manitoba, Canada
- Died: March 21, 2007 (aged 49); Los Angeles, U.S.

Catherine Seipp (/saɪp/; November 17, 1957 – March 21, 2007) was a Los Angeles freelance writer and media critic. She is best known for writing the weekly "From the Left Coast" column for National Review Online and a monthly column for the Independent Women's Forum and for her early recognition of the potential significance of the blogosphere.

== Personal life ==
Cathy Seipp was born in Winnipeg, Manitoba, Canada in November 1957. Her family moved to Los Alamitos, California when she was five years old. When she was 16, she enrolled at UCLA and earned a bachelor's degree in English.

Seipp married Jerry Lazar in 1986; their daughter, Maia, was born in 1989. Seipp and Lazar divorced in 1990, and Seipp never remarried.

== Career ==
In addition to her regular columns, Seipp wrote for a variety of publications and websites, including Buzz, Mediaweek, UPI, New York Press, TV Guide, Reason, Forbes, Salon, Penthouse, Pages, Canada's National Post, and The Wall Street Journal. During the 1980s, Seipp wrote a column titled "Miss Hot Tips" for the Los Angeles Daily News giving household hints and suggesting inexpensive but classy entertainments.

She was also a regular guest on CNBC's The Dennis Miller Show until the show's cancellation in May 2005.

== Death ==
Seipp, a non-smoker, died of lung cancer on March 21, 2007. She was survived by her parents, daughter, and sister.

== Quotes ==
- "I just want to let everyone know having cancer hasn't made me a better person."
- "And to all those proper feminists asking how I could work for a mag [Penthouse] that exploits women like that, I would suggest: Go write for a woman's mag if you want to experience an institution that exploits women."
