= Nell (film) =

- Theatrical release poster
- Directed by: Michael Apted
- Written by: William Nicholson; Mark Handley
- Based on: Idioglossia by Mark Handley (play)
- Produced by: Jodie Foster; Renée Missel; Graham Place
- Starring: Jodie Foster; Liam Neeson; Natasha Richardson; Richard Libertini
- Cinematography: Dante Spinotti
- Edited by: Jim Clark
- Music by: Mark Isham
- Production companies: PolyGram Filmed Entertainment; Egg Pictures
- Distributed by: 20th Century Fox (United States, Canada and Latin America); PolyGram Filmed Entertainment (international)
- Release date: December 16, 1994
- Running time: 112 minutes
- Country: United States
- Language: English
- Budget: $24.5 million
- Box office: $106.7 million

Nell is a 1994 American drama film directed by Michael Apted from a screenplay written by William Nicholson. The film stars Jodie Foster (who also produced) as Nell Kellty, a young North Carolina woman who has to face other people for the first time after being raised by her mother in an isolated cabin in the Great Smoky Mountains. Liam Neeson, Natasha Richardson, Richard Libertini, and Nick Searcy are featured in supporting roles. Based on Mark Handley's play Idioglossia, the script for Nell was developed by co-producer Renée Missel and was inspired by Handley's time living in the Cascade Mountains in the 1970s, and the story of Poto and Cabengo, twins who created their own language.

Nell received a limited release on December 16, 1994, before expanding into wide release on December 23 by 20th Century Fox in the United States, with PolyGram Filmed Entertainment releasing in other territories. The film received mixed reviews from critics upon its release, with praise for the direction, score, and performances, but criticism for its execution and limited exploration of the titular character. Despite this, it was a box office success, grossing over $106 million worldwide on a $24.5 million production budget.

Foster's performance was widely praised and brought her various awards and nominations. She won the inaugural Screen Actors Guild Award for Outstanding Performance by a Female Actor in a Leading Role and was nominated for the Academy Award for Best Actress and the Golden Globe Award for Best Actress – Motion Picture Drama. The film also received two additional nominations at the 52nd Golden Globe Awards for Golden Globe Award for Best Motion Picture – Drama, and Best Original Score.

== Plot ==
After Violet Kellty dies of an undiagnosed stroke in her secluded cabin in the North Carolina mountains, town physician, Dr. Jerry Lovell, discovers a frightened young woman hiding in the house rafters.

She speaks angrily and rapidly, but seems to communicate using a unique language. While examining Violet's Bible, Jerry finds a note instructing whoever discovers it to care for Violet's daughter, Nell. Graham County Sheriff Todd Peterson shows Jerry a news clipping revealing that Nell was conceived through rape. Jerry seeks assistance from Dr. Paula Olsen, a researcher specializing in autistic children. Paula, along with her colleague Dr. Al Paley, is interested in studying a wild child. Al persists in labeling Nell as such despite evidence to the contrary in filmed observations.

Paula and Al obtain a court order to institutionalize Nell for further study, but Jerry hires lawyer Don Fontana to prevent this. The judge grants Jerry and Paula three months to interact with Nell and understand her needs. Paula arrives on a houseboat equipped with electronic monitoring equipment to observe Nell's behavior, while Jerry chooses to stay in a tent near Nell's cabin to quietly observe her.

Paula eventually deduces that Nell's seemingly indecipherable language is a form of English, influenced by her mother's aphasic speech after a stroke and her secret language shared with her deceased identical twin sister. A tentative friendship forms between Jerry and Paula. Nell, who sleeps during the day and only ventures outside after sunset, comes to trust Jerry, viewing him as the "gah'inja" her mother promised would arrive. Jerry later realizes that "gah'inja" is Nell's term for "guardian angel."

To alleviate Nell's fear of evildoers and the possibility of rape, Paula encourages Jerry to swim with Nell in the lake, allowing her to feel his body, hug him, and have fun. Using popcorn as an incentive, Jerry succeeds in coaxing Nell outside into the sunlight. Nell leads Jerry and Paula to the decayed remains of her identical twin sister, May, who died in a fall while playing in the woods.

When reporter Mike Ibarra learns of Nell's existence and visits her cabin, Nell initially displays curiosity, but the camera flash frightens her. Jerry intervenes, ejecting the reporter. He later realizes the reporter isn't from the press and apologizes for overreacting but requests that he forget their encounter. Paula believes that Nell would be safer in a hospital, while Jerry argues for leaving Nell alone to live as she pleases. An argument ensues, with Paula accusing Jerry of exploiting Nell for his own satisfaction. However, Nell manages to calm them down after overhearing their conversation.

Ultimately, they decide to introduce Nell to the world, taking her to town. There, Nell befriends Mary, Todd's depressed wife, goes shopping with Jerry and Paula, but also encounters some unruly boys in a pool hall. Jerry intervenes when they ask her to expose herself. Jerry and Paula provide Nell with a book about love, romance, and intimacy to help her understand the concept. She demonstrates her understanding by having Jerry and Paula touch each other's faces, strengthening their bond.

With increased media intrusion, Jerry and Paula take Nell to a hospital for her protection. There, Nell becomes extremely despondent and unresponsive after seeing a vision of May. Jerry removes her from the hospital and hides her in a hotel. Paula joins him, and the two confess their love for each other.

At the subsequent court hearing, Al, who wants to study Nell in a controlled environment, asserts that Nell has Asperger syndrome and should be institutionalized. Nell then steps forward and, with Jerry interpreting, speaks for herself, reassuring everyone that there is no need to fear or worry for her, as her sorrows are no greater than anyone else's.

Five years later, Jerry and Paula bring their daughter, Ruthie, to visit Nell in her house on her birthday, and friends surround her. Nell treats Ruthie like a little sister and takes her to the lake, although this reminds her of May.

== Cast ==
- Jodie Foster as Nell Kellty
- Liam Neeson as Dr. Jerry Lovell
- Natasha Richardson as Dr. Paula Olsen
- Richard Libertini as Dr. Al Paley
- Nick Searcy as Sheriff Todd Peterson
- Jeremy Davies as Billy Fisher
- O'Neal Compton as Don Fontana
- Robin Mullins as Mary Peterson
- Heather M. Bomba and Marianne E. Bomba as Twins
- Sean Bridgers as Mike Ibarra
- Joe Inscoe as Judge
- Stephanie Dawn Wood as Ruthie Lovell
- Nicole Adair as Autistic Child
- Marlon Jackson as Male Nurse

== Production ==
Production took place in North Carolina, including the town of Robbinsville and the city of Charlotte.

About the nude skinny-dipping scenes, Michael Apted said that Jodie Foster accepted them without problems, only complaining about the coldness of the water.

== Reception ==
=== Box office ===
The film debuted with $5.7 million. It eventually grossed $33.6 million domestically while bringing over $73 million around the world to a total of $106.6 million worldwide.

=== Critical response ===
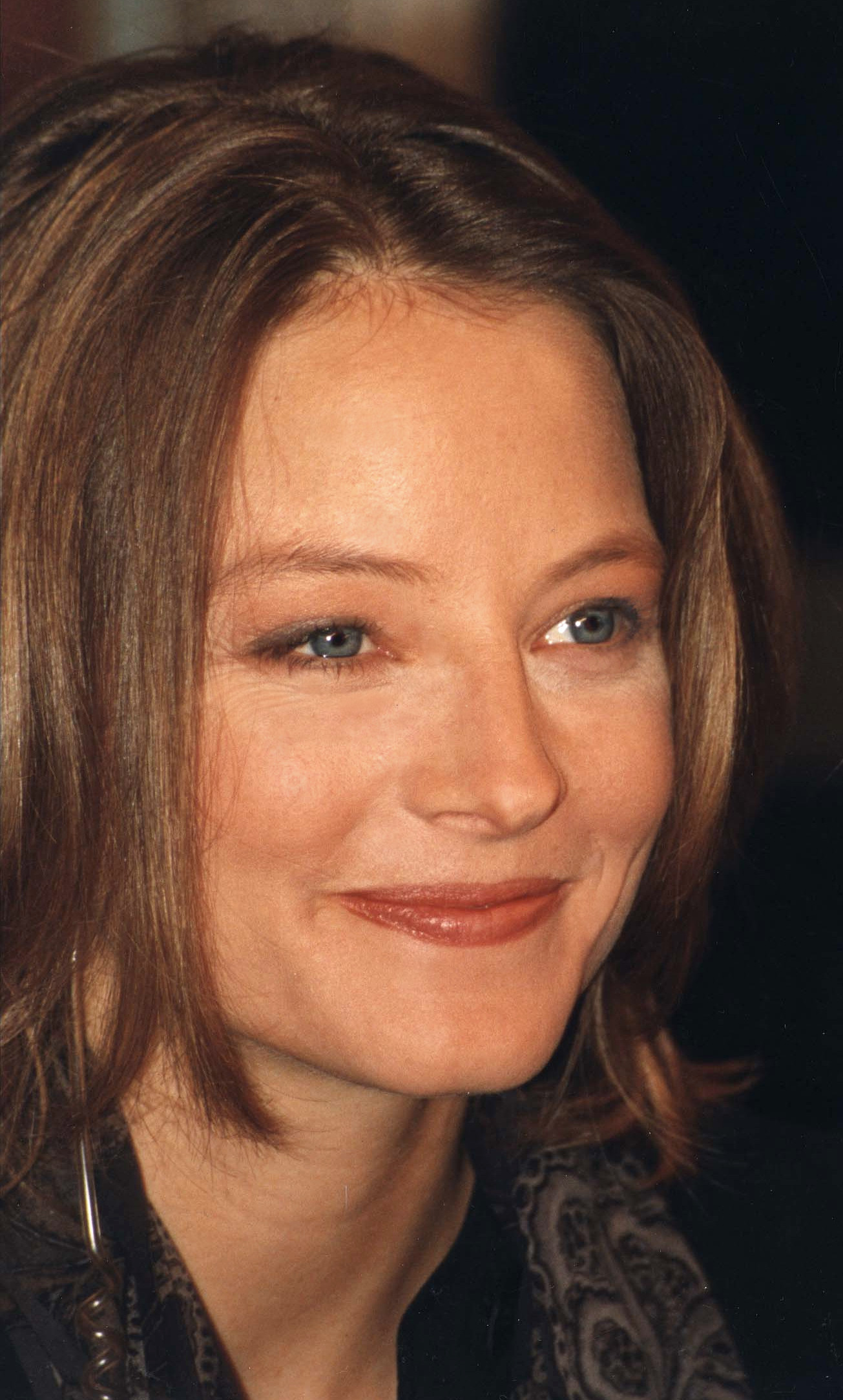
Jodie Foster's performance garnered widespread critical acclaim, earning her the Screen Actors Guild Award for Outstanding Performance by a Female Actor in a Leading Role, in addition to a nomination for the Academy Award for Best Actress.

Nell received mixed reviews from critics, who praised the cast but criticised the screenplay. Foster received widespread praise for her performance. The Washington Post's review noted that "Jodie Foster, transcendent in the bravura title role, is far grander than the film itself, and her performance helps camouflage the weaknesses of its structure and the naivete of its themes." In her review for The New York Times, Janet Maslin noted that: "For all its technical brilliance, not even Ms. Foster's intense, accomplished performance in the title role holds much surprise. The wild-child story of 'Nell' unfolds in unexpectedly predictable ways, clinging fiercely to the banal thought that Nell's innocence makes her purer than anyone else in the story." Maslin also wished the film had explored Nell's adult sexuality. Roger Ebert liked the movie, commenting that "Despite its predictable philosophy, however, Nell is an effective film, and a moving one." He also singled out the performances of Foster and Neeson. The film holds a score of 57% on Rotten Tomatoes from 35 reviews as of 2022, and with an average rating of 5.20/10. The site's consensus states: "Despite a committed performance by Jodie Foster, Nell opts for ponderous melodrama instead of engaging with the ethical dilemmas of socializing its titular wild child." On Metacritic it has a score of 60% based on reviews from 23 critics.

=== Year-end lists ===
- 2nd – John Hurley, Staten Island Advance
- 5th – Christopher Sheid, The Munster Times
- Top 10 (listed alphabetically, not ranked) – Eleanor Ringel, The Atlanta Journal-Constitution
- Top 10 (listed alphabetically, not ranked) – Jeff Simon, The Buffalo News
- Honorable mention – Betsy Pickle, Knoxville News-Sentinel
- Honorable mention – Duane Dudek, Milwaukee Sentinel
- Honorable mention – Michael MacCambridge, Austin American-Statesman

=== Accolades ===
Award	Subject	Nominee	Result
Academy Awards	Best Actress	Jodie Foster	Nominated
Chicago Film Critics Association Awards	Best Actress	Jodie Foster	Nominated
Dallas–Fort Worth Film Critics Association Awards	Best Actress	Jodie Foster	Won
David di Donatello Awards	Best Foreign Actress	Jodie Foster	Won
MTV Movie Awards	Best Female Performance	Jodie Foster	Nominated
Los Angeles Film Critics Association Awards	Best Actress	Jodie Foster	Runner-up
Boston Society of Film Critics Awards	Best Actress	Jodie Foster	Runner-up
National Society of Film Critics Awards	Best Actress	Jodie Foster	Runner-up
New York Film Critics Circle Awards	Best Actress	Jodie Foster	Runner-up
Goldene Kamera	Best International Actress	Jodie Foster	Won
Screen Actors Guild Awards	Outstanding Performance by a Female Actor in a Leading Role	Jodie Foster	Won
Southeastern Film Critics Association Awards	Best Actress	Jodie Foster	Won
Golden Screen Awards	Best Actress	Jodie Foster	Won
Golden Globe Awards	Best Actress in a Motion Picture – Drama	Jodie Foster	Nominated
Golden Globe Awards	Best Motion Picture - Drama	Jodie Foster	Nominated
Golden Globe Awards	Best Motion Picture - Drama	Renee Missel	Nominated
Golden Globe Awards	Best Motion Picture - Drama	Graham Place	Nominated
Golden Globe Awards	Best Original Score	Mark Isham	Nominated
