= Cryptophasia =

Phenomenon of a language developed by twins

Cryptophasia is the phenomenon of a language developed by twins (identical or fraternal) that only the two children can understand. The word has its roots from the Greek crypto-, meaning secret, and -phasia, meaning speech. Most linguists associate cryptophasia with idioglossia, which is any language used by only one, or very few, people. Cryptophasia differs from idioglossia on including mirrored actions like twin-walk and identical mannerisms.

== Classification ==
It has been reported that up to 50% of young twins will have their own twin language which they use to communicate only with each other and which cannot be understood by others. "In all cases known, the language consists of onomatopoeic expressions, some neologisms, but for the greatest part of words from the adult language adapted to the constrained phonological possibilities of young children. These words being hardly recognizable, the language may turn out to be completely unintelligible to speakers of the parents' languages, but they resemble each other in that they lack inflectional morphology and that word order is based on pragmatic principles such as saliency and the semantic scope of words. Neither the structure of the languages nor its emergence can be explained by other than situational factors."

== Causes ==
A delay in the phonological development of one or both twins (or two siblings at similar age of language development) is said to be a main cause of cryptophasia. Twins can develop the ability to communicate with one another without working within the grammar of their parents' language, thus possibly leading to a short-term delay in linguistic development of one or both twins. The causes seem largely not to be in the greater pre- and perinatal biological problems twins may experience, but rather in postnatal factors. These factors occur within the family environment and include both a reduced quality of verbal stimulation and interaction with adult language models which result from greater demands of care-giving made on parents of twins, and the intensive interaction between twins which may increase their chances of developing cryptophasia and idioglossia at the expense of conventional language.

== Social effects ==
An article in Slate dealt with what is observed about the social effects of cryptophasia between twins and how it relates to societies. "Societies need unambiguous ways to distinguish between subject and object," Bakker says. "In the twin situation these can be dispensed with, but not in languages in which it is necessary to refer to events outside the direct situation."

== Examples ==
June and Jennifer Gibbons were twin sisters living in Wales whose language may have been an example of cryptophasia. It was exemplified by the twins' simultaneous actions, which often mirrored each other.

Grace and Virginia Kennedy, born in the United States in 1970, developed their own private language, characterized by an extremely fast tempo and staccato rhythm.

== See also ==
- Language creation in artificial intelligence, the phenomenon of bots creating a private language
