= Enemies, A Love Story =

1972 novel by Isaac Bashevis Singer

- First English edition
- Author: Isaac Bashevis Singer
- Original title: Sonim, di geshikhte fun a libe
- Translator: Aliza Shevrin and Elizabeth Shub
- Language: Yiddish
- Publisher: Farrar, Straus and Giroux
- Publication date: 1966
- Publication place: United States
- English publication date: 1972
- Media type: Print (Paperback & Hardback)
- Pages: 228 pp
- ISBN: 0-374-51522-0
- OCLC: 31348418

Enemies, A Love Story (Yiddish: Sonim, di geshikhte fun a libe) is a tragicomedy novel by Isaac Bashevis Singer first published serially in the Jewish Daily Forward on February 11, 1966. The English translation was published in 1972.

In 2022, the originally serialized novel was released for the first time in book format in standard Yiddish from online copies of the Forverts.

== Plot summary ==
It's New York City, a few years after World War II. Herman Broder, a formerly Orthodox Jewish man who has lost his faith but still enjoys Talmudic scholarship, is married to a Polish woman named Yadwiga Pracz, not of Jewish origin, who had worked as a servant in his father's family in Poland and had kept Herman alive, during the Holocaust in Poland, by hiding him in a hayloft for three years in her native village. Almost all Herman's family perished in the Holocaust, including, he believes, his first wife, Tamara, whom an eyewitness told him was shot by the Einsatzgruppen, along with the couple's two children. Broder married Yadwiga after he received a visa for the United States, perhaps partly out of a sense of obligation. He brought her to Brooklyn, and in their apartment in Coney Island, she works diligently as a homemaker, learning how to cook Ashkenazi Jewish foods as matzo balls with borscht, carp's head, and challah, but although there are moments of tenderness between them, it isn't a happy union. He calls her a "peasant" to her face and mocks her desire to undergo conversion to Judaism. He has told her that he works as a book salesman and that he has to travel for his job up and down the Eastern seaboard, but in fact he works as a ghost-writer for a corrupt rabbi in Manhattan named Milton Lampert and the nights that Yadwiga thinks he's on the road, he is in fact spending in the Bronx in a second apartment he secretly rents for his mistress, Masha, a severely traumatized Holocaust survivor, and her mother, a pious woman named Shifrah Puah. Herman isolates himself from the larger Jewish community, in part because he is also traumatised by hiding in the barn during the Holocaust and often daydreams about what it would be like to similarly have to hide for many years in whatever room he happens to be in—in part because he is ashamed of his somewhat disreputable line of work, and in part because he longs to hide his double life with Yadwiga and Masha. This romantic arrangement becomes even more complicated when Herman reads his name in a classified ad in a Yiddish newspaper, answers it, and learns that Tamara also survived the Holocaust and is in New York City. The comedy of the novel consists in Herman's doomed attempts to keep all three women from knowing about one another; the tragedy is in the inability of Herman and other characters to make the accommodations and compromises that would reconcile them to having survived.

== Critical reception ==
The New York Times wrote that "Singer's marvelously pointed humor has turned black and bitter, the sex is flat, and there is little irony or selfconsciousness," and condemned Enemies as "a bleak, obsessive novel that offers neither release nor hope." The Times Literary Supplement (London), on the other hand, praised the novel's "larger moral subtleties" and considered it "a fine addition to a legendary body of work," and the New York Review of Books, after noting that Enemies was "a religious novel in its way," wrote that the book "adds to invention, wit, and observation the sympathetic imagination of a writer of genius and an understanding of the important but cruelly narrow possibilities of this world."

== Adaptations ==
An eponymous film, based on the book and directed by Paul Mazursky, was released in 1989.

The book was adapted for the theater by Sarah Schulman and premiered at the Wilma Theater in Philadelphia in 2007.

The novel was adapted as an opera by Ben Moore; it premiered at Palm Beach Opera in 2015.
