= James Taranto =

American journalist (born 1966)

- Born: January 6, 1966 (age 60)
- Occupations: Journalist, columnist, editor

James Taranto (born January 6, 1966) is an American journalist. He is editorial features editor for The Wall Street Journal, in charge of the newspaper's op-ed pages, both print and digital. He was formerly editor of its online editorial page OpinionJournal.com and joined the newspaper's editorial board in 2007. As noted by New York Magazine, he has been described as "the Journal's Rush Limbaugh".

Taranto wrote the daily online column Best of the Web Today, which typically included political, social, and media commentary in the form of conventional opinion writing as well as puns and other forms of wordplay and other recurring themes on news stories crowdsourced from readers. His final column was published on January 3, 2017, after which he became editorial features editor.

Before joining the Wall Street Journal in 1996, Taranto spent five years as an editor at City Journal, published by conservative think tank the Manhattan Institute for Policy Research. He has also worked for the Heritage Foundation and Reason magazine. He pursued a degree in journalism at California State University, Northridge (CSUN) but "never bothered to graduate" after "conflict with teachers and professors".

== Rooster incident ==
While attending CSUN, Taranto worked as news editor and also as one of two opinion page editors for the Daily Sundial student newspaper. On March 5, 1987, Taranto published an opinion piece criticizing a controversy at the University of California, Los Angeles, in which the editor of the Daily Bruin student newspaper was suspended after the paper published a comic strip depicting a rooster admitted to the university via affirmative action. Accompanying Taranto's column was a reprint of the rooster cartoon. Journalism professor and Daily Sundial publisher Cynthia Rawitch suspended Taranto for two weeks without pay. Acting on Taranto's behalf, the American Civil Liberties Union Foundation of Southern California filed suit against Rawitch and other members of the CSUN journalism school. The suit was settled before trial on terms favorable to Taranto and the ACLU.

== Best of the Web Today ==
Under Taranto, Best of the Web Today was a column published weekday afternoons on WSJ.com. It began as an anonymous web column collecting interesting links. (The title and the use of the editorial "we" come from that era.) Within a year it became a bylined column with commentary as well as links. Many of the items came from suggestions by readers, and each column ends with thanks to those who contributed to it. A three part quinquennial retrospective of the column appeared in 2005. In his final column, Taranto announced that the Best of the Web Today feature would return with another editorial writer taking the reins.
