= Poto and Cabengo =

Twins who used an invented language

Poto and Cabengo (names given, respectively, by Grace and Virginia Kennedy to themselves) are American identical twins who used an invented language (cryptophasia) until the age of about eight.

The girls were apparently of normal intelligence. They developed their own communication as they had little exposure to spoken language in their early years. Poto and Cabengo were the names they called each other.

Poto and Cabengo is also the name of a documentary film about the girls made by Jean-Pierre Gorin and released in 1980.

== Birth ==
Grace and Virginia Kennedy were born in 1970 in Columbus, Georgia. Their birth was normal, and they were able to lift their heads and make eye contact with their parents within hours after birth, but both soon suffered apparent seizures. Their father maintained that a surgeon told him the girls might experience developmental disabilities. Apparently mistaking speculation for diagnosis, the girls' parents ceased to pay more attention to them than necessary.

== Early circumstances ==
Both parents were employed (although later characterized by The San Diego Tribune as living on "food stamps and welfare") and spent many hours away from home. The girls were left in the care of a grandmother who met their physical needs but did not play or interact with them. The grandmother spoke only German, while the parents spoke English. Kept largely isolated from the world, they had no contact with other children, seldom played outdoors, and were not sent to school.

Their father later stated in interviews that he realized the girls had invented a language of their own, but, since their use of English remained extremely rudimentary, he had decided that they were, as the doctor suggested, developmentally challenged and that it would do no good to send them to school.

When he lost his job, he told a caseworker at the unemployment office about his family; the caseworker advised him to put the girls in speech therapy. At the Children's Hospital of San Diego, in California, speech therapists Ann Koeneke and Alexa Kratze (née Romaine) discovered that Virginia and Grace had invented a complex idioglossia.

== Language ==
The twins' language was characterized by an extremely fast tempo and a staccato rhythm, traits the girls transferred to their spoken English following speech therapy. Linguistic analysis revealed that their language was a mixture of English and German (their mother and grandmother were German born) with some neologisms and several idiosyncratic grammatical features.

The story of the "twins who made their own language" received media coverage in 1978 and was included in an edition of the People's Almanac. Speech and hearing experts and psychiatrists offered speculation as to why, in contrast to most idioglossic twins, the girls had failed to pick up English. Alexa Kratze pointed out that the girls had had very little contact with anyone outside their family and that contact within the family had been minimal at best, factors that contributed to the girls' developmental disability.

Once it was established that the girls could be educated, their father apparently forbade them to speak their personal language. Time magazine wrote that, when asked by a visitor to the household if the girls remembered their language, Ginny responded that they did. However, their father dismissed this response as "lying." He is quoted as saying: "You live in a society, you got to speak the language. They don't want to be associated as dummies now." Despite being mainstreamed and placed in separate classes, the girls remained affected by their family's emotional neglect. A follow-up as they approached the age of 30 revealed that Virginia worked on an assembly line in a supervised job training center, while Grace mopped floors at the fast-food restaurant McDonald's.

== Sample speech extract ==
"Pinit, putahtraletungay." (Finish, potato salad hungry.)

"Nis, Poto?" (This, Poto?)

"Liba Cabingoat, it." (Dear Cabengo, eat.)

"Ia moa, Poto?" (Here more, Poto?)

"Ya." (Yeah.)
