= John F. Kennedy document hoax =

1993 American political hoax

One of the forged documents, supposedly signed and dated by John F. Kennedy in 1961, showing an anachronistic ZIP Code

In 1993, Lawrence X. Cusack III forged 350 documents from, or relating to, John F. Kennedy, the president of the United States from 1961 to 1963. Some of the forged documents purportedly showed that Kennedy had dealings with organized crime (through Sam Giancana of the Chicago Outfit), tax evasion, bribery of FBI Director J. Edgar Hoover, payment of hush money to actress Marilyn Monroe for being Kennedy's lover, and a secret first marriage.

Cusack was the son of Lawrence X. Cusack Jr., the New York-based founder of the law firm Cusack & Stiles. Cusack Jr. was appointed as a guardian of the estate of Gladys Pearl Baker, Monroe's mother, in the 1970s. Cusack was employed in his father's firm from the late 1980s. He claimed that his father had advised Kennedy on numerous sensitive and personal matters and that he found the papers in the archives of Cusack & Stiles.

Cusack sold the papers through memorabilia dealers for between six and seven million dollars. (Note: $6 million in 1993 equates to approximately $13,372,000 and $7 million equates to approximately $15,601,000 in 2025, according to calculations based on the United States Consumer Price Index measure of inflation.) One of the collectors involved suggested showing them to the investigative journalist Seymour Hersh, who was in the process of writing The Dark Side of Camelot (1997), a history of the Kennedy presidency and his assassination. Hersh began including information about the documents in his book and proposed a documentary to be released at the same time. It was during the checks of the documents by the NBC television network and then by ABC News in preparing the documentary that flaws in the forgeries led to their discovery. These included the use of a ZIP Code in a document purportedly signed in 1961 (the ZIP Code was introduced in 1963), and the use of a Prestige Pica font typeball that had not been invented at the time the document was signed. Other mistakes included the use of "lift-off" type to adjust a spelling error in Kennedy's name and where a written signature had removed a tiny part of the type underneath it, which had been made by using a modern plastic typewriter ribbon; these were not available in the early 1960s.

The forgeries were uncovered in mid-1997, while Hersh was still writing The Dark Side of Camelot, and he removed a chapter and some additional material that had been based on the Cusack documents. In September 1997, ABC confronted Cusack with the discovery of the fraud, but Cusack denied the accusations. Cusack was arrested and tried on thirteen charges of mail and wire fraud; he was found guilty on all charges and was sentenced in 1999 to nine years and seven months' imprisonment; he was also ordered to return the money to the people who had purchased the documents from him.

== Background ==
=== John F. Kennedy and Marilyn Monroe ===
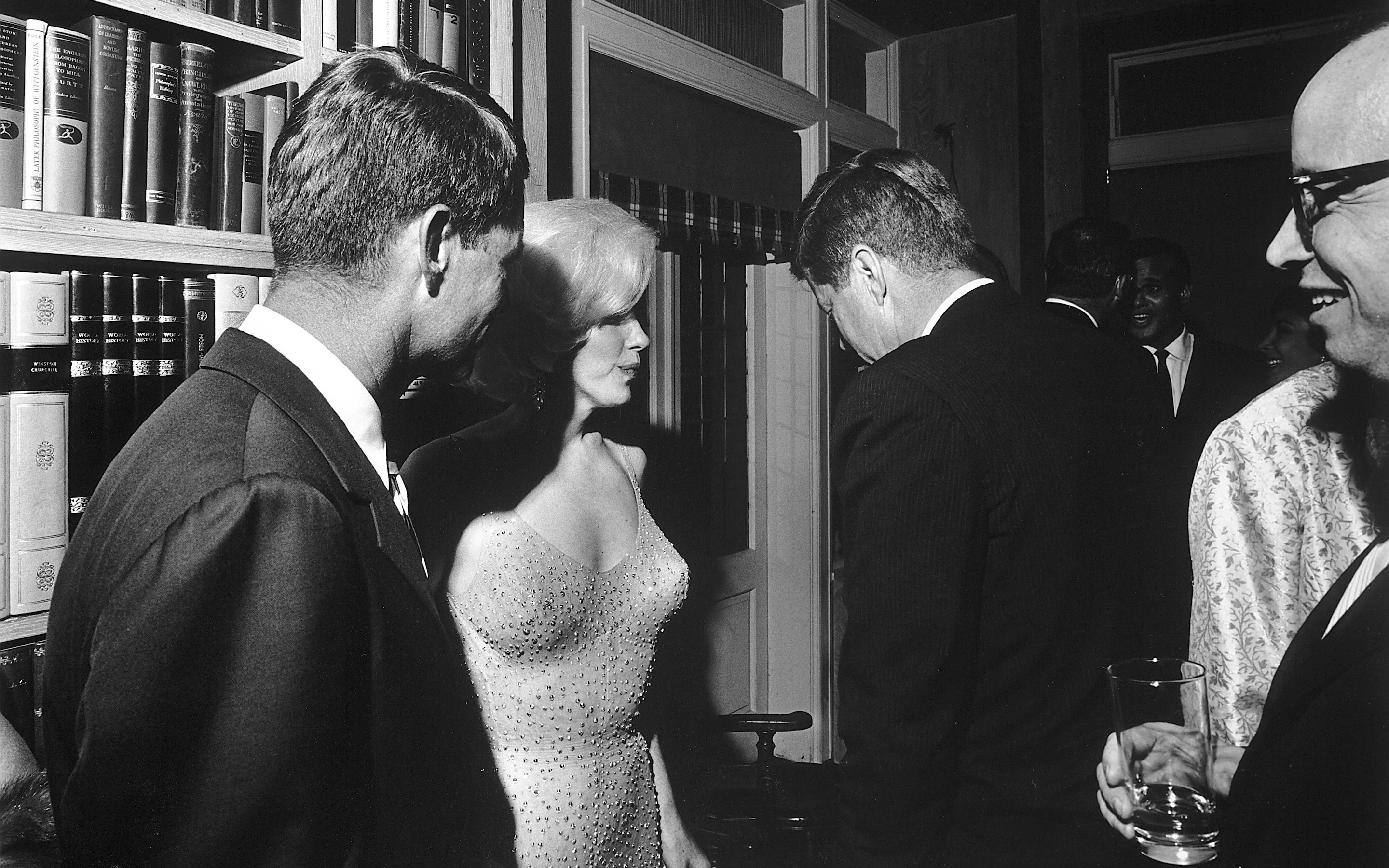
Robert F. Kennedy, Marilyn Monroe and John F. Kennedy at the president's early birthday party on May 19, 1962; Arthur M. Schlesinger Jr. looks on.

John F. Kennedy was likely romantically involved with actress Marilyn Monroe at some point during his presidency, which lasted from 1961 until his assassination in 1963. While biographers differ in their opinions of the length or depth of any relationship, Monroe's biographer Donald Spoto observes that an affair between the two "has been assumed for so long that it has achieved as solid a place in public awareness as almost any other event in the man's presidency". Spoto judges that, on balance:

if the phrase "love affair" describes a protracted intimacy sustained by some degree of frequency, then such a connection between these two is impossible to establish with any of the rudimentary tools of historico-critical studies. In the absence of such evidence, no serious biographer can identify Monroe and Kennedy as partners in a love affair.

Journalist Lawrence J. Quirk describes Kennedy and Monroe's association as an "on-again, off-again affair", although actor Peter Lawford, who was Kennedy's brother-in-law, described the speculation as "garbage". Spoto describes four occasions between October 1961 and August 1962 when Kennedy and Monroe are known to have met; on one of those occasions the couple were in a bedroom when Monroe phoned one of her friends. She later told a confidant that she and Kennedy had sex only on that one occasion. The telephone logs of the White House show numerous calls from Monroe to Kennedy, and, according to Kennedy's biographer Richard Reeves, she had previously told people both of the affair and that she wanted to marry Kennedy.

=== Seymour Hersh and The Dark Side of Camelot ===
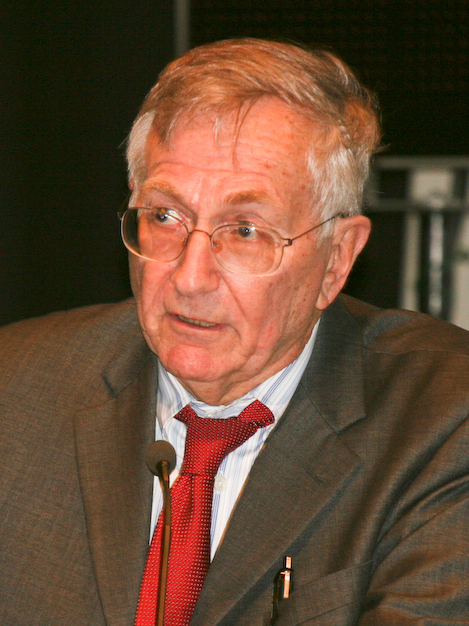
Seymour Hersh in 2009

Seymour Hersh, an investigative journalist and political writer, came to prominence in 1969 for his reporting on the My Lai massacre and its cover-up during the Vietnam War, for which he received the 1970 Pulitzer Prize for International Reporting. As of 2024, Hersh has also won the George Polk Award five times, the National Book Critics Circle Award, two National Magazine Awards, an Overseas Press Club award, and the National Press Foundation's Distinguished Contributions to Journalism award.

In August 1993, Hersh and publishers Little, Brown and Company signed a $1 million deal for the publication of a book, The Dark Side of Camelot, described by Hersh as "about John F. Kennedy and the CIA—a hidden history". (Note: $1 million in 1993 equates to approximately $2,229,000 in 2025, according to calculations based on the United States Consumer Price Index measure of inflation.) The publisher thought the book would sell well, and by August 1996 it had decided on a first print run of either 250,000 copies – an amount described by journalist Frederick M. Winship as "unusually large" – or 350,000.

=== Lawrence X. Cusack Jr. and Lawrence X. Cusack III ===
Lawrence X. Cusack Jr. was a founding partner of the law firm of Cusack & Stiles, which was based at 61 Broadway in Manhattan, New York. During the 1970s Cusack Jr. was the president of the New York County Lawyers' Association. He was a lawyer for the Roman Catholic Archdiocese of New York, and in that role he acted as a personal representative for Cardinal Francis Spellman and testified before the Senate Subcommittee on Education in 1963. Cusack Jr. was also the personal counsel to Cardinal John O'Connor. Cusack Jr. died on October 28, 1985, aged 66. O'Connor officiated at his funeral. In the 1970s, a Surrogate's Court judge appointed Cusack Jr. as a guardian of the estate of Gladys Pearl Baker, Monroe's mother. This is the only known connection he had to either Monroe or John F. Kennedy.

One of Cusack Jr.'s sons was his namesake, Lawrence X. Cusack III. Cusack attended Loyola School and Columbia University, both in New York, before enrolling in New York Law School in 1984. He also had formal training as an artist and draftsman. After his father's death, Cusack & Stiles lent Cusack $5,000 for his studies. When he completed his courses, he went to work at the firm, where he was employed either as a clerk or paralegal. His salary was $40,000, and he had considerable debts.

Many of the claims Cusack made about his past were subsequently proved to be untrue. His marriage notice in The New York Times stated that he graduated cum laude with a master's degree in architecture from Harvard University and that he was studying law at New York University; neither was true. He never studied at Harvard, but had only audited one of its courses, and he had never attended New York University. Cusack would also claim he had a career in naval intelligence and that he was a United States Naval Reserve officer, even possessing – and wearing – a lieutenant commander's Navy uniform with medal ribbons. Cusack had never joined the Navy nor served in its reserve. On an application for a firearms license made in 1992, he listed previous service with the US Marines, US Navy, National Security Agency, and at the Naval Air Station Pensacola, none of which was true.

== Production and sale of the documents ==
People implicated in criminal acts with the Kennedys in the forged papers

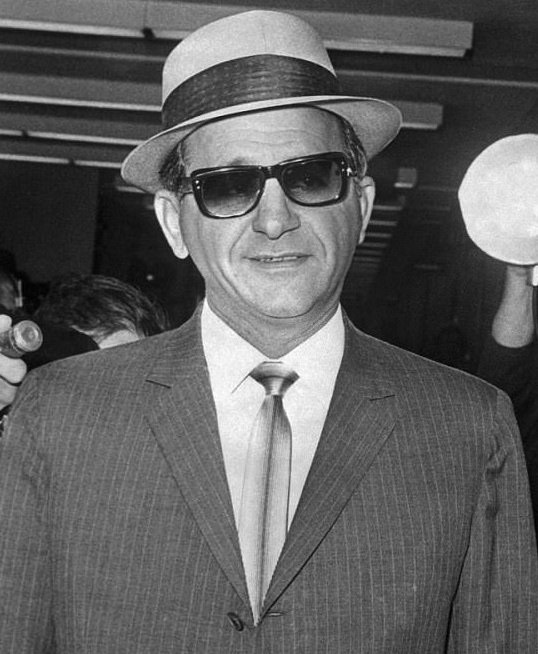
Sam Giancana of the Chicago Outfit

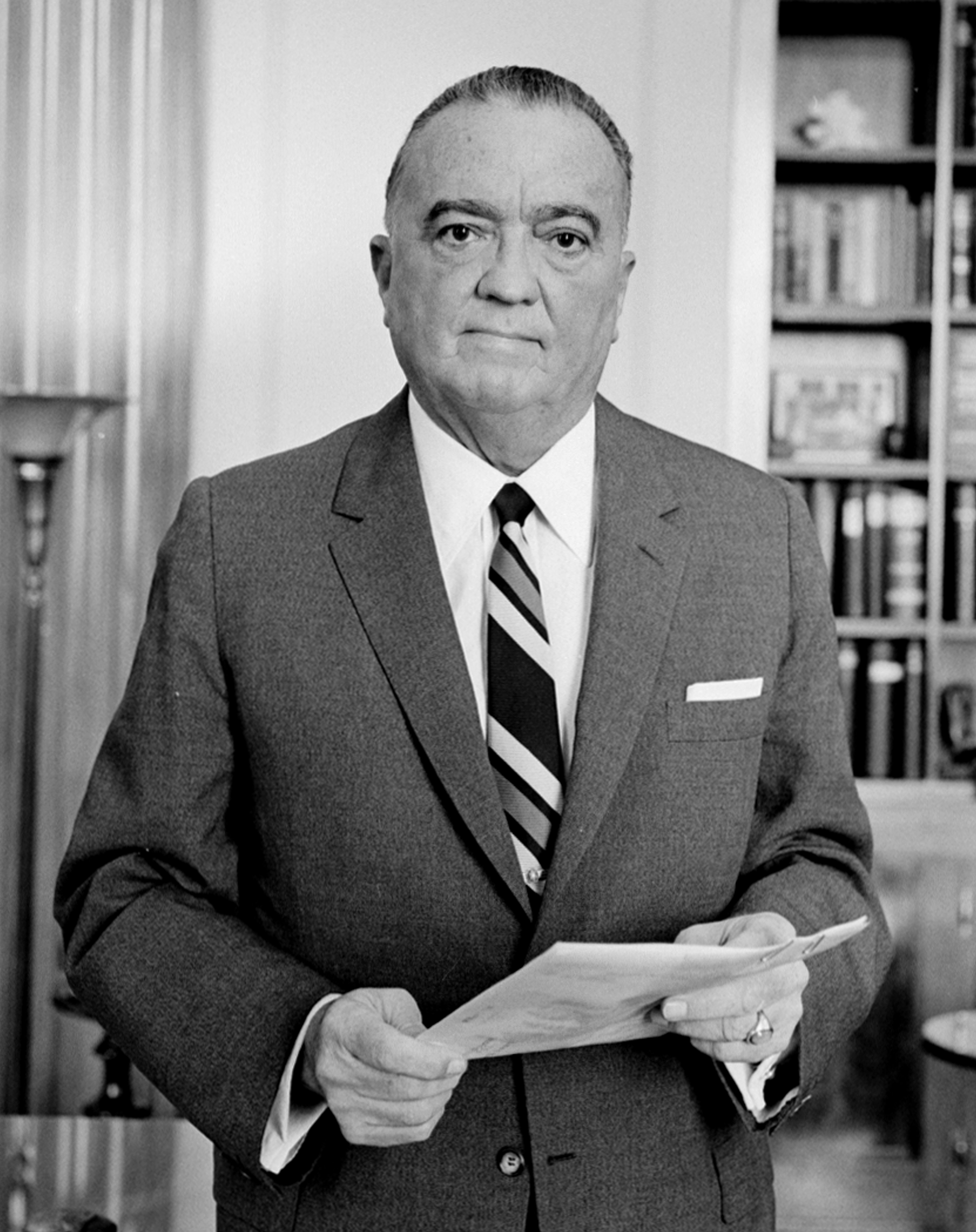
J. Edgar Hoover, the Director of the FBI

In the early 1990s, Cusack met John Reznikoff, a dealer in historical memorabilia, to sell a small collection of stamps left by Cusack's father. (Note: In addition to documents, Reznikoff also deals in coins, stamps and celebrity hair, including samples from Abraham Lincoln, Napoleon, and Geronimo.) The two men became friends, and, during the course of their conversation, Reznikoff told Cusack that documents relating to Kennedy were highly sought-after and valuable. Soon after, Cusack claimed to have discovered 350 documents purportedly held by his father and written by Kennedy. To give credibility to his story, Cusack claimed that between 1959 and 1963 his father had counseled Kennedy on numerous sensitive and personal matters. The documents Cusack forged supposedly showed that Kennedy had dealings with organized crime, by paying Sam Giancana of the Chicago Outfit to fix the 1960 presidential election for him. They also purportedly showed that Kennedy bribed J. Edgar Hoover, the Director of the Federal Bureau of Investigation (FBI), to keep quiet about Kennedy's sexual activities. Other fabrications in the papers included tax evasion by Kennedy; the payment of hush money to Monroe as his lover; and a secret first marriage in 1939, prior to that between Kennedy and Jackie Bouvier in 1953. Cusack stole genuine deeds from archives at Cusack & Stiles concerning a transfer of land from the Kennedy family to the New York Archdiocese to give verisimilitude to the documents he forged. Within the collection were six handwritten copies of the same document, all with the same date and all supposedly written by Kennedy; two other identical handwritten copies were also later found in the offices of Cusack & Stiles. Cusack later explained that he practiced copying Kennedy's writing, which he claimed was so he could properly read Kennedy's untidy script.

Cusack showed some of the documents to Reznikoff to compare with known samples of Kennedy's handwriting. The pair then showed the samples to Charles Hamilton, a handwriting expert; Hamilton saw half a dozen samples and stated that he thought these were in Kennedy's handwriting. Cusack and Reznikoff chose Tom Cloud, a precious-metals dealer who also traded in memorabilia, to offer the documents for sale. Cloud was told that further verifications of the handwriting were being conducted by two document specialists, Robert White and Herman Darvick. In November 1993, Cusack, Reznikoff and Cloud finalized their agreement: Cloud would act as the seller for a commission of between ten and twenty percent; Reznikoff would receive about the same, and the remainder would go to Cusack. Investors in the papers had to sign an agreement not to "release, publicize, or in any other way make public" the existence of the documents until May 31, 1998. The plan was to build interest after the 1998 launch and then stage a high-profile auction to enable the original investors to resell for a high profit. Several investors formed a group to purchase the forged papers being offered and paid between six and seven million dollars to own a share of the papers prior to the auction.

One of those to whom Reznikoff showed the documents was Hal Kass, a businessman and collector. The two discussed finding a writer to publish a book on the papers and initially considered contacting novelist Tom Clancy. Kass suggested Seymour Hersh as a better choice and knew he was writing a book on the Kennedys at the time. Hersh was contacted in December 1994 and shown some of the papers; he was interested in the story immediately. According to journalists Evan Thomas and Mark Hosenball, Hersh then decided to change the focus of the book away from the assassination and towards the information in Cusack's Kennedy documents.

After six months of negotiations, on July 3, 1995, Hersh signed an agreement that gave him complete and exclusive access to all of Cusack's documents prior to the planned auction. Hersh undertook background checks on Cusack and established that he had never been in the intelligence services; he was not concerned that Cusack's claims were false – instead, he later said, he was relieved that Cusack was not a spy. He also commented, "In my business, you don't really go around psychoanalyzing people who give you stuff. You grab it. I deal with all sorts of wackos." With the new information from the Cusack documents, Hersh negotiated an additional advance from Little, Brown of $250,000. (Note: $250,000 in 1995 equates to approximately $528,000 in 2025, according to calculations based on the United States Consumer Price Index measure of inflation.)

Hersh decided that the best way to boost the story's standing was through television. Based on the documents and the agreement of former Secret Service members to appear on film – the agents he had been interviewing for his book – NBC paid Cusack and producer Mark Obenhaus $1 million for a television documentary that was to last either one or two hours. (Note: $1 million in 1995 equates to approximately $2,113,000 in 2025, according to calculations based on the United States Consumer Price Index measure of inflation.) In August 1996, Hersh and Obenhaus began filming the documentary, but NBC informed them that the network had decided to cancel the project. NBC executive Warren Littlefield subsequently stated that he had told Hersh: "in our investigation of the documents, serious questions have been raised that we cannot answer", although Hersh denies ever having been informed of this. In November 1996, ABC News stepped in with an offer of $2.5 million for the documentary, which Hersh and Obenhaus accepted. (Note: $2.5 million in 1996 equates to approximately $5,132,000 in 2025, according to calculations based on the United States Consumer Price Index measure of inflation.)

== Uncovering the forgeries ==
Evidence of technology that post-dated the papers: Top: use of "lift-off" type to adjust a spelling error in Kennedy's name. Bottom: a broken line can be seen underneath part of Monroe's signature.

While NBC was still involved in the documentary, Obenhaus had been employing text specialists to verify the documents; no errors had been located. After ABC became involved, he continued to use experts in different fields, including those versed in fingerprint and handwriting analysis, and in the microscopic examination of the typewritten material. There was no trace of Kennedy's fingerprints on any of the documents tested, although "after so many years, fingerprints might have worn off", according to Robert Sam Anson, of Vanity Fair. In May 1997, a member of Obenhaus's research team noticed that two of the letters, purportedly written in Kennedy's hand, but on Cusack Jr.'s office notepaper, showed the address with a ZIP Code. The documents were dated 1961 and 1962; the researcher knew that ZIP Codes were not introduced until April 1963, and so the code could not have been available on that date. When asked, Cusack suggested the documents had been backdated, which seemed to satisfy Hersh and Obenhaus, although the verification process continued.

Hersh began to ask several Kennedy associates about the connection between the president and Cusack Jr. These included Janet Des Rosiers, one of Kennedy's former secretaries, whose name appears in the papers; she denied that she had ever seen Monroe and also stated that what was supposed to be her own signature in the documents was not, in fact, hers. No associates had any knowledge of a connection between the two men or had previously heard of Cusack Jr. In mid-1997, the microscopic analysis results were shown to Hersh and Obenhaus. They showed that many of the documents were printed on an IBM Selectric typewriter with a Prestige Pica font typeball, which was unavailable until 1973, ten years after Kennedy's death. The documents also showed evidence of the use of "lift-off" type to adjust a spelling error in Kennedy's name, which was not possible in the 1960s. Another flaw was that the "y" in Monroe's signature had removed a tiny fragment of the typed line below; this was only possible with more modern plastic typewriter ribbons, which were not available in the early 1960s. Kenneth Rendell, an expert in historical documents, initially stated that the papers were genuine, although this was based upon a sample of only three documents. In a retrospective analysis, he considered that "the complete lack of change in the handwriting" showed the documents were forgeries. Another clue was that Kennedy's handwriting was irregular and inconsistent – to the point that his wife's relative, Gore Vidal, described it as "a sort of vigorous 9-year-old valiantly combating dyslexia" – while Rendell identifies that in the forgeries:

Every page has the same inconsistencies, and that doesn't happen. For example, when Kennedy would finish off a final letter "t" he would sometimes make it big, sometimes small, and sometimes it ends with an outrageous flourish. But all the "t"s here had the same flourish, page after page.

As soon as it became clear in July 1997 that the documents were forgeries, Hersh wanted the news spread widely to ensure no-one else was fooled by them, and to make certain he was not legally liable for their promotion. He removed one of the chapters from The Dark Side of Camelot and deleted all references to the forged documents throughout the book. ABC, following legal advice, decided to cancel the documentary project and, instead, to interview Cusack and Cloud for an exposé. On September 25, 1997, ABC broadcast an edition of their 20/20 news program about the forgeries. Interviewed by journalist Peter Jennings, a visibly sweating Cusack was confronted with the news about the irregularities in the papers; ABC did not tell him in advance that they knew the documents were forgeries. Jennings asked him if he had forged the papers: Cusack responded that he had not. Cusack claimed that the documents may have been copies of earlier originals. The same day, stories of the forged nature of the documents were being reported in the press. Hersh was quoted in The Washington Post: "That's journalism. ... I'm sorry if people want to magnify and dramatize. ... Big deal." Cusack complained to The New York Times that he did not know he was going to be asked about the documents; ABC told the newspaper that not only did Cusack know he was going to be asked about them, he was a paid consultant for the program. Cusack was then investigated by a federal grand jury. In response to the claims of forgery, that November, Cusack, his wife, and Cloud brought lawsuits against ABC, Jennings, Hersh, and several other media outlets for 16 civil claims, including fraud, libel, breach of contract, and intentional infliction of emotional distress.

== Arrest and trial ==
On March 17, 1998, Cusack was arrested on thirteen charges of mail and wire fraud. An investigation showed that he had spent the money he received from the sale of the forgeries on two large houses (a $1.3 million home in Southport, Connecticut, and a $540,000 weekend house in Southampton, New York), clothing, and eleven cars. (Note: $1.3 million in 1998 equates to approximately $2,568,000 and $540,000 equates to approximately $1,067,000 in 2025, according to calculations based on the United States Consumer Price Index measure of inflation.) The indictment stated that investigators had found a notebook containing a handwritten draft of one of the forged documents, written in Cusack's handwriting. (Note: The notebook also contained practice signatures of other historical figures, including George Washington, Thomas Jefferson, and Andrew Jackson.)

Cusack's trial began on April 14, 1999, and ended on April 30; he was convicted on all thirteen charges by a jury. That September he was sentenced to nine years and seven months in federal prison and ordered to repay $7 million in restitution to those who had purchased the documents.

== Aftermath ==
Cusack and Cloud's action against ABC and others had been paused while the criminal case proceeded. When that ended, their federal claim was withdrawn, although a different defamation action continued in a state court. In June 2001, this claim was denied by the court. Cusack appealed his criminal conviction; the conviction was affirmed on October 13, 2000. In 2001, he filed for a writ of habeas corpus but this was denied; the opinion stated: "The petitioner has not made a substantial showing of a denial of a federal right and appellate review is, therefore, not warranted."

Despite the evidence that the papers were forgeries, several of those who had bought the papers wanted to keep their copies. Mike Stern – one of the collectors, who had paid $300,000 (Note: $300,000 in 1999 equates to approximately $580,000 in 2025, according to calculations based on the United States Consumer Price Index measure of inflation.) – said: "We paid for them, we're entitled to them. Stamp them with the word 'forgery' if you have to, but we want to hang them on our walls even if they are fake."

== See also ==
- Killian documents authenticity issues – Clues to forgery in a 2004 political controversy
- Hitler Diaries – Forged journals purportedly by Adolf Hitler

== Notes and references ==
=== Sources ===
==== Books ====
- Churchwell, Sarah (2004). The Many Lives of Marilyn Monroe. Granta Books. ISBN 978-0-3124-2565-4.
- Dallek, Robert (2015). An Unfinished Life: John F. Kennedy 1917–1963. Newtown, Connecticut: American Political Biography Press. ISBN 978-0-9457-0743-1.
- Hersh, Seymour M. (2018). Reporter: A Memoir. New York: Alfred A. Knopf. ISBN 978-0-3072-6395-7.
- Katsoulis, Melissa (2009). Literary Hoaxes: An Eye-opening History of Famous Frauds. New York: Skyhorse. ISBN 978-1-6023-9794-1.
- Kohn, George Childs (2001). The New Encyclopedia of American Scandal. New York: Facts on File. ISBN 978-0-8160-4225-8.
- Losure, Bob (1998). Five Seconds to Air: Broadcast Journalism Behind the Scenes. Franklin, Tennessee: Hillsboro Press. ISBN 978-1-5773-6107-7.
- Miraldi, Robert (2013). Seymour Hersh: Scoop Artist. Lincoln, Nebraska: Potomac Books. ISBN 978-1-6123-4475-1.
- Quirk, Lawrence J. (2004). The Kennedys in Hollywood. New York: Cooper Square Press. ISBN 978-0-8154-1296-0.
- Reeves, Richard (1993). President Kennedy: Profile of Power. New York: Simon & Schuster. ISBN 978-0-6716-4879-4.
- Spoto, Donald (2001). Marilyn Monroe: The Biography. New York: Cooper Square Press. ISBN 978-0-8154-1183-3.

==== Judicial opinions ====
- Cloud v. ABC, Inc., 97 Civ. 8702 (JSM) (United States District Court, S.D. New York December 17, 2001), archived from the original on May 6, 2024.
- Cusack v. US, 00 CIV 8480 (DLC) (United States District Court, S.D. New York December 7, 2001), archived from the original on May 5, 2024.
- United States of America v. Lawrence X. Cusack, 229 F.3d 344 (United States Court of Appeals for the Second Circuit October 13, 2000), archived from the original on May 6, 2024.

==== Inflation calculations ====
- 1634–1699: McCusker, John J. (January 1996a). "How Much Is That in Real Money? A Historical Price Index for Use as a Deflator of Money Values in the Economy of the United States: Addenda et Corrigenda" (PDF). Proceedings of the American Antiquarian Society. 106 (2): 327–334.
- 1700–1799: McCusker, John J. (October 1996b). "How Much Is That in Real Money? A Historical Price Index for Use as a Deflator of Money Values in the Economy of the United States" (PDF). American Antiquarian Society. 106 (2): 327–334.
- 1800–present: "Consumer Price Index, 1800–". Federal Reserve Bank of Minneapolis.

==== Journals ====
- Billington, Monroe (January 1, 1987). "President Lyndon B. Johnson and the Separation of Church and State". Journal of Church and State. 29 (1): 101–111. doi:10.1093/jcs/29.1.101.
- Cusack, Lawrence X. (November 26, 1977). "Another Point of View – Lawyer Advertising and the Future of the Legal Profession". The Journal. 48 (44). Oklahoma Bar Association: 2609–2610.
- Hughes, Rod (July 1999). "Cashing in on Camelot". Legal Assistant Today. 16 (6): 15.
- "Presbyterians on Church and State". Church & State. 16 (7): 3. July–August 1963.

==== Magazines ====
- Anson, Robert Sam (November 1997). "Secrets and Lies". Vanity Fair. No. 447. pp. 96–122.
- Cockburn, Alexander (October 20, 1997). "The Myth of Fingerprints". The Nation. No. 265. p. 8.
- Frank, Reuven (November 3, 1997). "Documenting the Documentary". The New Leader. Vol. 80, no. 17. pp. 20–21.
- Samuels, David (November 3, 1997). "Fakes: Who forged the JFK–Marilyn Monroe Papers?". The New Yorker. Vol. 73, no. 33. pp. 62–75.
- Weinberg, Steve (November 1997). "Attacks on Style and Substance". The IRE Journal. 20 (6): 6–15.

==== News ====
- Carter, Bill (September 25, 1997). "ABC Says Documents on Kennedy Were Faked". The New York Times. p. 26.
- "CBS Defamation Claim Dismissed". The Journal News. June 28, 2001. p. 38.
- Grove, Lloyd (September 25, 1997a). "Incendiary JFK Story Goes up in Smoke". The Washington Post.
- Grove, Lloyd (October 26, 1997b). "Was the Writing on the Wall?". The Washington Post.
- Grove, Lloyd (November 22, 1997c). "ABC, Hersh Sued Over 'JFK' Papers; Document Sellers Charge Fraud, Libel". The Washington Post. p. 1.
- Harden, Blaine (March 17, 1998). "'JFK Papers' Figure Charged With Mail Fraud; Ex- Paralegal Accused of Forging, Selling Documents on Marilyn Monroe Hush Fund". The Washington Post. p. 2.
- Hurtado, Patricia (September 18, 1999). "Man Convicted of Selling Forged Papers". Newsday. p. 8.
- "Lawrence X. Cusack". The New York Times. October 29, 1985. Section D, Page 27. Archived from the original on April 16, 2024.
- "Man Accused of Forging Letters by JFK, Monroe". Chicago Tribune. March 17, 1998. p. 8.
- "Man Convicted of Sale of Kennedy Forgeries". The Washington Post. May 1, 1999. p. 2.
- "Miss Rush Wed to L. X. Cusack". The New York Times. December 8, 1991. Section 1, Page 80.
- Schwartzman, Paul (October 26, 1997). "Sex, Lies and Trail of Debt Document Pusher Savors High Life, but has Problem Paying his Way". New York Daily News. p. 13. Archived from the original on May 24, 2024.
- "Seller Guilty in Kennedy Forgery Case". Los Angeles Times. May 1, 1999. p. 9A.
- Thomas, Evan; Hosenball, Mark (October 6, 1997). "The JFK-Marilyn hoax". Newsweek. Vol. 130, no. 14. pp. 24–26.
- "Trial Begins Over Forged JFK Papers". The Chicago Tribune. April 15, 1999. p. 22.
- Weiser, Benjamin (September 18, 1999). "Kennedy Papers' Forger Sentenced to 9 Years". The New York Times. p. 3.
- Winship, Frederick M. (August 7, 1996). "Kennedy Book War Heats Up". United Press International.
- Zoglin, Richard (October 6, 1997). "The Marilyn Papers". Time.
