= Ari Ben-Menashe =

Israeli-Canadian arms dealer (b. 1951)

- ארי בן מנשה
- Born: 4 December 1951 (age 74); Tehran, Iran
- Citizenship: Israel, Canada
- Occupations: Aman agent, Political and intelligence consultant, author and speaker, businessman and arms dealer

Ari Ben-Menashe (Hebrew: ארי בן מנשה; born 4 December 1951) is an Israeli-Canadian businessman, security consultant, and author. He was previously an employee of Israel's Military Intelligence Directorate from 1977 to 1987, and an arms dealer. He lives in Montreal.

== Biography ==
Ari Ben-Menashe was born in Tehran, Iran. His parents, Khatoun and Gourdji Ben-Menashe, were Iraqi Jews who settled in Tehran in 1945. His father ran an import-export business and held the sales rights for Mercedes-Benz/Bosch car and spare parts in Iran. He has three sisters. At the age of 14, he immigrated to Israel and attended an English-language school north of Tel Aviv. He then studied political science and modern history at Bar Ilan University and became an Israeli citizen in 1973. He served in the Israel Defense Forces in signals intelligence from 1974 to 1977 as part of his mandatory military service.

In December 1991, Ben-Menashe left Australia and settled in Canada. In 1993 he married a Canadian woman and moved to Montreal; three years later he gained Canadian citizenship.

== Intelligence career ==
=== Israeli Intelligence ===
In 1977, Ben-Menashe joined Israel's Military Intelligence Directorate in the External Relations Department as a civilian. He later said, "I happened to be the right guy at the right time. I spoke Persian, Arabic, English. I knew the United States." In his 1992 book Profits of War: Inside the Secret U.S.-Israeli Arms Network, Ben-Menashe said that following the 1979 Iranian Revolution, his Iranian background provided useful connections, with some of his school friends playing roles in the new government. These connections led to an intermediary role in the Israeli effort to sell arms to Iran.

Ben-Menashe served in the Military Intelligence Directorate until 1987, though as a civilian for many years. He has stated that he was never a spy and "was never undercover or anything of that nature."

In September 1986, Ben-Menashe shared information with Time correspondent Raji Samghabadi about the weapons shipments to Iran organized by Richard Secord, Oliver North and Albert Hakim, later known as the Iran–Contra affair. A number of officials, including North, were indicted for their role in the weapons shipments. When Ben-Menashe revealed the as-of-then unproven story to Time, they would not publish it. Ben-Menashe later passed the information to the Lebanese Ash-Shiraa, which published it on 3 November 1986 and soon led to congressional investigations. Samghabadi later said, "The information he gave me was earthshaking, and it was later corroborated by Congress." Congress, however, described Ben-Menashe's testimony in their investigation as "not credible".

=== Zimbabwe ===
In 2002, Ben-Menashe alleged that Morgan Tsvangirai, the leader of Zimbabwe's opposition party (the Movement for Democratic Change) had asked him to help "eliminate" President Robert Mugabe. Ben-Menashe produced a videotape of conversations with Tsvangirai in London and Montreal, where the latter asked for Ben-Menashe's help as a political consultant. Unknown to Tsvangirai, Ben-Menashe's Montreal consultancy firm at the time, Dickens and Madson, was working for Mugabe, and tapes of the conversation were passed to the Zimbabwean authorities, which charged Tsvangirai with treason.

Tsvangirai was tried before the Harare High Court, but exonerated in October 2004 on the grounds that the "eliminate" did not mean he wanted Mugabe assassinated. Judge Paddington Garwe described Ben-Menashe, who was the prosecution's star witness, as "rude, unreliable, and contemptuous."

Ben-Menashe was hired by Paul Le Roux, an international drug lord and DEA informant born in the former Rhodesia to lobby the Zimbabwe government to grant leases to Zimbabwean farmlands. The lands would then be subleased to white farmers dislodged by previous land reform in Zimbabwe. Ben-Menashe received more than US$14 million from Le-Roux.

=== Sudan ===
Ben-Menashe's Montreal based lobbying firm was hired by Sudanese General Mohamed Hamdan Dagalo in a $6 million deal. The firm, Dickens & Madson Inc, signed a deal offering to seek government recognition, funding, and "striving to obtain funding and equipment for the Sudanese military" with General Dagalo. Dagalo's forces carried out the Khartoum massacre, in which more than 100 protesters were killed.

=== Myanmar ===
Ben-Menashe was also hired by Tatmadaw – the military junta ruling Myanmar following the 2021 Myanmar coup d'état – pushing unverified claims that the goal of the coup was to move Myanmar out of China's orbit in an attempt to rebrand the globally condemned regime.

== Public claims ==
In 1990 and 1991, Ben-Menashe said that he had been personally involved in Iran in order to assist the Reagan's presidential campaign with its October surprise of preventing the American hostages from being released before the 1980 election. He also gave Seymour Hersh information about Israel's nuclear program, which was published in Hersh's book The Samson Option. Ben-Menashe then fled to Australia and, in his application for refugee status, declared himself a victim of persecution of the Israeli and U.S. governments. For his return to the U.S. in May 1991 to testify to Congress, the journalist Robert Parry received a tip from an intelligence source that the U.S. was planning to divert Ben-Menashe to Israel, where Ben-Menashe feared that he would be charged for revealing official secrets. With a delay to Ben-Menashe's flight, congressional investigators were able to extract assurances from the U.S. government.

Ben-Menashe claimed that Robert Maxwell was a Mossad agent and he had tipped off the Israeli embassy in 1986 about the Israeli nuclear technician Mordechai Vanunu after Vanunu and a friend approached the Sunday Mirror and The Sunday Times in London with a story about Israel's nuclear capability. Vanunu was subsequently lured by Mossad to Rome, kidnapped, returned to Israel, and sentenced to 18 years in jail. According to Ben-Menashe, the Daily Mirror's foreign editor, Nicholas Davies, worked for the Mossad and was involved in the Vanunu affair. No British newspaper would publish the Maxwell allegations, because of his litigious reputation. However, Ben-Menashe was used as a key source by The New York Times journalist Seymour Hersh for his book about Israel's nuclear weapons, The Samson Option: Israel's Nuclear Arsenal and American Foreign Policy, published in Britain in 1991 by Faber and Faber. Hersh included the allegations about Maxwell, Davies, and Vanunu in the book. Davies's former wife, Janet Fielding, also confirmed in the book that she knew Ben-Menashe was an Israeli intelligence operative and that Menashe and Davies were business partners in an arms company, which was involved in the sale of arms for Israel to Iran during the Iran–Iraq War. When Hersh asked Fielding whether she knew Ben-Menashe was an Israeli intelligence operative, she responded, "It wasn't difficult to put two and two together. Do you think I'm bloody stupid? I shut my ears and walked [out of the marriage with Davies]." On November 5, 1991, Maxwell fell from his yacht, the Lady Ghislaine. Ben-Menashe claimed that Maxwell had been assassinated by Mossad for trying to blackmail it.

On October 21, 1991, two Members of Parliament, Labour MP George Galloway and Conservative MP Rupert Allason, agreed to raise the issue in the House of Commons, which enabled newspapers to claim parliamentary privilege and to report the allegations. Davies was fired from the Daily Mirror for gross misconduct. Maxwell issued a writ for libel against Faber and Faber as well as Hersh and allegedly told Davies that the Mirror editor had threatened to resign if Davies was not fired but that he would get his job back when the dust settled.

Ben-Menashe featured prominently on the podcast "Chasing Ghislaine", in which reporter Vicky Ward spoke to him about Jeffrey Epstein's connections and work. He alleged repeatedly during the programme that Epstein was an agent for Mossad, specialising in blackmail work and entrapment. He also alleged that Ghislaine's father, Robert Maxwell, had been connected to Mossad. He said Israeli intelligence had compromising images of powerful men.

== Literary career ==
In 1992, Ben-Menashe published a book about his involvement in the Iran–Contra Affair and intelligence operations on behalf of Israeli intelligence in Profits of War: Inside the Secret U.S.–Israeli Arms Network. Rafi Eitan, Israeli spy and Begin's counter-terrorism advisor, told author Gordon Thomas that Eitan had worked with Ben-Menashe on setting up the US–Israeli network for covertly supplying arms to Iran and had collaborated with Ben-Menashe on using Prosecutor's Management Information System (PROMIS) for espionage.

On November 12, Matthew Evans, chairman of Faber and Faber, called a press conference in London to say he had evidence that Ben-Menashe was telling the truth about Davies. Evans read out a statement from Hersh, who said he had documentation showing meetings between Davies, unnamed Mossad officers, and "Cindy" (Cheryl Bentov), the woman who lured Vanunu to Rome. Evans and Hersh were later shown to have themselves been the subject of a sting operation by Joe Flynn, Fleet Street's most celebrated con man. Evans had met Flynn in Amsterdam and paid him £1,200 for the forged documents.

Ben-Menashe testified in 1991 that he had personally witnessed George H.W. Bush attend a meeting with members of the Iranian government in Paris in October 1980, as part of a covert Republican Party operation to have the 52 U.S. hostages held in Iran remain there until President Jimmy Carter, who was negotiating their release, had lost the 1980 presidential election to Ronald Reagan (1980 October Surprise theory). Time called him a "spinner of tangled yarns".

== Controversy ==
In November 1989, Ben-Menashe was arrested in the United States for violating the Arms Export Control Act for allegedly trying to sell three Lockheed C-130 Hercules transport aircraft to Iran using false end-user certificates. Ben-Menashe claimed that the Israeli government offered him a plea bargain.

In March 1990, The Jerusalem Post reported that "the Defence establishment 'never had any contacts with Ari Ben-Menashe and his activities.'" The claims were dropped after Ben-Menashe provided Newsweek's Robert Parry with employment references from Israeli intelligence sources. After almost a year in prison, he was acquitted on 28 November 1990, with a jury accepting that he had acted on behalf of Israel. During his trial, Ben-Menashe's passport was presented as another piece of evidence that he was more than just a low-level Persian translator for the Israeli Defense Forces. The passport documented travel all over the world including Peru, Chile, Guatemala, and multiple points in Asia and Europe. Ben-Menashe's lawyer asked the jury rhetorically, "They need a Persian translator in Chile?" He then stated, "That doesn't make any sense." Former Time correspondent Raji Samghabadi, to whom Ben-Menashe had given details on the Iran–Contra affair before they became public, proved a key defense witness. Samghabadi testified that Ben-Menashe had told him about the U.S. and Israeli arms deals, which would become the foundation of the Iran–Contra Affair, several months before the story broke in the Lebanese newspaper Ash-Shiraa, which indicated that he had high-level inside knowledge of Israeli affairs.

In early 1991, after returning from Israel, The New Republic's Steven Emerson described Ben-Menashe as a "low-level translator" although references had said he was working in "key positions" and handling "complex and sensitive assignments." Parry later wrote that other documents confirmed Ben-Menashe's travels: "Ben-Menashe's passports and other documents revealed that he had traveled extensively with frequent trips to Latin America, Eastern Europe, the United States and elsewhere, not exactly the record of the stay-at-home, low-level translator that Israel was trying to sell to me and other journalists." In 1992, Moshe Hebroni, deputy director of the Military Intelligence Directorate, told Craig Unger that Ben-Menashe had worked directly with him and had access to sensitive material.

=== 2002 arrest ===
Ben-Menashe moved to Sydney, Australia, in 1992, then to Montreal, Quebec, Canada, where he married a Canadian woman and became a citizen. He was arrested in 2002 during acrimonious divorce proceedings and charged with assault, following complaints by his wife and mother-in-law, but he was subsequently acquitted.

Documents obtained in 2002 by Canadian journalists under Canada's freedom of information legislation show that Ben-Menashe had a relationship with the Canadian government: "over 400 pages showing Ben-Menashe was regularly de-briefed by Canadian intelligence officers, plumbed about what he knew of the inner workings of the governments he was involved with."

=== Firebombing ===
In December 2012, Ben-Menashe's home in Montreal was badly damaged by a firebomb. According to the National Post, Ben-Menashe suggested, "Someone had been out to get him."

== Published works ==
- Ari Ben-Menashe: Profits of War: Inside the Secret U.S.-Israeli Arms Network, New York, Sheridan Square Press 1992 (USA) ISBN 1-879823-01-2. (First published 23 October 1992 by Allen & Unwin Australia Pty Ltd)
