= Nicholas Davies (journalist) =

British journalist and writer (1936–2016)

- Born: 14 March 1937
- Died: 28 January 2016 (aged 78)
- Occupations: Journalist, writer, arms dealer
- Spouse(s): Unknown (divorced) Janet Fielding (m. 1982; div. 1991) Andrea Martin (m. 1992)
- Writing career
- Period: 1961–2016
- Genres: Journalism, biography
- Notable works: Diana: A Princess and Her Troubled Marriage (1992); Death of a Tycoon (1993); Dead Men Talking (2003)

Nicholas Alan Francis Benedict Davies (14 March 1937 – 28 January 2016), also known as Nick Davies, was a journalist and author, formerly foreign editor of the Daily Mirror. He was closely associated with Robert Maxwell, and was the centre of considerable UK media attention in 1991 after he was accused in Seymour Hersh's book The Samson Option of involvement in Israeli arms deals and of passing the location of Mordechai Vanunu to the Mossad. In response, Maxwell and Davies sued for libel and Hersh and his publisher, Faber & Faber counter-sued. Maxwell's suit ended when he died and Davies did not pursue the case. The two suits were resolved when the Mirror Group apologised to Hersh and paid substantial damages on behalf of Maxwell after Maxwell's death.

== Journalistic career ==
Davies began his career with the Birmingham Post and Mail, and joined Mirror Group Newspapers in 1961 as a foreign correspondent and investigative reporter. He served as foreign editor of the Daily Mirror for 14 years until he was sacked by Maxwell in 1991. Davies later went on to publish stories and a book about working with Maxwell, as well as books about the British royal family and Northern Ireland.

Davies was the first in the mass media to identify the victim of the 2007 royal blackmail plot, despite a court order preventing the person being named in the United Kingdom. His book on Maxwell was entitled Death of a Tycoon: An Insider's Account of the Rise and Fall of Robert Maxwell. In it he speculated that Maxwell had been killed, but also found that Maxwell may have committed suicide.

He was referred to as "Kite" by the satirical magazine Private Eye, because his stories were supposed to be "fliers". He has been confused with another British journalist of the same name when they were working in the same building.

== Arms sales ==
Davies was named by Ari Ben-Menashe as his business partner in Profits of War, in relation to Iran–Contra and the sale of PROMIS, the first computer spyware. The arrangement was also noted in the book Robert Maxwell, Israel's Superspy: The Life and Murder of a Media Mogul by Gordon Thomas. Ben-Menashe later posted seven documents relating to sales of arms by Davies, sometimes signing himself as Davis. Ben-Menashe also stated Davies was a "major player" in the arms sales to Iran and made more than $1.5 million on one deal. Davies and Ben-Menashe were specifically business partners in the international arms firm Ora Limited, which operated out of Davies' home in London starting in 1983. Ora Limited was set up according to Ben-Menashe with approval of the Israeli government and was meant to facilitate the Israeli flow of arms to Iran during the Iran–Iraq War.

Davies' former wife, Janet Fielding, confirmed that Davies was selling arms in partnership with Ben-Menashe. In an interview with Seymour Hersh, she stated "Nick would try to tell me stuff [about the arms sales] and I said I didn't want to know. I left him because of it." She also stated that she was aware that his arms sales partner Ben-Menashe was an Israeli intelligence operative.

== Personal life ==
In a 1992 article for The Washington Post, Christopher Hitchens describes Davies as a "polo-playing friend of Prince Charles".

From 1982 to 1991, he was married to the Australian actress Janet Fielding, best known for playing the Fourth and Fifth Doctor's companion Tegan Jovanka in Doctor Who.

There are some details of his personal life in his books The Unknown Maxwell, in which he revealed his own affair with Maxwell's secretary, and Death of a Tycoon: An Insider's Account of the Rise and Fall of Robert Maxwell.

== Bibliography ==
- The Unknown Maxwell: His Astonishing Secret Lives Revealed by His Aide and Close Companion (1992), Sidgwick & Jackson.
- Death of a Tycoon (1992), ISBN 978-0-312-09249-8
- Diana: A Princess and Her Troubled marriage (1992), Birch Lane Press, ISBN 1-55972-156-1
- Queen Elizabeth II (1994)
- Roll of the Dice (1996), Darius Guppy with Nicholas Davies
- Fifty Dead Men Walking (1997)
- Ten-Thirty-Three (1999)
- Dead Men Talking (2003)
- Diana: The Killing of a Princess (2006)
