= The Dark Side of Camelot =

1997 book

- Author: Seymour M. Hersh
- Language: English
- Publisher: Little, Brown and Company
- Publication date: 1997

The Dark Side of Camelot is a 1997 book by investigative journalist Seymour M. Hersh, published by Little, Brown and Company. It presents a critical portrait of John F. Kennedy, alleging misconduct in his personal life, corrupt political practices, and secret operations during his presidency.

== Content ==
Hersh's book makes a number of explosive allegations about Kennedy, including that he had extramarital affairs arranged by the United States Secret Service, that Kennedy's father secured the help of the Chicago Outfit to help win the 1960 presidential election, used Judith Exner as a courier to deliver money to mob boss Sam Giancana, and approved covert plots to assassinate Fidel Castro.

Secret Service agents interviewed by Hersh described JFK’s private behavior. One agent said there was “always a skirt.” Another remembered being told to retrieve compromising photographs from a Seattle photographer: “There was a picture of Kennedy standing with a drink in one hand and his arm around a naked woman.”

=== Document hoax ===
Prior to publication, Hersh removed a chapter based on documents provided by forger Lex Cusack, which purported to show a hush money agreement between Kennedy and Marilyn Monroe. Forensic journalists at ABC and The Washington Post found clear anachronisms in the documents, including ZIP codes and typefaces that did not exist in the early 1960s. The Washington Post described the affair as "The strange and twisted saga of the JFK file is part cautionary tale, part slapstick farce, a story of deception and self-delusion in the service of commerce and journalism."

== Reception ==
Journalist Edward Jay Epstein of the Los Angeles Times wrote: "Much of what is new ... cannot be substantiated ... When the pretensions of ‘helping the nation reclaim some of its history’ fade ... this book turns out to be, alas, more about the deficiencies of investigative journalism than about the deficiencies of John F. Kennedy."

In a more nuanced review for The New York Times, Thomas Powers described the book as “a reporter’s book, not a historian’s,” acknowledging that Hersh “has done his legwork.” But he wrote, "The problem is not that Hersh has found nothing worth knowing but that everything he finds is used to prove Kennedy was wrong — not merely mistaken but corrupt, venal, selfish, untrustworthy, even traitorous." In The Independent, David Usborne acknowledged Hersh’s boldness and reach: "This was a book for which the omens could not have been more promising… After five years of research, Hersh offers a gaudy canvas of Kennedy sleaze over some 450 pages." While also noting the backlash, Usborne commented: "The reception has been astonishing; astonishing in its vitriol."

In a strongly negative review for The Washington Post, critic Jonathan Yardley wrote: "This is a book based largely on personal testimony as given to Hersh in interviews ... Hersh too often relies on the word of people who were peripheral to the main action ... It is a patchwork of conspiracy theories, third-hand rumors, wild conjecture and anecdotal evidence," adding, "It is gossip—much of it malicious and/or mere hearsay—parading as investigative journalism."

== Legacy ==
The Dark Side of Camelot became a bestseller and stirred widespread controversy. The forgery scandal overshadowed some of its more substantiated claims, and the book remains an example of the risks associated with investigative journalism based on unverifiable sources. A 2018 retrospective in The Washington Post noted: "The Dark Side of Camelot was a big bestseller but was savaged by critics."

== See also ==
- Bibliography of John F. Kennedy
- Judith Exner
- John F. Kennedy document hoax
