= The Samson Option: Israel's Nuclear Arsenal and American Foreign Policy =

1991 nonfiction book by Seymour Hersh

The Samson Option
- Author: Seymour Hersh
- Language: English
- Genre: Non-fiction
- Publisher: Random House
- Publication date: 1991
- Publication place: United States
- Media type: Print (Hardback)
- Pages: 362 pp
- ISBN: 0-394-57006-5
- OCLC: 24609770
- Dewey Decimal: 355.8/25119/095694 20
- LC Class: UA853.I8 H47 1991

The Samson Option: Israel's Nuclear Arsenal and American Foreign Policy is a 1991 book by Seymour Hersh. It details the history of Israel's nuclear weapons program and its effects on Israel-American relations. The "Samson Option" of the book's title refers to the nuclear strategy whereby Israel would launch a massive nuclear retaliatory strike if the state itself was being overrun, just as the Biblical figure Samson is said to have pushed apart the pillars of a Philistine temple, bringing down the roof and killing himself and thousands of Philistines who had gathered to see him humiliated.

According to The New York Times, Hersh relied on Ari Ben-Menashe, a former Israeli government employee who says he worked for Israeli intelligence, for much of his information on the state of the Israeli nuclear program. Hersh did not travel to Israel to conduct interviews for the book, believing that he might have been subject to the Israeli Military Censor. Nevertheless, he did interview Israelis in the United States and Europe during his three years of research.

== Contents ==
=== Revelations and allegations ===
Publisher Random House says, on the flaps of the dust jacket, that The Samson Option "reveals many startling events," among them:

- How Israel stole United States satellite reconnaissance intelligence and used it to target the Soviet Union.
- How Israeli Prime Minister Yitzhak Shamir directed that some of the intelligence stolen by American Jonathan Pollard, who spied for Israel, be turned over to the Soviet Union.
- How Israel created a false control room at the Dimona nuclear facility to hide from American nuclear inspectors its use in creating nuclear weapons.
- How President Dwight Eisenhower’s administration tried and failed to force Israel to acknowledge its nuclear ambitions.
- How Israel threatened to use nuclear weapons on the third day of the 1973 Yom Kippur War, blackmailing U.S. President Richard Nixon into airlifting military supplies.
- How Israel used a top London newspaper editor to capture Mordechai Vanunu.
- How a top American Democratic Party fund-raiser influenced the White House while raising money for the Israeli bomb.
- How American intelligence finally learned the truth about Dimona.

The American Library Association book review lists additional "significant revelations" in the book:

- Fuller details about the Israeli bombing of the Iraqi nuclear facility in 1981.
- That Israel collaborated with South Africa on a nuclear test over the Indian Ocean in 1979.
- That during the 1991 Gulf War Israel pointed nuclear armed mobile missiles at Iraq.
- That Israel holds a few neutron bombs in addition to several hundred other nuclear weapons.
- That U.S. policy towards Israel's nuclear program "was not just one of benign neglect: it was a conscious policy of ignoring reality."

The New Scientist book review lists specific examples of U.S. official's suppression of information:

- CIA analysts kept quiet about what they found in Lockheed U-2 spy plane photographs of Dimona during the 1950s.
- Lewis Strauss, chairman of the Atomic Energy Commission during the 1950s, probably knew about and supported the Israeli nuclear weapons program.

The review also notes the revelation that U.S. President John F. Kennedy attempted to persuade Israel to abandon its nuclear program, and angry notes were exchanged between Kennedy and Israeli Premier David Ben-Gurion in 1963.

Other allegations in The Samson Option include:

- The U.S. did not understand that Israel saw the Soviet Union as its number one threat; that even before he became President Nixon's National Security Advisor, Henry Kissinger had told Israeli leaders that the U.S. would not help Israel if the Soviets attacked it; that Israeli missiles targeted the Soviet Union from 1971 on; that the Soviets had added four Israeli cities to their target list; that the Soviets had threatened Israel after the 1973 war because Israel kept breaking ceasefires with Egypt.
- The White House under Kennedy was "fixated" upon what to do about Israel's nuclear weapons. However, none of the prominent Kennedy biographers, including Arthur Schlesinger and Theodore C. Sorensen mentioned the fact.
- In December 1960 U.S. Atomic Energy Commission chairman John A. McCone revealed Central Intelligence Agency (CIA) information about Israel's Dimona nuclear weapons plant to the New York Times. Hersh writes that Kennedy appointed McCone Director of Central Intelligence in part because of his willingness to deal with Israeli and other nuclear issues - and despite the fact that McCone was a Republican. McCone resigned as director in 1965, feeling unappreciated by President Lyndon B. Johnson, who he complained would not read his reports, including on the need for full-fledged inspections of Israeli nuclear facilities.
- President Johnson suppressed the January, 1965 Gilpatric report, which called for tough anti-nuclear proliferation efforts, including against Israel, because he feared backlash from American Jews. In June 1965 Senator Robert F. Kennedy publicly called for many of the report's recommendations, invoking his assassinated brother's name, thus provoking Johnson to further bury the report.
- Hersh alleges that the Soviets learned about and communicated to Egyptian President Anwar Sadat Israeli threats to use the Samson Option in the 1973 war.
- Menachem Begin’s conservative party coalition, which took power in 1977, was more committed to “the Samson Option and the necessity for an Israeli nuclear arsenal” than the Labor Party. Rather than merely react to attack, they intended to “use Israeli might to redraw the political map of the Middle East.” Begin, who hated the Soviet Union, immediately targeted more Soviet cities with nuclear weapons.
- Hersh includes two quotations from Israeli leaders. He writes that a "former Israeli government official" with "first hand knowledge of his government’s nuclear weapons program" told him: "We can still remember the smell of Auschwitz and Treblinka. Next time we’ll take all of you with us." And he quotes then Israeli defense minister Ariel Sharon as saying: "We are much more important than (Americans) think. We can take the Middle East with us whenever we go."

== Critical reception ==
Yale professor Gaddis Smith reviewed the book for Foreign Affairs, calling it a "fascinating work of investigative history" that succeeded in sifting "hard fact from the decade's rumors and half-confirmed reports" on the Israeli program. New Scientist's review stated that the book "breaks new ground" by revealing that "US officials helped to suppress the information they gathered on Dimona," i.e., Israel's Negev Nuclear Research Center. The book spent three weeks on Publishers Weekly's bestseller list.

The Jerusalem Report, while acknowledging Israel's nuclear program and the existence of the Samson Option, said the book was "yet another pretentious, self-serving and therefore unreliable effort to stir up a controversy for its own sake and make a fast buck." Scott Berrie of the Council on Foreign Relations wrote, "most of Hersh's findings are based not on solid evidence or documentation, but on recent interviews about events that took place more than thirty years ago."

== Controversies ==
=== Spy allegation ===
Hersh stated in The Samson Option that the foreign editor of the British Daily Mirror, Nicholas Davies, told the Mossad in 1986 the name of the hotel in which Israeli nuclear technician Mordechai Vanunu was hiding. Vanunu was in the process of revealing information on the Israeli nuclear program to The Sunday Times, but was subsequently kidnapped and smuggled to Israel by the Mossad. Hersh further stated that Davies was involved in Israeli arms sales, and that his boss Robert Maxwell also had ties to the Mossad. He received this information from Ben-Menashe and from Janet Fielding, Davies' former wife.

Davies and Maxwell rejected the allegations, calling them "a complete and total lie" and a "ludicrous, a total invention" respectively. On October 23, 1991 they filed a libel suit against the book's British publisher, Faber & Faber Ltd., and two days later they filed another libel suit against Hersh himself. Davies did not pursue the case, and Maxwell died the following month. In August 1994 the Mirror Group settled Maxwell's suit by paying Hersh and Faber & Faber damages, covering their legal costs, and issuing a formal apology to Hersh.

Two British MPs asked for further investigations into the book's revelations. Labour Party MP George Galloway proposed an independent tribunal to investigate the extent of foreign intelligence penetration of Maxwell's Mirror Group. Conservative Party MP Rupert Allason asked for the Department of Trade and Industry to see if potential arms sales to Iran had violated a UN embargo.

=== Pollard information ===
In The Samson Option Hersh cites Ben-Menashe and an anonymous Israeli source in stating that US intelligence information stolen by convicted spy Jonathan Pollard had been "sanitized" and given by Israeli Prime Minister Yitzhak Shamir directly to the Soviet Union. This information was said to include US data and satellite pictures which were used by US forces for nuclear targeting against the USSR. These claims were subsequently denied by the military aide to Shamir, the then Defense Minister Yitzhak Rabin, the Soviet official who was said to have received the information, and a Washington official.

=== Gates arms deals ===
Because Hersh named Ben-Menashe as a major source of the book, other allegations by the former Israeli official were granted greater attention. Among other things, Menashe had claimed that Robert Gates, then in Senate hearings to be confirmed as the director of the CIA, had been involved in "illegal arms shipments to Iraq" during the 1980s.
