= Killian documents authenticity issues =

Clues to forgery in a 2004 political controversy

During the Killian documents controversy in 2004, the authenticity of the documents themselves was disputed by a variety of individuals and groups. Proof of authenticity is not possible without original documents, and since CBS used only faxed and photocopied duplicates, authentication to professional standards would be impossible regardless of the provenance of the originals. However, proving documents inauthentic does not depend on the availability of originals, and the validity of these photocopied documents has been challenged on a number of grounds, ranging from anachronisms in their typography to issues pertaining to their content.

== Typography ==
Charles Johnson's animated GIF image comparing what CBS claimed to be a 1973-era typewritten memo with a 2004-era Microsoft Word document made with default settings

In the initial hours and days after the CBS broadcast, most of the criticism of the documents' authenticity centered on the fact that they did not look like typical typewritten documents and appeared very similar to documents produced with modern word-processing software. These criticisms, first raised by bloggers, were taken up by outlets of the mainstream press, including The Washington Post, The New York Times, the Chicago Sun-Times, and others, who sought opinions from multiple experts. The arguments and findings are summarized below.

=== Proportional fonts ===
One of the initial doubts bloggers raised about the memos was the use of proportional fonts (as opposed to a monospaced typeface, where all glyphs have a single, standard width). Most typewriters in 1972 used fixed-width fonts, and, according to The Washington Post, all of the authenticated documents from the TexANG were typed using fixed-width fonts commonly associated with typewriters.

Several experts interviewed by the media suggested that the proportional fonts in the documents indicated likely forgery. John Collins, vice president and chief technology officer at Bitstream Inc., the parent of Myfonts.com, stated that word processors that could produce proportional-sized fonts cost upwards of $20,000 at the time (equivalent to $154,000 in 2025). William Flynn, a forensic document specialist with 35 years of experience in police crime labs and private practice, said the CBS documents raise suspicions because of their use of proportional spacing techniques. The Washington Post also indicated the presence of proportional fonts as suspicious because "of more than 100 records made available by the 147th Group and the Texas Air National Guard, none used the proportional spacing techniques characteristic of the CBS documents".

Bill Glennon, a technology consultant in New York City with typewriter repair experience from 1973 to 1985, said experts making the claim that typewriters were incapable of producing the memos "are full of crap. They just don't know." He said there were IBM machines capable of producing the spacing, and a customized key — the likes of which he said were not unusual — for creating the superscript ^{th}.

Thomas W. Phinney II, program manager for fonts at Adobe Systems, responded to Glennon's statement by saying that the memos could not have been produced with either the IBM Executive or IBM Selectric Composer, which had been suggested as possibilities, due to differences in letter width and spacing. Phinney says that each time a typeface was redeveloped for mechanical technologies with different width factors, the width and designs are altered, which is why even if Press Roman had been intended to look like Times Roman, the result is significantly different. Phinney suggests that the real typist prevented Word from auto-formatting "th" in superscript by typing and deleting a space in some cases but in other cases did not use the space or left it in the document.

Phinney's analysis was based on the fact that the typography of the Killian documents could be closely matched with a modern personal computer and printer using Microsoft Word with the default font (Times New Roman) and other settings. Therefore, the equipment with which the Killian documents were actually produced must have been capable of matching the typographical characteristics produced by this modern technology.

As Phinney explained, the letterspacing of the Times New Roman font used by Microsoft Word with a modern personal computer and printer employs a system of 18 units relative to the letter height (em), with common characters being 5 to 17 units wide. (The technology allows even finer variability of character widths, but the 18 unit system was chosen for compatibility with the Linotype phototypesetting and earlier hot-metal versions of the font.) In contrast, the variability of character widths available on early 1970s typewriters using proportional letterspacing was more limited, due to the mechanical technology employed. The most sophisticated of these machines, the IBM Selectric Composer, used a system of 9 units relative to the letter height, in which all characters were 3 to 9 units wide. Less complex machines used fewer widths.

Differences in individual character widths accumulate over the length of a line, so that comparatively small differences would become readily apparent. Because of the differing character widths employed, the letterspacing exhibited by the Killian documents (matching that produced by a modern computer and printer) could not have been produced with a mechanical typewriter using proportional letterspacing in the early 1970s. At the time the documents were purportedly created, the matching letterspacing could only have been produced using phototypesetting or hot-metal printing. Since it is not a realistic possibility that Killian would have had these documents printed, Phinney concludes that they are almost certainly modern forgeries.

Phinney has long offered $1,000 "to anybody who can produce an office-level device that was available in 1972 that can replicate the relative line endings of those memos" but no-one has ever tried to do that.

Desktop magazine in Australia analysed the documents in its November 2004 issue and concluded that the typeface was a post-1985 version of Times Roman, rather than Times New Roman, both of which are different in detail to IBM Press Roman.

=== Inter-character spacing ===
Joseph Newcomer, who helped pioneer electronic typesetting and word processing software, claims that the memos display a simple alternative to kerning characteristic of TrueType fonts but not available on any office equipment in 1972. For example, in words containing "fr", TrueType moves the "r" left to tuck it in under the top part of the "f". The Weekly Standard called Newcomer's explanation the "definitive account" of why the documents were "necessarily forgeries." The Washington Post quoted Newcomer in an article regarding questions about the authenticity of the papers.

=== Centered headers ===
Creating centered headers is possible on a typewriter, even if the font is proportional. The typist can left-justify the header and then use the space bar to count the number of spaces from the end of the text to the right margin. In addition, the IBM Executive and Selectric have a kerning key that would give a more accurate measure of the whitespace. Once this number is determined, halving it gives the number of leading spaces for a centered header. The same centering will be achieved on different occasions if the paper is inserted flush to the paper guide, and the same count of spaces is applied. For an example of multiple centered lines produced using a proportionally spaced typewriter font, see the third page of the contemporary annual history of Bush's Alabama guard unit.

Word processors, by contrast, center text based on a computer algorithm using a fixed central reference point rather than the left margin on the typewriter as measured from the paper's edge. If the paper in a printer is flush to the left of the paper guide, then a word processor will achieve the same centering throughout a given page and on different pages. The bloggers asserted that it is unlikely that two documents produced 3 months apart by a manual centering process would exactly overlap. In the Killian memos the text matches perfectly when overlaid with a word processor-produced 3 line address block, and between the 3- and 2- line blocks of different memos.

=== Curved apostrophes ===
In several places, the documents use apostrophes such as in the words I'm and won't. These are curved somewhat to the left, similar to the shape of a comma. Most typewriters of the era featured vertical apostrophes, rather than angled or curved ones. They were also used for both the opening and closing quotation mark embedded within another quotation instead of the curved forms available in modern-day word processors. Compare the straight forms in

The witness testified that "Jones yelled, 'Run!' before fleeing the scene" in court yesterday.

to the curved forms in

The witness testified that “Jones yelled, ‘Run!’ before fleeing the scene” in court yesterday.

The latter requires two separate glyphs for each pair of single and double quotation marks.

=== Similarity to contemporary documents ===
The Washington Post reported that "of more than 100 records made available by the 147th Group and the Texas Air National Guard, none used the proportional spacing techniques characteristic of the CBS documents." This raises the question of the likelihood of a National Guard office having access to this type of equipment.

According to The Washington Post, "The analysis shows that half a dozen Killian memos released earlier by the military were written with a standard typewriter using different formatting techniques from those characteristic of computer-generated documents. CBS's Killian memos bear numerous signs that are more consistent with modern-day word-processing programs, particularly Microsoft Word..." (September 14, 2004).

== Content and formatting ==
In addition to typography, aspects of the memos such as the content and formatting have been challenged.

=== Signatures ===
Of the documents, only the May 4 memo bears a full signature. CBS stated that document examiner Marcel Matley had determined the signature was authentic. However, Matley told The Washington Post on September 14, "There's no way that I, as a document expert, can authenticate them" because they are copies far removed from the original source. Eugene P. Hussey, a certified forensic document examiner in Washington state, expressed the "limited opinion" that Killian did not sign or initial the documents.

=== Skepticism from Killian's family and others ===
Jerry Killian's wife and son argued that their father never used typewriting equipment and would have written these memos by hand. The family also stated that Killian was not known for keeping personal memos and that he had been very pleased with George W. Bush's performance in his TXANG unit.

In contrast, Killian's secretary at the time, Marian Carr Knox, stated, "We did discuss Bush's conduct and it was a problem Killian was concerned about. I think he was writing the memos so there would be some record that he was aware of what was going on and what he had done." Although she believed the content of the memos was accurate, she insisted that she did not type the memos CBS had obtained, called them fakes, and noted they contained Army terminology that the Air Guard never used.

Earl W. Lively, who at the time was the commanding officer at the Austin TXANG facility was quoted in the Washington Times as saying, "They're forged as hell."

=== Mention of influence by retired officer ===
Walter Staudt, cited in the memo dated August 18, 1973, as exerting pressure on officers to "sugar coat" their evaluations of Bush, had in fact retired from the service in March 1972.

Staudt also denied being pressured to accept George W. Bush into the National Guard, in an exclusive interview with ABC ("Speaking Out," September 17, 2004): "'No one called me about taking George (W.) Bush into the Air National Guard,' he said. 'It was my decision. I swore him in. I never heard anything from anybody. And I never pressured anybody about George (W.) Bush because I had no reason to,' Staudt told ABC News in his first interview since the documents were made public."

=== Mention of flight inquiry ===
It is a matter of record that Lt Bush was suspended from flight status on August 1, 1972, for failure to complete a required annual physical. The Killian memo dated May 4, 1972, is an order to Lt Bush requiring him to report for his physical by May 14, thus making it appear that Lt Bush ignored a direct written order. Lt. Bush's last rating report, dated May 2, 1973, states that Lt Bush "cleared" the base on May 15, 1972, to head to Alabama. The Killian memo of August 1 called for a flight inquiry board to review Lt Bush's status. However, no records of this request or the flight inquiry board itself have been found. Regulations required such a review following the grounding of any pilot.

=== Mother's Day ===
Retired Colonel and former TXANG pilot William Campenni disputed the document dated Thursday May 4, 1972, which ordered Bush to report for a flight physical not later than May 14. According to Campenni, the squadron commander supposedly ordered Bush to report on a weekend when the base was closed. The Ellington Air Guard Base was closed for Mother's Day the weekend of May 13–14. The next Air Guard drill weekend was May 20–21. Bush's last day on base was Monday, May 15, 1972, according to the official record.

== Peter Tytell's analysis ==
The CBS review panel led by Dick Thornburgh (a Republican and former U.S. Attorney General) and Louis Boccardi hired Peter Tytell, a leading document examiner, to analyze the four documents:

concluded ... that (i) the relevant portion of the Superscript Exemplar (from a previously released TexANG document from 1968) was produced on an Olympia manual typewriter, (ii) the Killian documents were not produced on an Olympia manual typewriter and (iii) the Killian documents were produced on a computer in Times New Roman typestyle [and that] the Killian documents were not produced on a typewriter in the early 1970s and therefore were not authentic.

== See also ==
- Questioned document examination
- Dan Rather
- John F. Kennedy document hoax – 1993 American political hoax — another forgery case from 1993; compare the typewriter forensics issues by which the alleged document age was falsified via detectable anachronisms
