= Robert Sam Anson =

American journalist and author (1945–2020)

- Born: March 12, 1945; Cleveland, Ohio, U.S.
- Died: November 2, 2020 (aged 75); Rexford, New York, U.S.
- Education: University of Notre Dame
- Occupation: Writer
- Spouses: Diane McAniff (c. late-1960s); Sharon Haddock (c. mid-1970s) Amanda Kay Kyser (m. 1985; div. 2017)
- Children: 3

Robert Sam Anson (March 12, 1945 – November 2, 2020) was an American journalist and author. He was noted for his work as a contributing editor to Vanity Fair. He also wrote many articles for Esquire, Life, Time, The Atlantic and other magazines.

He authored six nonfiction books, including Gone Crazy and Back Again: The Rise and Fall of the Rolling Stone Generation, about Jann Wenner and his magazine.

== Early life ==
Anson was born in Cleveland, Ohio, on March 12, 1945. His mother, Virginia Rose Anson, worked as a teacher. She raised him as a single parent, with the help of her own parents. His grandfather, Sam B. Anson, was a notable personality in the city's journalism industry as editor and publisher of several local daily newspapers. Anson graduated from Saint Ignatius High School in 1963. He went on to study international relations and English at the University of Notre Dame, obtaining a bachelor's degree from that institution in 1967. He spoke of Theodore Hesburgh, the president of Notre Dame at the time, as "the only father [he] ever had".

Anson started writing for Time during his studies and was consequently employed there full-time after graduation.

== Career ==
Two years after graduating, Anson went to Vietnam and Cambodia to cover the Vietnam War for Time. He was taken prisoner by North Vietnamese troops on August 3, 1970, and remained in captivity for three weeks. He avoided execution after convincing his captors that he was a journalist. He discovered 15 years later that Hesburgh called Pope Paul VI, who purportedly appealed to the Cambodian authorities to secure Anson's release. Anson subsequently wrote of his experience in War News: A Young Reporter in Indochina.

After being released, Anson relocated to the New York office of Time. He was a product of the New Journalism, which embraced the notion that journalists ought to immerse themselves in what they wrote and utilize "dramatic literary devices" to create a more powerful narrative. One of Anson's earliest tasks there was to cover boxer Joe Frazier. Fellow editor Chris Byron recounted how Anson got into the ring with Frazier, who promptly broke Anson's leg or dislocated his shoulder. Byron added how he "thought this guy [Anson] was completely out of his mind".

His 1981 Esquire cover story on Doug Kenney, "The Life and Death of a Comic Genius," was the first major print remembrance of the National Lampoon humorist and screenwriter. Anson attempted to write about The Walt Disney Company in the early 1990s. However, his publisher, Simon & Schuster, abruptly called off the project. He consequently sued the publishing company for $1 million, alleging that they had been pressured by superiors in the industry to abandon his book. The two parties eventually reached an out of court settlement.

Anson became editor of Los Angeles magazine in 1995, but was fired after only five months in the position. During this time, all but two of the magazine's 19 contributing editors left the publication within two months. Several employees and the Los Angeles Times criticized Anson for being temperamental and sexist. Others came to his defense, seeing that his clash of personalities with a dull workplace environment would inevitably upset those who were there. Anson returned to the East Coast, residing in Sag Harbor at the East End of Long Island. He did the majority of his writing in an Airstream trailer (which he nicknamed "the Bambi"), situated at the back of his house. He maintained a blog called "About Editing and Writing."

Anson conducted an interview with Hesburgh in 2006. They discussed political and global issues, as well as their past interactions with each other. The interview was not published until after Hesburgh's death in 2015.

== Personal life ==
Anson married his first wife, Diane McAniff, in the late 1960s, after meeting at the University of Notre Dame. They divorced shortly afterwards. His second marriage was to Sharon Haddock during the mid-1970s. He subsequently married Amanda Kay Kyser in 1985. They remained married until 2017. He had one son (Sam Gideon) and two daughters (Christian and Georgia Grace).

Anson overcame a bout of cancer. He consequently became involved with the Visible Ink writing program at the Memorial Sloan Kettering Cancer Center. He died on November 2, 2020, in Rexford, New York, at age 75. He had been suffering from dementia in the time leading up to his death.

== Books ==
- McGovern: A Biography (1972). New York: Holt, Rinehart and Winston; ISBN 9780030913457
- "They've Killed the President!": The Search for the Murderers of John F. Kennedy (1975). New York: Bantam Books. ISBN 9780553025255
- Gone Crazy and Back Again: The Rise and Fall of the Rolling Stone Generation (1981). Garden City: Doubleday. ISBN 9780385131148
- Exile: The Unquiet Oblivion of Richard M. Nixon (1984). New York: Simon and Schuster. ISBN 9780671440213
- Best Intentions: The Education and Killing of Edmund Perry (1987). New York: Random House. ISBN 9780394552743
- War News: A Young Reporter in Indochina (1989). New York: Simon and Schuster; ISBN 9780671665715
