= Lloyd Grove =

American journalist

- Born: Lloyd Bennett Grove; California, United States
- Citizenship: United States
- Occupations: Writer, editor, journalist
- Writing career
- Language: English
- Genres: Politics, journalism
- Notable work: The Daily Beast

Lloyd Bennett Grove is editor at large for The Daily Beast. He is also a frequent contributor to New York. He was a gossip columnist for New York Daily News before he left on October 9, 2006, and wrote a fortnightly column for Portfolio.com, the website of Conde Nast Portfolio Magazine, and was a contributing editor for Portfolio Magazine until it shut down in April 2009.

== Early life ==
Grove was born in California and grew up in Greenwich, Connecticut. He completed his BA in English at Yale University. While at Yale, Grove had a summer job as an assistant for a show business press agent and reported for the Yale Daily News.

== Career ==
He has written for the Washington Post, New York Magazine, Vanity Fair and Harper's Bazaar.

Since September 2003, Grove has written a weekday column called Lloyd Grove's Lowdown for the New York Daily News.

He has obtained notoriety for his articles on the following:

- US President George W. Bush's daughter's underage drinking
- Actors Tim Robbins' and Susan Sarandon's political influences
- Businessman Taki Theodoracopulos's anti-Israel joke
- Congressman Jim Moran settling a fight between two girlfriends
- Outgoing administration's vandalism of Bush White House
- Olbermann's Worst Person of The World for March 13, 2006
