= Seymour Hersh =

American investigative journalist (born 1937)

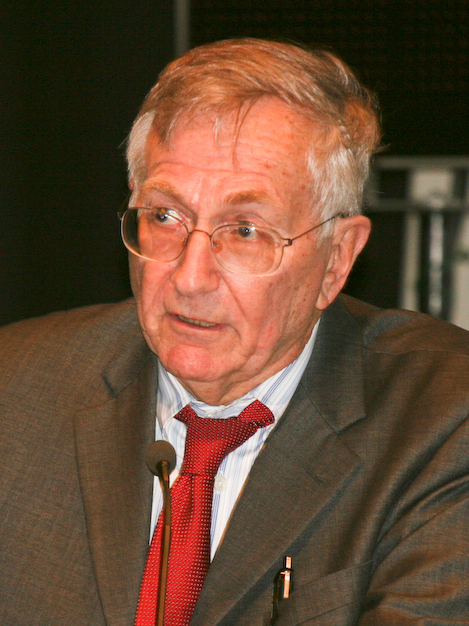
- Hersh in 2009
- Born: Seymour Myron Hersh; April 8, 1937 (age 89); Chicago, Illinois, U.S.
- Other name: Sy Hersh
- Education: University of Chicago (BA)
- Occupations: Journalist, writer
- Spouse: Elizabeth Sarah Klein (m. 1964)
- Children: 3
- Awards: George Polk Award (1969, 1973, 1974, 1981, 2004); Pulitzer Prize (1970); National Book Critics Circle Award (1983); National Magazine Award (2004, 2005)
- Website: seymourhersh.substack.com

Seymour Myron Hersh (born April 8, 1937) is an American investigative journalist and political writer. He gained recognition in 1969 for exposing the My Lai massacre and its cover-up during the Vietnam War, for which he received the 1970 Pulitzer Prize for International Reporting. During the 1970s, Hersh covered the Watergate scandal for The New York Times, also reporting on the secret U.S. bombing of Cambodia and the Central Intelligence Agency's (CIA) program of domestic spying. In 2004, he detailed the U.S. military's torture and abuse of prisoners at Abu Ghraib in Iraq for The New Yorker. Hersh has won five George Polk Awards and two National Magazine Awards. He is the author of 11 books, including The Price of Power: Kissinger in the Nixon White House (1983), an account of the career of Henry Kissinger that won the National Book Critics Circle Award.

From the 2010s onward, several of Hersh's investigations became increasingly controversial. His reporting on the Ghouta chemical attack, the Osama bin Laden raid, the Khan Shaykhun chemical attack, and the Nord Stream pipelines sabotage was disputed by other journalists, investigators, and open-source researchers. His later reporting has also attracted criticism for its reliance on anonymous sources and the level of editorial review applied to work published outside The New Yorker. In 2023, Hersh alleged that the United States and Norway were responsible for the Nord Stream sabotage, an account he primarily based on a single anonymous source, as well as President Joe Biden's statement in February 2022 on repercussions for Nord Steam in case of a Russian invasion of Ukraine.

== Early life and education ==
Hersh was born in Chicago, Illinois, on April 8, 1937, to Isador and Dorothy Hersh (née Margolis), Yiddish-speaking Jews who had immigrated to the U.S. in the 1920s from Lithuania and Poland, respectively. Isador's original surname was Hershowitz, which he changed upon becoming a citizen in 1930. As a teenager, Seymour helped run the family's dry cleaning shop on the South Side. Hersh graduated from Hyde Park High School in 1954, then attended the University of Illinois Chicago and later the University of Chicago, where he graduated with a history degree in 1958. He worked as a Xerox salesman before being admitted to the University of Chicago Law School in 1959, but was expelled during his first year due to poor grades.

== Newspaper career ==
After briefly working at a Walgreens drugstore, Hersh began his career in 1959 with a seven-month stint at the City News Bureau of Chicago, first as a copyboy and later as a crime reporter. In 1960, he enlisted as an Army reservist, and spent three months in basic training at Fort Leavenworth in Kansas. After returning to Chicago, in 1961 Hersh launched the Evergreen Dispatch, a short-lived weekly newspaper for the suburb of Evergreen Park. He moved to Pierre, South Dakota, in 1962 to work as a correspondent for United Press International (UPI), reporting on the state legislature and writing a series of articles on the Oglala Sioux.

In 1963, Hersh moved back to Chicago to work for the Associated Press (AP), and in 1965 he was transferred to its Washington, D.C., bureau to report on the Pentagon. In Washington, he befriended famed investigative journalist I. F. Stone, whose muckraking newsletter I. F. Stone's Weekly inspired Hersh. Hersh began to develop his investigative methods, often walking out of regimented press briefings at the Pentagon to interview high-ranking officers in their lunch halls. In 1966, he reported on the intensifying U.S. involvement in the Vietnam War, writing a series of articles on draft reform, the shortage of qualified pilots, and on the U.S. bombing of civilian targets in North Vietnam, revealed by New York Times correspondent Harrison Salisbury.

In 1967, Hersh became part of the AP's first special investigative unit. After his editors diminished a piece he wrote on the U.S.'s secretive chemical and biological weapons programs, he quit and became a freelancer. Hersh wrote six articles in national magazines in 1967 (two for The New Republic, two for Ramparts, and two for The New York Times Magazine) in which he detailed the government's growing stockpiles of the weapons and its cooperation with universities and corporations, as well as the secret adoption of a first-use policy. The research formed the basis for his first book, Chemical and Biological Warfare: America's Hidden Arsenal (1968), and the topic was highlighted that year by the Dugway sheep incident, in which an aerial test of VX nerve agent at the U.S. Army's Dugway Proving Ground in Utah inadvertently killed more than 6,000 sheep owned by local ranchers. The event and Hersh's reporting led to public hearings and international pressure, contributing to the Nixon administration's decision to end the U.S. biological weapons program in 1969.

In the first three months of 1968, Hersh served as the press secretary for anti–Vietnam War candidate Senator Eugene McCarthy in his campaign in the 1968 Democratic Party presidential primaries. After resigning before the Wisconsin primary, he returned to journalism as a freelance reporter on Vietnam.

=== My Lai massacre ===
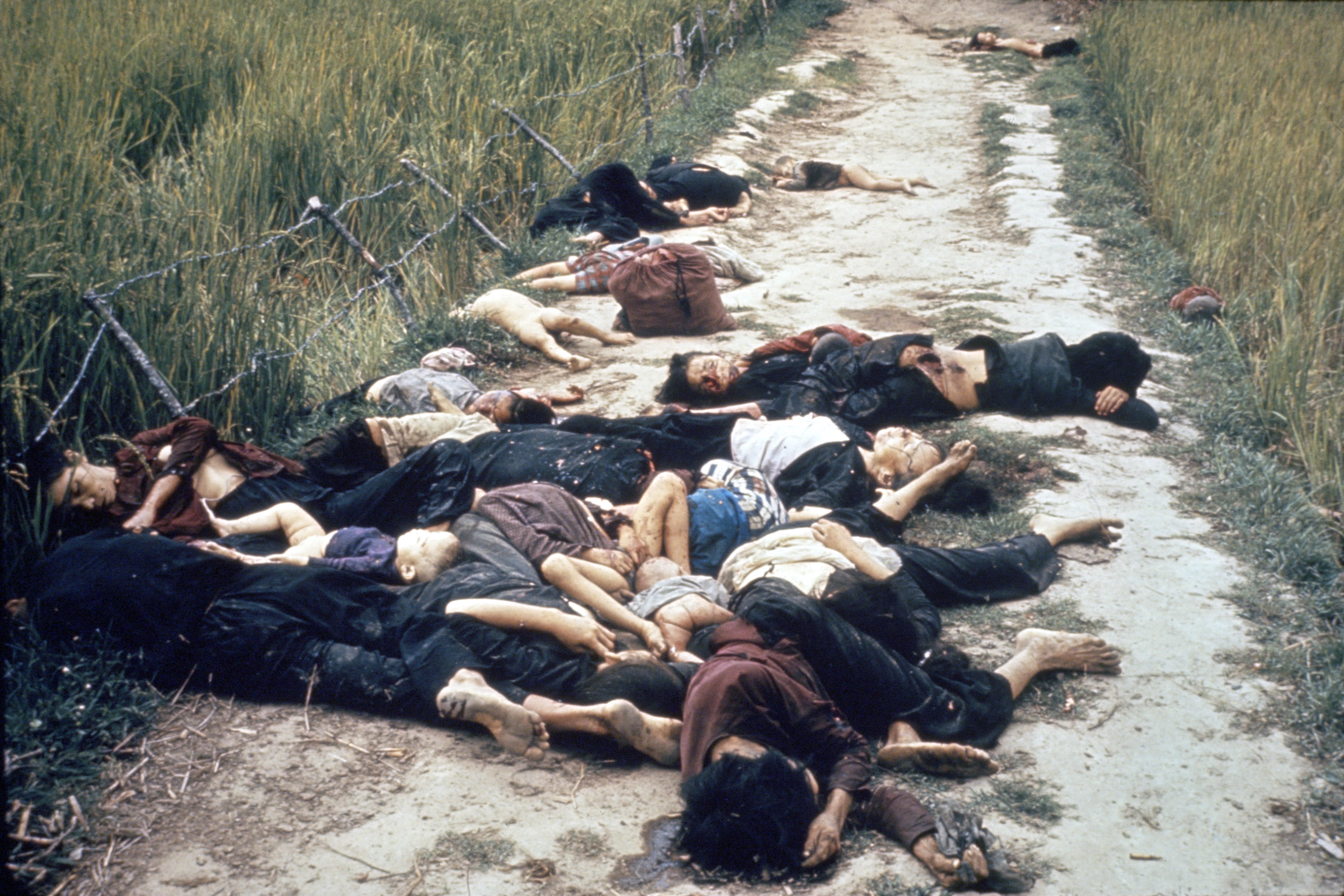
Dead civilians after the massacre in a photo by Ronald L. Haeberle

In 1969, Hersh reported on the My Lai massacre, the murder of between 347 and 504 unarmed Vietnamese civilians (almost all women, children, and elderly men) by U.S. soldiers in a village on March 16, 1968. The initial information about the massacre came from whistleblower Ronald Ridenhour, who had investigated while serving as a soldier in the 11th Infantry Brigade in South Vietnam.

On October 22, 1969, Hersh received a tip from Geoffrey Cowan, a Village Voice columnist with a military source, about a soldier being held at Fort Benning in Georgia for a court-martial for allegedly killing 75 civilians in South Vietnam. After speaking with a Pentagon contact and Fort Benning's public relations office, Hersh found an AP story from September 7 that identified the soldier as Lieutenant William Calley. He next found Calley's lawyer, George W. Latimer, who met with him in Salt Lake City, Utah, and showed him a document that revealed that Calley was charged with killing 109 people.

On November 11, Hersh traveled to Fort Benning, where he gained the confidence of Calley's roommates and eventually Calley himself, whom he interviewed that night. Hersh's first article on the massacre, a cautious piece that Latimer approved, was initially rejected by Life and Look magazines. Hersh next approached the antiwar Dispatch News Service, run by his friend David Obst, which sold the story to 35 national newspapers. On November 13, the story appeared in The Washington Post, The Boston Globe, the Miami Herald, the Chicago Sun-Times, The Seattle Times, and Newsday, among others. Initial reaction was muted, with the press largely focusing on a massive antiwar demonstration in Washington, D.C. scheduled for November 15.

Follow-up articles by other reporters revealed that the Army's investigation had been prompted by a March 29 letter by Ronald Ridenhour, a Vietnam veteran who had interviewed soldiers who knew of the killings. After traveling to California and visiting Ridenhour, who gave him their personal information, Hersh traveled across the country to interview the soldiers. He learned that eyewitnesses had been told not to talk to anyone, and that the actual death count was in the hundreds. On November 20, Dispatch syndicated Hersh's second article, which was published internationally. The same day, photos of the massacre by Army photographer Ronald L. Haeberle were published in the Cleveland Plain Dealer, causing outrage among members of Congress and the public. The reporting was being followed by The New York Times and the Washington Post, and was covered on the CBS and NBC national nightly news programs.

Hersh next interviewed Paul Meadlo, a soldier who admitted that he had killed dozens of civilians on Calley's orders. Meadlo's mother told Hersh that she "sent them a good boy and they made him a murderer". Hersh's third article was syndicated by Dispatch on November 25, and that night an interview with Meadlo by Mike Wallace on the CBS News program 60 Minutes was broadcast on national television. The White House acknowledged the massacre for the first time the next day, and the Army appointed General William R. Peers to head an official commission investigating it. Hersh visited 50 witnesses over the next three months, 35 of whom agreed to talk. His fourth article, syndicated on December 2, revealed random killings of civilians in the days before the massacre; a fifth article was published weeks later. Ten pages of Haeberle's photos were printed in Life magazine on December 5.

Hersh's reporting garnered him national fame, and encouraged the growing opposition to the war in the U.S. He was also attacked by some in the press and government who questioned his work and motivations. An op-ed column in the Times by James Reston asked: "Whatever happened in the massacre, should it be reported by press, radio and television, since clearly reporting the murder of civilians by American soldiers helps the enemy, divides the people of this country, and damages the ideal of America in the world?" South Carolina Republican Representative Albert Watson said, "this is no time to cast aspersions on our fighting men, the President and ourselves for that matter, as some members of the national news media and a few demagogues are doing". The reveal of the massacre changed American media coverage of the war, which was restrained and had limited independence from official sources in its reporting before 1967; major newspapers began reporting on other U.S. atrocities in Vietnam.

For his coverage of My Lai, Hersh won the 1970 Pulitzer Prize for International Reporting and numerous other awards, including his first George Polk Award. He later wrote in a note to Robert Loomis, the editor of his 1970 book-length account of the massacre, My Lai 4: A Report on the Massacre and Its Aftermath:

Some will claim that I have attempted to exploit some dumb, out of service, overly talkative G.I.s. But few men are exposed to charges of murder ... it is not a "naming names and telling all affair". In fact, one of the strengths is that discriminating readers will know how much more I know—and did not tell. I'm convinced that to give the name and hometown of a G.I. who committed rape and murder that day, or one who beheaded an infant, would not further the aim of the book. It is an exposé, but not of the men of Charlie Company. Something much more significant is being put to light. ... Both the killer and the killed are victims in Vietnam; the peasant who is shot down for no reason and the G.I. who is taught, or comes to believe, that a Vietnamese life somehow has less meaning than his wife's, or his sister's, or his mother's.

On March 14, 1970, the Peers Commission submitted to the Army its secret report on the massacre, containing more than 20,000 pages of testimony from 400 witnesses. One of Hersh's sources leaked the testimony to him over a year; it revealed that at least 347 civilians were killed, over twice as many as the Army had publicly conceded. The leak formed the basis for two articles by Hersh for The New Yorker in 1972, which alleged that officers had destroyed documents on the massacre, as well as his 1972 book Cover-Up: The Army's Secret Investigation of the Massacre at My Lai 4.

=== The New York Times ===
In April 1972, Hersh was hired by The New York Times as an investigative journalist at the paper's Washington bureau. After the June 17 break-in at the Democratic National Committee headquarters in Washington and the emergence of the Watergate scandal, the Times sought to catch up with the reporting of Bob Woodward and Carl Bernstein at The Washington Post, who broke several stories in 1972 linking the break-in to the Nixon campaign. Together with Walter Rugaber, Hersh produced extensive reporting for the Times on the unfolding scandal. An article he published on January 14, 1973, revealed that hush money payments were still being made to the burglars, which shifted the press's focus from the break-in itself to its cover-up. During 1973, Hersh wrote more than 40 articles on Watergate, most printed on page one; his reveals included the FBI's failure to investigate political operative Donald Segretti, despite knowing of his activities, and leaks from the grand jury testimonies of former Attorney General John Mitchell and burglar James McCord, the latter of whom revealed that the Committee to Re-Elect the President had made the payments. John Dean, Nixon's counsel, later said that while it had been the Post's articles in 1972 that had encouraged prosecutors, "the most devastating pieces that strike awfully close to home" were Hersh's in 1973 and 1974.

Hersh contributed to the revelations about Operation Menu, the secret U.S. bombing of neutral Cambodia in 1969–1970. On June 11, 1972, an article by Hersh alleged that General John D. Lavelle, who had recently been relieved as commander of the Air Force in Southeast Asia, was ousted because he had ordered repeated, unauthorized bombings of North Vietnam. The ensuing "Lavelle affair" led to Senate Armed Services Committee hearings in September 1972. After reading Hersh's articles on the affair, Major Hal Knight, who had supervised radar crews in Vietnam, realized that the Senate "was unaware of what had taken place while I was out there", and in early 1973 wrote a letter to the committee that confessed his role in the cover-up of Operation Menu, in which he recorded fake bombing coordinates and burned his orders.

Hersh learned of Knight's letter after exposing a different scandal on May 17, 1973, in which Nixon and National Security Advisor Henry Kissinger had authorized wiretaps of employees of the National Security Council after early bombings of Cambodia were exposed in the Times in May 1969. Hersh interviewed Knight and detailed the cover-up of Menu in an article on July 15, 1973, one day before the start of Knight's public testimony. On July 16, Secretary of Defense James R. Schlesinger admitted that the Air Force had flown 3,630 raids over Cambodia in 14 months, dropping more than 100,000 tons of bombs. Hersh continued to investigate who had ordered the cover-up; in an interview, Kissinger said Nixon had "neither ordered nor was aware of any falsification". On July 31, former chairman of the Joint Chiefs of Staff General Earle Wheeler admitted that Nixon had ordered him to falsify records. Nixon's impeachment on this basis was proposed that day by Representative Robert Drinan, and it was considered as an article alongside the Watergate cover-up during the House debate on Nixon's articles of impeachment in July 1974.

In early 1974, Hersh planned to publish a story on "Project Jennifer" (later revealed to be codenamed Project Azorian), a covert CIA operation that partially recovered the sunken Soviet submarine K-129 from the floor of the Pacific Ocean with a purpose-built vessel, the Glomar Explorer. The ship, which was falsely presented as an underwater mineral mining vessel, was built by a company owned by magnate Howard Hughes. After a discussion with CIA director William Colby, Hersh promised not to publish the story while the operation was still active, in order to avoid triggering a potential international incident. The Times published Hersh's article on March 19, 1975, with an added five-paragraph explanation of the publishing history and one-year delay.

On September 8, 1974, an article by Hersh revealed that the CIA, with Kissinger's approval, had spent $8 million to influence Chilean unions, political parties, and media in order to destabilize the government of socialist Salvador Allende, who was overthrown in the September 11, 1973, coup d'état that brought to power a military dictatorship under General Augusto Pinochet. Hersh followed up the story over the next two months, with 27 articles in total.

On December 22, 1974, Hersh exposed Operation CHAOS, a massive CIA program of domestic wiretapping and infiltration of antiwar groups during the Nixon administration, which was conducted in direct violation of the agency's charter. Hersh reported that dossiers had been compiled on at least 10,000 U.S. citizens, including congressmen; the government eventually conceded the figure was closer to 300,000. He wrote 34 more articles on the story over the next months; they prompted the formation of the Rockefeller Commission and Church Committee, which investigated covert CIA operations and led to reforms of the agency. Hersh's exposure of CHAOS was the earliest reporting to reveal contents of the CIA's "Family Jewels" list of its own illegal activities. Hersh soon felt "double-crossed" after learning of a January 16, 1975, meeting between the paper's top editors (including executive editor A. M. Rosenthal) and President Gerald Ford, in which Ford mentioned CIA political assassinations—a comment he asked to be struck from the record; the editors agreed not to tell Hersh about the disclosure. Hersh thereafter decided to move away from reporting on the CIA.

On May 25, 1975, Hersh revealed that the U.S. Navy was using submarines to collect intelligence inside the three-mile protected coastal zone of the Soviet Union in a spy program codenamed "Holystone", which had continued for at least 15 years. It was later revealed that Dick Cheney, one of Ford's top aides and later George W. Bush's vice president, proposed that the FBI search the home of Hersh and his sources to halt his reporting on the subject.

In 1976, Hersh moved with his family to New York, where his wife attended medical school. He began working on larger projects; the first was a four-part investigation produced with Jeff Gerth, initially appearing on June 27, 1976, into the activities of Sidney Korshak, a lawyer and "fixer" for the Chicago Mafia, union leaders, and Hollywood. On July 24, 1977, the Times published the first entry in a three-part investigation by Hersh and Gerth into financial impropriety at Gulf and Western Industries, one of the country's largest conglomerates; it was followed by two civil lawsuits by the Securities and Exchange Commission. The Times management was ambivalent about Hersh's new focus (he later said the paper "wasn't nearly as happy when we went after business wrongdoing as when we were kicking around some slob in government"), and he left the job in 1979 to start writing a book on Kissinger.

In 1981, a New York Times Magazine article by Hersh described how former CIA agents Edwin Wilson and Frank Terpil had worked with Libyan leader Muammar Gaddafi to illegally export explosives and train his troops for terrorism. Hersh reported that the CIA had given the pair tacit approval to oversee the sale of American technology. Gerth followed up on the story at the Times through 1982, prompting reforms at the agency.

== Investigative books: 1980s and 1990s ==
Hersh's 1983 book The Price of Power: Kissinger in the Nixon White House, which involved four years of exhaustive work and more than 1,000 interviews, was a best-seller and won him the National Book Critics Circle Award for Nonfiction. The book's 41 chapters include 13 devoted to Kissinger's role in Vietnam and the bombing of Cambodia; other topics include his role in the Chilean coup, the Indo-Pakistani War of 1971, domestic wiretapping, and the White House Plumbers, as well as Hersh's criticism of his former Times colleagues, such as Max Frankel and James Reston, for their proximity to him. One much-discussed allegation was that Kissinger, originally an advisor to Nelson Rockefeller in the 1968 Republican Party presidential primaries before his loss to Nixon, had offered Democratic nominee Hubert Humphrey damaging material on Nixon before going to the Nixon campaign with secret information he had gathered from the Vietnam War's Paris peace negotiations. The book also alleges that Kissinger alerted Nixon to President Lyndon B. Johnson's October 31, 1968, bombing halt 12 hours in advance, securing his position in the administration. The book is noted for its density of information and prosecutorial tone, and has been credited with preventing Kissinger from returning to a government position during the Reagan administration.

While writing the book, Hersh revisited his previous reporting on Edward M. Korry, the U.S. ambassador to Chile from 1967 to 1971. In 1974, Hersh had reported in the Times that Korry had known of the CIA's efforts to foment a coup. Korry, who had reacted to the claim with furious denial, demanded a front-page retraction in exchange for documents Hersh wanted for his book. The retraction, which Time called the "longest correction ever published", appeared on February 9, 1981. Peter Kornbluh, Chile expert at the National Security Archive, later judged based on declassified documents that Korry was unaware of CIA involvement. Also in the book is the claim that former Indian Prime Minister Morarji Desai had been paid $20,000 per year by the CIA during the Johnson and Nixon administrations. Desai filed a $50 million libel lawsuit against Hersh; when it went to trial in 1989, Desai, then 93, was too ill to attend, but Kissinger appeared and testified that Desai had not worked in any capacity for the CIA. A Chicago jury ruled in Hersh's favor, finding it had not been proved that Hersh had intended to write falsehoods or that he had shown reckless disregard for the truth, either of which must be proven in a libel suit.

In 1983, Hersh published a 20,000-word article, "The Pardon", in The Atlantic, examining the circumstances surrounding Gerald Ford's decision to pardon Richard Nixon. Hersh reported that Nixon had threatened to publicly claim that Ford had promised him a pardon in exchange for the presidency in a deal brokered by Nixon's chief of staff Alexander Haig. Ford, whom Hersh interviewed for the story, denied that any such bargain existed, but Hersh wrote that several former aides continued to believe that some form of agreement had been made, though he stopped short of asserting that a deal had been conclusively established.

Hersh worked on and narrated the 1985 PBS Frontline documentary "Buying the Bomb", which reported on a Pakistani businessman who had attempted to smuggle krytron devices that could be used as nuclear bomb triggers out of the U.S. On June 12, 1986, an article by Hersh in the Times revealed that U.S.-backed dictator of Panama Manuel Noriega was a key figure in weapons and narcotics trafficking. The article was the first in a "political landslide" of allegations against Noriega; in 1989, the U.S. invaded Panama and captured him, taking him to the U.S. to stand trial.

Hersh spent much of the decade writing two critically acclaimed but commercially unsuccessful books. In The Target Is Destroyed (1986), he examined the 1983 shootdown of Korean Air Lines Flight 007 by the Soviet Union. He reported that the U.S. Air Force knew almost immediately that the Soviets believed they had shot down a military plane, and that the U.S. misrepresented the situation to portray the Soviets as deliberate murderers of civilians. In The Samson Option (1991), Hersh chronicled the history of Israel's nuclear weapon program, arguing that nuclear capability was sought from the state's founding and that it was achieved under a U.S. policy of feigned ignorance and indirect assistance. Hersh also wrote that Israel received aid from the U.S. in the 1973 Yom Kippur War through "nuclear blackmail" (Israel's threat to use the weapons against its Arab enemies). Another major allegation was that the intelligence passed to Israel by convicted American spy Jonathan Pollard had been shared with the Soviet Union by former Prime Minister Yitzhak Rabin, who denied the charge. Another allegation was that British media magnate Robert Maxwell was an informant for Mossad, Israel's national intelligence agency; Maxwell filed a defamation lawsuit against Hersh, but died in a drowning incident two weeks after the book was published.

Hersh's 1997 best-seller The Dark Side of Camelot, about the political career of John F. Kennedy, was controversial and heavily criticized. Shortly before publication, it emerged in the press that Hersh had removed claims at the last minute that were based on forged documents provided to him by fraudster Lex Cusack, including a fake hush money contract between Kennedy and Marilyn Monroe. An article about the controversy in The Washington Post said: "The strange and twisted saga of the JFK file is part cautionary tale, part slapstick farce, a story of deception and self-delusion in the service of commerce and journalism". Hersh and a onetime co-author had received an $800,000 advance for the project. Other aspects of the book also came under criticism, including its prying into Kennedy's alleged sexual escapades based on interviews with his Secret Service guards and its claim that Kennedy used Judith Exner as a courier to deliver cash to mobster Sam Giancana, made by a source who later recanted it before the Assassination Records Review Board.

In 1998, Hersh published Against All Enemies: Gulf War Syndrome: The War Between America's Ailing Veterans and Their Government, about Gulf War syndrome. He estimated that 15% of returning American troops were afflicted by the chronic and multi-symptomatic disorder, and challenged the government claim that they were suffering from war fatigue, as opposed to the effects of chemical or biological weapons. He suggested the smoke from the destruction of a weapon depot that stored nerve gas at Khamisiyah in Iraq, to which more than 100,000 soldiers were exposed, as a possible cause.

== Later investigations ==
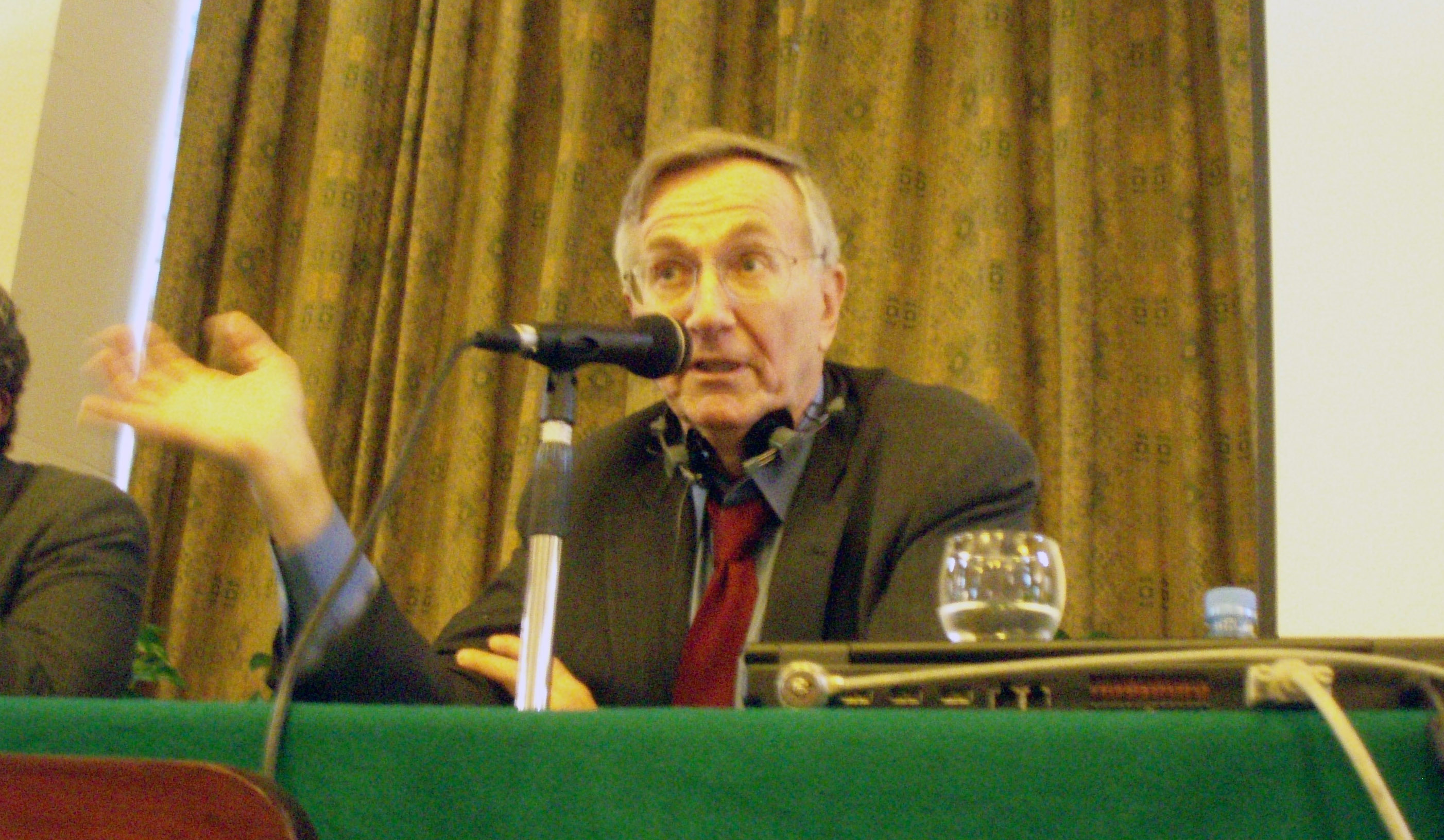
Hersh in Cairo in 2007

In 1993, Hersh became a regular contributor to The New Yorker, edited by Tina Brown until 1998 and David Remnick thereafter. A piece by him in 1993 alleged that Pakistan had developed nuclear weapons with the consent of the Reagan and Bush administrations, using restricted, high-tech materials purchased in the U.S. In May 2000, Hersh's article "Overwhelming Force", the longest piece in the magazine since 1993, detailed the Battle of Rumaila, an alleged massacre of retreating and surrendering Iraqi troops by soldiers under General Barry McCaffrey on the "Highway of Death" in the final days of the 1990–1991 Gulf War. He had received tips on the incident, which the U.S. Army had investigated and dismissed, from other officers while investigating McCaffrey's role in the Colombian drug war. Hersh did six months of research for the article and interviewed 300 people, including soldiers who had witnessed the killings; he alleged that McCaffrey had deceived his superiors and disregarded ceasefire orders. In July 2001, the magazine published Hersh's investigation of Mobil's illegal multibillion-dollar oil swap deal between Kazakhstan and Iran in the 1990s.

After the September 11, 2001, terrorist attacks, Hersh turned his focus to U.S. policy in the Middle East and the Bush administration's "war on terror". In The New Yorker, he reported on U.S. intelligence failures surrounding 9/11; the corruption of the Saudi royal family and its alleged financial support for Osama bin Laden; and the potential instability of the Pakistani nuclear arsenal, including an article alleging that the Pentagon was planning a covert operation inside Pakistan to disarm the weapons. President Bush told Pakistani President Pervez Musharraf that Hersh was "a liar". During the U.S. invasion of Afghanistan, Hersh reported that a Predator drone had followed a convoy carrying Taliban leader Mullah Omar, but that delayed approval for a missile strike had allowed him to escape; that a failed Army Delta Force raid on Omar's compound in Kandahar had led to an escape in which 12 soldiers were injured; and that a U.S.-backed airlift of Pakistani officers from Kunduz in Afghanistan had inadvertently carried Taliban and al-Qaeda fighters. Hersh later reported on the government's flawed prosecution of Zacarias Moussaoui, the U.S.'s aggressive assassination efforts against al-Qaeda members, and business conflicts of interest held by Richard Perle, chairman of the Pentagon's advisory Defense Policy Board, which led to his resignation.

=== Iraq and Abu Ghraib ===
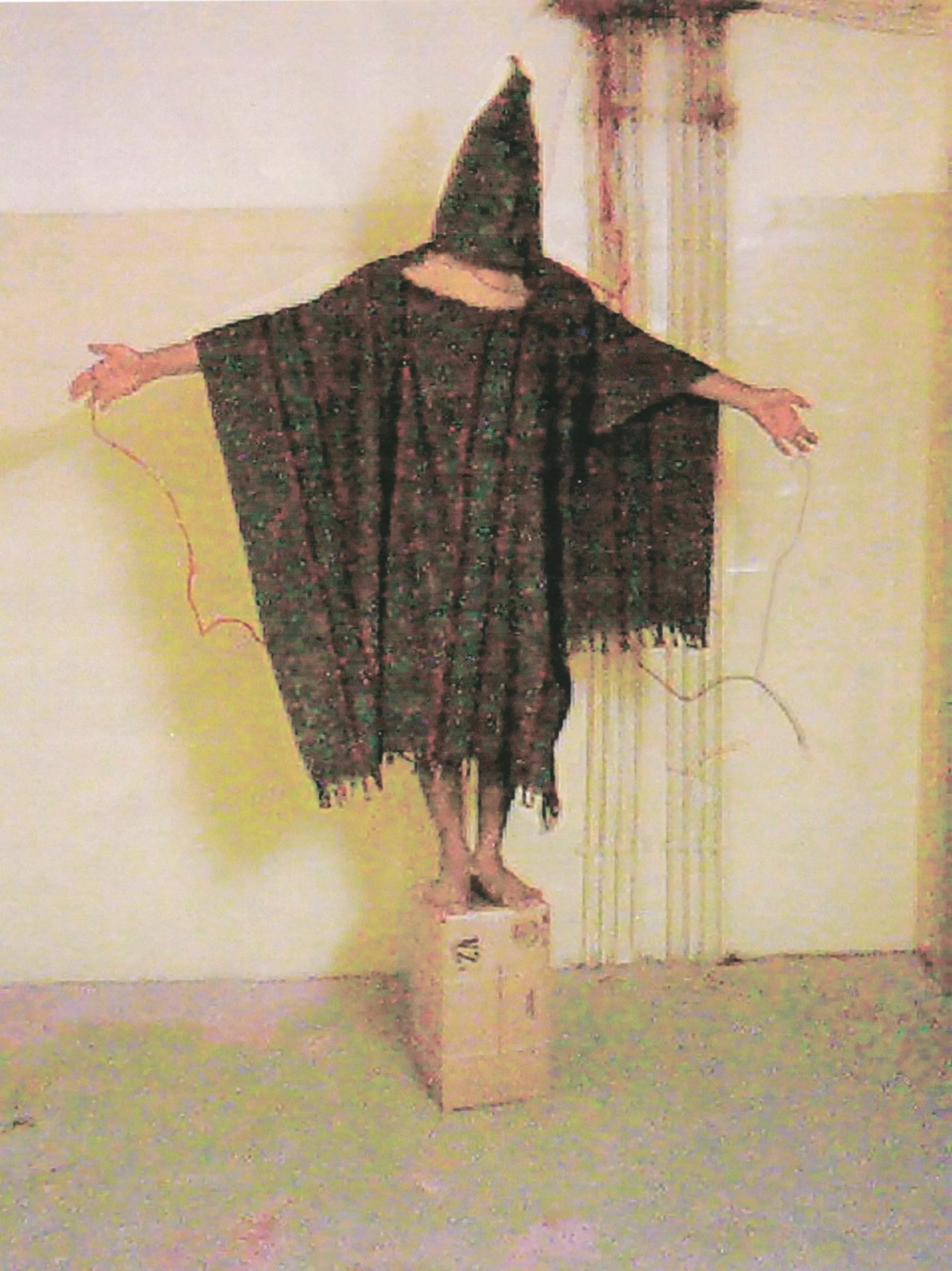
The infamous photo of a hooded Iraqi prisoner from Hersh's first article on the abuse, "Torture at Abu Ghraib"

Following the U.S. invasion of Iraq in 2003, Hersh disputed the Bush administration's erroneous claims about Saddam Hussein's alleged stockpile of weapons of mass destruction and ties to terrorism, which had been used to justify the invasion. He reported that the claim that Iraq had received nuclear materials from Niger was based on forged documents, that the Pentagon's Office of Special Plans had provided dubious intelligence to the White House on Iraq's weapons capacity, and that the Bush administration had pressured the intelligence community to violate its "stovepiping" rule, which allowed only vetted and confirmed information to rise up the chain of command.

On April 30, 2004, Hersh published the first of three articles in The New Yorker detailing the U.S. military's torture and abuse of detainees at Abu Ghraib prison near Baghdad. The story, "Torture at Abu Ghraib", was accompanied by a now-infamous photo of an Iraqi prisoner standing on a box and wearing a black pointed hood, his hands spread out and attached to electrodes. A short piece with the photo and others had appeared two days earlier on the CBS News program 60 Minutes II, in anticipation of Hersh's article. He described these photos:

In one, Private [Lynndie] England, a cigarette dangling from her mouth, is giving a jaunty thumbs-up sign and pointing at the genitals of a young Iraqi, who is naked except for a sandbag over his head, as he masturbates. Three other hooded and naked Iraqi prisoners are shown, hands reflexively crossed over their genitals. ... In another, England stands arm in arm with Specialist [Charles] Graner; both are grinning and giving the thumbs-up behind a cluster of perhaps seven naked Iraqis, knees bent, piled clumsily on top of each other in a pyramid. ... Yet another photograph shows a kneeling, naked, unhooded male prisoner ... posed to make it appear that he is performing oral sex on another male prisoner, who is naked and hooded.

Hersh had obtained a secret report from an internal Army investigation headed by General Antonio Taguba that had been submitted on March 3. It detailed more of the abuses, including pouring cold water and liquid from broken chemical lights on naked detainees, beatings with a broomstick and a chair, threatening men with rape, allowing guards to stitch wounds from a beating, sodomizing a detainee with a chemical light and a broomstick, and using military dogs to intimidate. The article also alleged that military intelligence teams, which included CIA officers and "interrogation specialists" from private contractors, had directed the abuse at the prison. In two articles in May 2004, "Chain of Command" and "The Gray Zone", Hersh alleged that the abuse stemmed from a top-secret special access program (SAP) authorized by Secretary of Defense Donald Rumsfeld during the invasion of Afghanistan in 2001, which provided blanket approval for killings, kidnappings, and interrogations (at Guantanamo Bay and CIA black sites) of "high-value" targets. He alleged that the SAP was extended to Iraq's military prisons in 2003 to gather intelligence on the growing insurgency, with Rumsfeld and Under Secretary of Defense for Intelligence Stephen Cambone also extending its methods of physical coercion and sexual humiliation, under the name "Copper Green".

Pentagon spokesman Lawrence Di Rita called the allegations "outlandish, conspiratorial, and filled with error and anonymous conjecture", and said they reflected "the fevered insights of those with little, if any, connection to the activities in the Department of Defense"; he added: "With these false claims, the Magazine and the reporter have made themselves part of the story." As the scandal grew and calls for Rumsfeld to resign mounted, he privately offered to step down, which Bush rejected. Later stories by other reporters revealed the Torture Memos, in which the Department of Justice had advised the Pentagon and the CIA on the legality of "enhanced interrogation techniques". As after Hersh's reporting on the My Lai massacre, he garnered national and international attention and won multiple awards, including his fifth George Polk Award. A book compiling and building on his post-9/11 reporting, Chain of Command: The Road from 9/11 to Abu Ghraib, was published later in 2004.

In July 2005, an article by Hersh alleged that the U.S. had covertly intervened in favor of Ayad Allawi in the January 2005 Iraqi parliamentary election, in an "off the books" campaign conducted by retired CIA officers and non-government personnel, and with funds "not necessarily" appropriated by Congress.

=== Iran ===
In his January 2005 The New Yorker article "The Coming Wars", Hersh wrote that the next U.S. target in the Middle East was Iran, and alleged that covert U.S. reconnaissance missions, including a commando task force, had infiltrated the country to gather intelligence on nuclear, chemical, and missile sites since mid-2004. In April 2006, Hersh's article "The Iran Plans" alleged that the Bush administration was accelerating military planning for an attack on Iran and that the Pentagon had presented the White House the option of using bunker-buster nuclear weapons on Iran's underground uranium enrichment sites; he further alleged that the Joint Chiefs of Staff later sought to drop this option, which White House officials had resisted. The article also alleged that U.S. troops were infiltrating Iran to establish contact with anti-government minority groups and that carrier-based aircraft were flying simulated nuclear bombing runs. Hersh wrote several more pieces on this alleged plan in the next two years, including a July 2006 article on how senior commanders were challenging Bush's plan for a major bombing campaign, articles in November 2006 and March 2007 on the plan's refocusing on targets in Iran aiding Iraqi militants, and an October 2007 article on planned "surgical" strikes on Iranian Quds Force training camps and supply depots.

In an August 2006 article, Hersh alleged that the U.S. was involved in the planning of Israel's attacks on Hezbollah in the 2006 Lebanon War as a "prelude" to the U.S. bombing of Iran. In his March 2007 article "The Redirection", he alleged that the U.S. and Saudi Arabia were covertly supporting Sunni extremist groups to combat the influence of Shiite Iran and Syria, and that the Lebanese government of Fouad Siniora was using its U.S. backing to supply weapons to Osbat al-Ansar and Fatah al-Islam, militant groups in Palestinian refugee camps, to develop a counterbalance to Shiite-backed Hezbollah. In May 2007, Lebanon attacked Fatah al-Islam, which it accused of having ties to the Syrian government, starting a severe domestic conflict.

In his June 2008 article "Preparing the Battlefield", Hersh alleged that Congress had secretly appropriated $400 million for a major escalation of covert operations against Iran in late 2007 at President Bush's request. The request allegedly "focused on undermining Iran's nuclear ambitions and trying to undermine the government through regime change", and included new activities such as the funding of opposition groups in the south and east of the country. The article also alleged that Vice President Dick Cheney, after a January 2008 incident in the Strait of Hormuz in which a U.S. warship had nearly fired on Iranian boats, had held a meeting on how to create a casus belli for a war; Hersh later said in an interview that one of the options discussed and rejected was a false flag operation involving Navy SEALs, who would pose as Iranian patrols and start a firefight with U.S. ships. Hersh later began writing a book on Cheney in 2011, on which he spent four years before quitting amid a crackdown on leaks, instead writing his 2018 memoir Reporter.

In his May 2011 article "Iran And the Bomb", Hersh alleged that the U.S. lacked conclusive evidence that Iran was developing nuclear weapons, citing a still-classified National Intelligence Estimate by the National Intelligence Council earlier that year. The summary of the 2007 estimate, which had been released publicly, had found "with high confidence" that Iran had halted its weapons program in late 2003 after the invasion of Iraq; Hersh alleged that the 2011 estimate found that this program had been aimed at Iraq (which Iran had believed to be developing a nuclear weapon), not Israel or the U.S., and that no new evidence had changed the 2007 assessment, despite expanded covert surveillance. In a November 2011 article after the release of a report by the International Atomic Energy Agency (IAEA) on possible military dimensions of Iran's nuclear program, Hersh disputed that the findings were new or transformative, arguing that there remained "no definitive evidence" of a weapons program and calling the report a "political document" in an interview.

=== Syria and chemical attacks ===
In the early weeks of the Iraq War in 2003, Hersh traveled to Damascus in Syria and interviewed President Bashar al-Assad, whom he interviewed several more times in following years, the latest in 2010; he also interviewed Hassan Nasrallah, the leader of Hezbollah. In February 2008, an article by Hersh questioned the Israeli and American claims that a Syrian facility bombed by Israel in September 2007 was an under-construction nuclear reactor; a later report by the IAEA in 2011 found it was "very likely" that it was a secret reactor. An article by Hersh in April 2009, citing his email correspondence with Assad, suggested that Syria was eager for peace with Israel over the Golan Heights, as well as negotiations with the U.S. over its withdrawal from Iraq and Syria's support for Hamas and Hezbollah. Hersh concluded that the Obama administration had a chance for diplomacy with Syria and perhaps Iran.

On December 8, 2013, Hersh's article "Whose sarin?", published in the London Review of Books (LRB), alleged that the Obama administration had "cherry-picked intelligence" on the August 21, 2013, sarin attack at Ghouta during the Syrian Civil War, which had killed hundreds of civilians, in order to attribute the attack to Assad's government and justify a military strike. The article, which had been rejected by The New Yorker and The Washington Post, alleged that U.S. intelligence had found by June 2013 that al-Nusra, a branch of al-Qaeda and part of the Syrian opposition, was also capable of producing and deploying sarin gas. The article cited munitions expert Theodore Postol, who judged that the rockets used in the attack were improvised, and that their estimated range of 2 kilometers (1.2 mi) was inconsistent with a proposed flight path from a Syrian Army base 9 kilometers (5.6 mi) away.

In "The Red Line and the Rat Line", an article published in the LRB in April 2014, Hersh alleged that al-Nusra conducted the attack with the aid of the Turkish government of Recep Tayyip Erdoğan in a false flag operation aimed at drawing the U.S. into the war against Assad. It described an alleged supply chain operation organized by the CIA and the United Kingdom's MI6 with funding from Saudi Arabia and Qatar, which transported weapons to the Syrian rebels from Libya via southern Turkey between early 2012 and the September 2012 attack on the U.S. consulate and CIA annex at Benghazi. Hersh alleged that Turkey's National Intelligence Organization and Gendarmerie had instructed al-Nusra on producing and deploying sarin, and that the planned U.S. strike was averted after British intelligence found that samples of sarin from Ghouta did not match batches from Syria's arsenal.

A United Nations (UN) investigation concluded that sarin had been used at Ghouta, but did not assign responsibility for the attack. Blogger Eliot Higgins and chemical weapons expert Dan Kaszeta disputed some of the claims in the articles with open-source intelligence, writing that the Syrian Army had used the "improvised" rockets as early as November 2012 and that the front lines on the day of the attack were just 2 kilometers (1.2 mi) from the impact sites, within Postol's estimated range. They also criticized the claim of al-Nusra responsibility, citing the high difficulty and expense of producing sarin, and the presence of hexamine in the Ghouta samples, an additive that Syria later declared part of its chemical weapons program.

In his December 2015 LRB article "Military to Military", Hersh alleged that the Joint Chiefs of Staff, after discovering by mid-2013 that Turkey was aiding al-Nusra and the Islamic State (ISIS) and that the moderate rebels were no longer viable, had sabotaged Obama's support for the rebels by sending U.S. intelligence to the militaries of Germany, Russia, and Israel, on the understanding it would be forwarded to Assad. In exchange for this support, aimed at defeating ISIS, Hersh alleged that the Joint Chiefs had required that Assad "restrain" Hezbollah from attacking Israel, restart negotiations with Israel over the Golan Heights, agree to accept Russian advisers, and hold elections after the war. This alleged alliance ended in September 2015 upon the retirement of its architect, chairman General Martin Dempsey. Max Fisher of Vox criticized the narrative, citing reporting that Syria and Russia were primarily bombing anti-ISIS rebels instead of ISIS, and Dempsey's prominent public support for sending more arms to the rebels, over which he had clashed with Obama.

On June 25, 2017, the German newspaper Die Welt published Hersh's article "Trump's Red Line", which had been rejected by the LRB. It alleged that the Syrian Air Force's April 4, 2017, attack at Khan Shaykhun was not a sarin attack but a conventional bombing conducted with Russian intelligence that struck a regional headquarters building with "fertilisers, disinfectants and other goods" in its basement, which created "effects similar to those of sarin". The article further alleged that the April 7 missile strike on Shayrat Airbase, ordered by President Trump, was conducted despite U.S. intelligence affirming a conventional bombing. Higgins again criticized Hersh's claims, writing for Bellingcat that they were inconsistent with Syrian and Russian descriptions of the target and satellite images of the impact sites, as well as findings of sarin and hexamine in samples retrieved by the Organisation for the Prohibition of Chemical Weapons (OPCW). A later investigation by a joint UN–OPCW panel found that the attack was a sarin bombing by the Syrian Air Force.

In the 2025 documentary film Cover-Up, Hersh admits that his Syria reporting was flawed and that he had got the story wrong. Hersh had previously reflected on his Substack about the fall of the Assad regime, admitting that he was too trusting of Assad during their numerous meetings before the outbreak of the Syrian civil war. Asked by Laura Poitras in Cover-Up whether that was "an example of getting too close to power", Hersh replied, "Of course."

=== Killing of Osama bin Laden ===
In a September 2013 interview, Hersh said that the U.S.'s account of the May 2, 2011, raid in Abbottabad, Pakistan, which killed Osama bin Laden was "one big lie, not one word of it is true". He said that both the Obama administration and Pakistan had lied about the event, and that U.S. media outlets were reluctant to challenge the administration: "It's pathetic, they are more than obsequious, they are afraid to pick on this guy [Obama]". Hersh later said that his sources told him that the official story was false days after the raid, but that The New Yorker had rejected his article pitches.

On May 10, 2015, Hersh's article detailing an alternative account of the raid, "The Killing of Osama bin Laden", was published in the London Review of Books. The official account was that bin Laden had been found through interrogation of detainees and surveillance of his courier, that Pakistan was unaware of the operation, and that he was killed only when he did not surrender; Hersh reported that bin Laden had been captured and held as a prisoner of Pakistan's Inter-Services Intelligence (ISI) since 2006, that his location was revealed to the CIA by a former Pakistani intelligence officer in 2010, that top Pakistani military officials knew about the operation, and that bin Laden had been assassinated. The article alleged Pakistan had kept bin Laden, with financial support from Saudi Arabia, as leverage against al-Qaeda, and that it agreed to give him up in exchange for increased U.S. military aid and a "freer hand in Afghanistan". Further allegations were that bin Laden's DNA had been collected by a Pakistani Army doctor, not by Shakil Afridi in a fake vaccination drive by the CIA; that the Navy SEALs met no resistance at the compound, and were escorted by an ISI officer; that bin Laden's body was torn apart by rifle fire; and that pieces of his corpse were tossed out over the Hindu Kush mountains on the flight back to Jalalabad, not buried at sea. A book compiling the article and Hersh's pieces on Syria for the magazine, The Killing of Osama bin Laden, was published in 2016.

Hersh's article was heavily criticized by other reporters. The narrative was similar to a little-known August 2011 post by national security blogger R.J. Hillhouse, who called Hersh's article "either plagiarism or unoriginal", though she speculated they used different sources; Hersh denied having read her work. Max Fisher of Vox said Hersh's story had "internal contradictions" and "troubling inconsistencies", questioning among other claims that the U.S. and Pakistan had struck a secret deal, as U.S. military aid had fallen and relations had deteriorated in following years. Peter Bergen of CNN, who visited the compound after the raid, disputed that the only shots fired were those that killed bin Laden, writing that he had seen evidence of an extended firefight. Both journalists, as well as Jack Shafer at Politico and James Kirchick at Slate, criticized Hersh's sources: an unnamed "retired senior [U.S.] intelligence official", "two longtime consultants to the Special Operations Command", and retired Pakistani General Asad Durrani, who headed the ISI from 1990 to 1992. Fisher wrote that this was "worryingly little evidence for a story that accuses hundreds of people across three governments of staging a massive international hoax that has gone on for years". He also questioned that Pakistan had insisted on an elaborate raid over simpler and lower-risk methods, asking why bin Laden was not killed and his body handed over, or killed in a staged U.S. drone strike. Hersh's article stated that a drone strike was the raid's original cover story before one of the Black Hawk helicopters crashed and was demolished, which was impossible to hide.

Some details in Hersh's article were corroborated by Carlotta Gall of The New York Times, who reported that she had previously been told by a "high-level member" of the ISI that Pakistan had been hiding bin Laden and that an ISI brigadier had informed the CIA of his location; NBC News also corroborated the claim of a retired ISI officer who had tipped off the CIA. Pakistani news outlets alleged the tipster was Brigadier Usman Khalid, who died in 2014. In an article in the Columbia Journalism Review, Trevor Timm, executive director of the Freedom of the Press Foundation, praised an article by Ali Watkins of The Huffington Post as one of the few that identified the tipster development as discrediting the CIA's claim that its torture of detainees had revealed the identity of bin Laden's courier, which had previously been challenged by the December 2014 report on torture by the Senate Intelligence Committee.

=== Nord Stream pipeline and Ukraine ===
On February 8, 2023, in a newsletter article titled "How America Took Out The Nord Stream Pipeline", Hersh alleged that the September 26, 2022, sabotage of the Nord Stream 1 and 2 pipelines, which had carried natural gas from Russia to Germany through the Baltic Sea, was carried out by the U.S. in a top-secret CIA operation ordered by President Joe Biden, with collaboration from Norway. The self-published post, which relied on one anonymous source "with direct knowledge of the operational planning", alleged that U.S. Navy divers operating from a Norwegian ship, using NATO's BALTOPS 22 exercise in June 2022 as cover, had planted C-4 mines which were later remotely detonated by a sonar buoy dropped from a Norwegian plane. The alleged motive was reducing Russian economic influence in Europe and cutting off a major source of state revenue; Nord Stream 2 was not yet operational, but would have doubled the gas supply of Nord Stream 1. Hersh cited statements against the pipeline made by Biden and his foreign policy team as support, including Biden's warning in February 2022, before the Russian invasion of Ukraine, that: "If Russia invades ... there will no longer be a Nord Stream 2. We will bring an end to it."

The party responsible for the attack, which rendered three of the four pipelines inoperable, was not widely known at the time of Hersh's report. Western countries had not formally accused Russia, though some officials suggested it was responsible; Germany, Denmark, and Sweden had each opened investigations into the attack. Russia had accused the United Kingdom's Royal Navy and later the U.S., and disputed the idea it would destroy the pipelines, which it owned a large stake in through Gazprom. Kelly Vlahos, a senior advisor at the Quincy Institute for Responsible Statecraft, described the U.S. mainstream media response to Hersh's post as a "total blackout", and wrote that his reporting "should have opened the floodgates of journalistic inquiry". The post received widespread attention in independent media and European mainstream media, including in Germany; the Bundestag held its first debate on the bombing on February 10, in which members from Alternative for Germany (AfD) and Die Linke cited Hersh and called on the executive branch to release the results of its investigation, which it had said would be kept secret. In Russia, Hersh's report was picked up by the state-owned media agencies RT and TASS. At a UN Security Council meeting on February 21, Russia's representative Vasily Nebenzya cited Hersh and called for an independent UN investigation.

Some of the post's claims were criticized by writers using open-source intelligence. Hersh replied that the open-source location data could have been manipulated by spoofing or disabling transponders. Alexander later wrote that satellite images showed the Hinnøy sailing in formation at six locations, matching AIS data. In March 2023, the New York Times reported that new intelligence suggested a "pro-Ukrainian group" was responsible for the attack, and the German newspaper Die Zeit reported that German police found it was carried out by six people of unclear nationality diving from a yacht rented from a Ukrainian-owned Polish company. In a second post, Hersh alleged that this account was a false flag fabrication created by the CIA and fed to U.S. and German outlets.

In October 2024, the Swiss newspaper Die Weltwoche wrote an article based on an interview given to Danish Politiken by the Christiansø port harbourmaster on the second anniversary of the Nord Stream pipelines sabotage. While the Danish harbourmaster dismissed the many sabotage accusations as conspiracy theories, the Swiss newspaper quoted him that he had sailed out to a fleet of US Navy ships sighted with inactive transponders near the position of the sabotage a few days before the sabotage happened and that the US fleet had requested him to turn around. The Swiss newspaper went on to note that the USS Kearsarge three months earlier had participated in BALTOPS 2022 that exercised unmanned underwater vehicles suitable for demining and other underwater operations, and that as such these vessels could transport explosive charges suitable for blowing the Nord Stream pipelines. The Swiss newspaper claimed this new information calls into question the assumption that a Ukrainian group was responsible for the sabotage and that investigations are continuing.

In an April 2023 article, Hersh alleged that figures in the Ukrainian government of Volodymyr Zelenskyy had embezzled at least $400 million of U.S. aid to the country, intended for the purchase of diesel fuel, by buying discount diesel from Russia, citing an alleged analysis produced by the CIA.

== Other statements ==
=== Speeches ===
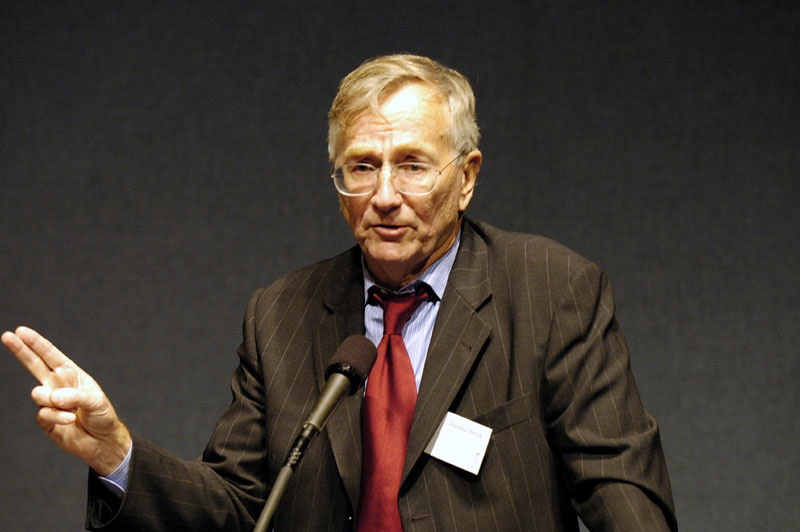
Hersh speaking at the Institute for Policy Studies in 2004

In a 2005 interview with New York magazine, Hersh made a distinction between the strict standards of accuracy observed in his print reporting and the leeway he allowed himself in speeches, in which he spoke informally about stories still being worked on, or changed information to protect his sources: "Sometimes I change events, dates, and places in a certain way to protect people. ... I can't fudge what I write. But I can certainly fudge what I say."

In a July 2004 speech to the American Civil Liberties Union, at the height of the Abu Ghraib scandal, Hersh alleged that there existed video tapes of young boys being sexually assaulted at the prison, in which their "shrieking" could be heard. In his book Chain of Command, however, he clarified that a lawyer in the case had told him about a prisoner witness statement which described the alleged rape of a boy by a foreign contract employee who worked as an interpreter, as a woman was taking pictures. Hersh later stated: "I actually didn't quite say what I wanted to say correctly. ... It wasn't that inaccurate, but it was misstated. The next thing I know, it was all over the blogs."

In a March 2009 speech at the University of Minnesota, Hersh alleged that the Bush administration had authorized the Joint Special Operations Command (JSOC) to locate and kill targets in a program which reported only to Vice President Cheney, outside of the chain of command, in what Hersh described as an "executive assassination ring". In a January 2011 speech in Doha, Qatar, Hersh alleged that General Stanley A. McChrystal, head of the JSOC from 2003 to 2008, and his successor Admiral William H. McRaven were "members, or at least supporters" of the Knights of Malta, a Catholic lay religious order, and that many JSOC officers were members of the Catholic institution Opus Dei; McChrystal denied the allegation. Hersh further alleged that some military leaders viewed the U.S. wars in the Middle East as a "crusade", in which they were protecting Christians from Muslims "[as] in the 13th century".

=== Murder of Seth Rich ===
In a January 2017 phone conversation about the 2016 murder of Democratic National Committee staffer Seth Rich, Hersh told Fox News commentator Ed Butowsky that he had heard about an FBI report which found that Rich had tried to sell emails to WikiLeaks prior to his death. Although cautioned by Hersh that the information may not be true, Butowsky forwarded the taped call to the Rich family, who were encouraged to hire a private investigator quoted in a later-retracted Fox News article on the alleged FBI report. Hersh later said that he had relayed "gossip", and that he was fishing for information.

=== Alleged Pat Nixon abuse ===
In his 2018 autobiography Reporter, Hersh wrote that he had heard in 1974 that Pat Nixon, wife of former president Richard Nixon, had been treated in an emergency room in California after her husband had hit her, and that former Nixon aide John Ehrlichman told him of two previous incidents in which Nixon struck her. Hersh chose not to report on the alleged abuse because he considered it part of Nixon's private life, a decision which he later regretted.

== Use of anonymous sources ==
Hersh's reporting is well known for its use of anonymous sources, which his biographer Robert Miraldi described as his "trademark". While working as a Pentagon correspondent for the AP, he developed many anonymous top- and mid-level military sources, leading Pentagon officials to deride that he "broke every rule of bureaucratic journalism". His AP colleague Richard Pyle later observed that "people were somewhat annoyed that he had no or few names in so many of his stories". Hersh's articles on the Watergate scandal, like those of Bob Woodward and Carl Bernstein, made extensive use of unnamed sources, including deep inside the White House, Justice Department, and Congress. Hersh's New York Times editor A. M. Rosenthal warned him to halt his practice of "ascribing long, colorful pejorative comments in direct quotes to anonymous officials". After Hersh's articles on CIA involvement in the Chilean coup, largely based on unnamed CIA sources, Rosenthal praised his work but again warned about sources: "It's our obligation to be extremely careful, restrained and judicious. Using them puzzles the reader at the best, and raises questions about the credibility of the story at the worst."

Hersh's conservative critics frequently accused him of a left-wing bias in his reporting on the My Lai massacre and later stories. Hersh responded that: "I don't go around getting my stories from nice old Lefties or the Weathermen ... I get them from good old-fashioned constitutionalists. I learned a long time ago that you can't go around making judgments on the basis of people's politics. The essential thing is: Do they have integrity or not?" Henry Kissinger, in response to Hersh's 1983 book The Price of Power, accused him of including "inference piled on assumption, third-hand hearsay accepted as fact, the self-serving accounts of disgruntled adversaries elevated to gospel, the 'impressions' of people several times removed from the scene." Hersh's 1986 book The Target Is Destroyed was especially noted for its anonymous sources, with Hersh admitting that: "This is a book whose key allegations hinge on unnamed sources ... mysterious 'government officials' and 'intelligence analysts'.", and his 1991 book The Samson Option was similar, with journalist Steven Emerson writing in a review that it relied on Hersh's mere reputation: "If anyone else wrote this book, it would have never seen the light of day". Hersh's 1997 book The Dark Side of Camelot used very few unnamed sources, but its document hoax controversy and dubious claims drew the criticism of many in the media, with Kennedy biographer Arthur M. Schlesinger Jr. calling him "the most gullible investigative reporter perhaps in American history".

Hersh's articles for The New Yorker, like his previous articles at the Times under Rosenthal, were reviewed by an active editor (David Remnick) and a team of fact-checkers. In a 2003 interview with the Columbia Journalism Review, Remnick stated that he knew the identity of all of Hersh's sources: "I know every single source that is in his pieces ... Every 'retired intelligence officer', every general with reason to know, and all those phrases that one has to use, alas, by necessity, I say, 'Who is it? What's his interest?' We talk it through." Hersh's reporting on the Middle East after 9/11 drew renewed criticism of his unnamed sources; journalist Amir Taheri wrote in a review of Hersh's 2004 book Chain of Command that: "Hersh uses the method of medieval scholastics: first choose your belief, then seek proofs. ... By my count Hersh has anonymous sources inside 30 foreign governments and virtually every department of the U.S. government." Remnick defended Hersh, arguing that unnamed sources were needed in intelligence reporting due to the risk taken by sources, who faced dismissal or prosecution. Hersh said of his reporting of the "war on terror" that: "[T]he only way you measure my stories in any reasonable way is to say that I've been writing an alternative history of the war. And the question is: Is it basically right? And I think overwhelmingly it's right." Journalist William Arkin, who worked with Hersh in the 1990s, responded to critics of Hersh's errors that: "He can get every fact wrong but get the story correct."

Hersh's reporting outside of The New Yorker has been criticized for allegedly being subjected to less editorial review and fact-checking. Hersh stated that his 2013 article on the Ghouta chemical attack, published in the London Review of Books (LRB), had been rejected because "[Remnick] didn't feel it was strong enough". In 2015, he stated that the LRB had used a former fact-checker from The New Yorker for his article on the killing of Osama bin Laden. Journalist James Kirchick criticized Hersh's later reporting for uncritically treating information provided to him by "cranks", which he wrote were attracted to Hersh because he shared a "conspiratorial" view of the world where "dark, shadowy" forces ruled. Hersh replied that: "There's zero value in taking just the line of government agencies and official spokespeople ... So that makes you reliant on people who have agendas, as all sources usually do, and it attracts people who believe in conspiracies. A lot of intelligence work is finding connections, a bit of an occupational hazard."

Criticism of Hersh and his sources was renewed after his 2017 article on the Khan Shaykhun chemical attack, published by Die Welt after LRB editor Mary-Kay Wilmers told him she "didn't want to be accused of being too pro-Russian and too pro-Syria", and Hersh's 2023 post on the Nord Stream sabotage, which was self-published on Substack and relied on a single anonymous source. Later in 2023, after Hersh cited an alleged U.S. official describing Ukrainian President Volodymyr Zelenskyy as a "poor waif in his underwear", a translation of an idiomatic Russian expression and not otherwise common in English, some commentators speculated that Hersh's source had in fact been Russian-speaking.

== Personal life ==
Seymour Hersh has a fraternal twin brother named Alan Hersh, who is a retired physicist specializing in wave theory who is based in Calabasas, California. He also had two older sisters who were also twins.

In 1964 Seymour Hersh married his college sweetheart, Elizabeth Sarah Klein, a psychoanalyst of Jewish heritage. They have three children: Matthew, Melissa, and Joshua.

== Awards and honors ==
Hersh's journalism and publishing awards include the Pulitzer Prize in 1970, five George Polk Awards, two National Magazine Awards, and more than a dozen other prizes for investigative reporting:

- 1969: George Polk Special Award and Worth Bingham Prize for Investigative Journalism, for reporting on the My Lai massacre (Dispatch News Service)
- 1970: Pulitzer Prize for International Reporting and Sigma Delta Chi Distinguished Service Award, for reporting on the My Lai massacre
- 1973: George Polk Award for Investigative Reporting and Scripps-Howard Public Service Award, for reporting on Operation Menu (The New York Times)
- 1974: George Polk Award for National Reporting, for reporting on Operation CHAOS (The New York Times)
- 1975: Hillman Prize for Newspaper Reporting, for reporting on Operation CHAOS
- 1981: George Polk Award for National Reporting (with Jeff Gerth and Philip Taubman) and Sigma Delta Chi Award, for reporting on arms sales to Libya by former CIA agents (The New York Times)
- 1983: National Book Critics Circle Award for Nonfiction, Los Angeles Times Book Prize for Biography, and Investigative Reporters & Editors Award, for The Price of Power: Kissinger in the Nixon White House
- 1984: Hillman Prize for Book Reporting, for The Price of Power: Kissinger in the Nixon White House
- 1992: Investigative Reporters & Editors Award, for The Samson Option: Israel's Nuclear Arsenal and American Foreign Policy
- 2004: National Magazine Award for Public Interest, for articles on the Bush administration in the lead-up to the Iraq War (The New Yorker); George Polk Award for Magazine Reporting, Overseas Press Club Joe and Laurie Dine Award, National Press Foundation Kiplinger Distinguished Contributions to Journalism Award, Letelier-Moffitt Human Rights Award, and LennonOno Grant for Peace, for reporting on the prisoner abuse at Abu Ghraib (The New Yorker); George Orwell Award for both stories
- 2005: National Magazine Award for Public Interest, for reporting on the prisoner abuse at Abu Ghraib; Ridenhour Courage Prize
- 2009: International Center for Journalists Founders Award for Excellence in Journalism
- 2017: Sam Adams Award

== Publications ==
=== Books ===
- Hersh, Seymour M. (1968). Chemical and Biological Warfare: America's Hidden Arsenal. Indianapolis: Bobbs-Merrill. ISBN 978-0-261-63150-2.
- ——— (1970). My Lai 4: A Report on the Massacre and Its Aftermath. New York: Random House. ISBN 978-0-394-43737-8.
- ——— (1972). Cover-Up: The Army's Secret Investigation of the Massacre at My Lai 4. New York: Random House. ISBN 978-0-394-47460-1.
- ——— (1983). The Price of Power: Kissinger in the Nixon White House. New York: Summit Books. ISBN 978-0-671-44760-1.
- ——— (1986). The Target Is Destroyed: What Really Happened to Flight 007 and What America Knew About It. New York: Random House. ISBN 978-0-394-54261-4.
- ——— (1991). The Samson Option: Israel's Nuclear Arsenal and American Foreign Policy. New York: Random House. ISBN 978-0-394-57006-8.
- ——— (1997). The Dark Side of Camelot. Boston: Little, Brown & Company. ISBN 978-0-316-35955-9.
- ——— (1998). Against All Enemies: Gulf War Syndrome: The War Between America's Ailing Veterans and Their Government. New York: Ballantine Books. ISBN 978-0-345-42748-9.
- ——— (2004). Chain of Command: The Road from 9/11 to Abu Ghraib. New York: HarperCollins. ISBN 978-0-06-019591-5.
- ——— (2016). The Killing of Osama Bin Laden. London: Verso Books. ISBN 978-1-78478-436-2.
- ——— (2018). Reporter: A Memoir. New York: Alfred A. Knopf. ISBN 978-0-307-26395-7.

=== Articles ===
- Articles on the My Lai massacre (St. Louis Post-Dispatch; November 13, 20, and 25, 1969)
- Collected articles for The New Yorker (1971–2015)
- Collected articles for The Atlantic (1982–1994)
- Collected articles for the London Review of Books (2013–2019)
