= Mary Mapes =

American television producer and journalist

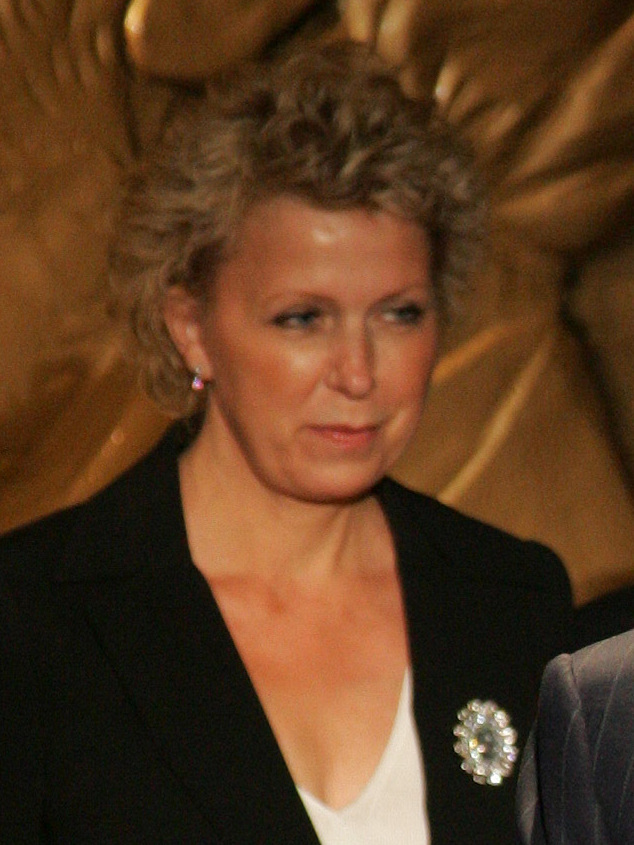
- Mary Mapes in 2005
- Born: Mary Alice Mapes; May 9, 1956 (age 70); Burlington, Washington, U.S.
- Occupations: Journalist, producer
- Spouse: Mark Wrolstad (1987–present)

Mary Alice Mapes (born May 9, 1956) is an American journalist, former television news producer, and author. She was a principal producer for CBS News, primarily the CBS Evening News and primetime television program 60 Minutes Wednesday. She is known for the story of the Abu Ghraib torture and prisoner abuse scandal, which won a Peabody Award, and the story of Senator Strom Thurmond's unacknowledged biracial daughter, Essie Mae Washington. In 2005, she was fired from CBS for her part in the Killian documents controversy.

== Early life ==
Mapes was born on May 9, 1956, in Burlington, Washington and grew up there with four sisters. Both of her parents were Republicans. After graduating from Burlington-Edison High School in 1974, Mapes studied communications and political science at the University of Washington. After earning her degrees, she worked at CBS affiliate KIRO-TV in Seattle during the 1980s. While a producer there, she met her future husband, KIRO reporter Mark Wrolstad, and they married in 1987.

== At CBS ==
In 1989, Mapes went to work for CBS News in Dallas, Texas. She was hired by CBS in 1999 as a producer assigned to Dan Rather and the program 60 Minutes Wednesday.

At 60 Minutes Wednesday, Mapes produced the story that announced the US Army's investigation of the Abu Ghraib prison scandal, and the story that exposed Strom Thurmond's unacknowledged bi-racial daughter, Essie Mae Washington, winning a Peabody Award in 2005 for the former.

=== Killian documents controversy ===
Mary Mapes produced a segment for 60 Minutes Wednesday that aired criticism of President George W. Bush's military service, supported by documents purportedly from the files of Bush's commanding officer, the late Lieutenant Colonel Jerry B Killian. Those documents had been delivered to CBS from Bill Burkett, who was a retired Lt. Colonel with the Texas Army National Guard. During the segment, Dan Rather asserted that the documents had been authenticated by document experts, but ultimately, CBS could neither confirm nor definitively refute their authenticity. Moreover, CBS did not have any original documents, only faxed copies, as Burkett claimed to have burned the originals.

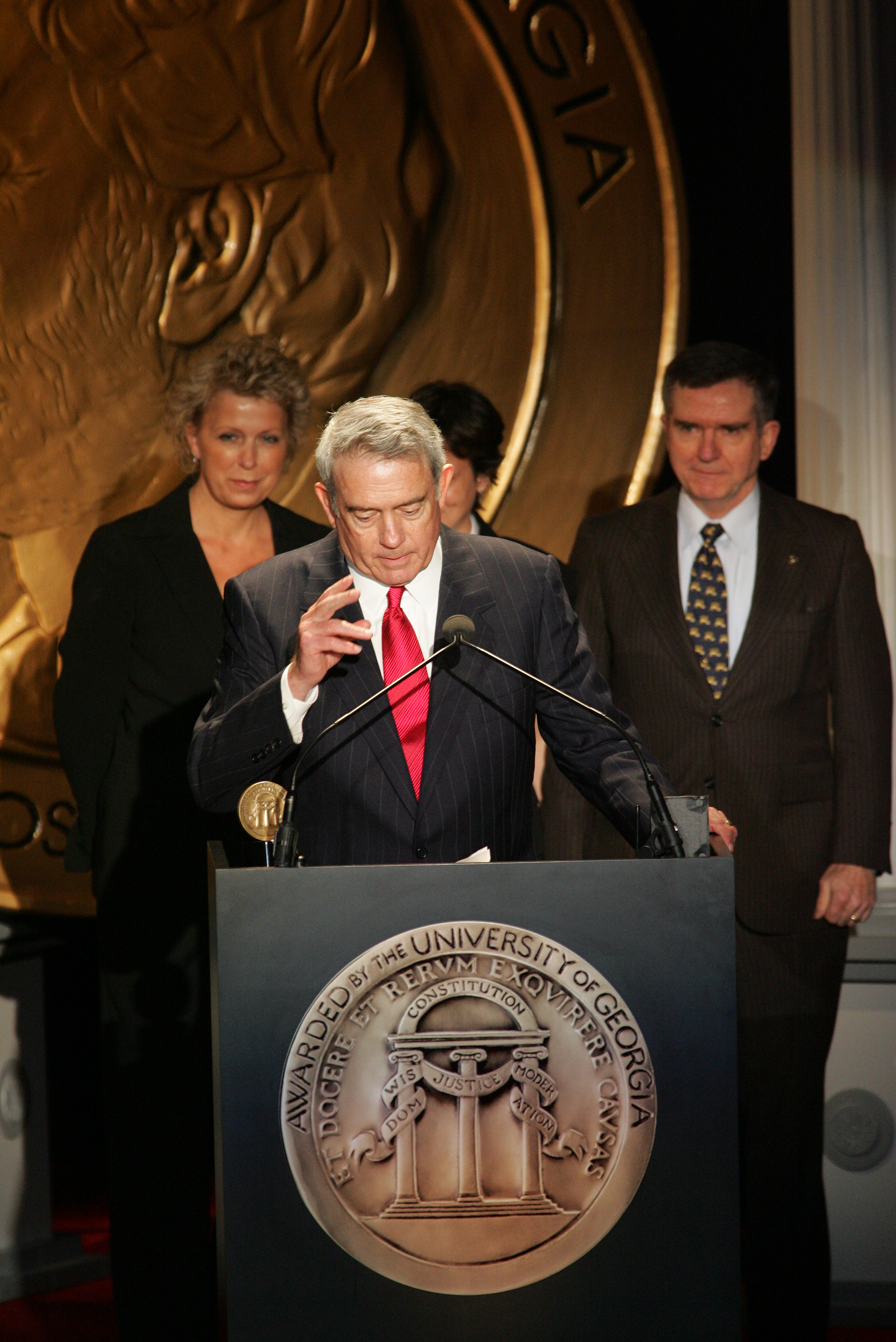
Mary Mapes, Dan Rather, and Roger G. Charles accept the Peabody Award, May 2005

The 60 Minutes report charged that Bush, the son of an ambassador, congressman and future president, had received preferential treatment whereby hundreds of other applicants to the Texas Air National Guard were unjustly passed over in favor of his own. Then-Texas Lieutenant Governor Ben Barnes said he had made phone calls to get Bush into the Guard.

After the report was aired, it was immediately the subject of harsh criticism, especially when a key document could not be authenticated. As a result of the controversy over the use of the documents, CBS ordered an independent internal investigation. The panel in charge of investigation was composed of Dick Thornburgh, former governor of Pennsylvania and United States Attorney General in the George H. W. Bush administration, and Louis Boccardi, retired president and CEO of the Associated Press. The Thornburgh-Boccardi report said that some of Bush's former instructors or colleagues had told Mapes that Bush told them he wanted to go to Vietnam, but that he could not go because there were others ahead of him with more seniority.

Mapes was criticized for failing to air them in the 60 Minutes report to balance the allegation that Bush had applied for service in the Guard to avoid serving in Vietnam. Mapes was also faulted for calling Joe Lockhart, a senior official in the John Kerry campaign, before the piece ran on the air and offering to put Bill Burkett in contact with Lockhart. However, Mapes stated that Burkett had asked her to give his phone number to someone in the Kerry camp to discuss the Swift Boat campaign for which she had asked permission. She has said, in retrospect, she would not have done it. Lockhart and Burkett also stated that the conversation had nothing to do with CBS's report or the documents, but had to do with the Swift Boat campaign.

Following the investigation, Mapes and others at CBS were accused of lapses in judgment. She was then fired from CBS because of the scandal, ending her 15-year tenure at the network.

Although the panel did not determine the memos were fraudulent, it stated "there remains substantial questions" regarding their authenticity. According to the panel, a "myopic zeal" to be the first news outlet to broadcast an unprecedented story about the president's National Guard service was a "key factor in explaining why CBS News had produced a story that was neither fair nor accurate and did not meet the organization's internal standards." The panel proclaimed that at least four factors contributed to the decision to broadcast the report: "The combination of a new 60 Minutes Wednesday management team, great deference given to a highly respected producer and the network's news anchor, competitive pressures, and a zealous belief in the truth of the segment". The panel also stated that it "cannot conclude that a political agenda at 60 Minutes Wednesday drove either the timing of the airing of the segment or its content." Mapes was terminated by CBS in January 2005. Asked to resign were Senior Vice President Betsy West, who supervised CBS News primetime programs; 60 Minutes Wednesday Executive Producer Josh Howard; and Howard's deputy, Senior Broadcast Producer Mary Murphy.

Mapes said she did not think her actions were faultless, but she stood by the story. She said that the authenticity of the documents had been corroborated by an unnamed key source and that journalists often have to rely on photo-copied documents as the basis for verifying a story. Moreover, Burkett admitted lying to Mapes and the 60 Minutes team regarding the source of the documents.

In an interview with The Washington Post, Mapes said Karl Rove was "an inspirational figure" for the critics of the segment. Rove called Mapes' work "the gift that keeps on giving" due to the story's lurid foundations and the apparent boost it gave to Bush during his reelection campaign. Some Democratic critics of Bush, such as Terry McAuliffe and Maurice Hinchey, suggested that the memos originated from the Bush campaign with the purpose of discrediting the media's unveiling of Bush's National Guard service and changing the conversation from subjects like the Iraq War, singling out Rove, Ralph Reed and Roger Stone. Rove and Stone denied involvement.

== Book and film adaptation ==
In 2005, Mapes' book Truth and Duty: The Press, the President, and the Privilege of Power was published. It was adapted into the 2015 film Truth, about the Killian documents controversy, starring Cate Blanchett as Mapes and Robert Redford as Dan Rather.

== Writing career ==
In the aftermath of the CBS scandal, Mapes started work as a writer and a consultant, contributing to the news magazine The Nation in 2007 and 2008.

In the May 2016 edition of D Magazine, Mapes wrote a story about Henry Wade's 1954 conviction of Tommy Lee Walker.
