= Killian documents controversy =

2004 American political controversy

Charles Foster Johnson's animated GIF image comparing a memo purportedly typewritten in 1973 with a proportional-spaced document made in Microsoft Word with default settings in 2004

The Killian documents controversy (also referred to as Memogate or Rathergate) involved six documents containing false allegations about George W. Bush's service in the Texas Air National Guard in 1972–73, allegedly typed in 1973. Dan Rather presented four of these documents as authentic in a 60 Minutes II broadcast aired by CBS on September 8, 2004, less than two months before the 2004 presidential election, but it was later found that CBS had failed to authenticate them. Several typewriter and typography experts soon concluded that they were forgeries. Lieutenant Colonel Bill Burkett provided the documents to CBS, but he claims to have burned the originals after faxing them copies.

The documents describe preferential treatment during Bush's service, including pressure on Lt. Col. Jerry B. Killian, commander of the 111th Fighter Squadron, to "sugar coat" an annual officer rating report for the then 1st Lt. Bush.

CBS News producer Mary Mapes obtained the copied documents from Burkett, a former officer in the Texas Army National Guard, while pursuing a story about the George W. Bush military service controversy. Burkett claimed that Bush's commander, Lieutenant Colonel Jerry B. Killian, wrote them, which included criticisms of Bush's service in the Guard during the 1970s. In the 60 Minutes segment, Rather stated that the documents "were taken from Lieutenant Colonel Killian's personal files", and he falsely asserted that they had been authenticated by experts retained by CBS.

The authenticity of the documents was challenged within minutes on Internet forums and blogs, with questions initially focused on anachronisms in the format and typography, and the scandal quickly spread to the mass media. CBS and Rather defended the authenticity and usage of the documents for two weeks, but other news organizations continued to scrutinize the evidence, and USA Today obtained an independent analysis from outside experts. CBS finally repudiated the use of the documents on September 20, 2004. Rather stated, "if I knew then what I know now – I would not have gone ahead with the story as it was aired, and I certainly would not have used the documents in question", and CBS News President Andrew Heyward said, "Based on what we now know, CBS News cannot prove that the documents are authentic, which is the only acceptable journalistic standard to justify using them in the report. We should not have used them. That was a mistake, which we deeply regret."

Several months later, a CBS-appointed panel led by Dick Thornburgh and Louis Boccardi criticized both the initial CBS news segment and CBS's "strident defense" during the aftermath. CBS fired producer Mapes, requested resignations from several senior news executives, and apologized to viewers by saying that there were "substantial questions regarding the authenticity of the Killian documents".

The controversy was dramatized in the film Truth starring Robert Redford as Dan Rather and Cate Blanchett as Mary Mapes, based on Mapes' memoir Truth and Duty. Former CBS President and CEO Les Moonves refused to approve the film, and CBS refused to air advertisements for it. A CBS spokesman stated that it contained "too many distortions, evasions, and baseless conspiracy theories".

== Background and timeline ==
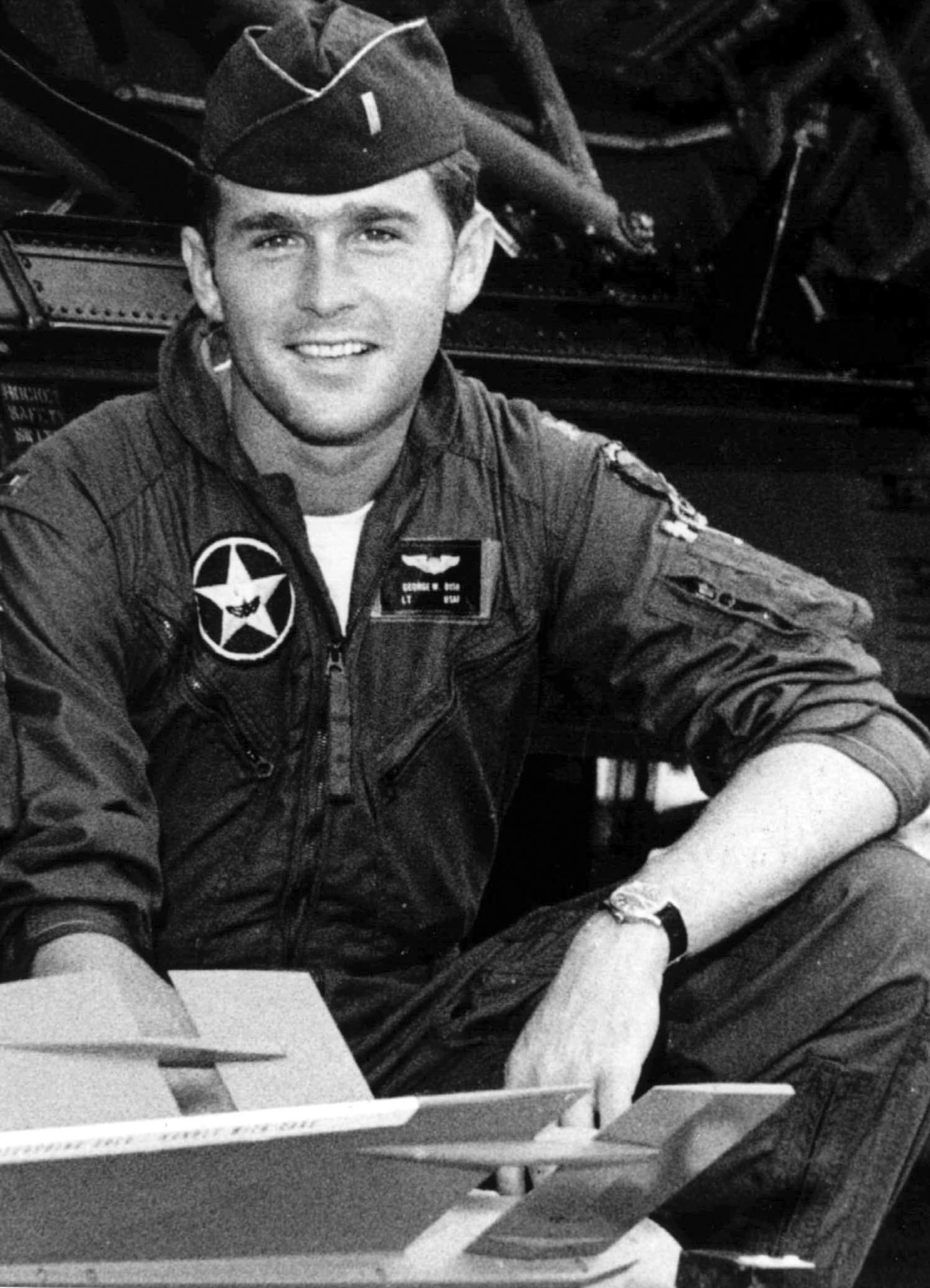
1st Lieutenant George W. Bush in uniform. Investigations into his military service led to the Killian documents controversy.

The memos, allegedly written in 1972 and 1973, were obtained by CBS News producer Mary Mapes and freelance journalist Michael Smith from Lieutenant Colonel Bill Burkett, a former US Army National Guard officer. Mapes and Dan Rather, among many other journalists, had been investigating for several years the story of Bush's alleged failure to fulfill his obligations to the National Guard.

Burkett had received publicity in 2000, after making and then retracting a claim that he had been transferred to Panama for refusing "to falsify personnel records of [then-]Governor Bush", and in February 2004, when he claimed to know about "scrubbing" of Bush's Texas Air National Guard records. Mapes was "by her own account [aware that] many in the press considered Burkett an 'anti-Bush zealot', his credibility in question".

Mapes and Smith made contact with Burkett in late August, and on August 24 Burkett offered to meet with them to share the documents he possessed, and later told reporters from USA Today "that he had agreed to turn over the documents to CBS if the network would arrange a conversation with the Kerry campaign", a claim substantiated by emails between Smith and Mapes detailing Burkett's additional requests for help with negotiating a book deal, security, and financial compensation. During the last week of August, Mapes asked Josh Howard, her immediate superior at CBS, for permission to facilitate contact between Burkett and the Kerry campaign; Howard and Mapes subsequently disputed whether such permission had been given.

Two documents were provided by Burkett to Mapes on September 2, and four others on September 5, 2004. At that time, Burkett told Mapes that they were copies of originals that had been obtained from Killian's personal files via Chief Warrant officer George Conn, another former member of the TexANG.

Mapes informed Rather of the progress of the story, which was being targeted to air on September 8 along with footage of an interview with Ben Barnes, a former Lieutenant Governor of Texas, who would publicly state for the first time his opinion that Bush had received preferential treatment to get into the National Guard. Mapes had also been in contact with the Kerry campaign several times between late August and September 6, when she spoke with senior Kerry advisor Joe Lockhart regarding the progressing story. Lockhart subsequently stated he was "wary" of contact with Mapes at this stage, because if the story were true, his involvement might undermine its credibility, and if it were false, "he did not want to be associated with it". Lockhart called Burkett on September 6 at the number provided by Mapes, and both men stated they discussed Burkett's view of Kerry's presidential campaign strategy, not the existence of the documents or the related story.

=== Content of the memos ===
The documents claimed that Bush had disobeyed orders while in the Guard and that undue influence had been exerted on Bush's behalf to improve his record. The documents included the following:

1. An order directing Bush to submit to a physical examination.
2. A note that Killian had grounded Bush from flying due to "failure to perform to USAF / TexANG standards", and for failure to submit to the physical examination as ordered. Killian also requested that a flight inquiry board be convened, as required by regulations, to examine the reasons for Bush's loss of flight status.
3. A note of a telephone conversation with Bush in which Bush sought to be excused from "drill". The note records that Bush said he did not have the time to attend to his National Guard duties because he had a campaign to do (the Senate campaign of Winton M. Blount in Alabama).
4. A note (labeled "CYA" for "cover your ass") claiming that Killian was being pressured from above to give Bush better marks in his yearly evaluation than he had earned. The note attributed to Killian says that he was being asked to "sugarcoat" Bush's performance. "I'm having trouble running interference [for Bush] and doing my job."

USA Today also received copies of the four documents used by CBS, reporting this and publishing them the morning after the CBS segment, along with two additional memos. Burkett was assured by USA Today that they would keep the source confidential.

=== CBS investigations before airing the segment ===
Mapes and her colleagues began interviewing people who might be able to corroborate the information in the documents, while also retaining four forensic document experts, Marcel J. Matley, James J. Pierce, Emily Will, and Linda James, to determine the validity of the memos.

On September 5, CBS interviewed Killian's friend Robert Strong, who ran the Texas Air National Guard administrative office. Among other issues covered in his interview with Rather and Mapes, Strong was asked if he thought the documents were genuine. Strong stated, "they are compatible with the way business was done at the time. They are compatible with the man that I remember Jerry Killian being." Strong had first seen the documents twenty minutes earlier and also said he had no personal knowledge of their content; he later claimed he had been told to assume the content of the documents was accurate.

On September 6, CBS interviewed General Robert "Bobby" Hodges, a former officer at the Texas Air National Guard and Killian's immediate superior at the time. Hodges declined CBS' request for an on-camera interview, and Mapes read the documents to him over the telephone—or perhaps only portions of the documents; his recollection and Mapes's differed. According to Mapes, Hodges agreed with CBS's assessment that the documents were real, and CBS reported that Hodges stated that these were "the things that Killian had expressed to me at the time". However, according to Hodges, when Mapes read portions of the memos to him he simply stated, "well if he wrote them, that's what he felt", and he stated he never confirmed the validity of the content of the documents. General Hodges later asserted to the investigatory panel that he told Mapes that Killian had never, to his knowledge, ordered anyone to take a physical and that he had never been pressured regarding Lieutenant Bush, as the documents alleged. Hodges also claims that when CBS interviewed him, he thought the memos were handwritten, not typed, and following the September 8 broadcast, when Hodges had seen the documents and heard of claims of forgery by Killian's wife and son, he was "convinced they were not authentic" and told Rather and Mapes on September 10.

=== Response of the document examiners ===
Before airing, all four of the examiners responded to Mapes' request for document analysis, though only two to Mapes directly:

- Emily Will noted discrepancies in the signatures on the memos, and had questions about the letterhead, the proportional spacing of the font, the superscripted "th", and the improper formatting of the date. Will requested other documents to use for comparison.
- Linda James was "unable to reach a conclusion about the signature" and noted that the superscripted "th" was not in common use at the time the memos were allegedly written; she later recalled telling CBS, "the two memos she looked at 'had problems.'"
- James Pierce concluded that both of the documents were written by the same person and that the signature matched Killian's from the official Bush records. Only one of the two documents provided to Pierce had a signature. James Pierce wrote, "the balance of the Jerry B. Killian signatures appearing on the photocopied questioned documents are consistent and in basic agreement", and stated that based on what he knew, "the documents in question are authentic". However, Pierce also told Mapes he could not be sure if the documents had been altered because he was reviewing copies, not original documents.
- Marcel Matley's review was initially limited to Killian's signature on one of the Burkett documents, which he compared to signatures from the official Bush records. Matley "seemed fairly confident" that the signature was Killian's. On September 6, Matley was interviewed by Rather and Mapes and was provided with the other four documents obtained from CBS (he would prove to be the only reviewer to see these documents before the segment). Matley told Rather, "he could not authenticate the documents due to the fact that they were poor quality copies". In the interview, Matley told Rather that with respect to the signatures, they were relying on "poor material" and that there were inconsistencies in the signatures, but also replied "Yes", when asked if it would be safe to say the documents were written by the person who signed them.
- Both Emily Will and Linda James suggested to Mapes that CBS contact typewriter expert Peter Tytell (son of Martin Tytell) to review the documents. Associate producer Yvonne Miller left him a voicemail on September 7; he returned the call at 11 am on September 8 but was told they "did not need him anymore".

== September 8 segment and initial reactions ==
The segment entitled "For the Record" aired on 60 Minutes II on September 8. After introducing the documents, Rather said, in reference to Matley, "We consulted a handwriting analyst and document expert who believes the material is authentic."

The segment introduced Lieutenant Robert Strong's interview, describing him as a "friend of Killian" (without noting he had not worked in the same location and without mentioning he had left the TexANG before the dates on the memos). The segment used the sound bite of Strong saying the documents were compatible with how business was done, but did not include a disclaimer that Strong was told to assume the documents were authentic.

In Rather's narration about one of the memos, he referred to pressure being applied on Bush's behalf by General Buck Staudt, and described Staudt as "the man in charge of the Texas National Guard". Staudt had retired from the guard a year and a half before the dates of the memos.

Interview clips with Ben Barnes, former Speaker of the Texas House, created the impression "that there was no question but that Bush had received Barnes' help to get into the TexANG", because Barnes had made a telephone call on Bush's behalf, when Barnes himself had acknowledged that there was no proof his call was the reason, and that "sometimes a call to General Rose did not work". Barnes' disclaimer was not included in the segment.

=== Internet skepticism spreads ===
Discussion quickly spread to various weblogs in the blogosphere, principally Little Green Footballs and Power Line. The initial analysis appeared in posts by "Buckhead", a username of Harry W. MacDougald, an Atlanta attorney who had worked for conservative groups such as the Federalist Society and the Southeastern Legal Foundation, and who had helped draft the petition to the Arkansas Supreme Court for the disbarment of Bill Clinton. MacDougald questioned the validity of the documents on the basis of their typography, writing that the memos were "in a proportionally spaced font, probably Palatino or Times New Roman", and alleging that this was an anachronism, as in 1973 such documents would have been produced on a typewriter in a monospaced font: "I am saying these documents are forgeries, run through a copier for 15 generations to make them look old. This should be pursued aggressively."

By the following day, questions about the authenticity of the documents were being publicized by the Drudge Report, which linked to the analysis at the Powerline blog in the mid-afternoon, and the story was covered on the website of the magazine The Weekly Standard and broke into mass media outlets, including the Associated Press and the major television news networks. It also was receiving serious attention from conservative writers such as National Review Online's Jim Geraghty. By the afternoon of September 9, Charles Foster Johnson of Little Green Footballs had posted his attempt to recreate one of the documents using Microsoft Word with the default settings. The September 9 edition of ABC's Nightline made mention of the controversy, along with an article on the ABC News website.

Thirteen days after this controversy had emerged, the national newspaper USA Today published a timeline of events surrounding the CBS story. Accordingly, on the September 9 morning after the 60 Minutes II report, the broadcast was front-page news in the New York Times and Washington Post. Additionally, the story was given two-thirds of a full page within USA Today's news section, which mentioned that it had also obtained copies of the documents. However, the authenticity of the memos was not part of the story carried by major news outlets on that day. Also on that day, CBS published the reaction of Killian's son, Gary, to the documents, reporting that Gary Killian questioned one of the memos but stated that others "appeared legitimate" and characterized the collection as "a mixture of truth and fiction". In an interview with Fox News, Gary Killian expressed doubts about the documents' authenticity based on his father's positive view of Bush.

In 2006, the two Free Republic (Rathergate) bloggers, Harry W. MacDougald, username "Buckhead", an Atlanta-based lawyer and Paul Boley, username "TankerKC", were awarded the Reed Irvine Award for New Media by the Accuracy in Media watchdog at the Conservative Political Action Conference (CPAC).

=== CBS's response and widening media coverage ===
At 5:00 p.m. on Thursday, September 9, CBS News released a statement saying the memos were "thoroughly investigated by independent experts, and we are convinced of their authenticity", and stating, "this report was not based solely on recovered documents, but rather on a preponderance of evidence, including documents that were provided by unimpeachable sources". The statement was replaced later that day with one that omitted this claim.

The first newspaper articles questioning the documents appeared on September 10 in The Washington Post, The New York Times and in USA Today via the Associated Press. The Associated Press reported, "Document examiner Sandra Ramsey Lines ... said she was 'virtually certain' [the documents] were generated by computer. Lines said that meant she could testify in court that, beyond a reasonable doubt, her opinion was that the memos were written on a computer."

Also on September 10, The Dallas Morning News reported, "the officer named in one memo as exerting pressure to 'sugarcoat' Bush's military record was discharged a year and a half before the memo was written. The paper cited a military record showing that Col. Walter 'Buck' Staudt was honorably discharged on March 1, 1972, while the memo cited by CBS as showing that Staudt was interfering with evaluations of Bush was dated August 18, 1973."

In response to the media attention, a CBS memo said that the documents were "backed up not only by independent handwriting and forensic document experts but by sources familiar with their content" and insisted that no internal investigation would take place. On the CBS Evening News of September 10, Rather defended the story and noted that its critics included "partisan political operatives".

- In the broadcast, Rather stated that Marcel Matley "analyzed the documents for CBS News. He believes they are real", and broadcast additional excerpts from Matley's September 6 interview showing Matley's agreement that the signatures appeared to be from the same source. Rather did not report that Matley had referred to them as "poor material", that he had only opined about the signatures, or that he had specifically not authenticated the documents.
- Rather presented footage of the Strong interview, introducing it by stating Robert Strong "is standing by his judgment that the documents are real", despite Strong's lack of standing to authenticate them and his brief exposure to the documents.
- Rather concluded by stating, "If any definitive evidence to the contrary of our story is found, we will report it. So far, there is none."

In an appearance on CNN that day, Rather asserted, "I know that this story is true. I believe that the witnesses and the documents are authentic. We wouldn't have gone to the air if they had not been."

However, CBS's Josh Howard spoke at length by telephone with typewriter expert Peter Tytell and later told the panel that the discussion was "an 'unsettling event' that shook his belief in the authenticity of the documents". Producer Mapes dismissed Tytell's concerns.

A former vice president of CBS News, Jonathan Klein, dismissed the allegations of bloggers, suggesting that the "checks and balances" of a professional news organization were superior to those of individuals sitting at their home computers "in their pajamas".

== CBS's defense, apology ==
As media coverage widened and intensified, CBS at first attempted to produce additional evidence to support its claims. On September 11, a CBS News segment stated that document expert Phillip Bouffard thought the documents "could have been prepared on an IBM Selectric Composer typewriter, available at the time". The Selectric Composer was introduced in 1966 for use by typesetting professionals to generate camera-ready copy; according to IBM archives describing this specialized equipment, "To produce copy which can be reproduced with 'justified', or straight left-and right-hand margins, the operator types the copy once and the composer computes the number of spaces needed to justify the line. As the operator types the copy a second time, the spaces are added automatically." Bouffard's comments were also cited by the Boston Globe in an article entitled "Authenticity backed on Bush documents". However, the Globe soon printed a retraction regarding the title. CBS noted that although General Hodges was now stating he thought the documents were inauthentic, "we believed General Hodges the first time we spoke with him." CBS reiterated: "we believe the documents to be genuine".

By September 13, CBS's position had shifted slightly, as Rather acknowledged "some of these questions come from people who are not active political partisans", and stated that CBS "talked to handwriting and document analysts and other experts who strongly insist the documents could have been created in the '70s". The analysts and experts cited by Rather did not include the original four consulted by CBS. Rather, instead presented the views of Bill Glennon and Richard Katz. Glennon, a former typewriter repairman with no specific credentials in typesetting beyond that job, was found by CBS after posting several defenses of the memos on blogs including Daily Kos and Kevin Drum's blog hosted at Washington Monthly. However, in the actual broadcast, neither interviewee asserted that the memos were genuine.

As a result, some CBS critics began to accuse CBS of expert shopping.

=== 60 Minutes II, one week later ===
The original document examiners, however, continued to be part of the story. By September 15, Emily Will was publicly stating that she had told CBS that she had doubts about both the production of the memos and the handwriting before the segment. Linda James stated that the memos were of "very poor quality" and that she did not authenticate them, telling ABC News, "I did not authenticate anything and I don't want it understood that I did."

In response, 60 Minutes II released a statement suggesting that Will and James had "misrepresented" their role in the authentication of the documents and had played only a small part in the process. CBS News concurrently amended its previous claim that Matley had authenticated the documents, saying instead that he had authenticated only the signatures. On CNN, Matley stated he had only verified that the signatures were "from the same source", not that they were authentically Killian's: "When I saw the documents, I could not verify the documents were authentic or inauthentic. I could only verify that the signatures came from the same source", Matley said. "I could not authenticate the documents themselves. But at the same time, there was nothing to tell me that they were not authentic."

On the evening of September 15, CBS aired a segment that featured an interview with Marian Carr Knox, a secretary at Ellington Air Force Base from 1956 to 1979, and who was Killian's assistant on the dates shown in the documents. Dan Rather prefaced the segment on the recorded interview by stating, "She told us she believes what the documents actually say is, exactly, as we reported." In the aired interview, Knox expressed her belief that the documents reflected Killian's "sentiments" about Bush's service, and that this belief motivated her decision to reach out to CBS to provide the interview. In response to a direct question from Rather about the authenticity of the memo on Bush's alleged insubordination, she stated that no such memo was ever written; she further emphasized that she would have known if such a memo existed, as she had sole responsibility to type Killian's memos in that time period. At this point, she also admitted she had no firsthand knowledge of Bush's time in the Guard. However, controversially, Knox said later in the interview, "The information in here was correct, but it was picked up from the real ones." She went on to say, "I probably typed the information and somebody picked up the information some way or another." The New York Times' headline report on this interview, including the phrase "Fake but Accurate", created an immediate backlash from critics of CBS's broadcast. The conservative-leaning Weekly Standard proceeded to predict the end of CBS's news division.

At this time, Dan Rather first acknowledged there were problems in establishing the validity of the documents used in the report, stating: "If the documents are not what we were led to believe, I'd like to break that story."

Copies of the documents were first released to the public by the White House. Press Secretary Scott McClellan stated that the memos had been provided to them by CBS in the days before the report and that, "We had every reason to believe that they were authentic at that time."

The Washington Post reported that at least one of the documents obtained by CBS had a fax header indicating it had been faxed from a Kinko's copy center in Abilene, Texas, leading some to trace the documents back to Burkett.

=== CBS states that use of the documents was a mistake ===
As a growing number of independent document examiners and competing news outlets reported their findings about the documents, CBS News stopped defending the documents and began to report on the problems with their story. On September 20, they reported that their source, Bill Burkett, "admits that he deliberately misled the CBS News producer working on the report, giving her a false account of the documents' origins to protect a promise of confidentiality to the actual source." While the network did not state that the memos were forgeries, CBS News president Andrew Heyward said,

Based on what we now know, CBS News cannot prove that the documents are authentic, which is the only acceptable journalistic standard to justify using them in the report. We should not have used them. That was a mistake, which we deeply regret.

Dan Rather stated, "if I knew then what I know now – I would not have gone ahead with the story as it was aired, and I certainly would not have used the documents in question."

In an interview with Rather, Burkett admitted that he misled CBS about the source of the documents, and then claimed that the documents came to him from someone he claimed was named "Lucy Ramirez", whom CBS was unable to contact or identify as an actual person. Burkett said he then made copies at the local Kinko's and burned the original documents. Investigations by CBS, CNN, and the Washington Post failed to turn up evidence of "Lucy Ramirez" being an actual person.

On September 21, CBS News addressed the contact with the Kerry campaign in its statement, saying, "it is obviously against CBS News standards and those of every other reputable news organization to be associated with any political agenda."

The next day, the network announced it was forming an independent review panel to perform an internal investigation.

== Review panel established ==
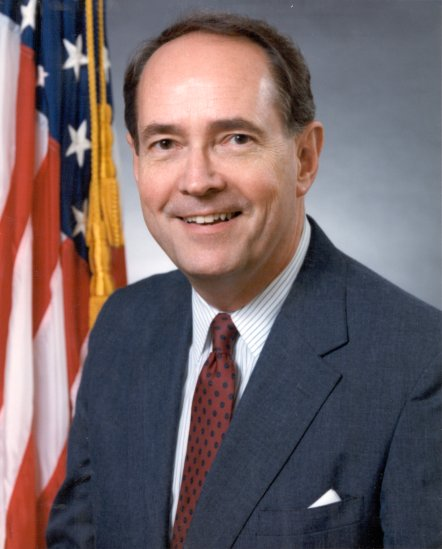
Dick Thornburgh, named by CBS to investigate with Louis Boccardi the events that led to the CBS report

Soon after, CBS established a review panel "to help determine what errors occurred in the preparation of the report and what actions need to be taken". Dick Thornburgh, a Republican former governor of Pennsylvania and United States Attorney General under George H.W. Bush, and Louis Boccardi, retired president and chief executive officer and former executive editor of the Associated Press, made up the two-person review board. CBS also hired a private investigator, former FBI agent Erik T. Rigler, to gather further information about the story.

=== Findings ===
On January 5, 2005, the Report of the Independent Review Panel on the September 8, 2004, 60 Minutes Wednesday segment "For the Record Concerning President Bush's Air National Guard Service" was released. The purpose of the panel was to examine the process by which the September 8 segment was prepared and broadcast, to examine the circumstances surrounding the subsequent public statements and news reports by CBS News defending the segment, and to make any recommendations it deemed appropriate. Among the Panel's conclusions were the following:

The most serious defects in the reporting and production of the September 8 segment were:
1. The failure to obtain clear authentication of any of the Killian documents from any document examiner;
2. The false statement in the September 8 segment that an expert had authenticated the Killian documents when all he had done was authenticate one signature from one document used in the segment;
3. The failure of 60 Minutes Wednesday management to scrutinize the publicly available, and at times controversial, background of the source of the documents, retired Texas Army National Guard Lieutenant Colonel Bill Burkett;
4. The failure to find and interview the individual who was understood at the outset to be Lieutenant Colonel Burkett's source of the Killian documents, and thus to establish the chain of custody;
5. The failure to establish a basis for the statement in the segment that the documents "were taken from Colonel Killian's personal files";
6. The failure to develop adequate corroboration to support the statements in the Killian documents and to carefully compare the Killian documents to official TexANG records, which would have identified, at a minimum, notable inconsistencies in content and format;
7. The failure to interview a range of former National Guardsmen who served with Lieutenant Colonel Killian and who had different perspectives about the documents;
8. The misleading impression conveyed in the segment that Lieutenant Strong had authenticated the content of the documents when he did not have the personal knowledge to do so;
9. The failure to have a vetting process capable of dealing effectively with the production speed, significance, and sensitivity of the segment; and
10. The telephone call before the segment's airing by the producer of the segment to a senior campaign official of Democratic presidential candidate John Kerry – a clear conflict of interest – that created the appearance of a political bias.

Once questions were raised about the September 8 segment, the reporting thereafter was mishandled and compounded the damage done. Among the more egregious shortcomings during the Aftermath were:
1. The strident defense of the September 8 segment by CBS News without adequately probing whether any of the questions raised had merit;
2. Allowing many of the same individuals who produced and vetted the by-then controversial September 8 segment to also produce the follow-up news reports defending the segment;
3. The inaccurate press statements issued by CBS News after the broadcast of the segment that the source of the documents was "unimpeachable" and that experts had vouched for their authenticity;
4. The misleading stories defending the segment that aired on the CBS Evening News after September 8, despite strong and multiple indications of serious flaws;
5. The efforts by 60 Minutes Wednesday to find additional document examiners who would vouch for the authenticity of the documents, instead of identifying the best examiners available, regardless of whether they would support this position; and
6. Preparing news stories that sought to support the segment, instead of providing accurate and balanced coverage of a raging controversy.

=== Panel's view of the documents ===
The Panel did not undertake a thorough examination of the authenticity of the Killian documents, but consulted Peter Tytell, a New York City-based forensic document examiner and typewriter and typography expert. Tytell had been contacted by 60 Minutes producers before the broadcast, and had informed associate producer Yvonne Miller and executive producer Josh Howard on September 10 that he believed the documents were forgeries. The Panel report stated, "The Panel met with Peter Tytell, and found his analysis sound in terms of why he thought the documents were not authentic ... The Panel does not conclude as to whether Tytell was correct in all respects."

== Aftermath ==
The controversy had long-reaching personal, political, and legal consequences. In a 2010 issue of TV Guide, Rather's report was ranked No. 3 on a list of TV's ten biggest "blunders".

=== CBS personnel and programming changes ===
CBS terminated Mary Mapes and demanded the resignations of 60 Minutes Wednesday Executive Producer Josh Howard and Howard's top deputy, Senior Broadcast Producer Mary Murphy, as well as Senior Vice President Betsy West, who had been in charge of all prime time newscasts. Murphy and West resigned on February 25, 2005, and after settling a legal dispute regarding his level of responsibility for the segment, Josh Howard resigned on March 25, 2005.

Dan Rather announced on November 23, 2004, that he would step down in early 2005, and on March 9, his 24th anniversary as anchor, he left the network. It is unclear whether or not Rather's retirement was directly caused by this incident. Les Moonves, CEO of CBS, stated, "Dan Rather has already apologized for the segment and taken responsibility for his part in the broadcast. He voluntarily moved to set a date to step down from the CBS Evening News in March of 2005." He added, "We believe any further action would not be appropriate."

CBS was originally planning to show a 60 Minutes report critical of the Bush administration's justification for going to war in Iraq. This segment was replaced with the Killian documents segment. CBS further postponed airing the Iraq segment until after the election due to the controversy over the Killian documents. "We now believe it would be inappropriate to air the report so close to the presidential election", CBS spokesman Kelli Edwards said in a statement.

After the Killian documents controversy, the show was renamed 60 Minutes Wednesday to differentiate it from the original 60 Minutes Sunday edition, and reverted to its original title on July 8, 2005, when it was moved to the 8 p.m. Friday timeslot. It was cancelled in 2005 due to low ratings.

=== Mapes's and Rather's view of the documents ===
On November 9, 2005, Mary Mapes gave an interview to ABC News correspondent Brian Ross. Mapes stated that the documents have never been proven to be forgeries. Ross expressed the view that the responsibility is on the reporter to verify their authenticity. Mapes responded with, "I don't think that's the standard." This stands in contrast to the statement of the president of CBS News that proof of authenticity is "the only acceptable journalistic standard". Also in November 2005, Mapes told readers of the Washington Post, "I personally believe the documents are not false" and "I was fired for airing a story that could not definitively be proved false but made CBS's public relations department cringe." As of September 2007, Mapes continued to defend the authenticity of the documents: "the far right blogosphere bully boys ... screamed objections that ultimately proved to have no basis in fact."

On November 7, 2006, Rather defended the report in a radio interview and rejected the CBS investigation's findings. In response, CBS spokesman Kevin Tedesco told the Associated Press, "CBS News stands by the report the independent panel issued on this matter, and to this day, no one has been able to authenticate the documents in question."

Dan Rather continued to stand by the story, and in subsequent interviews stated that he believed that the documents had never conclusively been proven to be forgeries – and that even if the documents are false, the underlying story is true.

=== Rather's lawsuit against CBS/Viacom ===
On September 19, 2007, Rather filed a $70 million lawsuit against CBS and its former corporate parent, Viacom, claiming they had made him a "scapegoat" over the controversy caused by the 2004 60 Minutes Wednesday report that featured the Killian documents. The suit named as defendants: CBS and its CEO, Leslie Moonves: Viacom, Sumner Redstone, chairman of both Viacom and CBS Corporation; and Andrew Heyward, the former president of CBS News.

In January 2008, the legal teams for Rather and CBS reached an agreement to produce for Rather's attorneys "virtually all of the materials" related to the case, including the findings of Erik T. Rigler's report to CBS about the documents and the story.

On September 29, 2009, New York State Court of Appeals dismissed Rather's lawsuit and stated that the lower court should have honored CBS's request to throw out the entire lawsuit instead of just throwing out parts.

== Authentication issues ==
No generally recognized document experts have positively authenticated the memos. Since CBS used only faxed and photocopied duplicates, authentication to professional standards is impossible, regardless of the provenance of the originals.

Document experts have challenged the authenticity of the documents as photocopies of valid originals on a variety of grounds, ranging from anachronisms of their typography, their quick reproducibility using modern technology, and errors in their content and style.

The CBS independent panel report did not specifically take up the question of whether the documents were forgeries, but retained a document expert, Peter Tytell, who concluded the documents used by CBS were produced using current word processing technology.

Tytell concluded ... that (i) the relevant portion of the Superscript Exemplar was produced on an Olympia manual typewriter, (ii) the Killian documents were not produced on an Olympia manual typewriter and (iii) the Killian documents were produced on a computer in Times New Roman typestyle [and that] the Killian documents were not produced on a typewriter in the early 1970s and therefore were not authentic.

== Accusations of bias ==
Some critics of CBS and Dan Rather argued that by proceeding with the story when the documents had not been authenticated, CBS was exhibiting media bias and attempting to influence the outcome of the 2004 presidential election. Freelance journalist Michael Smith had emailed Mapes, asking, "What if there was a person who might have some information that could change the momentum of an election, but we needed to get an ASAP book deal to help get us the information?" Mapes replied, "that looks good, hypothetically speaking, of course". The Thornburgh–Boccardi report found that Mapes' contact with Kerry adviser Joe Lockhart was "highly inappropriate", and that it "crossed the line as, at a minimum, it gave the appearance of a political bias and could have been perceived as a news organizations' assisting a campaign as opposed to reporting on a story"; however, the Panel did not "find a basis to accuse those who investigated, produced, vetted or aired the Segment of having a political bias". In a later interview with The Washington Post, when asked about the issue of political bias, review panel member Louis Boccardi said "bias is a hard thing to prove". The panel concluded that the problems occurred "primarily because of a rush to air that overwhelmed the proper application of the CBS News Standards".

Some Democratic critics of Bush suggested that the memos were produced by the Bush campaign to discredit the media's reporting on Bush's National Guard service. The chairman of the Democratic National Committee, Terry McAuliffe, suggested that the memos might have originated with long-time Bush strategist Karl Rove. McAuliffe told reporters on September 10, "I can tell you that nobody at the Democratic National Committee or groups associated with us were involved in any way with these documents", he said. "I'm just saying that I would ask Karl Rove the same question." McAuliffe later pointed out that Rove and another Republican operative, Ralph Reed, had "a known history of dirty tricks", and he asked whether Republican National Committee chairman Ed Gillespie would rule out any involvement by GOP consultant Roger Stone. At a community forum in Utica, New York in 2005, U.S. Representative Maurice Hinchey (D-NY) pointed out that the controversy served Rove's objectives: "Once they did that, then it undermined everything else about Bush's draft dodging. ... That had the effect of taking the whole issue away." After being criticized, Hinchey responded, "I didn't allege I had any facts. I said this is what I believe and take it for what it's worth."

Rove and Stone have denied any involvement. In a 2008 interview in The New Yorker, Stone said "It was nuts to think I had anything to do with those documents ... [t]hose papers were potentially devastating to George Bush. You couldn't put them out there assuming that they would be discredited. You couldn't have assumed that this would rebound to Bush's benefit. I believe in bank shots, but that one was too big a risk."

== See also ==
- George W. Bush military service controversy
- Questioned document examination
- Truth (2015 film)
