= George W. Bush military service controversy =

Controversy surrounding George W. Bush during his 2004 campaign

George Walker Bush
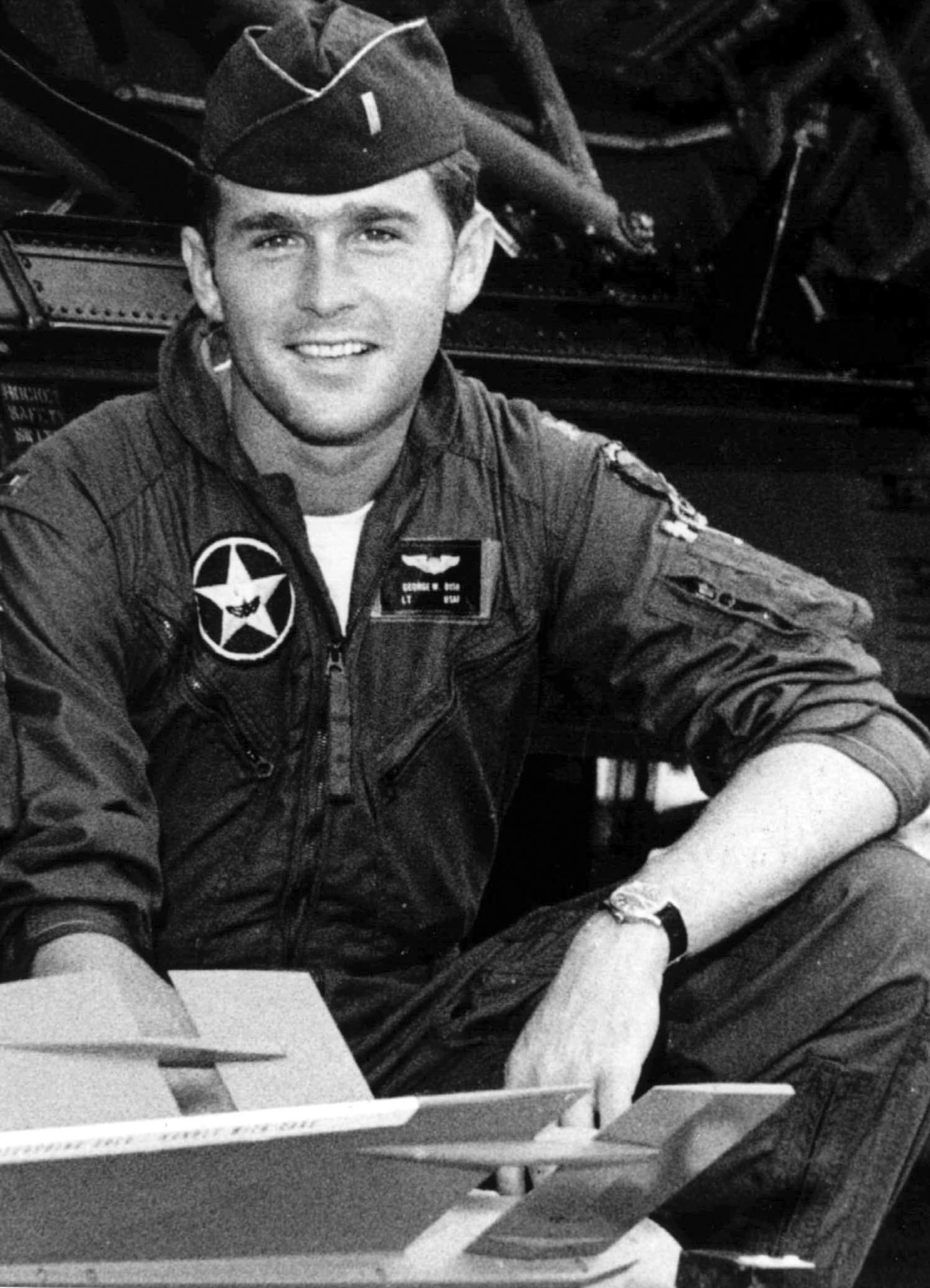
- 1st Lt. George W. Bush in uniform
- Military career
- Branch: United States Air Force (Air National Guard)
- Service years: 1968–1974
- Rank: First Lieutenant
- Units: Texas: 147th Reconnaissance Wing Alabama: 187th Fighter Wing

During George W. Bush's 2004 presidential campaign, controversy arose surrounding his service in the Air National Guard in the late 1960s and early 1970s. The controversy specifically surrounded Bush's service in the Texas Air National Guard, why he lost his flight status, and whether he fulfilled the requirements of his military service contract.

== Timeline ==
George W. Bush joined the 147th Fighter-Interceptor Group of the Texas Air National Guard on May 27, 1968, during the Vietnam War. He committed to serve until May 26, 1974, with two years on active duty while training to fly and four years on part-time duty. In his 1968 Statement of Intent (undated), he wrote, "I have applied for pilot training to make flying a lifetime pursuit, and I believe I can best accomplish this to my satisfaction by serving as a member of the Air National Guard as long as possible."

Bush was quoted as saying elsewhere "I was not prepared to shoot my eardrum out with a shotgun to get a deferment. Nor was I willing to go to Canada". In his autobiography Bush states that he was willing to serve his country but preferred to do so as a combat pilot rather than "An infantryman wading across a paddy-field".

Following his six weeks of basic training, Bush began 54 weeks of flight training at Moody Air Force Base, Georgia. In December 1969, Bush began twenty-one weeks of fighter-interceptor training on the F-102 in Houston at the 147th's Combat Crew Training School, soloing in March 1970 and graduating in June 1970. When he graduated, he had fulfilled his two-year active-duty commitment.

In November 1970, Lt. Col. Jerry B. Killian, commander of the 111th Fighter Squadron, recommended that Bush be promoted to first lieutenant, calling him "a dynamic outstanding young officer" who stood out as "a top-notch fighter interceptor pilot." He said that "Lt. Bush's skills far exceed his contemporaries," and that "he is a natural leader whom his contemporaries look to for leadership. Lt. Bush is also a good follower with outstanding disciplinary traits and an impeccable military bearing." Bush was promoted.

Air National Guard members could volunteer for active duty service with the Air Force in a program called Palace Alert. The program deployed F-102 pilots to Europe and Southeast Asia, including Vietnam and Thailand. Six Air National Guard squadrons were deployed to Korea and Vietnam during 1968. According to three pilots from Bush's squadron, Bush inquired about this program but was advised by the base commander that he did not have the necessary flying experience (500 hours) at the time and that the F-102 would soon be retired, all aircraft of the type withdrawn from Vietnam by the end of 1968.

Bush's four-year part-time obligation to serve required him to maintain his immediate readiness to be recalled to active duty in the event of a national emergency. Bush performed part-time Guard duty as an F-102 pilot through April 1972, logging a total of 336 flight hours.

Before April 1972, Bush had fulfilled more than the required hours of service, but with more than two years remaining before his discharge. He volunteered his services on several projects, including a political campaign. After April 1972, Bush may have failed to meet the attendance requirements established for members of the Air National Guard. In mid-1972, he failed to meet the Air Force requirement for an annual physical examination for pilots and lost his authorization to be a pilot. According to Bush's pay records, he did not attend any drills between mid-April and the end of October 1972. He drilled in Alabama in October and November 1972, and again in January 1973; what duties he performed are unknown. Bush returned to his home unit in Houston and was paid for his service in April 1973 through July 1973; again, what duties he performed are not documented in any way.

On October 1, 1973, Bush was honorably discharged from the Texas Air National Guard and transferred to the Air Force Reserve's inactive reserves in Denver, Colorado. He was discharged from the Air Force Reserve on November 21, 1974, ending his military service.

== Acceptance into the Air National Guard ==
During the 1968–1974 period, Presidents Lyndon B. Johnson and Richard Nixon decided against calling up National Guard units for service in Vietnam. However, military documents show during the Vietnam War, almost 23,000 Army and Air Guardsmen were called up for a year of active duty; some 8,700 were deployed to Vietnam.

In 1999, Ben Barnes, former Democratic Speaker of the Texas House of Representatives and Lieutenant Governor of Texas, gave testimony in a deposition for a lawsuit related to the Texas lottery; and following the deposition, his lawyer issued a statement to the press. According to the statement, Barnes had called the head of the Texas Air National Guard, Brigadier General James Rose, to recommend Bush for a pilot spot at the request of Bush family friend Sidney Adger. The statement also said, "Neither Congressman Bush nor any other member of the Bush family asked Barnes' help. Barnes has no knowledge that Governor Bush or President Bush knew of Barnes' recommendation." While working as an active fundraiser for John Kerry, Bush's opponent during the 2004 U.S. Presidential campaign, Barnes repeated that he used his political influence to preferentially refer people to the National Guard, including Bush.

Both George W. Bush and his father have stated that they did not ask Adger to intercede and were unaware of any action he may have taken. Walter Staudt, the colonel in command of Bush's squadron, has stated that he accepted Bush's application without receiving any outside pressure to do so.

In applying for pilot training, Bush took a standardized test on which he had a low score, in the 25th percentile. Also, Bush had two arrests for college pranks and four traffic offenses before applying for pilot training. In 2004, former and current military pilots said it was uncommon for an applicant to be accepted into pilot's school with such a record, though there was no specific score that disqualified a candidate.

== Flight performance and flight status in 1972 and 1973 ==
=== Final flights ===
Flight logs released in September 2004 in response to a lawsuit (see below) showed that Bush, who had been flying in the F-102A Delta Dagger, a single-seater interceptor, for most of his career, flew nine times in T-33 trainers in February and March 1972 – nearly twice as many times as he had flown in T-33s in the prior 18 months. The logs also show that on March 12 and April 10 of 1972, Bush took two passes to land his F-102 fighter. Although White House officials could not explain the changes in the flight logs in these final flights, Air Force experts said there could be any of a number of reasons for the change in Bush's flight pattern. Retired Major General Paul A. Weaver, a former head of the Air National Guard, said Bush could have just been practicing landing skills. "It doesn't mean anything to have multiple approaches," Weaver said.

The final two entries of Bush's official flight logs show him being assigned to work as an instructional pilot in late May 1972 at a Texas Air National Guard base. The entries were entered even though he had left for Alabama in mid-May (see below) and his pay records show nonpayment for any work on the two dates of the instructional pilot assignment. Coding on the logs showed these assignments were subsequently deleted from the official record.

=== Flight physical ===
By regulation, all Air Force pilots were required to take and pass an annual physical in order to remain in flight status, in the three months prior to a pilot's birthday (in Bush's case, July 6). Bush did not take this mandatory physical examination in mid-1972. As a result of his failure to take his physical, his flight status was suspended by his commander on August 1, 1972, confirmed by Colonel Bobby Hodges on September 5, 1972, and confirmed again by a National Guard Bureau order on September 29, 1972, which meant he no longer was authorized to fly as a pilot.

Air National Guard regulations require that "the local commander who has authority to convene a Flying Evaluation Board will direct an investigation as to why the individual failed to accomplish the medical examination." But there are no records of an investigation or of any requests to complete one.

Although flight surgeons did the previous two physicals that Bush had taken, Bush said in 2000 that he wanted to wait to take the examination until his private doctor could do it. But regulations required the physical to be performed by an Air Force doctor. Air Force flight surgeons were assigned to Maxwell Air Force Base in Montgomery, Alabama, located across town from Maxwell AFB at the Dannelly Field Air National Guard Base at Dannelly Field airport, where Bush was paid for drilling in October and November 1972 and in January 1973, his only drilling dates between April 1972 and April 1973.

According to his released military records, after April 1972 Bush never flew again as an Air National Guard pilot.

== Drill attendance in 1972 and 1973 ==
During 2004, Democratic National Committee chairman Terry McAuliffe and others accused Bush of being absent without leave (AWOL) from the Air National Guard in 1972–73. White House communications director Dan Bartlett and others, who called the charge election-year propaganda, noted that Bush was honorably discharged and that no AWOL charge had ever been made against Bush by the National Guard.

Released military records show that Bush's documented service record through mid-April 1972 (Bush drilled on the 15th and 16th of that month) was without gaps; the period in question is from May 1972 forward.

=== Transfer request ===
On May 24, 1972, Bush submitted a form requesting a transfer to the 9921st Air Reserve Squadron in Montgomery, Alabama, under the command of Lieutenant Colonel Reese R. Bricken. According to the request form, Bush was already in Alabama at work on the Senate campaign of Winton M. Blount, who was a friend of his father. Jimmy Allison, a longtime family friend, helped Bush get the campaign work.

On May 26, Bricken approved Bush's application for transfer. Bricken wrote: "You already understand that this is a Training Category G, Pay Group None, Reserve Section MM proposition." As an obligated Reservist, Bush was in Training Category "fA", which required a minimum of 48 periods of inactive duty training, and 15 days of active duty training, and was required to remain in that Training Category. Training Category "G" offered no training at all. According to Air Force regulations (AFM 35-3, paragraph 14-6), being in "Training Category A" meant that "If a member...will be unable to further train with his unit because of an impending change of residence,...he is required to sign a statement that he has been counseled." That counseling included notifying Bush of his obligation to find a new unit with which he could fulfill his training obligations.

On July 31, the Air Reserve Personnel Center (ARPC) rejected Bush's transfer request, saying that he could not be reassigned to an Air Reserve Squadron because of his obligated service. Bricken, asked about the matter in 2000, said that Bush made no effort to participate as a Guardsman with the 9921st.

=== Equivalent duty in Alabama ===
Bush remained obligated to train with his Texas unit or to perform substitute training elsewhere each month. On September 5, 1972, he requested permission to "perform equivalent duty" at the 187th Tactical Reconnaissance Group in Alabama "for the months of September, October, and November." He did not receive approval to do so, though his commanding officer recommended he be granted permission. He would have reported to Lieutenant Colonel William Turnipseed, the base commander, for drills on October 7 and 8, and November 4 and 5 (the September drill dates of the unit had already passed). Bush's grandfather, former U.S. Senator Prescott Bush, died of cancer on October 8, and Bush served as a pallbearer at the funeral in Greenwich, Connecticut. Turnipseed has said that he could not recall whether Bush reported on those occasions.

In 2004, John "Bill" Calhoun, a former Alabama Air National Guard officer who had served at the Dannelly Field Air National Guard Base said he had seen Bush report for duty "at least six times." He stated this happened in the spring and summer of 1972, a period Bush had not even applied for, and that Bush had spent time in his office. However, the payment and retirement records the White House handed out three days prior to Calhoun's claims show that Bush received no pay or attendance credits during that May to October period.

The U.S. Senate campaign in Alabama, on which Bush worked, ended on November 7, 1972, when Blount lost overwhelmingly. Released military records show that Bush was paid for service for the days of October 28–29 and November 11–14, 1973, and for January 4–6 and 8–10, 1973, and that he received a dental examination at Dannelly on January 6. All of those dates are outside of the period that was claimed for Bush's service in Alabama.

A 2006 column in the Birmingham News (Alabama) reported about people who remembered Bush when he was in Alabama, working for the Blount campaign: "None have specific recollections about Bush and the National Guard. Some heard he was serving but never saw for themselves." Opinions of him during his time working on the campaign ranged from good (amiable, well-liked, and fond of sports) to bad (bragging about drinking and allegations he trashed a cottage where he was living). Winton Blount's son Tom said "He was an attractive person, kind of a 'frat boy.' I didn't like him."

In 1972 and 1973, Bush dated Mavanee Bear, another member of Blount's campaign staff. Bear said in 2009 that "I know [Bush] served" while in Alabama because he had to reschedule meetings regularly, but also said, "I didn't see him in uniform." When later back in Texas, she said she frequently saw him in uniform, stating "I think he was mostly just flying in circles over Houston."

In a document dated May 2, 1973, Bush's immediate superiors gave him his annual performance review for the period from May 1, 1972, to April 30, 1973. The review stated that "Lt. Bush has not been observed at this unit during the period of the report." Lt. Col. William D. Harris Jr. and Lt. Col. Jerry B. Killian also wrote, "A civilian occupation made it necessary for him to move to Montgomery, Ala. He cleared this base on May 15, 1972, and has been performing equivalent training in a non-flying status with the 187 Tac Recon Gp. Dannelly ANG Base, Alabama."

=== Return to Houston ===
Back in Houston, in late 1972 or early 1973, Bush did unpaid volunteer work for a number of months with an inner-city poverty program, Project P.U.L.L. (Professional United Leadership League), the brainchild of John White, a former professional football player and civic leader.

Bush was paid for drilling on April 7–8, 1973. That service presumably occurred at his home base, Ellington Air Force Base, in Houston, in contradiction to the information in his performance review. For May 1973, Bush was paid for service on fifteen days: 1–3, 8–11, 19–20, 22–24, and 29-31. For June, he was paid for five days; for July (his last month of drilling) for 19 days. However, there is nothing in the released military documents that shows that he actually reported for duty on those days, or exactly where, or what duties he performed. As of the end of July 1973, Bush had been in the Air National Guard for a little over five years.

== Six-year service obligation ==
On May 27, 1968, Bush signed a six-year obligation. That required him to complete "48 scheduled inactive-duty training periods" each fiscal year (typically consisting of four four-hour periods during one weekend each month), plus a minimum of 15 days of Annual Active Duty Training. For Bush, as a pilot, this was typically split into periods of duty of a few days each during the year.

The Boston Globe reported in September 2004 that "Bush fell well short of meeting his military obligation." They cite examples of Bush failing to meet Air National Guard commitments in 1972 and 1973. Bush's military records show that he was credited for attending Air National Guard drills during 1972 and 1973, but the time frame of these drills (see above) still left questions.

On July 30, 1973, his last day of paid service in the Texas Air National Guard, Bush signed a statement that "I have been counseled this date regarding my plans to leave my present Reserve of [sic] assignment due to moving from this area. I understand that: a. If I disassociate from my current Ready Reserve Assignment, it is my responsibility to locate and be assigned to another Reserve Forces unit or mobilization augmentation position. If I fail to do so, I am subject to involuntary order to active duty for up to 24 months under the provisions of AFM 35-3, chapter 14."

On September 5, 1973, Bush requested discharge from Texas Air National Guard service, to be effective on October 1. He wrote, "I am moving to Boston, Massachusetts to attend Harvard Business School as a full-time student." Jerry Killian recommended approval of the discharge the following day. Bush had completed five years, four months, and five days toward his six-year service obligation.

On October 1, 1973, Bush was honorably discharged from the Texas Air National Guard and transferred to the Air Force Reserve's inactive reserves in Denver, Colorado. On November 21, 1974, he was discharged from the Air Force Reserve, ending his military service.

In September 2004, after reviewing the payroll records for Bush's last two years of service, Lawrence Korb, an Assistant Secretary of Defense under President Ronald Reagan, concluded that the records indicated that Bush did not fulfill his obligations and could have been ordered to active duty as a result.

== Release of military records ==
During the 2000 presidential campaign, various military records of Bush were made public by the Bush campaign.

On February 13, 2004, during Bush's re-election campaign, more than 700 additional pages of documents on Bush's service were released, including those from the National Personnel Records Center, under the provisions of the Freedom of Information Act. This release was claimed by some to contradict the statement that Bush made on February 8, 2004 to Meet the Press interviewer Tim Russert, that "We did [authorize the release of everything] in 2000, by the way." In response, Bush contended that he was referring only to documents already in his possession, as opposed to the newly released documents from military sources.

On June 22, 2004, The Associated Press sued the U.S. Department of Defense and the U.S. Air Force, seeking access to all of Bush's records during his military service.

On July 8, 2004, the Pentagon reported that the microfilmed payroll records of Bush and numerous other service members had been inadvertently ruined in 1996 and 1997 by the Defense Finance and Accounting Service during a project to salvage deteriorating microfilm. The records lost included those covering July through September 1972, when Bush's claims of service in Alabama were in question, and the Pentagon reported that no paper backups were found.

On July 23, 2004, the Pentagon reported that the records it had previously reported destroyed had been found. A Pentagon official said the earlier statement that the records were destroyed was an "inadvertent oversight." The Pentagon released computerized payroll records covering Bush's 1972 service. Like the records released earlier by the White House, the newly released documents did not indicate that Bush performed any drills, in Alabama or elsewhere, during May through September 1972.

On September 7, 2004, the White House released the flight logs recording the flights done by Bush as a pilot. A Pentagon spokeswoman said the logs were found at the National Personnel Records Center in St. Louis, which is the central repository for veterans' records. She said the logs were found among a batch of records sent to St. Louis from Norton Air Force Base in 1993, which were originally thought to contain records of active-duty officers rather than of National Guardsmen such as Bush.

On September 24, 2004, under court order resulting from an earlier FOIA lawsuit filed by the Associated Press, the Pentagon released more documents.

On September 29, 2004, the White House released a November 1974 document, saying it had been in Bush's personnel file and that the Pentagon had found it.

On October 5, 2004, more than a week after a court-imposed deadline to turn over all records of Bush's military service, the Texas Air National Guard produced two previously unreleased documents (four pages of records) that included Bush's orders for his last day of active duty in 1973.

On October 14, 2004, two weeks after Texas National Guard officials signed an oath swearing they had turned over all records, the Texas National Guard released 31 additional pages of documents found by two retired Army lawyers who went through Guard files under an agreement between the Texas National Guard and The Associated Press, which sued to gain access to the files. A Guard spokesman defended the continuing discoveries, saying Guard officials did not find all of Bush's records because they were disorganized and in poor shape. "These boxes are full of dirt and rat [excrement] and dead bugs. They have never [sic] been sitting in an uncontrolled climate," said Lt. Col. John Stanford. "It's a tough task to go through archives that were not set up in a way that you could easily go through them."

== Memos allegedly from Jerry Killian ==
The "Killian documents" were initially claimed by CBS to have come from the "personal files" of the late Lt. Col. Jerry B. Killian, Bush's squadron commander during Bush's Air National Guard service. They describe preferential treatment during Bush's service, including pressure on Killian to "sugar coat" an annual officer rating report for the then 1st Lt. Bush. CBS aired the story on September 8, 2004 on 60 Minutes II, amid more releases of Bush's official records by the Department of Defense, including one just the day before as the result of a FOIA lawsuit by the Associated Press.

The Killian documents were forgeries, according to The New York Times Starting with a Free Republic web posting by Harry MacDougald, a conservative Republican lawyer posting under the blogger name "Buckhead." MacDougald and multiple fellow bloggers claimed that the formatting shown in the documents used proportional fonts that did not come into common use until desktop word processors became common, long after the purported memos were dated and were therefore forgeries. Experts have concluded that the documents are beyond all reasonable doubt, fakes. For instance, it is unlikely that the typewriters available to Killian's secretary could have produced such a document, and the documents contained U.S. Army, rather than U.S. Air Force, jargon.

The forgery allegations subsequently came to the attention of the mainstream media, especially after experts also questioned the documents' authenticity and lack of a chain of custody. The original documents have never been submitted for authentication. The man who delivered the copies, Lt. Col. Bill Burkett, a former officer in the Texas Army National Guard and outspoken Bush critic, claimed that he burned the originals. Burkett admitted lying to CBS and USA Today about where he had obtained the papers and eventually expressed doubts of his own about their authenticity.

CBS and Dan Rather initially defended the documents and the report, but on September 20, 2004 – less than two months before Election Day, CBS News stated that it had been "misled" and that it could not authenticate the documents and should not have used them. A later 60 Minutes broadcast an interview with Marian Carr Knox, secretary to Killian at the time, who stated that she "didn't type these memos", although she stated she had typed memos of similar content. CBS then formed an independent panel headed by former U.S. Attorney General Dick Thornburgh and retired Associated Press president Louis D. Boccardi to investigate the story and the handling of the Killian memos. The final report of the panel, while not addressing the authenticity of the documents, faulted many of the decisions made in developing the story, and producer Mary Mapes along with three others were forced to resign from CBS News.

Prior to the panel report being completed, Rather announced the date of his retirement, left 60 Minutes II, stepped down as anchor on March 9, 2006, and then left CBS altogether on June 20, 2006. The CBS news show that had aired the memos, 60 Minutes II, was canceled on May 18, 2005, allegedly due to poor ratings and not because of the memos broadcast.

In September 2007, Rather sued CBS and its former parent company, Viacom, for US$70 million, claiming that he had been made a "scapegoat" over the memos story. His legal fight with CBS ended in January 2010 when the New York State Supreme Court declined to hear his motion to reinstate his lawsuit.
