= Los Angeles Times (disambiguation) =

The Los Angeles Times is the largest newspaper in Los Angeles.

Los Angeles Times may also refer to:

- Los Angeles Times Magazine (also shortened to LA), a monthly supplement magazine of the Los Angeles Times newspaper
- Los Angeles Times Building, part of Times Mirror Square

== See also ==
- Los Angeles Times Syndicate, a print syndication service that operated from c, 1949 to 2000
- Los Angeles Times 500, an annual NASCAR Winston Cup race held at Ontario Motor Speedway during the 1970s
- Los Angeles Times Grand Prix, a sports car race held at the Riverside International Raceway from 1957 until 1987
- Los Angeles Times Book Prize, a set of annual book prizes by the newspaper
- Los Angeles Times Festival of Books, founded in 1996
- Los Angeles Times v. Free Republic, a United States district court copyright law case
- Los Angeles Times–Washington Post News Service, a joint news agency between the Los Angeles Times and The Washington Post from 1962 to 2009
