= Truth (2015 film) =

2015 film by James Vanderbilt

- Theatrical release poster
- Directed by: James Vanderbilt
- Screenplay by: James Vanderbilt
- Based on: Truth and Duty by Mary Mapes
- Produced by: Bradley J. Fischer; Doug Mankoff; Brett Ratner; William Sherak; Andy Spaulding; James Vanderbilt
- Starring: Cate Blanchett; Robert Redford; Topher Grace; Elisabeth Moss; Bruce Greenwood; Stacy Keach; Dennis Quaid
- Cinematography: Mandy Walker
- Edited by: Richard Francis-Bruce
- Music by: Brian Tyler
- Production companies: Echo Lake Entertainment; Mythology Entertainment; RatPac-Dune Entertainment; Dirty Films
- Distributed by: Sony Pictures Classics
- Release dates: September 12, 2015 (TIFF); October 16, 2015 (United States)
- Running time: 125 minutes
- Country: United States
- Language: English
- Budget: $9.6 million
- Box office: $6.8 million

Truth is a 2015 American political drama film written, directed, and produced by James Vanderbilt in his directorial debut. Based on Mary Mapes's memoir, Truth and Duty, it dramatizes the Killian documents controversy and the resulting last days of news anchor Dan Rather (Robert Redford) and producer Mary Mapes (Cate Blanchett) at CBS News.

Truth had its world premiere at the 2015 Toronto International Film Festival. The film received a limited release in the United States on October 16, 2015, before being released nationwide on October 30, 2015, by Sony Pictures Classics.

== Plot ==
Months before the 2004 US presidential election, Mary Mapes (producer of 60 Minutes Wednesday) and her crew consisting of Mike Smith, Lucy Scott, and Colonel Roger Charles are seeking evidence to verify whether or not George W. Bush received any preferential treatment during his time in the military. Charles, knowing that the military "is good at what they do", believes there were no mistakes or errors, despite some claims that Bush's records were lost or altered, and that Bush had difficulty meeting minimal physical aptitude testing. Seeking leads, Mapes and her crew eventually find Bill Burkett, who says he has documents in the form of memos and letters dictating that Bush did indeed have preferential treatment and went AWOL for one year in 1972. Rather also interviews former Texan Lieutenant Governor Ben Barnes who admits he pulled strings which enabled George Bush to join the National Guard. Mapes produces a story that Dan Rather reports on 60 Minutes.

After the airing, Mapes and Rather face questions over the accuracy of the segment. The authenticity of the documents on which the allegations are based is called into question. A controversy is fueled by radio hosts and bloggers and amplified by mainstream media sources, The Washington Post, and by CBS itself. Certain characteristics of the memos, such as their font and letter spacing, indicate they were created on a computer using Microsoft Word, and therefore could not have been typed on a typewriter in the early 1970s. Subsequently, Burkett, who presented the documents, admits that he lied about where he obtained them.

Jerry Killian was George W. Bush's commanding officer in 1972. At the time of the CBS reporting in 2004, Killian was dead. Killian's supervisory officer Robert "Bobby" Hodges recants an earlier statement that the Killian documents were authentic. However, Hodges refuses to dwell on whether or not there is "truth" in the documents.

Dan Rather is forced to apologize for presenting the material as fact. After the scandal, Mapes, her crew, and Rather are faced with charges that Mapes's liberal political agenda played a part in airing the segment. One by one they are forced to face an internal review panel to determine if political bias was a factor. The internal investigation focus on the authenticity of the Killian documents as opposed to their content. Smith, Scott and Charles are eventually banned from their work and fired, with Smith going on a rant in the office before being escorted out. Rather decides that after the hearing he will retire from broadcasting. After two sessions facing the board, Mapes lectures her opponents:

Our story was about whether Bush fulfilled his service. But nobody wants to talk about that. They want to talk about fonts and forgeries and conspiracy theories, because that's what people do these days if they don't like a story. They point and scream, they question your politics, your objectivity – hell, your basic humanity – and they hope to God the truth gets lost in the scrum. And when it is finally over and they have kicked and shouted so loud, we can't even remember what the point was.

Nonetheless, she is fired after the hearing. Rather makes his last broadcast, citing the courage it took for his crew to get through the toughest times.

Titles at the end of the film note that Mary Mapes was fired and four executives were asked to resign, and also that CBS won a Peabody Award for Mapes' earlier documentary exposing atrocities at Abu Ghraib.

== Cast ==
- Cate Blanchett as Mary Mapes
- Robert Redford as Dan Rather
- Topher Grace as Mike Smith
- Dennis Quaid as Colonel Roger Charles
- Elisabeth Moss as Lucy Scott
- Bruce Greenwood as Andrew Heyward
- David Lyons as Josh Howard
- John Benjamin Hickey as Mark Wrolstad
- Stacy Keach as Bill Burkett
- Noni Hazlehurst as Nicki Burkett
- Dermot Mulroney as Lawrence Lanpher
- Rachael Blake as Betsy West
- Andrew McFarlane as Dick Hibey
- William Devane as the voice of General Robert 'Bobby' Hodges on the telephone
- Philip Quast as Ben Barnes
- Connor Burke as Robert Mapes
- Nicholas Hope as Marcel Matley

== Production ==
The film is based on Mary Mapes's 2005 memoir Truth and Duty: The Press, the President, and the Privilege of Power. It was produced by Mythology Entertainment. The film had been in development since 2007.

In July 2014, it was announced that Robert Redford and Cate Blanchett would portray CBS News anchor Dan Rather and 60 Minutes Wednesday producer Mary Mapes, respectively. In September 2014, Elisabeth Moss joined the cast as CBS associate producer Lucy Scott, and Dennis Quaid was cast as Colonel Roger Charles. Topher Grace and John Benjamin Hickey joined the film in October, as researcher Mike Smith, and Mark Wrolstad, Mapes's husband, respectively. Bruce Greenwood was cast as Andrew Heyward, president of CBS News. In November, David Lyons was added to the cast as Josh Howard, 60 Minutes executive producer and Mapes's supervisor. It was later reported that Stacy Keach had joined the cast of the film. Mandy Walker is the cinematographer, and Fiona Crombie is production designer. Brian Tyler scored the film.

=== Filming ===
The film's production budget was more than $9.6 million. Principal photography began in October 2014 in Sydney, with filming scheduled for eight weeks during the Australian spring.

== Release ==
Charles Johnson's animated GIF image comparing a memo purportedly typewritten in 1973 with a proportional-spaced document made in Microsoft Word with default settings in 2004

On May 18, 2015, it was announced that Sony Pictures Classics had acquired US distribution rights for $6 million. The film was selected to be screened in the Special Presentations section of the 2015 Toronto International Film Festival in September 2015, and was selected as the Opening Night film of the 23rd Hamptons International Film Festival. It premiered in the UK at the BFI London Film Festival. The film was released in the United States on October 16, 2015, with a limited opening in 6 theaters, making $66,232. It expanded wider on October 30 to 1,122 theaters, making $875,935, for a total of $1.1 million. Variety described this a "dispiriting" opening. The Hollywood Reporter said that the film had disappointing opening numbers, as, like other adult dramas and awards hopefuls released in October, it suffered from a "total market saturation by films aimed at the over-30 crowd". As of January 15, 2016, the film's domestic total is $2.54 million.

The film was described as a "bomb" at the box office, after failing to garner expected revenue.

== Reception ==
=== Critical response ===
Truth was well received at the Toronto International Film Festival, where The Hollywood Reporter named it the best film at the festival. On the review aggregator website Rotten Tomatoes, Truth has a 63% approval rating based on reviews from 182 critics, with an average rating of 6.2/10. The website's critical consensus states: "Truth's terrific cast and compelling message are often enough to overcome its occasionally didactic and facile dramatization of a nuanced real-life tale." On Metacritic, the film has received a weighted average score of 66 out of 100 based on 35 critics, indicating "generally favorable reviews". Brian Tallerico of RogerEbert.com praised Blanchett and Redford's performances, but said the characters act as mouthpieces for Vanderbilt's political views.

=== Response from Dan Rather ===
Dan Rather praised Truth, noting that, "there's so much right in the film ... I think it's the best thing that's ever been up on the big screen about how television news really works, the reporting side of it: the telephone calls, wearing out the shoe leather going to see people, developing sources." He also commended Redford's portrayal of him as Redford "did not, which I appreciated very much, try to imitate. He tried to get some essence of me as a person and as a professional."

=== Response from CBS ===
In September 2015, a source close to the film said CBS president and CEO Leslie Moonves did not approve of the film, but did not ask producers for major changes. A source at CBS said it was not planning on publicly condemning the film. In October, Gil Schwartz, the chief spokesman for CBS, who is depicted in the film, said "It's astounding how little truth there is in Truth. There are, in fact, too many distortions, evasions and baseless conspiracy theories to enumerate them all. The film tries to turn gross errors of journalism and judgment into acts of heroism and martyrdom." Andrew Heyward, president of CBS News at the time of the incidents and depicted in the film, said he had not seen the film, but knew its story and was outraged at its portrayals, adding that "only Hollywood could come up with that." CBS refused to advertise the film because of the movie's "inaccuracies and distortions" which would offend CBS News employees. Some at CBS News are "angered" with the film's implication that news executives were pressured to revoke the story by corporate owner Viacom, which "had business reasons to maintain friendly relations with the Bush administration."

In a statement, the film's producers stated, "Although we understand CBS wants to put this episode behind them, it's disappointing that they seem to be so concerned about our film ... The events depicted in Truth are still vigorously debated, and that's a good thing". Brad Fischer, one of the producers, said that a negative response from CBS was not unexpected, but what was surprising is the "tone and the emotional nature" of the response. He said that the filmmakers were "attracted by the intersection of news, politics and business and the story's status as one of the first to be undone by an Internet outcry" and that he hopes people "talk about the issues and ask the questions themselves...I don't think it's our job as filmmakers to draw a conclusion, but rather to pose the questions."
