= Truth and Duty =

Truth and Duty: The Press, the President, and the Privilege of Power
- Cover of the 2005 St. Martin's Press edition
- Author: Mary Mapes
- Language: English
- Publication date: 2005

Truth and Duty: The Press, the President, and the Privilege of Power is a 2005 non-fiction book by Mary Mapes, published by St. Martin's Press.

It is her account of her time at CBS News during the Iraq War and a series of events which resulted in her losing her job. She had covered the Abu Ghraib scandal. She also had produced a program on President of the United States George W. Bush's record in military service, but it was revealed that the program relied on forged documents in what is known as the Killian documents controversy.

James Vanderbilt received a copy of the work with a personal message from Mapes. His film, Truth (2015), is based on the memoir.

== Reception ==
Jonathan Alter in The New York Times described the book as "high-spirited, if overwrought and self-serving".

Dave Denison of the Texas Observer wrote that the book appears like it is "conducting a kind of public therapy" to deal with Mapes' feelings, and then in the final 33% it becomes "a surprisingly compelling brief." Denison stated that people who are involved in politics and journalism covering politics will find the book useful.
