= Free Republic =

Internet forum for conservatives

FreeRepublic
- Website type: Forum
- Available in: English
- Owner: Estate of Jim Robinson
- Creators: Jim Robinson, John Robinson
- Revenue: Donations (not deductible)
- Website: www.freerepublic.com
- Commercial: Yes
- Registration: Required to post
- Launched: February 1997; 29 years ago
- Current status: Active

Free Republic is a moderated Internet forum and chat site for self-described conservatives, primarily within the United States. It presents articles and comments posted pseudonymously by registered members, known as "Freepers", using screen names. The site is supported entirely by donations, with pledge drives known as "Freepathons" held each quarter.

Free Republic has been involved in several organized conservative campaigns including against CBS anchor Dan Rather after Rather reported on documents about President George W. Bush's service record which turned out to be forgeries, and against the Dixie Chicks for their antiwar statements. Freepers were instrumental in raising the question of a lack of authenticity in the so-called "Killian memos".

== Local chapters and forum policies ==
There are local chapters "unconnected with Free Republic", organized through ping lists, e-mail, and Free Republic mail. Some are only "ping list" groups, members who include their names in a list to be "pinged" on news articles of a certain nature. Some cover presidential events (daily picture, prayer, and speech threads), some focus on contemporary conservative issues such as the Second Amendment, the anti-abortion movement, or opposing gay marriage. The more active chapters organize live protests, which they call "Freeps." Since the 2000 election, these are often counter-protests, responses to protests by opposition groups, or small rallies.

As concerns policies and purpose, the main page of Free Republic states,

"Opinions expressed on Free Republic are those of the individual posters and do not necessarily reflect the opinions of Free Republic or its operators. Please enjoy our forum, but also please remember to use common courtesy when posting and refrain from posting personal attacks, profanity, vulgarity, threats, racial or religious bigotry, or any other materials offensive or otherwise inappropriate for a conservative family audience."

"Free Republic does not advocate or condone racism, violence, rebellion, secession, or an overthrow of the government. Free Republic advocates a return to constitutionally limited government, reserving all government powers not expressly delegated by the constitution to the United States to the States respectively, or the people, emphasizing sovereign state governments, local government, self-government and self-rule, while restricting government powers to only those enumerated in the constitution and maximizing individual rights and liberty as originally envisioned and established by our Founding Fathers and secured and defended by the blood of patriots and statesmen for over two hundred years."

== Site funding ==
The FreeRepublic.com website is funded through individual contributions each quarter through fundraising on the website. The website generates approximately $250,000 each year by its own admission.

== History ==
=== 1996–2000: Clinton Administration ===
Founded in September 1996 as a sole proprietorship by Founder, Chairman and President James C. "Jim" Robinson of Fresno, California, Free Republic opened to the general public in February 1997. Robinson filed for LLC status on September 11, 1998. It has always been a for-profit company and thus donations have never been tax exempt.

Free Republic gained popularity during the Clinton impeachment from 1997 till 1999, a time when it was linked on the Drudge Report as "Whitewater Archives," when protests and write-in campaigns were organized through the website. Many were also introduced to the site through an impeachment rally in Washington, attended by over 3000 participants, called the "March for Justice," broadcast live on Halloween 1998 by C-SPAN. Featured speakers included Alan Keyes, Bob Barr, Reverend Jesse Lee Peterson of B.O.N.D. and Larry Klayman; Ann Coulter, Lucianne Goldberg and Matt Drudge also attended. Other Free Republic events over the years have also been televised by C-SPAN.

Drudge dropped the link to Free Republic by February 1999, "because they were doing racist stuff over the [Clinton love child]... I click on and I see this headline, 'Nigger Baby.'" Drudge quickly restored the link, but later dropped it again for unknown reasons. As of April 2008 the Free Republic link is back on Drudge.

In its early years, Free Republic generally allowed its members to post copyrighted news stories in entirety to its forum, regardless of whether permission had been granted by content owners, until the site was sued in 1998 by The Washington Post and The Los Angeles Times for copyright infringement. The newspapers obtained a permanent injunction, although stipulated damages of $1 million were reduced to $10,000 during settlement negotiations which allowed the defendants to drop their appeal. The case, often cited when arguing cyberlaw, is called L.A. Times v. Free Republic.

From 1996 to 2000, the bulletin board was virtually unmoderated. This policy was central to the website's "fair use" defense in the copyright infringement litigation, wherein it stated "(t)he website operated by the defendants, www.freerepublic.com, permits anyone who wishes to post news articles or other items and to post commentary about the article as well ... no censorship is made and all views are permitted.". This supposed light moderating hand did not prevent the permanent banishment from the site of such "controversial" contributors as crime author Dan E. Moldea, novelist Todd Brendan Fahey, "What Really Happened" website host Mike Rivero, and Internet poet David Martin. Salon.com's Jeff Stein observed in 1999 that: "[A] swelling number of haters have turned up the volume of death threats, gay-bashing, name-calling and conspiracy theories tying the father of Republican front-runner George W. Bush to drug-dealing by the CIA." Robinson "famously blasted George W. Bush's presidential candidacy back in 2000, before a dramatic late-campaign about-face that saw him emerge as one of the GOP ticket's biggest supporters." These shifts signalled internal battles comparable to the nomination controversies of 2007 "as its founder and chief administrator first cleansed commenting ranks of Bush supporters, then, later, rallied to his support."

White House Press Secretary and former Fox News commentator Tony Snow was a registered member of Free Republic. Snow was not afraid to 'mix it up' with the Freepers who sometimes disagreed with his political philosophy and who called him a "pansy".

Free Republic had been criticized during the pre-moderation period for the actions of several of its members. In 1999, FReepers ran a campaign to make fake donations to the legal defense fund of Julie Hiatt Steele, who had been charged with obstruction of justice during then-President Bill Clinton's impeachment trial. Hundreds of fraudulent transactions from this campaign cost Ms. Steele around $4000. Some threatened to assassinate Clinton, like this from February 2001: "If he keeps on he's going to make me come up there. There is only one solution to the Klintons, two 45 rounds and a nice little spot in Marcy Park."

When the bar manager of an Austin, Texas restaurant called 9-1-1 to notify authorities that an underage Jenna Bush had attempted to purchase liquor in June 2001, the bar manager's personal information including her home address, date of birth, driver's license number and physical description was posted on FreeRepublic, along with calls for punitive action. The Clinton threat and some of the bar manager's personal information were removed by Robinson when brought to his attention, and the authors' posting privileges were revoked. He said that the site had had to "delete relatively few posts" over time for violations of its "no-violence" policy despite Free Republic's popularity and ease of registration.

=== 2001–2004: Bush's first term and Killian documents ===
In January 2001, the forum organized the inaugural "Free Republic Gala and Count the Silverware Ball". It was attended by radio personality James Golden, who was one of the first high-profile conservatives to invest in the site and the Reverend Jesse Lee Peterson of B.O.N.D.

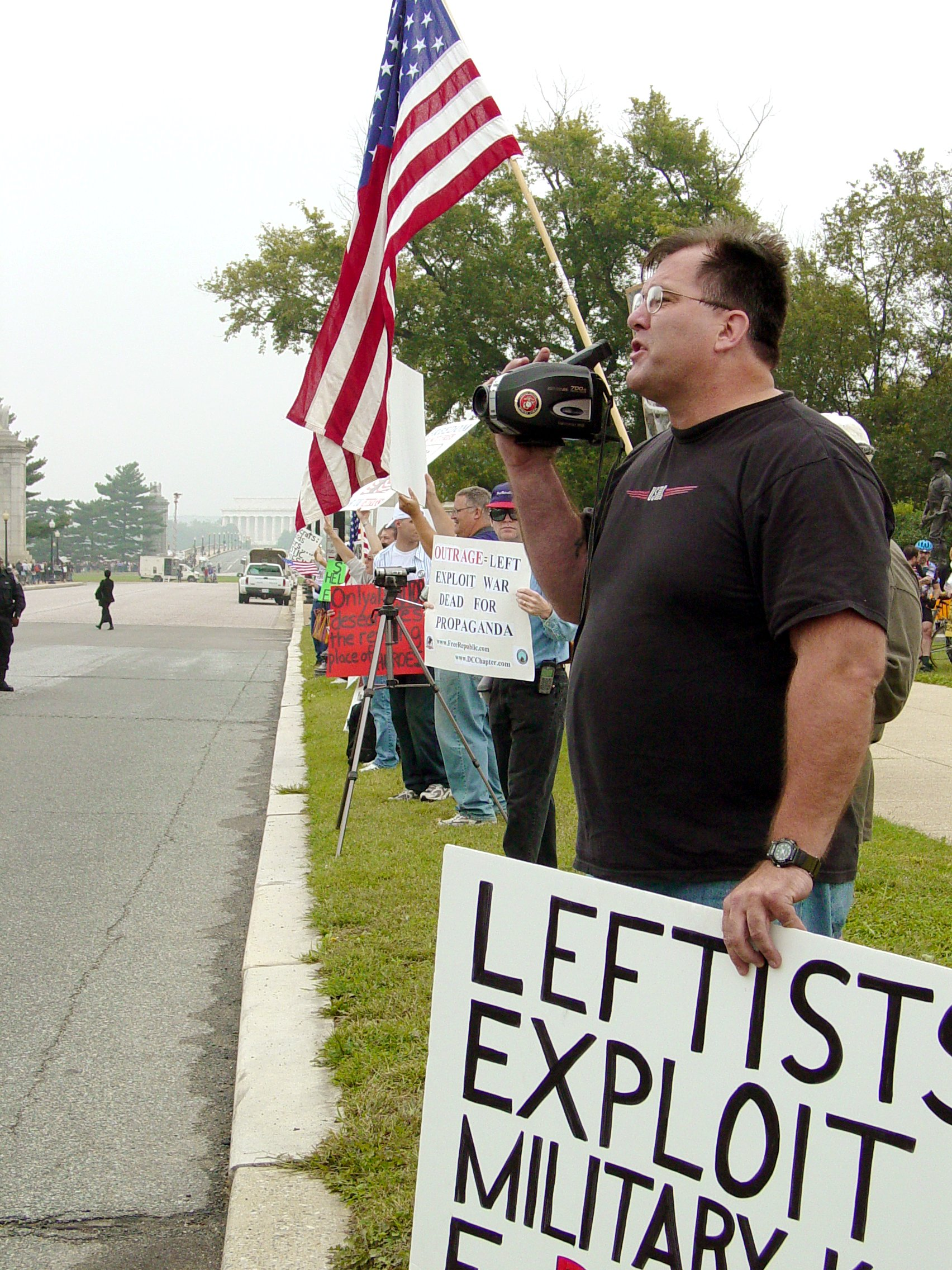
Members of the independent D.C. Chapter counter-protest at an anti-war demonstration at Arlington National Cemetery on October 2, 2004.

During the 2004 election, Jerome Corsi, a Swift Boat Vet and co-author of the book Unfit for Command that attacked the Vietnam War record of Democratic presidential candidate John Kerry, apologized in the national media for comments that he made on Free Republic under the user name "jrlc."

One of the first responses to "Memogate", the controversy surrounding CBS News' use of documents of questionable origin during the 2004 presidential campaign, came on Free Republic the night of the broadcast. When the "Killian memos" (which were allegedly created during the 1970s) were shown during a CBS News broadcast, a Republican lawyer going by the pseudonym of "Buckhead" mentioned the memos' proportional spacing and made the claim that such printing was "not widespread until the mid to late 90s". Buckhead's post and some responses spread across the blogosphere rapidly, and were picked up by the Drudge Report the following afternoon. Within minutes of Buckhead's post, there was some dispute as to whether the Executive line of IBM typewriters had proportionally spaced fonts at the time, arising from a comment on the Power Line blog. The dispute made headlines when an investigative panel set up to examine authenticity issues with the documents "was not able to reach a definitive conclusion". Canadian journalist Ivor Tossell later opined that Free Republic was "central to the network of websites that uncovered the forged memos about Bush's Vietnam service that appeared on CBS News and ultimately cost Dan Rather his job."

==== MD4Bush Incident ====
In October 2004, the "MD4Bush" account was created to investigate the source of false rumors that Democratic Mayor of Baltimore Martin O'Malley had committed adultery. These rumors were suspected to be coming from the camp of Governor of Maryland Robert Ehrlich. O'Malley was a likely (and eventual) opponent of Ehrlich in the 2006 gubernatorial race. Using this alias, MD4Bush allegedly lured Joseph Steffen, aide to Ehrlich, who had a Free Republic membership as "NCPAC," into contact. MD4Bush then allegedly brought up the O'Malley rumors, and baited Steffen into giving responses on the Free Republic "private message" system, appearing to take credit for spreading the rumors.

Ehrlich fired Steffen when the contents of these messages were published in The Washington Post on February 9, 2005. "Kristinn Taylor, a spokesman for FreeRepublic.com, said [Maryland Democratic Party communications director] Ryan O'Doherty's Democratic Party address was one of at least three used to operate the identity of MD4BUSH." Taylor charged that Post reporter Matthew Mosk's access to the MD4Bush account was a violation of the Free Republic users agreement, and they were "looking into whether the Washington Post violated the Electronic Communications Privacy Act when Post reporter Matthew Mosk accessed the Free Republic account of MD4Bush." The e-mail address used in October 2004 to open the MD4Bush account was later changed to rodoherty@mddems.org, then changed for a third time. Anyone who had the password to the MD4Bush account could change the e-mail registration address at any time. It is not known how many people may have had access to that password. The e-mail address information obtained does not shed light on the actual users of the MD4Bush account, nor does it reveal whether someone attached the Ryan O'Doherty e-mail address to the account without his knowledge.

=== 2005–2009: Bush's second term ===
In January 2005, Free Republic organized an unofficial Inaugural Ball at the Washington Plaza Hotel to celebrate the reelection of President Bush and Vice President Dick Cheney and to honor the men and women serving in the United States Armed Forces. The event was promoted to feature then Arkansas Republican Governor Mike Huckabee and his rock band Capitol Offense.

==== Dixie Chicks boycott ====
It's scary how much power they do have. They can take down someone single-handedly and I don't think Americans are aware of that." — Natalie Maines of the Dixie Chicks, speaking about Free Republic.

The band Dixie Chicks and lead singer Natalie Maines claim that Free Republic was instrumental in fueling a nationwide boycott of their music, which was organized by some former fans and radio stations after Maines made anti-Bush comments in 2003. In their 2006 documentary Shut Up and Sing as well as in interviews, the Dixie Chicks have often mentioned Free Republic in reference to the boycott, which sharply reduced sales of their CDs and concert tickets.

Jim Robinson, waving a U.S. flag at right, musters about two dozen other Freepers for the March for Justice II rally at the Upper Senate Park on the United States Capitol grounds on Thursday, April 7, 2005.

Maines was quoted as saying: "It's scary how much power they do have. They can take down someone single-handedly and I don't think Americans are aware of that." "And I think it was originally started by the Free Republic. And they were very organized in calling radio stations across the country and telling them that they would never listen to their station, when they didn't even live in that town." Kristinn Taylor of Free Republic's dominant Washington, D.C. chapter attended the screening of the documentary, hosted by the liberal advocacy group Center for American Progress. He was invited to join in a discussion after the screening and complimented the director on the film.

==== Allegations of unfair treatment of Giuliani supporters and others who digress from popular opinions ====
In 2007, moderators removed the posting privileges of many members who supported the presidential campaign of then current Republican front-runner Rudy Giuliani. The New York Observer reported:

Starting in April 2007 ... members sympathetic to the former mayor's candidacy claim to have suffered banishment from the site. They were victimized, they say, by a wave of purges designed to weed out any remaining support for the Giuliani campaign...

Robinson himself endorsed Fred Thompson and was an enthusiastic backer of his campaign. Robinson has frequently banned fellow conservatives and others who don't completely share his political mindset. Among those claiming to have been permanently banned are several participants in the debate over the violent death of Bill Clinton's Deputy White House Counsel, Vince Foster. They include Hugh Turley of FBICover-up.com, David Martin of DCDave.com, and Dan E. Moldea of Moldea.com. During and after the 2008 U.S. Presidential election, according to political commentator Sean Hannity, "[E]veryone I knew basically left because of so much childish, immature personal attacks. The propensity there to eat their own. And a lot of the people—most of the people—I knew that were on it left."

==== Instigating Birther rumors about Barack Obama ====
On March 1, 2008, a Free Republic poster made the earliest recorded report on the internet of a rumor that then-candidate Barack Obama was secretly born outside the United States, and was falsely claiming to have been born in Hawaii. The poster may have been inspired by a legal hypothetical expressing a similar fact pattern posted at the law blog The Volokh Conspiracy the previous day. The Free Republic poster's claim was then promulgated across other blogs in the months that followed, eventually developing into the birther movement.

=== 2009: Obama administration ===
James von Brunn, the white supremacist who killed a security guard at the Holocaust Museum in Washington, D.C., on June 10, 2009, posted an article on another site questioning the citizenship of President Barack Obama (a view held by so-called "birthers"); the article was then pasted into a thread on Free Republic. The thread was deleted by moderators after the shooting, but later restored when a review found that it had not violated posting guidelines.

In July 2009, after Obama's eleven-year-old daughter Malia was photographed wearing a T-shirt with the peace symbol, a Free Republic thread featured racially charged comments about Obama's wife and children, using such terms as "ghetto street trash". After the thread was criticized, it was eventually suppressed and placed under review. It was then restored to the site intact. Only after persistent criticism did site administrators remove it a second time. In an email response to the incident, Jim Robinson called Obama an "American-hating Marxist pig."

In April 2012, after Rick Santorum's suspension of his presidential campaign left Mitt Romney the presumptive Republican nominee, Robinson posted: "FR will never support the abortionist, homosexualist, socialist, mandate loving, constitution trampling liar Mitt Romney," and indeed, initially, Robinson, the Free Republic site, and many 'Freepers' did not embrace the candidacy of presumptive Republican nominee Mitt Romney. Robinson posted to the site, "I'd rather shut the place down than be involved in any effort to install abortionist/gay rights pushing RINOS like Romney or Giuliani into the White House!! Do NOT push this crap on FR. Take your business elsewhere!!"

Founder Jim Robinson died October 27, 2025.

== Influencing online polls ==
Media web sites, including newspapers, television networks, and America Online, run occasional "polls" that do not use the sampling methods of formal opinion polls, but instead invite all Internet users to respond. Some Free Republic forum messages, usually captioned "Freep this poll!", urge Free Republic members to vote en masse in these polls, to deliberately skew results and render the polls useless. Members are also urged to "'Freep' C-Span's 'Washington Journal' with telephone calls pointing out media bias."

"Whenever a poll is posted on Free Republic.com, everybody goes and votes the right way, and there's nothing wrong with that," says Marinelle Thompson, Freeper and founder of gun rights group Second Amendment Sisters. "We just do it for a laugh. It doesn't really mean anything." The polls can also be manipulated, said Vlae Kershner, SF Gate News Director (and poll writer): "People are finding a way of getting around our system that only allows one vote, and they're voting hundreds of times. It's not thousands of people voting one way; it's one or two people voting hundreds of times."
