= Power Line =

American political blog

- Website type: Conservative blog and news aggregator
- Available in: English
- Founded: May 27, 2002
- Creators: John H. Hinderaker, Scott W. Johnson, and Paul Mirengoff
- Website: www.powerlineblog.com
- Launched: 2002
- Current status: Active

Power Line is an American conservative or right-leaning political blog, founded in May 2002. Its posts were originally written by three lawyers who attended Dartmouth College together, namely John H. Hinderaker, Scott W. Johnson, and Paul Mirengoff. Contributors initially wrote under pen names; John Hinderaker, for example, wrote as "Hindrocket." The site is published by Joseph Malchow, also a Dartmouth graduate.

The site gained recognition for its role in covering the Killian documents story that aired during the 2004 Presidential campaign about forged documents relating to President George W. Bush's term of service in the Texas Air National Guard.

== History ==
Scott Johnson and John Hinderaker had been actively publishing op-eds, magazine articles and research articles for about a decade. On the weekend of Memorial Day, 2002, Hinderaker invited Johnson to start publishing on the Power Line site he had recently created. Johnson credited Hugh Hewitt's radio broadcasts as being the "first big break and recognition" the site received.

In 2004, Power Line was named Time magazine's first-ever "Blog of the Year". When AOL added blogs to their news website in 2007, Power Line was one of the five blogs included. A 2007 memo from the National Republican Senatorial Committee described Power Line as one of the five best-read national conservative blogs. That same year, Forbes recognised Hinderaker as the #19th "biggest and brightest star on the web" on the strength of Powerline's work on Rathergate.

In 2009, CBS News described Powerline as "a prominent conservative blog." In 2014, CBS News reported the site had half a million readers and eight million page views.

== Contributors ==
The main contributors to Power Line are John H. Hinderaker, Scott W. Johnson, Steven F. Hayward, and Lloyd Billingsley. Susan Vass, writing under the name "Ammo Grrrll", contributes a humor column to the site every Friday.

== Rathergate ==
Power Line gained widespread recognition during the 2004 Killian documents controversy relating to a CBS report on George W. Bush's service in the Texas Air National Guard, starting with a post entitled "The Sixty-First Minute"; Powerline is credited with helping break the story. Conservatives (including Power Line, National Review Online and Little Green Footballs) referred to the controversy as "Rathergate". The blogs and their readers questioned the authenticity of the documents, presenting hints of supposed forgery. After noting that the alleged documents used a proportional font, Power Line helped advance the story, triggering coverage by mainstream media outlets. Dan Rather apologized and resigned from the CBS anchor chair.

== See also ==
- Alternative media (U.S. political right)
