= Vicki Mabrey =

American new correspondent

- Born: April 3, 1956 (age 70); St. Louis, Missouri, U.S.
- Education: Howard University
- Occupations: Journalist, correspondent
- Awards: 4 Emmy Awards

Vicki Mabrey (born April 3, 1956) is an American correspondent for ABC News Nightline.

== Career ==
Mabrey was a CBS News 60 Minutes II correspondent from 1999 to 2005. Previously, she worked as a reporter for WBAL-TV in Baltimore, Maryland, for eight years.

Mabrey has received four Emmy Awards: two in 1997 for her reporting on the death of Princess Diana, and two in 1996 for her coverage of the Atlanta Olympic bombing and the crash of TWA Flight 800.

== Personal life and education ==
Mabrey was born in Missouri, which was still segregated at the time, and was one of the first African-American students at her grade school. She earned a degree in political science from Howard University, in Washington, D.C. She is Catholic.
