= Capitol Offense (band) =

American rock cover band

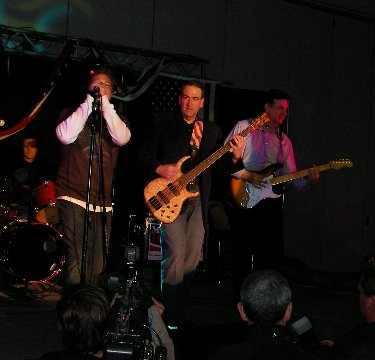
- Republican presidential candidate Mike Huckabee (center) performs with his band "Capitol Offense" at the Republican Party of Iowa's Lincoln Day Dinner on April 14, 2007.

Background information
- Origin: Little Rock, Arkansas, U.S.
- Genres: Rock, rock and roll
- Years active: 1996–present
- Members: Mike Huckabee; Aaron Black; Steve Pyle; Teri Cox; Gordon Caffey; Rick Calhoun; Alan Eidson; Marynell Branch
- Past members: Mike Perkins; DeWayne Hayes; Chris Pyle; Grant Tennille
- Website: Official Myspace page

Capitol Offense is an American rock band. It is most notable for its bassist, Mike Huckabee, who is the former Governor of Arkansas and former 2008 Republican candidate for President of the United States.

== History ==
=== Early years (1996–2000) ===
The band was formed in July 1996 by newly elected governor Mike Huckabee and members of his executive staff: Chris Pyle (drums), DeWayne Hayes (lead guitar), and Mike Perkins (vocals), who all enjoyed classic rock. They drew their name from the fact that all of them work in the Capitol building, and because according to Huckabee, "in the course of our playing, we offend just about everybody." The band's first performance was at a Governor's staff Christmas party in 1996, where their setlist consisted of Chuck Berry's "Rock and Roll Music," Barrett Strong's "Money (That's What I Want)", and the Beatles' "Come Together." Thereafter, the band would often play at Governor's staff events. In 1999, the band gave a performance in the Governor's Conference Room, during a bill-signing ceremony in honor of Arkansas native Johnny Cash. The band was also a regular guest at the annual Hope Watermelon Festival in Huckabee's hometown of Hope, Arkansas.

Huckabee, by far the most famous member of the band, was drawn to music from very early on in his life. He has played guitar since he was a child and states unequivocally that "music was life-changing for me."

=== Recent times (2001–present) ===
Huckabee's band played at Washington inaugural balls put on by the Free Republic in both 2001 and 2005. In recent years Capitol Offense has honed their sound to such an extent that they have opened for several high-profile artists, including The Charlie Daniels Band, Dionne Warwick, REO Speedwagon, Willie Nelson, Percy Sledge, 38 Special, and Grand Funk Railroad. In 2007, Huckabee took his musical act on the presidential stump with him, performing numerous times without Capitol Offense during his campaign in Iowa. At one stop, backed by two record store employees, he covered a Chuck Berry song, before answering questions from the crowd at the store. During Huckabee's 2008 campaign, Boston's guitarist and songwriter Tom Scholz, a supporter of Democratic candidate Barack Obama wrote to Huckabee, requesting him to stop performing the Boston song "More than a Feeling" at public appearances. Huckabee was reported to have been regularly playing the song, sometimes with former Boston band member Barry Goudreau (who was a Huckabee supporter).

== Style ==
Capitol Offense is a cover band that plays a mix of classic rock, Motown, country and blues.

== Lineup ==
Current members

- Mike Huckabee – bass
- Aaron Black – vocals
- Steve Pyle – vocals
- Teri Cox – vocals
- Gordon Caffey – lead guitar, vocals
- Rick Calhoun – guitar, vocals
- Alan Eidson – drums
- Marynell Branch – keyboard

Past members

- Mike Perkins – vocals (1996)
- DeWayne Hayes – lead guitar (1996–2003)
- Chris Pyle – drums (1996–2010)
- Grant Tennille – vocals (1997–1999)
