= Jim Geraghty =

American political commentator

- Geraghty in 2026
- Born: July 5, 1975 (age 51)
- Occupations: Journalist; political commentator
- Years active: 2001–present
- Employer(s): National Review (2004–present); Philadelphia Inquirer (2011–present); The Washington Post (2022–present)

James Richard "Jim" Geraghty (/ˈɡɛrəti/ GHERR-ə-tee; born July 5, 1975) is the senior political correspondent of National Review and author of several books. Since 2022, he has also been a contributing columnist for The Washington Post.

== Career ==
During the 2004 U.S. presidential election, Geraghty was often critical of Democratic Party presidential candidate John Kerry. At the time his weblog used the name "The Kerry Spot". It was later renamed "TKS". Geraghty reported on the Killian documents and Rathergate stories on a daily basis on behalf of National Review and was critical of CBS and Dan Rather. Geraghty was one of the self described Pajamahadeen.

Starting in March 2005, Geraghty posted to TKS from Turkey, where he lived as an expatriate. In January 2007, he moved from TKS to a new blog, originally named "The Hillary Spot", but since renamed to "The Campaign Spot".

Geraghty's first book, Voting to Kill: How 9/11 Launched the Era of Republican Leadership (Touchstone, ISBN 0-7432-9042-9) was published in 2006. He wrote the novel The Weed Agency, published by Crown Forum in June 2014, and coauthored Heavy Lifting with Cam Edwards, published by Regnery in October 2015.

In November 2022, he argued in the Washington Post that Florida's governor, Ron DeSantis, "would represent a return to normality" if elected U.S. president in 2024.
