= Joseph Malchow =

American entrepreneur and venture capitalist

Joseph I. Malchow
- Born: 1985 (age 40–41); Princeton, New Jersey
- Education: Dartmouth College, Stanford Law School
- Occupation: Venture capitalist

Joseph Malchow is an American entrepreneur and venture capitalist. He is the founding general partner at HNVR Technology Investment Management, an investment company based in Portola Valley.

Malchow as a venture capitalist supports high-tech companies with investment and advice on business formation and technology strategy. He is a partner of the blog Power Line.

In 2012, Forbes named Malchow to its 30 Under 30 list.

== Early life ==
Malchow was born in Princeton, New Jersey and grew up in Scotch Plains, New Jersey.

Malchow holds an A.B. from Dartmouth College and a J.D. from Stanford Law School.

== Career ==
At 16 he founded JetWare, a software company that developed and sold to consumers applications for Palm OS-powered mobile devices. JetWare's products included Studentmate, which was among the first mobile applications intended for use in the academic environment. The New York Times covered JetWare and Malchow as innovators in mobile computing. Malchow attended Dartmouth College, where he graduated as a James O. Baker Presidential Scholar. At Dartmouth, Malchow led a campaign that placed four independent directors on the Board of Trustees of Dartmouth College. Malchow's involvement was profiled in a 2008 Dartmouth Alumni Magazine article by Jake Tapper. Malchow later discussed this episode in an article co-authored with attorney Harvey A. Silverglate.

In 2007 The Wall Street Journal named Malchow a Robert L. Bartley fellow. He continued to publish regularly in The Wall Street Journal.

After Dartmouth, Malchow worked with semiconductor pioneer T.J. Rodgers from 2008 to 2010. In 2010 he cofounded Publir, a digital advertising exchange focusing on providing programmatic advertisements to publications ranging from The Atlantic to RealClearPolitics. Publir is one of the largest invitation-only ad exchanges in the U.S. Digital media properties published by Malchow or monetized by companies he founded reach an average monthly audience of 35 million.

Malchow is an active investor in software and energy companies. In March 2020, Malchow was elected to the Board of Directors of the energy technology company Enphase Energy. He was among the youngest independent directors elected to the board of an S&P 500 company.

In July 2021 Malchow investment Enovix Corporation, a Fremont, California-based maker of advanced lithium-ion batteries, went public. In August 2021, it was announced that Malchow was elected to the Board of Directors of Archaea Energy, a technology company engaged in landfill gas utilization and the largest renewable gas producer in the United States. Of clean energy companies reaching public markets by special-purpose acquisition company, the Malchow investments represented the two highest-returning companies in that year. In October 2022, it was announced that BP would acquire Archaea in a $4.1 billion deal.

== Investments ==
Malchow's investments include RelatelQ, Socotra, Sourcegraph, Material Security, Elementl, Retool, Premise Data, Golden, Mattermost, Solugen, and Flatfile.

== Politics and other interests ==
Malchow was a critic of the U.S. federal government response to the COVID-19 pandemic, writing in March 2020 in The Wall Street Journal that "a simple one-variable correlation of deaths per million and days to shutdown" showed that "[t]he correlation coefficient was 5.5%" and suggesting that the data "may prove that many aspects of the U.S. shutdown were mistakes—ineffective but economically devastating."

Malchow has written against government influence in the technology sector, particularly with respect to industries where he has built public companies, including Sustainable energy, Solar energy, Power electronics, and Lithium-ion batteries. Shortly after the passage of the Inflation Reduction Act of 2022, Malchow wrote in The Wall Street Journal that "energy['s] future may mirror computing’s past. Rapid cycles of learning yielded step changes in efficiency. When critical thresholds are passed, trillions of dollars in uncoordinated economic potential are unleashed. It happened with metal-oxide semiconductors in the 1990s and is happening with lithium-ion batteries today. But the economy receives this benefit only if a price system untouched by government is allowed to exist."

Malchow was named to the board of directors of the National Civic Art Society in 2018, alongside Roger Scruton. According to Architectural Record, in January 2020, President Donald Trump drafted an executive order "to ensure that 'the classical architectural style shall be the preferred and default style' for new and upgraded federal buildings." The reforms, which were addressed to the General Services Administration, were publicly connected with NCAS.
