= Los Angeles Times v. Free Republic =

2000 United States copyright law case

- Court: United States District Court for the Central District of California
- Full case name: Los Angeles Times v. Free Republic
- Decided: November 16, 2000
- Docket nos.: 2:98-cv-07840
- Citation: 56 U.S.P.Q.2d 1862; 29 Med. L. Rptr. 1028

Court membership
- Judge sitting: Margaret M. Morrow

Los Angeles Times v. Free Republic, 56 U.S.P.Q.2d 1862 (C.D. Cal. 2000), is a United States district court copyright law case. Several newspapers sued the Internet forum Free Republic for allowing its users to repost the full text of copyrighted newspaper articles, asserting that this constituted copyright infringement. Free Republic claimed that they were not liable under the doctrine of fair use and the First Amendment guarantee of freedom of speech. The federal courts ruled in favor of the newspapers.

== Background ==
Free Republic, an Internet forum for Republican and conservative activists, was founded in 1996 by Jim Robinson of Fresno, California, and gained popularity during the impeachment of Bill Clinton.

During the first few years of its existence, Free Republic's members made a practice of posting and archiving the full text of copyrighted news articles on its website, despite the objection of the copyright holders.

The website homepage stated:

Any man, corporation or government entity who wants to challenge our right to discuss news accounts (copyrighted or not) of public policy issues or political events or of government corruption, etc., in our non-commercial, not-for-profit, public electronic townhall forum should first examine each and every word of the First Amendment above and then tell us which words they don't understand.

— Jim Robinson

== District court proceedings ==
In December 1997, the Los Angeles Times, The Washington Post, and other newspapers sent cease-and-desist letters by certified mail to Free Republic and to Robinson demanding that they stop republishing and archiving full-text articles of copyrighted materials. Robinson defiantly refused, saying that before he would agree to excerpt and link—that is, to post only excerpts of articles and use hyperlinks to the original source for the full text—the newspapers would have to "rip the keyboard from his cold dead fingers" (a reference to the famous statement, "I'll give you my gun when you take it from my cold, dead hands").

On September 28, 1998, the Los Angeles Times, The Washington Post Company, and the Washingtonpost.Newsweek Interactive (the wholly owned subsidiary of The Washington Post Company that produces the online version of The Washington Post, washingtonpost.com) filed suit in the United States District Court for the Central District of California against Robinson, Free Republic, and Electronic Orchard alleging copyright infringement. (Electronic Orchard was the name of a "business of unknown legal form" that conducted website development and "regularly and extensively advertised" its services on Free Republic and was owned and controlled by Robinson as Free Republic was). Ten more defendants only known by the usernames were sued as Does 1 through 10. The complaint stated that Free Republic (the "Infringing Website") had contained "dozens if not hundreds of Plaintiffs' copyrighted articles," and named ten examples (one each for Does 1 through 10).

The ensuing court battle over the next four years revolved around issues of copyright and fair use. Robinson characterized it as "a life and death struggle with elements of the socialist propaganda machine, namely, the Los Angeles Times and The Washington Post."

The newspapers were represented by Rex S. Heinke, originally of the law firm of Gibson, Dunn & Crutcher. During the litigation he moved first to the firm of Greines, Martin, Stein & Richland, LLP, of Beverly Hills, then to the Los Angeles firm of Akin, Gump, Strauss, Hauer & Feld. Free Republic were represented by the now-disbarred attorney Brian Langford Buckley and the Newport Beach-based David Flyer.

Free Republic responded to the suit by raising an affirmative defense of fair use. The plaintiffs moved for partial summary adjudication on defendants' fair use defense on October 4, 1999, and cross-filed for summary judgment citing a First Amendment defense on October 19 under seal. Judge Margaret M. Morrow issued a preliminary ruling on November 8, 1999, rejecting the "fair use" argument. On April 4, 2000, Morrow issued an order granting partial summary judgment to the plaintiffs and denying the defendant's motion for summary judgment. In this opinion, Morrow set out the federal standard for fair use of copyrighted materials, which has been the basis of authority in all subsequent litigation.

Plaintiff filed for summary judgment on the remaining issues of permanent injunction and damages on June 5, 2000. The defendants failed to file any opposition to the plaintiff's second motion for summary judgment and claiming they had not been served, but that the point did not matter as they "did not oppose the relief being requested."

The defendants waived their remaining defenses and stipulated to the entry of final judgment in district court with a stay on execution, preserving their right to appeal to the United States Court of Appeals for the Ninth Circuit only on fair use and First Amendment grounds. The stipulation that defendants agreed to on November 16, 2000, gave plaintiffs a permanent injunction against posting full-text versions of copyrighted materials, ordered archived articles be removed, and awarded the plaintiffs $1 million in damages, but no attorney's fees. Robinson claimed to be judgment-proof, saying "Practically speaking, we were already bankrupt long before any of this got started. We just did not have, and still do not have any assets to protect..."

== Appeal ==
Brian Langford Buckley filed the defendant's appeal to the Ninth Circuit Court of Appeals on December 15, 2001. The appellant's opening brief was filed April 20, the appellee's brief was filed May 31, and the appellant's reply was filed June 25. On September 1, the Defendant's attorney was declared inactive by the State Bar of California due to noncompliance with Minimum Continuing Legal Education (MCLE) requirements. He was therefore declared not eligible to practice law. Buckley and Robinson later clashed publicly regarding related legal matters, and Buckley was banned from Free Republic. On October 5, the defendants notified the court of appeals of their substitution of counsel.

The parties then began negotiating a settlement. The parties ultimately agreed that in return for Defendants dropping their appeal and agreeing to both endorse the Stipulation for Entry of Amended Final Judgment containing the Permanent Injunction Order and link to it on the Free Republic homepage, the defendants would only be jointly and severally liable to the newspapers for $5,000 each, which was not described as damages or legal fees, and the Court found that plaintiffs had "no 'adequate legal remedy' other than a permanent injunction to protect them against further acts of copyright infringements by the three named defendants."

Robinson announced the decision to drop the appeal and begin excerpting and linking articles on June 19, 2002, saying "Well, my fingers are not cold and dead and my keyboard has not been ripped away." Thousands of threads were subsequently deleted from the archives as Times and Post articles were purged. Free Republic has complied with other post-litigation requests from other copyright owners such as USA Today to excerpt and link.
