= Louis Boccardi =

American businessman

Louis D. Boccardi was president and chief executive officer of The Associated Press (AP), the world's largest news organization, from 1985 until his retirement in 2003. Prior to assuming the presidency, he served one year as Executive Vice President and Chief Operating Officer and 10 years as executive editor in charge of AP's news operations.

During his tenure as CEO, Boccardi repaired the news cooperative's sometimes-shaky finances and started the process of moving AP's news report into the Internet age. That process has quickened substantially under his successor, Tom Curley.

Born in New York City, Boccardi holds a bachelor's degree from Fordham University and a master's degree in journalism from Columbia University. He joined the AP as executive assistant to the general news editor in 1967 after eight years with New York newspapers, during which he rose to the position of assistant managing editor of the New York World-Telegram and Sun and its successor newspaper, the New York World Journal Tribune. He was appointed AP managing editor in 1969, executive editor in 1973 and vice president in 1975.

In 1990, Boccardi was elected a fellow of the Society of Professional Journalists (SPJ), the highest honor SPJ awards journalists for public service. He has received the William Allen White Foundation Award for Journalistic Merit, the Overseas Press Club Lifetime Achievement Award, and the Columbia University Graduate School of Journalism Award and was elected a Distinguished Service Member of the American Society of Newspaper Editors. Boccardi and the AP were awarded the 2001 John Peter and Anna Catherine Zenger award for Freedom of the Press and the Public's Right to Know.

Boccardi was a member of the Pulitzer Prize Board from 1994 to 2003 and Chairman of the Pulitzer Prize Board in 2002. Boccardi was a member of the Gannett Board of Directors from 2003 to 2006.

Boccardi is a member of the national advisory board of the Freedom Forum Center for Media Studies, and a trustee emeritus of the Newseum, and the board of visitors of Columbia's Graduate School of Journalism, and is an honorary trustee of the William Allen White Foundation at the University of Kansas.

He is a member of the special committee appointed to monitor the editorial integrity of The Wall Street Journal after its purchase by News Corp.
