= Bill Burkett =

American National Guard officer

Bill Loyd Burkett (November 16, 1949 – February 27, 2024) was the CBS source in the Killian documents affair of 2004. He retired as a Lieutenant Colonel from the Texas Army National Guard.

He claimed that in 1997, while outside the governor's office in Austin, he overheard a conversation about "wanting to bury George W. Bush's Vietnam service record". This has been disputed.

Burkett had received publicity in 2000, after making and then retracting a claim that he had been transferred to Panama for refusing "to falsify personnel records of Governor Bush", and in February 2004, when he claimed to have knowledge of "scrubbing" of Bush's TexANG records. According to the review panel, investigations by major news outlets at the time, including CBS, "revealed inconsistencies... which led to questions regarding his credibility and whether his claims could be proven".

Burkett's claims about the origins of the documents changed several times since. He admitted to lying to CBS about the origin of the memos when he said he got them from fellow guardsman George Conn, then claiming that he received the Killian documents from a woman calling herself "Lucy Ramirez" who has never been identified. The documents, purported to have been typed in the early 1970s, were likely produced many years later with a computer using Microsoft Word on default settings. Burkett said he burned the originals after faxing copies of the documents to CBS.

When asked about Burkett's role in the controversy, David Van Os, Burkett's lawyer, responded with the hypothesis that someone may have reconstructed documents that they believed existed in 1972 or 1973.

On February 27, 2024, Burkett died in Belle Plain, Texas.

== See also ==
- Truth
