= 60 Minutes II =

American television program

- Also known as: 60 Minutes Wednesday; 60 Minutes
- Genre: News magazine
- Country of origin: United States

Production
- Running time: 45–48 minutes

Original release
- Network: CBS
- Release: January 13, 1999 – September 2, 2005

Related
- 60 Minutes

60 Minutes II (also known as 60 Minutes Wednesday and 60 Minutes) is an American prime time news magazine that was broadcast by CBS from January 13, 1999 to September 2, 2005. The series was a weeknight spin-off of CBS's long-running Sunday-evening news magazine 60 Minutes; it followed a similar style and format to its parent show, but with a different production team led by Jeff Fager. It also featured rebroadcasts and follow-ups to classic 60 Minutes stories.

It initially aired on Wednesday nights. In 2004, the program was renamed to simply 60 Minutes (or 60 Minutes Wednesday) to alleviate a perception that the program was of lower quality than the flagship Sunday edition. The show was later moved to a Friday time slot, where it completed its run.

== History ==
In early-1998, it was reported that CBS News was developing a spinoff of 60 Minutes known as 60 Minutes II, seeking to compete with the viewership seen by weeknight competitors such as 20/20 and Dateline NBC. Some CBS employees internally referred to the spinoff as 60 Minutes Jr., in reference to the junior producers assigned to the program. The network was considering having the new show be either a reimagining of 60 Minutes with a new format, or simply a second edition of the existing show with a separate production team. 60 Minutes creator Don Hewitt expressed concerns regarding the spin-off, stating that he wanted to "burst upon the scene with a news magazine that's every bit as different and worthy as 60 Minutes was 30 years ago", and not "a rip-off" of itself or its competitors.

The spinoff was announced in July 1998 as 60 Minutes II, for a premiere in January 1999. CBS News president Andrew Heyward and CBS head Les Moonves reassured Hewitt and his colleagues that the show would not be a "watered down", tabloid version of 60 Minutes, and would maintain its journalistic standards and signature style. This mandate would be bolstered by the involvement of figures such as then-CBS Evening News producer Jeff Fager as executive producer, and correspondents such as Dan Rather, Charlie Rose, and Vicki Mabrey among others. 60 Minutes II premiered on January 13, 1999, with its first segment being a story on Krasnoyarsk-26 produced by George Crile III.

In May 2004, it was announced that the program would be retitled to simply 60 Minutes (or alternatively 60 Minutes Wednesday) beginning in the upcoming television season, to match the branding of its parent program. Heyward explained that the 60 Minutes II branding was giving viewers a false impression that the show was of lower quality.

== Format ==
60 Minutes II would follow a similar format to the original 60 Minutes, with three stories per-episode. One of the stories would revisit a report from a previous 60 Minutes episode, accompanied by a follow-up segment with updates on its subject.

== Correspondents ==
Credited cast on 60 Minutes II included the following CBS correspondents: Dan Rather, Bob Simon, Charlie Rose, Vicki Mabrey, Scott Pelley and Lara Logan. The following correspondents also worked on segments for the program: Christiane Amanpour, Ed Gordon, Jim Stewart, Charles Grodin, Carol Marin and Jimmy Tingle. The correspondents from 60 Minutes have reported several stories on 60 Minutes II, Ed Bradley also reported several one-hour special stories as well.

Correspondents such as Jimmy Tingle contributed semi-humorous commentaries, paralleling those given by Andy Rooney on the main program.

== Killian documents controversy ==
60 Minutes II ran into controversy in September 2004 when the program staff received a set of documents which alleged that, while in the service of the Texas Air National Guard, United States President George W. Bush was declared unfit for duty and suspended from service. On September 8, 2004, in the middle of the 2004 Presidential election, Dan Rather went on the air on 60 Minutes II with the documents. The authenticity of these documents was quickly called into question by experts and critics. This became known as the Killian documents controversy (or "Rathergate").

For about two weeks, Rather and his team stood by the story, but CBS later announced it could not vouch for the authenticity of the memos. The network stated that using the memos was a "mistake" and Rather apologized for the incident.

These events would lead to Rather's eventual departure from the anchor chair and ouster as correspondent from CBS News on March 9, 2005. Rather later sued in a multi-million dollar employment lawsuit.

== Awards ==
60 Minutes II earned a number of awards, including several Emmy Awards and three Peabody Awards.
