= Barack Obama presidential eligibility litigation =

Numerous lawsuits and ballot challenges, based on conspiracy theories related to Barack Obama's eligibility for the United States presidency, were filed following his first election in 2008 and over the course of his two terms as president. These actions sought to have Obama disqualified from running for, or being confirmed for, the Presidency of the United States, to declare his actions in office to be null and void, or to compel him to release additional documentation related to his U.S. citizenship.

== Challenges ==
By early 2012, dozens of lawsuits had been filed challenging Obama's eligibility in states including North Carolina, Ohio, Pennsylvania, Hawaii, Connecticut, New Jersey, Texas and Washington. No suit or challenge resulted in the grant of any relief to the plaintiffs by any court or other body.

== Obstacles ==
A major obstacle to most citizen suits has been lack of standing. In the initial wave of lawsuits challenging the validity of the 2008 presidential election, the only plaintiff who was a presidential candidate or presidential elector was Alan Keyes. The importance of the doctrine of standing was explained by Judge R. Barclay Surrick of the United States District Court for the Eastern District of Pennsylvania in dismissing one suit. He noted that one of the principal aims of the doctrine is to prevent courts from deciding questions "where the harm is too vague." This was especially true for a presidential election, where a disgruntled voter who suffered no individual harm "would have us derail the democratic process by invalidating a candidate for whom millions of people voted and who underwent excessive vetting during what was one of the most hotly contested presidential primary in living memory."

== Long form ==
On April 27, 2011, Obama released his original Hawaii long-form birth certificate. Donald Trump took credit for Obama's birth certificate release, but at the same time questioned its authenticity.

== Civil suits ==
=== Federal ===
==== Berg v. Obama ====
On August 21, 2008, Pennsylvania attorney Philip J. Berg, a Democrat and former deputy state attorney general, filed a complaint alleging that Obama was born in Kenya, not Hawaii, and was therefore a citizen of Kenya or possibly Indonesia, where he lived as a child. He alleged that the "Certification of Live Birth" on Obama's website is a forgery. U.S. District Judge R. Barclay Surrick dismissed the complaint in October 2008, finding that Berg lacked standing to bring the case and that his attempts to gain standing to pursue his claim were "frivolous and not worthy of discussion."

Bypassing the United States Court of Appeals for the Third Circuit, Berg filed a petition for a writ of certiorari before judgment in the United States Supreme Court. On December 10, 2008, the Supreme Court denied Berg's request for an injunction against the seating of the Electoral College, scheduled for December 15. On December 15, 2008, the petitioner refiled the application for injunction. Two days later, Berg's appeal was denied without comment by Supreme Court Justice Anthony Kennedy. Berg's previously denied request for an injunction was refiled with Justice Antonin Scalia on December 18, 2008. On January 12, the Supreme Court denied the petition for certiorari. The application for stay addressed to Justice Scalia and referred to the Court was also summarily denied on January 21, 2009.

On November 12, 2009, the United States Court of Appeals for the Third Circuit affirmed the district court's ruling that Berg lacked standing.

==== Essek v. Obama ====
On November 25, 2008, Daniel John Essek of Whitley County, Kentucky, filed a pro se federal lawsuit in the Kentucky Eastern District Court. The suit was originally filed as a Freedom of Information Act case, but was amended to a judicial challenge to Obama's qualifications for the Office of President of the United States. Essek sought to prevent the inauguration of Barack Obama on the grounds that Obama was not a natural born citizen based on allegations that Obama was born in Kenya. District Judge Gregory F. Van Tatenhove dismissed the suit because of a lack of subject matter jurisdiction, stating that Mr. Essek's grievance was the generalized grievance of a voter, not a specific injury that would have granted him standing to sue.

==== Kerchner v. Obama ====
On January 20, 2009, Attorney Mario Apuzzo filed a lawsuit in federal court, on behalf of Charles Kerchner and other plaintiffs, suing President-Elect Barack Obama, the United States Congress, Dick Cheney, and Nancy Pelosi alleging Obama was ineligible to be president, and that Congress failed to verify Obama's eligibility. A federal district court in New Jersey dismissed the suit, ruling the plaintiffs lacked standing. On July 3, 2010, the United States Court of Appeals for the Third Circuit, citing Berg v. Obama, affirmed the dismissal, and ordered Apuzzo to show cause why he should not be sanctioned for initiating a frivolous appeal. Apuzzo's subsequent request for a hearing was denied, but the order to show cause was discharged. On November 29, 2010, the U.S. Supreme Court declined, without comment, to hear the case.

==== Barnett v. Obama ====
On January 20, 2009, Orly Taitz filed a lawsuit in federal court, Alan Keyes et al v. Barack H. Obama et al against Obama, with Wiley Drake as one of the named parties for the plaintiff. On July 13, 2009, the presiding judge dismissed the case without prejudice on technical grounds, and on July 14, 2009, Taitz refiled a "First Amended Complaint" Captain Pamela Barnett v. Barack Hussein Obama on behalf of Alan Keyes, Wiley Drake, Cynthia Davis, Gail Lightfoot, several other local politicians, and various armed service members. Taitz sought a declaratory judgment that Obama is ineligible for office and an injunction to void his actions and appointments as President.

Two of the plaintiffs, Markham Robinson and Drake, subsequently attempted to dismiss their attorney, Orly Taitz, who refused to sign their substitution-of-attorney documents and instead filed to dismiss the two of them as plaintiffs in the case. On September 8, 2009, Judge David O. Carter denied the dismissal of Drake and Robinson as plaintiffs, and granted their motion to substitute Gary Kreep of the United States Justice Foundation as counsel for them, refused to dismiss Magistrate Judge Arthur Nakazato from the case, and set a tentative trial date for January 26, 2010.

At a hearing on October 5, 2009, Carter considered the defendants' Motion to Dismiss and declined to rule from the bench, saying that he would take the matter under advisement. On October 7, 2009, he released a Minute Order finalizing the previously tentative dates for summary judgment motions and trial, and on October 29, 2009, he dismissed the case. On December 22, 2011, the United States Court of Appeals for the Ninth Circuit affirmed the dismissal, ruling the plaintiffs lacked standing to challenge the eligibility of the sitting president. On June 11, 2012, the U.S. Supreme Court declined, without comment, to hear the case.

Citing new evidence, on August 14, 2012, Taitz filed a motion in Judge Carter's court to re-open the case. The motion was denied on August 31, 2012.

==== Hollister v. Soetoro ====
On March 5, 2009, a lawsuit filed by Philip Berg on behalf of Gregory S. Hollister, a retired Air Force colonel, against Barack Obama (referenced as "Barry Soetoro", the name given at the time of his enrollment in an Indonesian elementary school). The suit was dismissed in the United States District Court for the District of Columbia. The presiding judge, James Robertson, said the case was a waste of the court's time, calling Berg and another lawyer "agents provocateurs" and their local counsel, John Hemenway, "a foot soldier in their crusade." He ordered Hemenway to show cause why he should not pay the legal fees for Obama's attorney as a penalty for filing a complaint "for an improper purpose such as to harass". The district court ultimately reprimanded Hemenway for his actions, and the United States Court of Appeals for the District of Columbia Circuit upheld the dismissal of the case and Hemenway's reprimand. On January 18, 2011, the U.S. Supreme Court declined, without comment, to hear the case.

==== Cook v. Good ====
On February 1, 2009, Stefan F. Cook, a major in the United States Army Reserve, contacted Taitz via e-mail, asking to be part of her lawsuit. On May 8, he volunteered to serve for one year in Afghanistan beginning on July 15, 2009. The Army accepted his offer and ordered him to report on that date. On July 8, however, he filed suit, with Taitz as his lawyer, seeking a temporary restraining order and status as a conscientious objector, arguing that his deployment orders were invalid because Obama was not a natural-born U.S. citizen, and therefore ineligible to serve as commander-in-chief of the armed forces. His orders were thereupon revoked; an army spokesperson stated, "A reserve soldier who volunteers for an active duty tour may ask for a revocation of orders up until the day he is scheduled to report for active duty." Accordingly, Cook's case was dismissed as moot on July 16.

In the lawsuit, captioned Stefan Frederick Cook v. Wanda L. Good (Colonel Wanda L. Good -Commander, U.S. Army Human Resources Command – St. Louis) and filed in the United States District Court for the Middle District of Georgia, Cook asserted that he "would be acting in violation of international law by engaging in military actions outside the United States under this President's command. ... simultaneously subjecting himself to possible prosecution as a war criminal by the faithful execution of these duties." In April, before Cook volunteered for deployment to Afghanistan, he had been included in Taitz's list of people she said she represented as plaintiffs, in a letter raising the citizenship issue. A retired Army major general and an active reserve US Air Force lieutenant colonel subsequently joined the Georgia case as plaintiffs alongside Cook. Cook's deployment orders were canceled, and a government spokesman explained, "The Commanding General of SOCCENT (U.S. Special Operations Central Command) has determined that he does not want the services of Major Cook, and has revoked his deployment orders." An Army CENTCOM spokesman rejected as false claims that the revocation validated Cook's claims: "This in no way validates any of the outlandish claims made by Maj. Cook or his attorney. The idea that this validates those charges about the president's fitness for office is simply false."

After the case was filed, Taitz alleged that Cook had been terminated from his civilian job with a defense contractor, after the situation at his company had become "nutty and crazy".

Cook received significant media coverage on July 16, 2009, from Fox News's Sean Hannity.

After the lawsuit was reported in the Columbus Ledger-Enquirer, the newspaper reported receiving "the highest volume of traffic ever by a single story in the history of ledger-enquirer.com, including written threats against the newspaper", with nearly half a million new readers and hundreds of e-mails. The threats prompted an increase in security around the courthouse where Cook's case was heard, as well as precautions being taken to protect the author of the newspaper's reports on the case. Executive Editor Ben Holden noted: "The chatter had the feel of a righteous cause – almost a religious cause – because some people hate this president."

==== Rhodes v. Macdonald ====
In September 2009, Taitz filed Rhodes v. MacDonald (Colonel Thomas MacDonald – garrison commander, Fort Benning, Georgia) on behalf of Captain Connie Rhodes, a U.S. Army physician, sought a restraining order to stop Rhodes' forthcoming deployment to Iraq. In the request for a restraining order, Taitz argued the order was illegal since Obama was illegally serving as President. On September 16, federal judge Clay D. Land (the same judge who heard Cook v. Good) rejected the motion and denounced it as frivolous.

Within hours of Land's decision, Taitz told the news site Talking Points Memo that she felt Land's refusal to hear her case was an act of treason. Two days later, she filed a motion to stay Rhodes' deployment pending rehearing of the dismissal order. She repeated her treason allegations against Land and made several other intemperate statements, including claims that Land was aiding and abetting purported aspirations of "dictatorship" by Obama. Land rejected the motion as frivolous and ordered her to show cause why she should not be fined $10,000 for abuse of judicial process.

A few hours later, a letter bearing Rhodes's signature arrived, stating that Taitz filed the motion without her knowledge or consent, asking Land to remove Taitz as her attorney of record in the case, and stating that it was her "plan to file a complaint with the California State Bar due to [Taitz's] reprehensible and unprofessional actions." On September 26, 2009, Taitz filed a motion with the court seeking to withdraw as counsel for Rhodes, so she could divulge in court "privileged attorney-client communications" since the dismissed Rhodes case "is now a quasi-criminal prosecution of the undersigned attorney, for the purpose of punishment."

On October 13, 2009, Judge Clay Land ordered "Counsel Orly Taitz ... to pay $20,000 to the United States, through the Middle District of Georgia Clerk's Office, within thirty days of the date of this Order as a sanction for her misconduct in violation of Rule 11 of the Federal Rules of Civil Procedure." Land's decision stated:

The Court finds that counsel's conduct was willful and not merely negligent. It demonstrates bad faith on her part. As an attorney, she is deemed to have known better. She owed a duty to follow the rules and to respect the Court. Counsel's pattern of conduct conclusively establishes that she did not mistakenly violate a provision of law. She knowingly violated Rule 11. Her response to the Court's show cause order is breathtaking in its arrogance and borders on delusional. She expresses no contrition or regret regarding her misconduct. To the contrary, she continues her baseless attacks on the Court.

Upon learning of Land's ruling, Taitz said she would appeal the sanction, declaring that Judge Land was "scared to go against the regime" of the "oppressive" Obama administration, and that the sanction was an attempt to "intimidate" her. On March 15, 2010, the United States Court of Appeals for the Eleventh Circuit affirmed the sanctions against Taitz. On August 9, 2010, the federal government filed an abstract of judgment, a document placing a lien in the amount of $20,000 plus interest on all her real property, prompting Taitz to say, "I will pay the money, and I will continue fighting." On January 10, 2011, the U.S. Supreme Court declined, without comment, to hear the case.

==== Taitz v. Obama ====
On January 27, 2010, Taitz, in propria persona, filed a petition for writ of quo warranto. On April 14, 2010, U.S. District Court Chief Judge Royce C. Lamberth dismissed the petition; and, alluding to the novel Don Quixote, he wrote, "The Court is not willing to go tilting at windmills with her."

==== Taitz v. Astrue ====
In February 2011, Taitz filed, in propria persona, a Freedom of Information Act suit against the Social Security Administration, alleging the agency improperly refused to disclose to her information about Obama's social security number. After Taitz repeatedly failed to follow the court rule regarding the redaction of social security numbers in court filings, Chief Judge Lamberth wrote that Taitz "is either toying with the Court or displaying her own stupidity… There is no logical explanation she can provide as to why she is now wasting the Court’s time, as well as the staff’s time, with these improper redactions." On August 30, 2011, the court granted summary judgment in favor of the government, writing "As her numerous filings with the Court demonstrate, plaintiff will stop at nothing to get to the bottom of this alleged conspiracy. Unfortunately for plaintiff, today is not her lucky day."

==== Taitz v. Ruemmler ====
Taitz sought to compel White House Counsel Kathryn Ruemmler under FOIA to grant access to Obama's "long form" birth certificate. On October 17, 2011, Chief Judge Lamberth noted Taitz's "Sisyphean quest" and dismissed the suit.

==== Archibald v. U.S. Department of Justice ====
In November 2011, George Archibald filed a FOIA suit seeking "information regarding Obama's birth in 1961, family background, citizenship, residency, immigration, expatriation/repatriation, and other matters related to Obama's origins and nationality generated during the FBI's 2008 investigation of presidential candidates".

==== Sibley v. Obama ====
Montgomery Blair Sibley, a disbarred attorney who once represented Deborah Jeane Palfrey (the "D.C. Madam"), sued Obama in January 2012, alleging that he is not a natural-born citizen and that his birth certificate is a forgery. A federal judge dismissed Sibley's suit on June 6, 2012. In March 2012, Sibley also filed his suit with the U.S. Supreme Court, stating that the district court had been "too slow" in considering his case.

=== State ===
==== Martin v. Lingle ====
On October 17, 2008, a lawsuit was filed in a state circuit court of Hawaii by Andy Martin, who was earlier declared by the U.S. Court of Appeals for the Eleventh Circuit to be a "notoriously vexatious and vindictive litigator who has long abused the American legal system", and who uses lawsuits as "a cruel and effective weapon against his enemies".

Martin's lawsuit sought to order the state to release a copy of Sen. Obama's long-form birth certificate. The short-form birth certificate that the Obama campaign posted online states his place of birth as Honolulu, Hawaii. Martin's lawsuit claimed that because Martin "strives for factual accuracy and attempts to conduct thorough research", he should have a copy of Obama's birth certificate from the state and not a certificate "posted on a Web site". Under Hawaii law, only the person whom the record is concerned with, or a spouse, parents, descendant or someone with a common ancestor, or someone acting on behalf of such a person can obtain a copy of a vital record.

The court denied Martin's petition, saying that Martin lacked "a direct and tangible interest in the record". The court cited Martin's lack of legal standing to obtain another person's birth document.

==== Donofrio v. Wells ====
In October 2008, Leo Donofrio, an attorney from New Jersey, filed suit against Nina Mitchell Wells, the Secretary of State of New Jersey, to challenge the eligibility of Obama, Republican presidential candidate John McCain (see details here) and the Socialist Workers Party candidate Roger Calero. Donofrio asserted that all three candidates were ineligible: Obama due to having dual U.S. and British nationality at birth (the latter via Obama's father), McCain due to being born in the Panama Canal Zone, and Calero due to allegedly still having Nicaraguan citizenship.

Donofrio was not among those who claimed Obama might have been born outside Hawaii. Also, Donofrio did not challenge the fact that Obama is a U.S. citizen and instead challenged only whether Obama is a natural-born citizen.

The case was referred to the Supreme Court by Justice Clarence Thomas. When the case reached the United States Supreme Court on December 8, 2008, the Court declined without comment to hear it.

==== Wrotnowski v. Bysiewicz ====
On October 31, 2008, Greenwich resident and health food store owner Cort Wrotnowski filed a suit in the Connecticut Supreme Court against then Secretary of State Susan Bysiewicz challenging the authenticity of presidential candidate Obama's Hawaii birth certificate. The suit was dismissed after initial hearings.

Wrotnowski appealed to the U.S. Supreme Court on November 25, contending that the British citizenship of Obama's father made the president-elect ineligible to assume office. Leo Donofrio, whose earlier case against Obama's eligibility had been turned down, assisted Wrotnowski's Supreme Court appeal. The request for stay or injunction was denied without comment on December 15, 2008. Thomas Goldstein, who has argued numerous cases before the court and covers Supreme Court cases, commented that "The law has always been understood to be, if you are born here, you're a natural born citizen. And that is particularly true in this case, when you have a U.S. citizen parent like Barack Obama's mother".

==== Keyes v. Bowen ====
On November 14, 2008, Alan Keyes and Markham Robinson, chairman of the American Independent Party and a California candidate for president elector, filed a lawsuit requesting that Obama provide documentation that he is a natural-born citizen of the United States. Keyes also said in an interview that he would not be in favor of amending this requirement of the Constitution. Keyes asserts that statements by Obama's paternal step-grandmother "raise doubts as to whether Barack Obama is in fact a natural born U.S. citizen, eligible to be president."

California Superior Court Judge Michael P. Kenny sustained, without leave to amend, Secretary Bowen's and Obama's demurrers on Keyes' petition for writ of mandate and granted Obama's motion to quash the subpoena. Keyes was found not to be entitled to the records he sought, thereby declaring the case moot. The California Court of Appeal affirmed the dismissal on October 25, 2010. The California Supreme Court declined, without comment, to review the case on February 2, 2011. On October 3, 2011, the U.S. Supreme Court declined, without comment, to hear the case.

==== Ankeny v. Governor of the State of Indiana ====
In December 2008, Steve Ankeny and Bill Kruse filed a "Petition for Extraordinary Writ of Prohibition" against Indiana governor Mitch Daniels to block "any popular votes for Barack Obama and Joe Biden for the appointment as Chief Electors [sic]." A hearing was held, and on March 16, 2009, Daniels' motion to dismiss was granted. The Plaintiffs appealed the ruling to the Indiana Court of Appeals, which upheld it on November 12, 2009.

The appellate decision addressed the question of whether Obama's eligibility was affected by his father's lack of U.S. citizenship, saying that "[b]ased upon the language of Article II, Section 1, Clause 4 and the guidance provided by Wong Kim Ark, we conclude that persons born within the borders of the United States are 'natural born Citizens' for Article II, Section 1 purposes, regardless of the citizenship of their parents." On April 1, 2010, the Indiana Supreme Court rejected, without comment, a request to consider the case.

==== Taitz v. Fuddy ====
In August 2011, Taitz filed, in propria persona, a suit against the director of the Hawaii Department of Health, seeking to review Obama's "long form" birth certificate. On October 12, 2011, the Hawaii Circuit Court dismissed Taitz's suit.

== 2012 election ==
=== 2012 primary ballot challenges ===
On April 24, 2012, Obama secured enough delegates to ensure the nomination of the Democratic party for reelection.

==== Alabama ====
A lawsuit filed by Albert Hendershot in December 2011 alleged Obama's birth certificate was forged and that he was ineligible to be on the Alabama primary ballot. On January 9, 2012, Hendershot's suit was dismissed due to lack of jurisdiction, and two similar suits were filed by Harold Sorensen and another Alabama citizen from Pell City. Sorensen requested that Judge Helen Shores Lee, who is black and also presided over Hendershot's suit, to recuse herself because "she has racial bias and a lack of Constitutional knowledge." The Pell City suit was dismissed on January 13, 2012. Sorenson's suit was dismissed for lack of jurisdiction on January 17, 2012, and the court awarded the Alabama Democratic Party its costs and fees; its attorney, however, promised not to collect the monies from Sorenson as long as he refrained from "bad-mouthing the court and this decision."

==== Alaska ====
Gordon Epperly filed an objection to Obama's placement on the ballot, writing, "As Barack Hussein Obama II is of the 'mulatto' race, his status of citizenship is founded upon the Fourteenth Amendment to the United States Constitution. Before the [purported] ratification of the Fourteenth Amendment, the race of 'Negro' or 'mulatto' had no standing to be citizens of the United States under the United States Constitution." The challenge was rejected as Alaska was not going to use a primary election to select delegates for the Democratic party.

==== Arizona ====
A lawsuit filed in an Arizona superior court by Kenneth Allen (Allen v. Arizona Democratic Party) alleged that Obama was not a natural-born citizen because his father "was a resident of Kenya and thus a British citizen". Allen argued that the U.S. Supreme Court's ruling in Minor v. Happersett required a natural-born citizen to be born in the U.S. of two U.S. citizen parents; however, the judge dismissed the suit on March 7, 2012, ruling that "President Obama is a natural born citizen under the Constitution" and that "[c]ontrary to Plaintiff's assertion, Minor v. Happersett ... does not hold otherwise."

==== California ====
Gary Kreep (one of the attorneys who filed Barnett v. Obama) filed on the behalf of seven other Californians a lawsuit demanding that the California Secretary of State verify the eligibility of all presidential candidates before putting them on the ballot.

In July 2012, Taitz sued to block the certification of the primary election results, alleging "rampant election fraud"; she also alleged Obama engaged in "identity fraud." Her suit was denied. In October, 2012, Taitz tried to revive her election lawsuit by asking the court to compel Occidental College to produce student records for President Barack Obama, who attended Occidental from 1979 to 1981. The judge ruled that Taitz's motion did not meet basic legal requirements and ordered her to pay $4,000 in sanctions to Occidental's lawyer for the cost of opposing the motion. The California Court of Appeal affirmed the dismissal and sanctions.

==== Florida ====
Two lawsuits filed in state court, including one filed by Larry Klayman, sought to have Obama declared ineligible. Joe Arpaio, the sheriff for Maricopa County, Arizona, submitted in support of Klayman's suit an affidavit stating "there is probable cause that [Obama's birth certificate] is a forgery." Klayman also sent Arpaio a subpoena directing him to appear in the Florida courtroom. The suit filed by Klayman was dismissed on June 29, 2012.

==== Georgia ====
Several Georgian citizens (Carl Swensson and another Georgian represented by Georgia state representative Mark Hatfield, a Georgian represented by Taitz, and a Georgian represented by Van Irion) filed challenges with the Georgia Secretary of State, Brian Kemp, regarding Obama's inclusion on the March primary ballot. Kemp referred the challenges to Deputy Chief Judge Michael Malihi, an administrative law judge, who denied Obama's motion to dismiss them and scheduled a hearing for January 26, 2012.

On January 23, 2012, Malihi denied Obama's motion to quash a subpoena issued by Taitz to compel Obama to appear, saying that Obama did not show why he should not be at the hearing or how his testimony would not be helpful. On January 25, Obama's attorney requested that Kemp halt the proceedings, and indicated that Obama would no longer participate in the litigation pending Kemp's decision. Kemp denied their request and warned that their non-participation would be "at your own peril".

Neither Obama nor his attorney appeared at the January 26 hearing. This normally would result in a default order, but the challengers requested Malihi to allow them to go ahead with the hearing and rule on "the merits of their arguments and evidence". Taitz called eight witnesses (including herself), and presented seven exhibits in support of her claims that Obama was not a natural-born citizen, has used multiple names, has multiple Social Security numbers, and used a fake birth certificate. Taitz asked Malihi to find Obama in contempt for failing to appear.

On February 3, 2012, Malihi recommended that Obama remain on the ballot. Concerning Taitz's case Malihi wrote: "The Court finds the testimony of the witnesses, as well as the exhibits tendered, to be of little, if any, probative value, and thus wholly insufficient to support plaintiffs’ allegations". The Drudge Retort described the hearing as, "Empty Table 1, Orly Taitz 0".

On February 6, 2012, Kemp accepted Malihi's recommendation. On February 13, the challengers filed for review.

==== Illinois ====
Three challenges were filed against Obama's inclusion on the Illinois ballot, including one that challenged his birth certificate.

==== Indiana ====
On February 24, Taitz appeared as a witness on the behalf of two residents of Indiana who had filed with the Indiana Election Commission a challenge to Obama's eligibility. The challengers demanded a default judgment against Obama, as neither he nor a representative appeared at the hearing; this motion was unanimously denied by the commission.

Taitz argued that the President's surname was not Obama, that he was not a natural-born citizen, and that he was using a stolen Social Security number. "When Taitz accused the commission of a cover-up, Dan Dumezich, the Merrillville Republican who is chairman of the commission, told her that if she was disrespectful one more time, 'your butt is going to be gone.'" The challenge was denied.

==== Mississippi ====
In February 2012, Taitz sued the Mississippi state Democratic Party and the Mississippi Secretary of State alleging Obama was not a natural born citizen. Taitz accused the party of aiding and abetting in forgery and fraud when it submitted to the court a copy of Obama's birth certificate. In response, the party filed with the court a certified verification from Hawaii's State Registrar attesting to the accuracy of Obama's birth certificate. Taitz accused the registrar of being complicit with the forgery.

==== New Hampshire ====
In November 2011, Taitz, backed by four New Hampshire state legislators, filed a complaint with the state's Ballot Law Commission challenging Obama's eligibility to compete in the primary election. As Obama had paid the filing fee and his declaration of candidacy conformed to state law, the Commission unanimously voted to keep Obama on the ballot. The Commission then denied a request for reconsideration.

In response, Taitz wrote to William L. O'Brien, the Speaker of the House of the New Hampshire House of Representatives, and demanded the removal of Bill Gardner, New Hampshire's Secretary of State, for "egregious elections fraud, aiding and abetting fraud, forgery and possibly treason." D.J. Bettencourt, House Majority Leader of the New Hampshire House of Representatives, wrote to Taitz and called her actions "unbecoming of any legitimate political dialogue, nevermind one as ridiculous as the continued obsession over President Obama's birth place." Bettencourt added, "I have spoken to the Representatives who were present and expressed to them my strong desire that they immediately disassociate themselves from you and this folly."

The aggrieved representatives then requested the New Hampshire Attorney General to investigate Obama's eligibility.

==== New Jersey ====
In April 2012, Mario Apuzzo (the attorney who filed Kerchner v. Obama) argued to an administrative law judge on behalf of two New Jersey residents that Obama had yet to prove his identity and eligibility, and thus should not be placed on the ballot.

Responding to the Petitioner's allegations that Barack Obama had not proven his eligibility, Administrative Law Judge Jeff S. Masin stated: "There appears to be no affirmative requirement that a person indorsed in a nominating petition for the Presidency present to the Secretary of State any certification or other proof that he is qualified for the Office." Further the judge ruled on the Plaintiff's assertions that Obama was ineligible due to his non-citizen father: "The petitioners’ legal position on this issue, however well-intentioned, has no merit in law." The decision to retain Barack Obama on the Primary Ballot was adopted by Kimberly M. Guadagno, New Jersey Secretary of State. The decision was upheld by the Appellate Division of New Jersey Superior Court on May 31, 2012. The New Jersey Primary was held on June 5.

==== Pennsylvania ====
A lawsuit filed by Charles Kerchner (lead plaintiff in Kerchner v. Obama) was dismissed on March 1, 2012, on the ground that the court had jurisdiction only to hear challenges to defects in the nominating papers, which did not include questions about Obama's status as a natural-born citizen. Two other suits, including one filed by Philip Berg (plaintiff in Berg v. Obama), were similarly dismissed.

==== South Dakota ====
In May 2012, Thomas Scheveck filed a complaint with the South Dakota Board of Elections, arguing that Obama is not a natural-born citizen because his father was not a U.S. citizen. Scheveck cited the Supreme Court's ruling in Minor v. Happersett to support his claim that only a person born of two American parents can qualify as a natural-born citizen. Scheck also alleged Obama had been using a fraudulent birth certificate and Social Security Number. In a unanimous decision on May 11, the elections board dismissed the complaint, citing a lack of jurisdiction to consider allegations of the type raised by Scheveck.

=== 2012 general election challenges ===
==== Illinois ====
On September 13, 2012, a state board rejected three challenges to Obama's placement on the November ballot, finding the challenges were raising arguments that had been previously rejected and based on "an incorrect legal interpretation of what constitutes a 'natural born citizen'".

==== Indiana ====
Taitz filed a lawsuit in Indiana, and attempted to subpoena Maricopa County, Arizona Sheriff Joe Arpaio and one of his assistants, Mike Zullo, to compel them to testify about the results of their investigation into Obama's birth certificate. Zullo indicated the two did not intend to attend the trial, stating, "We don't want our information tainted by a circus show".

==== Kansas ====
On September 10, 2012, Joe Montgomery filed a challenge to Obama being on the ballot, claiming that Obama's birth certificate was "doctored" and that he was not a natural-born citizen because he lacked two U.S. citizen parents. On September 14, Montgomery claimed there was "animosity and intimidation" directed at him as well as his "personal and professional associations," and withdrew his objection. At the September 17 meeting where the challenge was withdrawn, Taitz's request to speak was denied.

On September 20, Taitz filed a lawsuit in state court seeking to stay the board's actions. On November 2, 2012, the court dismissed Taitz's suit due to her lack of standing.

==== Mississippi ====
In a lawsuit initiated by Taitz, she claimed Obama's birth certificate and Social Security Number are fake, and sought to disqualify him from the ballot.

==== New York ====
Christopher Earl Strunk sued the New York State Board of Elections and others to prevent President Obama from appearing on the 2012 presidential ballot. Strunk alleged Obama was connected to a massive conspiracy theory involving the Jesuits and others. Judge Arthur Schack said of the case: "If the complaint in this action was a movie script, it would be entitled 'The Manchurian Candidate Meets The Da Vinci Code.'" Strunk was fined over $177,000 in costs and penalties.

=== Court challenges ===
==== Liberty Legal Foundation v. National Democratic Party ====
In October 2011, the Liberty Legal Foundation filed suit in Arizona, seeking to enjoin the Democratic National Committee from certifying Obama as its nominee for the 2012 U.S. presidential election on the ground that he did not have two citizen parents and thus, it contended, was not a natural-born citizen. The Foundation's complaint cited the U.S. Supreme Court's 1875 decision in Minor v. Happersett as supporting its claim that natural-born citizens were defined by the Supreme Court as "all children born in a country of parents who were its citizens". This lawsuit was dismissed July 11, 2012, for "lack of jurisdiction." A defense motion for sanctions against plaintiff's attorney, Irion, was denied.

An almost-identical lawsuit with the same parties was filed in Tennessee, and dismissed for lack of standing on June 21, 2012. On August 24, the district court sanctioned the plaintiff's attorney, Irion, for filing a lawsuit that he "knew or reasonably should have known that the claims in this case had no basis in law".

==== Tisdale v. Obama ====
On January 17, 2012, Charles Tisdale of Virginia brought a civil action before the U.S. District Court for the Eastern District of Virginia. In the suit, Tisdale alleged that Barack Obama, Mitt Romney and Ron Paul each had a non-citizen parent, and therefore should be barred from the November 6, 2012, presidential ballot in Virginia. An amicus brief was filed in support of the Plaintiff by attorney Mario Apuzzo. District Judge John A. Gibney, Jr., dismissed the suit with prejudice because the Plaintiff "does not to state a claim upon which relief may be granted." Judge Gibney explained: "It is well settled that those born in the United States are considered natural born citizens." The dismissal was affirmed without comment by the U.S. Court of Appeals for the Fourth Circuit on June 5, 2012.

==== Sibley v. D.C. Board of Elections and Ethics ====
In June 2012, Sibley filed a lawsuit seeking to compel the District of Columbia's Board of Elections and Ethics to respond to his challenge that Obama is not a natural-born citizen and thus ineligible to stand for the 2012 general election.

==== Daniels v. Ohio Secretary of State ====
In July 2012, Susan Daniels filed a lawsuit seeking to prevent the Ohio Secretary of State from placing Obama's name on the November 2012 ballot due to his alleged use of a fraudulent Social Security number.

==== Epperly v. Obama ====
In July 2012, Gordon Epperly sued the Alaska Division of Elections to force it to obtain Obama's birth certificate before it places him on the ballot.

==== House v. Obama ====
On August 10, 2012, Todd House, a doctor and presidential write-in candidate, filed a lawsuit alleging Obama was born in Kenya and not a natural-born citizen. In dismissing the suit, the court ruled that Congress, and not it, was empowered under the U.S. Constitution to determine the president's eligibility.

==== Begay v. Obama ====
Arnold Begay, a federal prisoner who pleaded guilty (in 2002) to aggravated sexual abuse of a child, filed a lawsuit claiming Obama was not a natural-born citizen and sought a court order demanding Obama to produce a sample of his DNA.

==== Paige v. Condos ====
H. Brooke Paige, who lost the 2012 Vermont primary election for the Republican nomination for the U.S. Senate, sued the Vermont Secretary James Condos seeking to prevent Obama's name from appearing on the ballot. The lawsuit was prepared by Mario Apuzzo (the attorney who filed Kerchner v. Obama), but Paige represented himself in court as Apuzzo was not licensed in Vermont. On September 21, 2012, the court denied Paige's request, ruling it had "been presented with a radically insufficient basis on which to issue a temporary or even a preliminary injunction". On November 14, 2012, the case was dismissed because Paige lacked standing. In October 2013, the Vermont Supreme Court ruled Obama's re-election mooted Paige's appeal, and dismissed the case. Paige sought review in the United States Supreme Court.

==== McInnish v. Bennett ====
In November 2012, the presidential candidate for the Constitution Party and a member of the Alabama Republican party, represented by Larry Klayman, alleged the Alabama Secretary of State had a duty to investigate Obama's eligibility. The trial court dismissed the complaint, and the Alabama Supreme Court affirmed the dismissal. Chief Justice Roy Moore and another justice dissented, arguing the Secretary of State did have the authority to conduct such an investigation. Two other justices wrote concurring opinions that supported the dismissal and addressed the dissenting opinions.

==== Grinols v. Obama ====
On December 13, 2012, Taitz filed in Sacramento, California a lawsuit of behalf of James Grinols (a Republican elector from Minnesota), Robert Odden (a Libertarian elector from Minnesota), Keith Judd (a federal prisoner who was on the West Virginia Democratic primary ballot), Edward Noonan (who won the American Independent Party presidential primary in California), and Thomas MacLeran (who filed to run as a Republican for president) seeking to prevent Congress from certifying the Electoral College's vote. The lawsuit also sought to prevent California officials from certifying the election results from the 2012 presidential election. On January 3, 2013, District Judge Morrison C. England Jr. denied the plaintiffs' request for a temporary restraining order to prevent Congress from certifying the Electoral College's vote. In April 2013, the court dismissed the suit. In November 2015, the 9th Circuit affirmed the district court's dismissal.

== Criminal cases ==
The refusal to accept that Obama was the lawful president led to acts of civil disobedience that were criminally prosecuted.

=== Walter Fitzpatrick III and Darren Huff ===
Walter Fitzpatrick III was unsuccessful in persuading the foreperson of the Monroe County, Tennessee, grand jury to indict Obama for treason because of Obama's purported ineligibility to serve as President. In response, in April 2010, Fitzpatrick accused the foreperson of violating State laws governing the length of time that a foreperson can serve and attempted to make a citizen's arrest. Fitzpatrick and Darren Huff of Georgia, who assisted him, were prosecuted by Tennessee for disrupting a meeting of the grand jury.

Later that month, Huff (who was armed with a Colt .45 and an AK-47), Carl Swensson, and others returned to Tennessee. Huff had told FBI investigators that he intended to assist Fitzpatrick in making citizen's arrests and to have the State charges against Fitzpatrick dropped. According to the FBI, Huff carried a copy of "arrest warrants", signed by Fitzpatrick, that accused two dozen officials as "domestic enemies of the United States engaged in treason". Federal prosecutors charged Huff with transporting a firearm in furtherance of a civil disorder, as well as using a firearm in relation to a violent crime.

Fitzpatrick was convicted in Tennessee of disturbing a meeting and served 60 days in jail; Huff pleaded guilty to the same charge and avoided jail time.

At his October 2011 federal trial, witnesses testified that Huff said he would take over Madisonville, Tennessee, after the Monroe Country grand jury there refused to indict Obama. On October 25, 2011, Huff was convicted of transporting a firearm in furtherance of a civil disorder. Huff was sentenced to four years in prison.

=== Terry Lakin ===
On April 13, 2010, the United States Army announced that it would court-martial Lt. Colonel Terrence Lee Lakin, an osteopathic physician and flight surgeon in the Army Medical Corps, for refusing to report for deployment to Afghanistan. Lakin asserted that Obama was not a U.S. citizen, was not legally the commander-in-chief and, therefore, lacked the authority to send him to Afghanistan. The military revoked Lakin's Pentagon building pass and confiscated his government-issued laptop computer. Lakin was assigned to Walter Reed Army Medical Center while awaiting trial.

Lakin's case differed from Stefan Cook's case in that Cook volunteered to deploy, received orders, and then filed a civil suit refusing to serve; the military responded by revoking Cook's voluntary orders. Lakin was ordered to deploy and he refused to obey the orders, whereupon the military eventually initiated a criminal prosecution under the Uniform Code of Military Justice. On September 2, 2010, Colonel Denise Lind, the presiding judge, issued a ruling in the case that Obama's status as a natural-born citizen is irrelevant in the court-martial case against Lakin, as (1) his orders had come not from Obama himself but rather from senior officers with the independent legal authority to issue them and (2) Obama's eligibility is outside the jurisdiction of the military and falls within the jurisdiction of the United States Congress instead.

Three retired generals publicly expressed support for Lakin. The first was Army Major General (retired) Paul E. Vallely, a senior military analyst for Fox News. In an interview, Vallely stated "I think many in the military, and many out of the military, question the natural-birth status of Barack Obama." Following Vallely's announcement, Army Major General (retired) Jerry Curry and Air Force Lt. General (retired) Thomas G. McInerney also expressed public support for Lakin.

On December 7, 2010, Lakin entered a guilty plea to the charges of disobeying his orders. On December 15, 2010, a military jury convicted him on a charge of missing movement by design. He was sentenced to six months' confinement and dismissed from service. During the sentencing phase of the trial, the prosecution played a video that Lakin had posted online in which he challenged Obama's eligibility. Lakin tearfully responded that the video had been a mistake and that he "would not do this again". On July 28, 2011, the United States Army Court of Criminal Appeals granted Lakin's request to withdraw his case from appellate review.

In February 2012, the Kansas State Board of Healing Arts denied Lakin a license to practice medicine in that state because of his actions. Board members noted that Lakin had jeopardized the health of soldiers in his unit by refusing to deploy. There was also doubt about whether Lakin would obey the law on any health-related legislation signed by Obama.

In January 2017, supporters of Lakin sought on his behalf a pardon from Donald Trump.

=== Theresa Cao ===
On January 6, 2011, the United States Constitution was read on the floor of the House of Representatives. As the section regarding the president's qualifications was being read, Theresa Cao shouted from the gallery, "Except Obama, except Obama. Help us, Jesus." Cao was arrested for disrupting Congress.

== Indictment attempts using "citizen grand juries" ==
Some campaigners, led by Carl Swensson, have sought to "finally expose the conspiracy behind President Obama's birth certificate" by forming what they term "citizen grand juries" to indict Obama. The "grand juries" are based on the Fifth Amendment's premise that "no person shall be held to answer for a capital, or otherwise infamous crime, unless on presentment or indictment of a Grand Jury". Although the activists managed to hand out copies of "indictments" to congressional staff, the courts have not regarded the "citizen grand juries" favorably. In June 2009, a group of 172 campaigners declared themselves to be a "Super American Grand Jury" and voted to charge Obama with treason and accused him of not being a U.S. citizen. Chief Judge Royce C. Lamberth of the United States District Court for the District of Columbia rejected the "indictment" on July 2 and declared: "[T]here is no authority under the Rules of Procedure or in the statutes of the United States for this court to accept [a presentment]... The individuals who have made this presentment were not convened by this court to sit as a grand jury nor have they been selected at random from a fair cross section of this district. Any self-styled indictment or presentment issued by such a group has no force under the Constitution or laws of the United States."

In 2013, a citizen grand jury formed by Larry Klayman "convicted" Obama of fraud.

== See also ==
- Presidential eligibility of Donald Trump
- Barack Obama citizenship conspiracy theories
- United States presidential eligibility legislation
- Natural-born-citizen clause
