= Orly Taitz =

American political conspiracy theorist (born 1960)

- אורלי טייץ
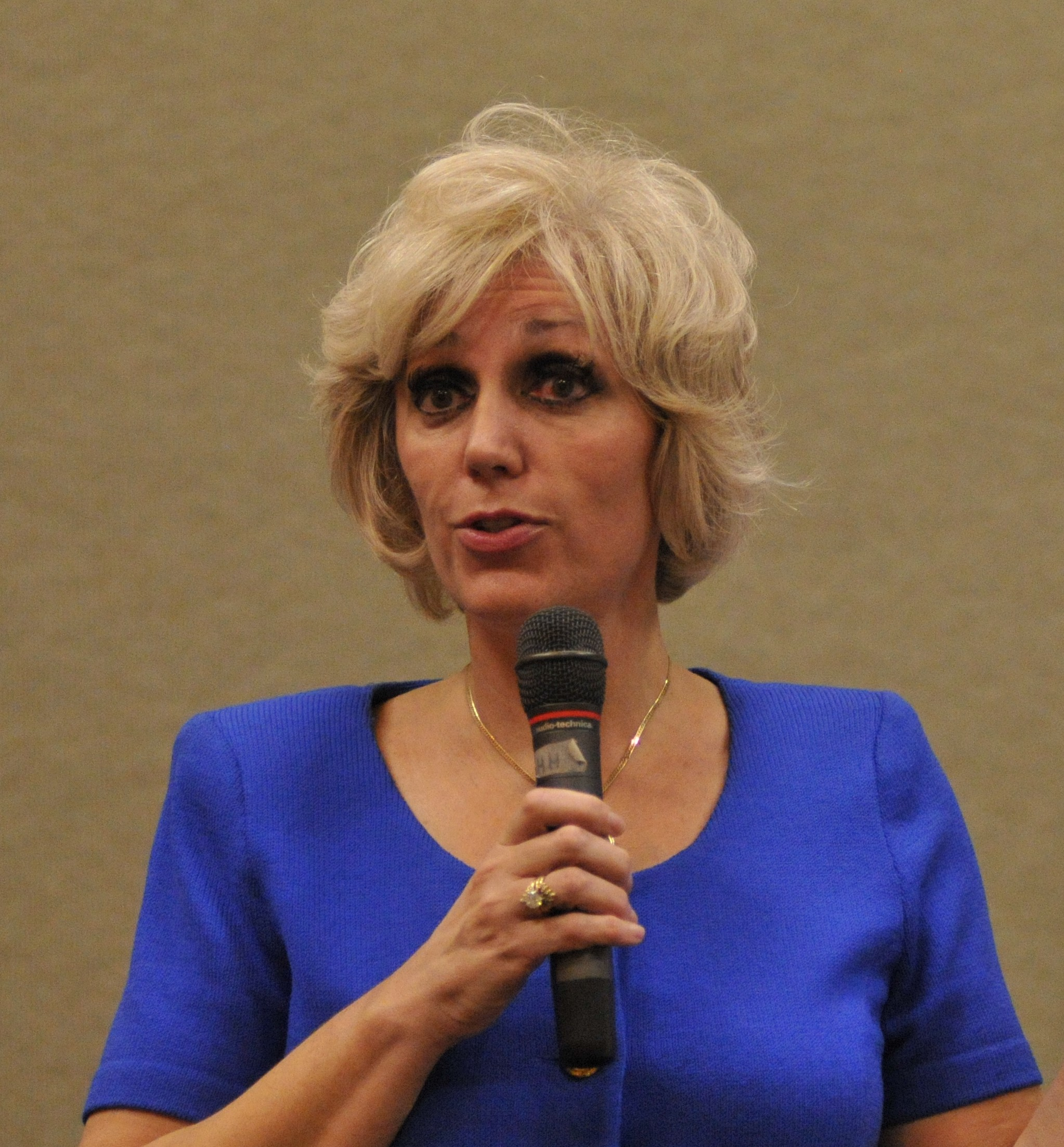
- Taitz in 2008
- Born: August 30, 1960 (age 66); Kishinev, Moldavian SSR, Soviet Union
- Citizenship: American, Israeli
- Education: Hebrew University of Jerusalem; Taft Law School
- Occupations: Dentist, lawyer
- Known for: Filing lawsuits challenging President Obama's eligibility to serve as President of the United States
- Political party: None (previously Republican)
- Spouse: Yosef Taitz
- Children: 3 sons
- Website: www.orlytaitzesq.com

Orly Taitz (Hebrew: אורלי טייץ; born August 30, 1960) is an Israeli-American political conspiracy theorist and political candidate. A dentist, lawyer, and former real estate agent, Taitz was a figure in the "birther" movement, which promoted the conspiracy theory that Barack Obama was not a natural-born citizen eligible to serve as president of the United States. Taitz also promotes other conspiracy theories both related and unrelated to Obama. Taitz has initiated lawsuits on behalf of the "birther" movement; all were dismissed by the courts, and on one occasion Taitz was ordered to pay $20,000 as a sanction for misconduct in filing frivolous claims. Taitz has unsuccessfully run in statewide elections in California three times.

== Early life and immigration ==
Taitz was born to a Jewish family in Kishinev, Moldavian SSR, in the Soviet Union (present-day Moldova). Both of her parents were science teachers. In 1981, Taitz immigrated to Israel, where she obtained a dentistry degree at the Hebrew University of Jerusalem. In 1987, she met Yosef Taitz who proposed four months later. Taitz immigrated to the United States in May 1987, marrying the Latvian-born Yosef in Las Vegas. Taitz became a naturalized United States citizen in 1992. She received her law degree from Taft Law School and was admitted to practice law in California in December 2002.

Taitz lives in Laguna Niguel, California, and owns dental practices in nearby Mission Viejo and Rancho Santa Margarita. She has three sons, holds a second degree black belt in Taekwondo, and speaks five languages: English, Hebrew, Moldovan, Russian, and Spanish.

Before her national news exposure, Taitz was quoted in The Orange County Register in 2006 supporting Israeli military actions against Hamas and Hezbollah, and downplaying the impact of the espionage trial of two American Israel Public Affairs Committee staffers. (Charges against both were subsequently dropped.) Taitz has also said that she lost relatives in the Holocaust and that her grandmother witnessed the Kishinev pogrom.

== Activities ==
=== Taitz's claims regarding President Obama ===
Taitz claimed that U.S. president Obama was not a natural-born citizen of the United States and was therefore ineligible to serve as president. She claimed he was born in Kenya and that he falsified his Selective Service papers and his application to the Illinois bar.

Taitz made other claims against Obama, including:

- That a number of homosexuals from Obama's former church have died mysteriously.
- That Obama had dozens of Social Security numbers, and his passport was inaccurate. Taitz claimed that a person who was cooperating with the FBI in connection with Obama's passport died mysteriously, "shot in the head".
- That a Kenyan birth certificate with the name "Barack Obama" is authentic.
- That Obama's first act as president was to donate money to Hamas, which she claims will be used to build Qassam rockets.
- That Obama, or someone connected to him, has made threats to Taitz's life and vandalized her car.
- The FEMA camps conspiracy theory: Obama is having the Federal Emergency Management Agency build internment camps for "Anti-Obama dissidents".
- That Osama bin Laden was killed years before 2011 when he actually died, with his body kept on ice, and the announcement of his death was timed to divert attention from an upcoming court case she was litigating challenging Obama's citizenship.
- Claims about the Sandy Hook Elementary School shooting conspiracy theories: Taitz blamed Obama for the Sandy Hook Elementary School shooting, writing on her website, "Was Adam Lanza drugged and hypnotised by his handlers to make him into a killing machine as an excuse as the regime is itching to take all means of self defense from the populace before the economic collapse?"

=== Taitz's other claims ===
Taitz has supported other theories not directly related to Obama, including:

- Goldman Sachs runs the United States Treasury.
- Baxter International has developed a bird flu vaccine that kills people.
- Representative Alcee Hastings and the House of Representatives are planning to build at least six labor camps.
- Hugo Chávez owns the software that runs American voting machines.
- FactCheck is untrustworthy because of its links to the Annenberg Foundation.

Taitz has also advocated numerous Internet-related theories, including PayPal attacks, the deletion of her Wikipedia entry, and Google's flagging her webpage as an attack site and suppressing search results for her name.

Taitz has stated that 2016 Republican presidential candidates Ted Cruz, Marco Rubio, and Bobby Jindal were not natural-born citizens and therefore were ineligible for the office they sought.

=== Legal actions ===
==== Challenges to and during Obama's first presidential term ====
===== Keyes v. Bowen =====
In November 2008, Taitz, acting on behalf of independent presidential candidate Alan Keyes, sued California's secretary of state, Debra Bowen, for allegedly failing to ascertain Obama's eligibility for the presidency before placing him on the ballot. The case was dismissed on May 4, 2009. The U.S. Supreme Court declined without comment to review the case on October 3, 2011.

===== Lightfoot v. Bowen =====
Taitz filed an emergency petition in the California Supreme Court in 2008 on behalf of Libertarian vice presidential candidate Gail Lightfoot to stop the certification of California's 2008 election results because of the challenge to Obama's eligibility. The California Supreme Court denied the petition, and the U.S. Supreme Court declined to hear the case.

===== Barnett v. Obama =====
Taitz filed a lawsuit on behalf of Pamela Barnett, Alan Keyes, other candidates in the 2008 federal elections, several military personnel, and some legislators from various states alleging that Obama was ineligible to be president. On October 29, 2009, U.S. District Court Judge David O. Carter dismissed the lawsuit. The dismissal criticized Taitz's legal abilities, stated her behavior was "unethical", and suggested that Taitz "may have suborned perjury". On December 22, 2011, the United States Court of Appeals for the Ninth Circuit affirmed the dismissal. On June 11, 2012, the U.S. Supreme Court declined, without comment, a request by litigants not represented by Taitz to hear the case.

===== Cook v. Good =====
Taitz represented Stefan F. Cook, a major in the United States Army Reserve, who challenged orders implementing his voluntary deployment to Afghanistan because of his claim that Obama was not a legitimate president. The case was dismissed when the Army Reserve revoked his order to deploy. Taitz filed an appeal in the Eleventh Circuit, which was dismissed on November 24, 2009, due to a failure to prosecute the appeal.

===== Rhodes v. MacDonald =====
In September 2009, Taitz was retained by Captain Connie Rhodes, a U.S. Army physician. Rhodes sought a restraining order to prevent her forthcoming deployment to Iraq. In the request for a restraining order, Taitz argued the deployment order was illegal since Obama was illegally serving as president. On September 16, federal judge Clay D. Land rejected the motion and denounced it as frivolous. In his opinion, the judge noted that Rhodes had not previously raised any objections to orders she had received from Obama since he had been sworn in. He noted that while she seemed to have "conscientious objections" to taking orders from Obama, she did not seem to object to serving under him "as long as she is permitted to remain on American soil". Land then upbraided Taitz for using military officers as pawns to further her claims that Obama was not qualified to be president. He also expressed astonishment at Taitz's apparent misunderstanding of American judicial fundamentals, saying that she was trying to make Obama "'prove his innocence' to 'charges' that are based upon conjecture and speculation".

Within hours of Land's decision, Taitz told the news site Talking Points Memo that she felt Land's refusal to hear her case was an act of treason. Two days later, she filed a motion to stay Rhodes' deployment pending rehearing of the dismissal order. She repeated her treason allegations against Land and made several other intemperate statements, including claims that Land was aiding and abetting purported aspirations of "dictatorship" by Obama. Land rejected the motion as frivolous and ordered her to show cause why she should not be fined $10,000 for abuse of judicial process.

A few hours later, a letter bearing Rhodes's signature arrived, stating that Taitz filed the motion without her knowledge or consent, asking Land to remove Taitz as her attorney of record in the case, and stating that it was her "plan to file a complaint with the California State Bar due to [Taitz's] reprehensible and unprofessional actions". On September 26, 2009, Taitz filed a motion with the court seeking to withdraw as counsel for Rhodes, so she could divulge in court "privileged attorney-client communications" since the dismissed Rhodes case "is now a quasi-criminal prosecution of the undersigned attorney, for the purpose of punishment".

====== Attorney misconduct ======
On October 13, 2009, Judge Clay Land ordered "Counsel Orly Taitz ... to pay $20,000 to the United States, through the Middle District of Georgia Clerk's Office, within thirty days of the date of this Order as a sanction for her misconduct in violation of Rule 11 of the Federal Rules of Civil Procedure." Land's decision stated:

The Court finds that counsel's conduct was willful and not merely negligent. It demonstrates bad faith on her part. As an attorney, she is deemed to have known better. She owed a duty to follow the rules and to respect the Court. Counsel's pattern of conduct conclusively establishes that she did not mistakenly violate a provision of law. She knowingly violated Rule 11. Her response to the Court's show cause order is breathtaking in its arrogance and borders on delusional. She expresses no contrition or regret regarding her misconduct. To the contrary, she continues her baseless attacks on the Court.

Upon learning of Land's ruling, Taitz said she would appeal the sanction, declaring that Judge Land was "scared to go against the regime" of the "oppressive" Obama administration, and that the sanction was an attempt to "intimidate" her. On March 15, 2010, the Eleventh Circuit affirmed the sanctions against Taitz, ordering her to pay the $20,000 fine.

In July 2010, Taitz applied to the U.S. Supreme Court to stay the enforcement of sanctions, arguing that "allowing sanctions by judge Land to stand will signify beginning of tyranny in the United States of America and end to the Constitutional Republic which is the foundation of this nation". On July 8, the application was submitted to Associate Justice Clarence Thomas; on July 15, he denied it. Doubting that Justice Thomas signed the denial order, Taitz claimed to have requested of Chief Justice John Roberts that Thomas's signature be presented to her for verification.

In the meantime, on August 9, the federal government filed an abstract of judgment, a document placing a lien in the amount of $20,000 plus interest on all her real property, prompting Taitz to say, "I will pay the money, and I will continue fighting," should it happen that her application for stay is ultimately denied and that the Supreme Court consents to her request to authenticate Justice Thomas's signature. On August 16, after being resubmitted to Associate Justice Samuel Alito, who in turn referred it to the full court, the application for stay was again denied. On January 10, 2011, the Court declined, without comment, to hear the case.

===== Taitz v. Obama =====
On January 27, 2010, Taitz, in propria persona, filed a petition for writ of quo warranto. On April 14, 2010, U.S. District Court Chief Judge Royce C. Lamberth dismissed the petition, stating that "the Court is not willing to go tilting at windmills with her."

===== Taitz v. Astrue =====
In February 2011, Taitz filed, in propria persona, a Freedom of Information Act suit against the commissioner of the Social Security Administration, alleging the agency improperly refused to disclose to her information about Obama's social security number. After Taitz repeatedly failed to follow the court rule regarding the redaction of social security numbers in court filings, Chief Judge Lamberth wrote that Taitz "is either toying with the Court or displaying her own stupidity... There is no logical explanation she can provide as to why she is now wasting the Court's time, as well as the staff's time, with these improper redactions." On August 30, 2011, the court granted summary judgment in favor of the government, writing "As her numerous filings with the Court demonstrate, plaintiff will stop at nothing to get to the bottom of this alleged conspiracy. Unfortunately for plaintiff, today is not her lucky day."

===== Taitz v. Fuddy =====
In August 2011, Taitz filed, in propria persona, a suit against the director of the Hawaii Department of Health, seeking to review Obama's "long form" birth certificate. On October 12, 2011, the Hawaii Circuit Court dismissed Taitz's suit.

===== Taitz v. Ruemmler =====
Taitz sought to compel White House Counsel Kathryn Ruemmler under FOIA to grant access to Obama's "long form" birth certificate. On October 17, 2011, Chief Judge Lamberth noted Taitz's "Sisyphean quest" and dismissed the suit.

==== Challenges to and during Obama's second term ====
===== 2012 New Hampshire primary challenge =====
In November 2011, Taitz, backed by four New Hampshire state legislators, filed a complaint with the state's Ballot Law Commission challenging Obama's eligibility to compete in the primary election. As Obama had paid the filing fee and his declaration of candidacy conformed to state law, the Commission unanimously voted to keep Obama on the ballot. The Commission then denied a request for reconsideration.

In response, Taitz wrote to William L. O'Brien, the Speaker of the House of the New Hampshire House of Representatives, and demanded the removal of Bill Gardner, New Hampshire's Secretary of State, for "egregious elections fraud, aiding and abetting fraud, forgery and possibly treason." D.J. Bettencourt, House Majority Leader of the New Hampshire House of Representatives, wrote to Taitz and called her actions "unbecoming of any legitimate political dialogue, nevermind one as ridiculous as the continued obsession over President Obama's birthplace." Bettencourt added, "I have spoken to the Representatives who were present and expressed to them my strong desire that they immediately disassociate themselves from you and this folly."

===== 2012 Georgia primary challenge =====
Five Georgians, including one represented by Taitz, filed challenges with the Georgia Secretary of State, Brian Kemp, regarding Obama's inclusion on the March primary ballot. Kemp referred the challenges to Deputy Chief Judge Michael Malihi, an administrative law judge, who denied Obama's motion to dismiss them and scheduled a hearing for January 26.

On January 23, Malihi denied Obama's motion to quash a subpoena issued by Taitz to compel Obama to appear, saying that Obama did not show why he should not be at the hearing or how his testimony would not be helpful. On January 25, Obama's attorney requested that Kemp halt the proceedings, and indicated that Obama would no longer participate in the litigation pending Kemp's decision. Kemp denied their request and warned that their non-participation would be "at your own peril".

Neither Obama nor his attorney appeared at the January 26 hearing. This normally would result in a default order, but the challengers requested Malihi to allow them to go ahead with the hearing and rule on "the merits of their arguments and evidence". Taitz called eight witnesses (including herself), and presented seven exhibits in support of her claims that Obama was not a natural-born citizen, has used multiple names, has multiple Social Security numbers, and used a fake birth certificate. Taitz asked Malihi to fine Obama in contempt for failing to appear.

On February 3, Malihi recommended that Obama remain on the ballot. Concerning Taitz's case Malihi wrote: "The Court finds the testimony of the witnesses, as well as the exhibits tendered, to be of little, if any, probative value, and thus wholly insufficient to support plaintiffs’ allegations". The Drudge Retort described the hearing as "Empty Table 1, Orly Taitz 0".

On February 6, Kemp accepted Malihi's recommendation.

On February 13, Taitz filed for review, but on February 15 her application to appear pro hac vice was denied "at this time".

===== 2012 Alabama primary challenge =====
A lawsuit filed by an Alabama citizen, Albert Hendershot, in December 2011 alleged Obama's birth certificate was forged and that he was ineligible to be on the Alabama primary ballot. Taitz agreed to represent Hendershot and sought to enter the case, but it was dismissed before she could make an appearance.

===== 2012 Indiana primary challenge =====
On February 24, Taitz appeared as a witness on the behalf of two residents of Indiana who had filed with the Indiana Election Commission a challenge to Obama's eligibility. The challengers demanded a default judgment against Obama, as neither he nor a representative appeared at the hearing; this motion was unanimously denied by the commission.

Taitz made false claims, arguing that the President's surname was not Obama, that he was not a natural-born citizen, and that he was using a stolen Social Security number. When Taitz accused the commission of a cover-up, Dan Dumezich, the Schererville Republican who is chairman of the commission, told her that if she was disrespectful one more time, "your butt is going to be gone." The challenge was denied.

===== 2012 Mississippi primary challenge =====
In February 2012, Taitz sued the Mississippi state Democratic Party and the Mississippi Secretary of State alleging Obama was not a natural born citizen. Taitz accused the party of aiding and abetting in forgery and fraud when it submitted to the court a copy of Obama's birth certificate. In response, the party filed with the court a certified verification from Hawaii's State Registrar attesting to the accuracy of Obama's birth certificate. Taitz accused the registrar of being complicit with the forgery.

===== 2012 Indiana general election challenge =====
Taitz filed a lawsuit in Indiana, and attempted to subpoena Maricopa County, Arizona Sheriff Joe Arpaio and one of his assistants, Mike Zullo, to compel them to testify about the results of their investigation into Obama's birth certificate. Zullo indicated the two did not intend to attend the trial, stating, "We don't want our information tainted by a circus show".

===== 2012 Kansas general election challenge =====
In September 2012, Taitz attempted to address a Kansas state board that had been reviewing a challenge to Obama's placement on the ballot, but her request to speak was denied. After the hearing was over, Taitz and an Obama supporter argued, and eventually both were escorted out of the building by a police officer. Taitz claimed that during the post-hearing confrontation she was threatened by African-American men behaving like "animals" and "thugs"; two Topeka community leaders who were present labeled Taitz's remarks as "inaccurate" and "racist".

On September 20, Taitz filed a lawsuit in state court seeking to stay the board's actions. On November 2, 2012, the court dismissed Taitz's suit due to her lack of standing.

===== 2012 Mississippi general election challenge =====
In a lawsuit initiated by Taitz, she falsely claimed Obama's birth certificate and Social Security Number were fake, and sought to disqualify him from the ballot.

===== Grinols v. Obama =====
On December 13, 2012, Taitz filed in Sacramento, California a lawsuit on behalf of James Grinols (a Republican elector from Minnesota), Robert Odden (a Libertarian elector from Minnesota), Keith Russell Judd (a federal prisoner who was on the West Virginia Democratic primary ballot), Edward Noonan (who won the American Independent Party presidential primary in California), and Thomas MacLeran (who filed to run as a Republican for president) seeking to prevent Congress from certifying the Electoral College's vote. The lawsuit also sought to prevent California officials from certifying the election results from the 2012 presidential election. On January 3, 2013, District Judge Morrison C. England Jr. denied the plaintiffs' request for a temporary restraining order to prevent Congress from certifying the Electoral College's vote. At the hearing, the judge told Taitz, "Your argument, it doesn't make any sense whatsoever," and at one point asked, "Why do you keep filing these lawsuits when they keep getting rejected?" In April 2013, the court dismissed the suit. In November 2015, the 9th Circuit affirmed the district court's dismissal.

===== Taitz v. Hawaiian Memorial Park Mortuary =====
Believing that the death of Loretta Fuddy (the director of the Hawaii Department of Health) was not an accident, Taitz sued the Hawaiian Memorial Park Mortuary in Federal district court on December 20, 2013, to prevent a cremation. Taitz withdrew her petition on January 9, 2014 and the suit was dismissed the following day.

==== Legal actions not related to Obama's eligibility ====
In 2012, Taitz was retained by a medical marijuana activist who had been arrested while attempting to gather signatures for a ballot initiative.

In 2013, in response to A&E suspending Phil Robertson, Taitz filed an administrative complaint in Colorado that accused A&E was "engaged in discrimination against heterosexuals in favor of homosexuals, engaged in discrimination of religious people, particularly Christians, in favor of godless atheists".

In 2014, in response to the National Basketball Association banning Donald Sterling for making racist remarks, Taitz filed a "complaint" with the NBA, requesting that it also ban Shaquille O'Neal because he, in Taitz's opinion, "publicly bullied" a disabled person.

In 2014, Taitz filed a lawsuit challenging the transfer of undocumented immigrants from South Texas to other states, claiming they would spread communicable diseases. The U.S. government opposed Taitz's lawsuit, arguing she lacked standing and was trying to "entangle the judiciary in her political quarrels." At a hearing held on August 27, 2014, the court denied Taitz's request for a temporary restraining order, but permitted her to amend her lawsuit. In her amended complaint, in addition to her claims about communicable diseases, Taitz claimed that unknown parties pressured a border patrol agent to not testify on her behalf; she also claimed the NSA and FBI have placed agents in the federal courts to tamper with documents. In July 2015, the court dismissed almost of all Taitz's lawsuit, ruling she lacked standing to challenge the federal government's immigration practices.

In 2014, Taitz filed a second lawsuit in Texas, alleging the Centers for Disease Control failed to provide her with information she requested about Ebola and other communicable diseases in the United States. Because the information Taitz sought was not in Texas, the court transferred the case to a court in Southern California, where Taitz resides.

In 2015, Taitz filed a third lawsuit in Texas, alleging the federal government's grant of asylum and refuge status encouraged undocumented immigrants to engage in identity theft. She also alleged Obama was using a stolen Social Security number, forged identification documents, and a false name. Taitz's attempt to join this lawsuit with the first suit that she filed in Texas failed.

In 2020, Taitz expressed interest in joining Donald Trump's legal team for the post-election lawsuits he filed challenging the 2020 U.S. presidential election, but expressed skepticism at the assertion made by the legal team that Trump won by a landslide. In 2021, Taitz unsuccessfully sued Vice President Kamala Harris and Senate Majority Leader Chuck Schumer to stop the second impeachment trial of Donald Trump.

=== Political campaigns ===
==== California Secretary of State, 2010 Republican primary ====
In March 2010, Taitz qualified to run for the office of California Secretary of State. At the same time, she unsuccessfully challenged the eligibility of her Republican Party primary opponent, former NFL player Damon Dunn, claiming that he was pretending to be a Republican. Dunn had registered as a Democrat in the state of Florida in 1999, but that registration had lapsed before he filed for the Republican primary.

On May 12, 2010, Pamela Barnett (named plaintiff from Taitz's lawsuit Barnett v. Obama) filed a lawsuit in the Sacramento County Superior Court alleging that Dunn was not eligible to run for Secretary of State.

Taitz was defeated by Dunn in the June 8 primary by a margin of about three to one, losing by over 900,000 votes.

On June 17, 2010, Taitz filed a lawsuit in the Orange County Superior Court contesting the election results, again alleging Dunn's ineligibility. On March 17, 2011, the judge ruled against Taitz. On May 1, 2012, a California Court of Appeal affirmed the superior court's ruling.

==== U.S. Senator from California, 2012 blanket primary ====
Taitz attempted to challenge U.S. Senator Dianne Feinstein in the 2012 blanket primary, stating, "I think I do have a chance specifically because I do speak Spanish and I speak Hebrew." In November 2011, Taitz trailed Feinstein by a nearly 2–1 margin. A Feinstein advisor stated, "If this race plays out as a bunch of unknowns who have no serious funding, Orly Taitz will probably win the primary [along with Feinstein]." (In 2012, California used a blanket primary campaign system for offices other than U.S. President, so that the top two finishers in the primary regardless of party affiliation go on to the ballot in the fall general election.)

A March 2012 poll by another Republican candidate had Taitz leading the Republican field; 38% of those polled had not decided whom to vote for. On March 11, the California Republican Party endorsed another candidate, Elizabeth Emken, over Taitz. Citing fears the election might be "rigged", Taitz announced her intention to work with Sharron Angle to ensure "a fair and honest election".

On June 5, 2012, Emken came in second to Feinstein in the primary with about 12% of the vote and advanced to the general election; Taitz came in fifth with 3.1%.

In July 2012, Taitz sued to block the certification of the primary election results, alleging "rampant election fraud"; she also alleged Obama engaged in "identity fraud." Her suit was denied.

In October 2012, Taitz tried to revive her election lawsuit by asking the court to compel Occidental College to produce student records for President Obama, who attended Occidental from 1979 to 1981. The judge ruled that Taitz's motion did not meet basic legal requirements and ordered her to pay $4,000 in sanctions to Occidental's lawyer for the cost of opposing the motion. The California Court of Appeal affirmed the dismissal and sanctions.

==== California Attorney General, 2014 blanket primary ====
Taitz filed paperwork indicating her intent to become the Attorney General of California in the 2014 blanket primary. Taitz was endorsed by David Manning. Judson Phillips, leader of the Tea Party Nation, accused Taitz of falsely implying that the organization had endorsed her when it had not.

Taitz came in sixth (out of seven candidates) in the primary, with approximately 3.1% of the vote.

=== Activities in Israel ===
Taitz has also actively promoted her conspiracy theories in Israel, where she falsely claims that "the vast majority" of the population supports her views. She has appeared on the Channel 10 nightly news show London and Kirschenbaum, was the subject of a feature on Channel 1 TV, and filmed a video for the website Arutz 7. Israel's Russian-language media, such as Channel 9 and Vesti, the country's largest Russian-language newspaper, have also covered Taitz.

== In the media ==
Taitz received media attention in connection with Obama's presidential eligibility questions in late 2008. She was interviewed by co-hosts David Shuster and Tamron Hall on MSNBC on August 3, 2009. Various media outlets described her appearance on the network as an "implosion", as Taitz asserted that Shuster, who is Jewish, was a "brownshirt", a charge she repeated in a phone interview the following week.

Fox News commentator Bill O'Reilly called Taitz a "nut". In response, she and pastor James David Manning organized a protest outside Fox News headquarters in New York City in November 2009, which drew an estimated 15 to 20 attendees.

In April 2011, Lawrence O'Donnell invited Taitz on MSNBC so that she could address President Obama's long form birth certificate, which had been released the day before. When Taitz only wanted to make false claims about President Obama's alleged Selective Service papers and refused to comment on his birth certificate, O'Donnell kicked her off the show, stating: "Look, she's crazy. I invited a crazy person on this show to see if the crazy person ... could say something responsive, something human, to the document that was released today ... and she wants to play with all of her other kids' toys."

== See also ==
- Barack Obama religion conspiracy theories
