= Barack Obama citizenship conspiracy theories =

Debunked conspiracy theories

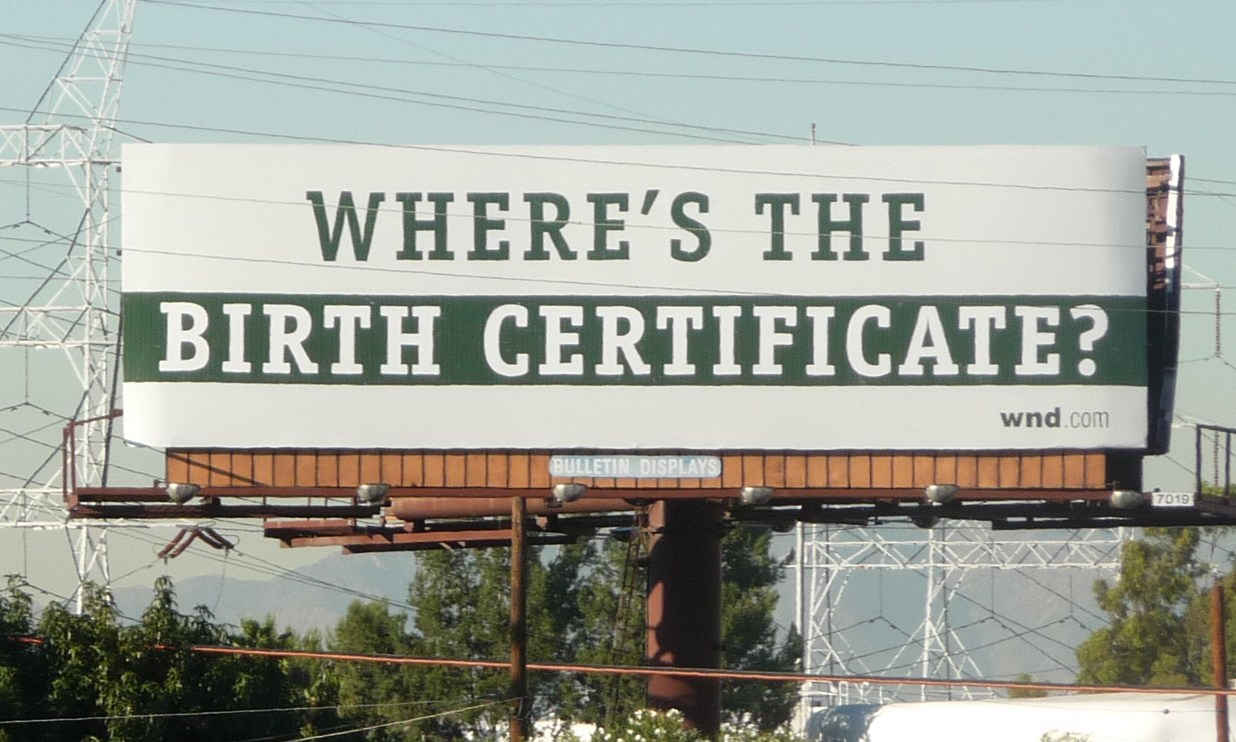
A 2010 billboard displayed in South Gate, California, questioning the validity of Barack Obama's birth certificate and by extension his eligibility to serve as President of the U.S. The billboard was part of an advertising campaign by WorldNetDaily, whose web address appears on the billboard's bottom right corner.

During Barack Obama's campaign for president in 2008, throughout his presidency and afterwards, there was extensive news coverage of Obama's religious preference, birthplace, and of the individuals questioning his religious belief and citizenship – efforts eventually known as the "birther movement", or birtherism, names by which it is widely referred to across media. The movement falsely asserted Obama was ineligible to be President of the United States because he was not a natural-born citizen of the United States as required by Article Two of the Constitution. Studies have found these birther conspiracy theories to be most firmly held by Republicans strong in both political knowledge and racial resentment.

Theories alleged that Obama's published birth certificate was a forgery – that his actual birthplace was not Hawaii, but Kenya. Other theories alleged that Obama became a citizen of Indonesia in childhood, thereby losing his U.S. citizenship. Still others claimed that Obama was not a natural-born U.S. citizen because he was born a dual citizen (British and American). A number of political commentators have characterized these various claims as a racist reaction to Obama's status as the first African-American president of the United States.

These claims were promoted by fringe theorists (pejoratively referred to as "birthers"), including businessman and television personality Donald Trump, who would later succeed Obama as president. Some theorists sought court rulings to declare Obama ineligible to take office, or to grant access to various documents which they claimed would support such ineligibility; none of these efforts succeeded. Some political opponents, especially in the Republican Party, expressed skepticism about Obama's citizenship or were unwilling to acknowledge it; others proposed legislation that would require presidential candidates to provide proof of eligibility.

Theories have persisted despite Obama's pre-election release of his official Hawaiian birth certificate in 2008, confirmation by the Hawaii Department of Health based on the original documents, the April 2011 release of a certified copy of Obama's original Certificate of Live Birth (or long-form birth certificate), and contemporaneous birth announcements published in Hawaii newspapers. Polls conducted in 2010 (before the April 2011 release) suggested that at least 25% of adult Americans said that they doubted Obama's U.S. birth, and a May 2011 Gallup poll found that the percentage had fallen to 13% of American adults (23% of Republicans). The fall was attributed to Obama's release of the long form in April 2011.

== Background ==
=== Early life of Barack Obama ===
People who express doubts about Obama's eligibility or reject details about his early life are often informally called "birthers", a term that parallels the nickname "truthers" for adherents of 9/11 conspiracy theories. These conspiracy theorists reject at least some aspects of his early life:

Barack Obama was born on August 4, 1961, at the Kapiolani Maternity & Gynecological Hospital in Honolulu, Hawaii, to Ann Dunham, from Wichita, Kansas, and her husband Barack Obama Sr., a Luo from Nyang'oma Kogelo, Nyanza Province (in what was then the Colony and Protectorate of Kenya), who was attending the University of Hawaii. Birth notices for Barack Obama were published in The Honolulu Advertiser on August 13 and the Honolulu Star-Bulletin on August 14, 1961. Obama's father's immigration file also clearly states Barack Obama was born in Hawaii. One of his high school teachers, who was acquainted with his mother at the time, remembered hearing about the day of his birth.

Obama's parents were divorced in 1964. He attended kindergarten in 1966–1967 at Noelani Elementary School in Honolulu. In 1967, his mother married Indonesian student Lolo Soetoro, who was also attending the University of Hawaii, and the family moved to Jakarta, Indonesia, where Obama attended the Catholic St. Francis of Assisi School before transferring to State Elementary School Menteng 01, an elite Indonesian public school in Menteng. As a child in Indonesia, Obama was called "Barry Soetoro", reflecting his stepfather's surname, or "Barry Obama", using his father's surname. When he was ten years old, Obama returned to Honolulu to live with his maternal grandparents, Madelyn and Stanley Dunham, and has resided continuously in the United States since 1971.

=== Origins of the claims ===
In 1991, Obama's literary agency, Acton & Dystel, printed a promotional booklet which misidentified Obama's birthplace, and stated that Obama was "born in Kenya and raised in Indonesia and Hawaii". This error was later included in a biography that remained posted to their website until April 2007. The booklet's editor said that this incorrect information, which was not widely discovered until 2012, had been her mistake and not based on anything provided to her agency by Obama.

Conspiracy theories about Obama's religion appeared at least as early as his 2004 U.S. Senate campaign in a press release by Illinois political candidate Andy Martin, and, according to a Los Angeles Times editorial, as internet rumors.

According to Politico, rumors Obama was not born in Hawaii began when Obama's popularity proved a threat to Hillary Clinton. Politico wrote: "That theory first emerged in the spring of 2008..." (There is no evidence that Clinton herself or members of her campaign staff were involved in this effort.) The earliest known appearance of the notion on a conservative blogger website was March 5, 2008, and it was not about his birth, but was about "dual citizenship or split loyalties". In April of that year, some supporters of Hillary Clinton circulated anonymous chain emails repeating the same rumor; among them was an Iowa campaign volunteer, who was fired when the story emerged. These and numerous other chain e-mails during the subsequent presidential election circulated false rumors about Obama's origin, religion, and birth certificate.

On June 9, 2008, Jim Geraghty of the conservative website National Review Online suggested that Obama release his birth certificate. Geraghty wrote that releasing his birth certificate could debunk several false rumors circulating on the Internet, namely: that his middle name was originally Muhammad rather than Hussein; that his mother had originally named him "Barry" rather than "Barack"; and that Barack Obama Sr. was not his biological father, as well as the rumor that Barack Obama was not a natural-born citizen.

In August 2008, Philip J. Berg, a former member of the Democratic State Committee of Pennsylvania, brought an unsuccessful lawsuit against Obama, which alleged "that Obama was born in Mombasa, Kenya."

In October 2008, an NPR article referred to "Kenyan-born" Senator Barack Obama. Also that month, anonymous e-mails circulated claiming that the Associated Press (AP) had reported Obama was "Kenyan-born". The claims were based on an AP story that had appeared five years earlier in a Kenyan publication, The Standard. The rumor-checking website Snopes found that the headline and lead-in sentence describing Obama as born in Kenya and misspelling his first name had been added by the Kenyan newspaper and did not appear in the story issued by the AP or in any other contemporary newspaper that picked up the AP story.

In 2012, the far-right website Breitbart published a copy of the promotional booklet printed by Acton & Dystel in 1991.

== Release of the birth certificates ==
=== Short form, 2008 ===
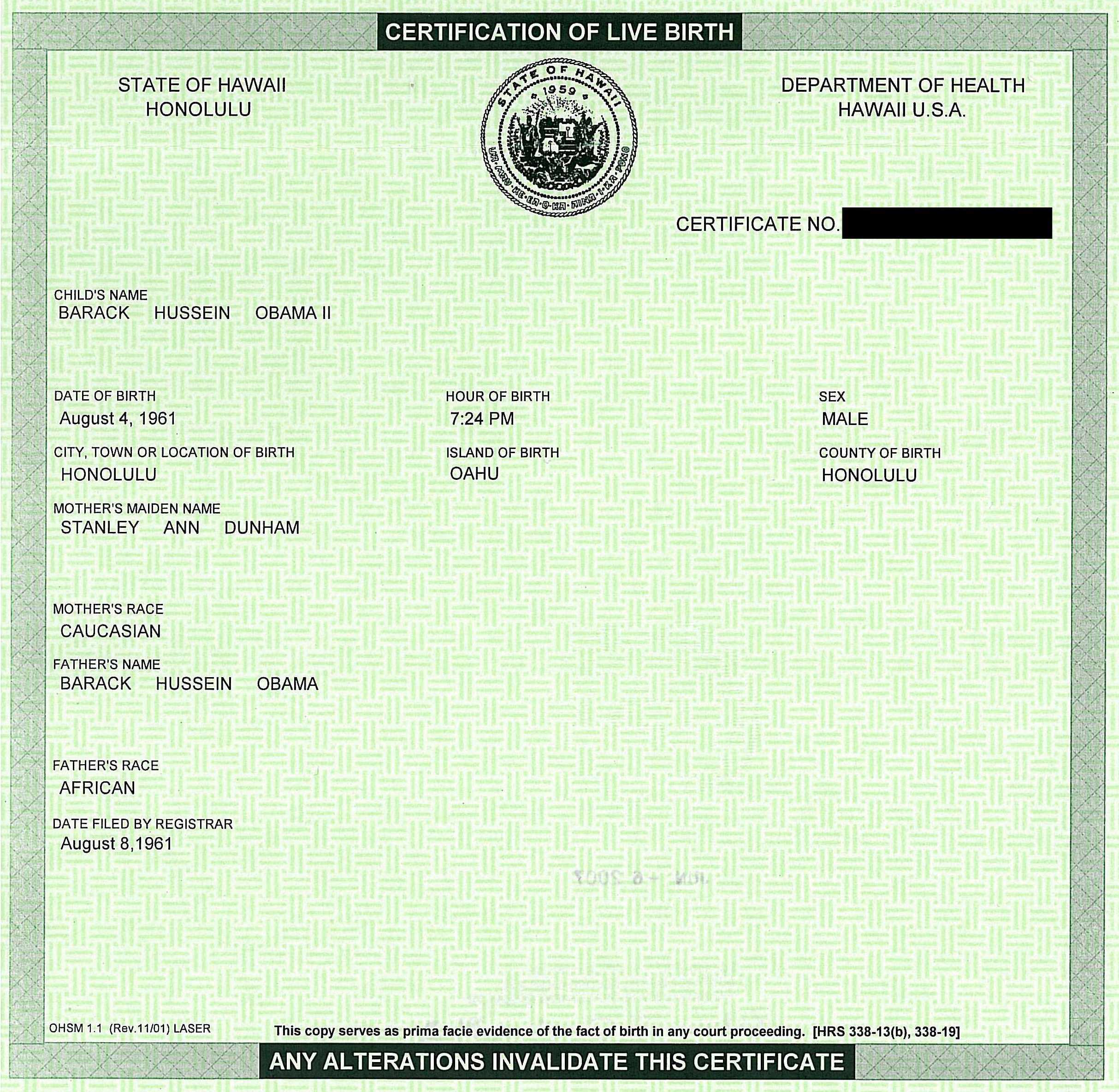
Scanned image of Barack Obama's birth certificate released by his presidential campaign in June 2008

On June 12, 2008, Obama's campaign responded to the rumors by posting an image of Obama's birth certificate on the "Fight the Smears" website.

The image is a scan of a laser-printed document obtained from and certified by the Hawaii Department of Health on June 6, 2007. It is a "Certification of Live Birth", sometimes referred to as a short form birth certificate, and contains less information than the longer "Certificate of Live Birth", which Hawaii no longer issues. Asked about this, Hawaiian Department of Health spokeswoman Janice Okubo explained that Hawaii stopped issuing the longer "Certificate" in 2001 when their birth records were "put into electronic files for consistent reporting", and therefore Hawaii "does not have a short-form or long-form certificate". A "record of live birth", partially handwritten and partially typed, was created and submitted in 1961 when Obama was born, and is "located in a bound volume in a file cabinet on the first floor of the state Department of Health". The document was used to create the state's electronic records, and has been examined by state officials multiple times since the controversy began.

In releasing the certificate, the Obama website declared that the rumors "aren't actually about that piece of paper – they're about manipulating people into thinking Barack is not an American citizen." The campaign also provided the Daily Kos blog with a copy of the document. Referring to this release, National Review columnist Jim Geraghty, wrote on June 12, 2008:

... this document is what he or someone authorized by him was given by the state out of its records. Barring some vast conspiracy within the Hawaii State Department of Health, there is no reason to think his [original] birth certificate would have any different data.

Frequent arguments of those questioning Obama's eligibility related to the fact that he did not originally release a copy of his "original" or "long form" birth certificate, but rather a "short form" version that did not include all of the information given on 1961 Hawaii-issued birth certificates. It was claimed that the use of the term "certification of live birth" on the first document means it is not equivalent to a "birth certificate". These arguments have been debunked numerous times by media investigations, every judicial forum that has addressed the matter, and Hawaiian government officials – among whom a consensus has been reached that the document released by the Obama campaign is indeed his official birth certificate. The director of the state Department of Human Health confirmed that the state "has Senator Obama's original birth certificate on record in accordance with state policies and procedures". The short form is "prima facie evidence of the fact of birth in any court proceeding."

Arizona Tea Party leader and legislator Kelly Townsend pressed legislation to stop Obama from appearing on the ballot in the 2012 election in Arizona without providing proof of birth and also approached Donald Trump with the conspiracy.

==== Rejection by conspiracy theorists ====
The release of the certificate in 2008 resulted in a fresh round of questions. It was asserted that the certificate had been digitally forged with Adobe Photoshop and lacked a stamped seal of the state, which led them to demand that Obama release his "original" 1961 birth certificate. Jerome Corsi, author of the book The Obama Nation: Leftist Politics and the Cult of Personality, told Fox News that "the campaign has a false, fake birth certificate posted on their website ... it's been shown to have watermarks from Photoshop. It's a fake document that's on the Web site right now, and the original birth certificate the campaign refuses to produce." This view was rejected by FactCheck.org, which viewed the Obama campaign's hard copy of the Certification of Live Birth and reported that:

FactCheck.org staffers have now seen, touched, examined and photographed the original birth certificate. We conclude that it meets all of the requirements from the State Department for proving U.S. citizenship. Claims that the document lacks a raised seal or a signature are false. We have posted high-resolution photographs of the document as "supporting documents" to this article. Our conclusion: Obama was born in the U.S.A. just as he has always said.

Corsi continued to cast doubt on Obama's birth certificate as late as March 2019. In a CNN interview, he stated, "I want to see the original 1961 birth records from Kenya, that'll settle it ... the State of Hawaii will not show those records to anyone." Corsi's attorney, Larry Klayman, falsely asserted during the same interview, "the birth certificate uses the word 'African-American' in 1961."

==== Hawaii Department of Health response ====
The director of Hawaii's Department of Health, Chiyome Fukino, issued a statement confirming that the state held Obama's "original birth certificate on record in accordance with state policies and procedures". Noting "there have been numerous requests for Senator Barack Hussein Obama's official birth certificate," Fukino explained that the department was prohibited by state law from releasing it to "persons who do not have a tangible interest in the vital record". She said: "No state official, including Governor Linda Lingle, has ever instructed that this vital record be handled in a manner different from any other vital record in the possession of the State of Hawaii."

According to the website TVNewser, CNN's researchers stated in 2009 that the original birth certificate no longer existed, as Hawaii discarded all paper birth records in 2001, and the certification of live birth was the official copy. Contradicting this report, Janice Okubo, public information officer for the Hawaii DOH, said "We don't destroy vital records." The Health Department's director emphasized the assertion:

I, Dr. Chiyome Fukino, director of the Hawaii State Department of Health, have seen the original vital records maintained on file by the Hawaii State Department of Health verifying Barack Hussein Obama was born in Hawaii and is a natural-born American citizen. I have nothing further to add to this statement or my original statement issued in October 2008, over eight months ago.

Joshua Wisch, a spokesman for the Hawaii Attorney General's office, stated in 2011 that the original "long form" birth certificate – described by Hawaiian officials as a "record of live birth" kept in the archives of the Hawaii Department of Health is "... a Department of Health record and it can't be released to anybody", including President Obama. Wisch added that state law does not authorize photocopying such records.

=== Long form, 2011 ===
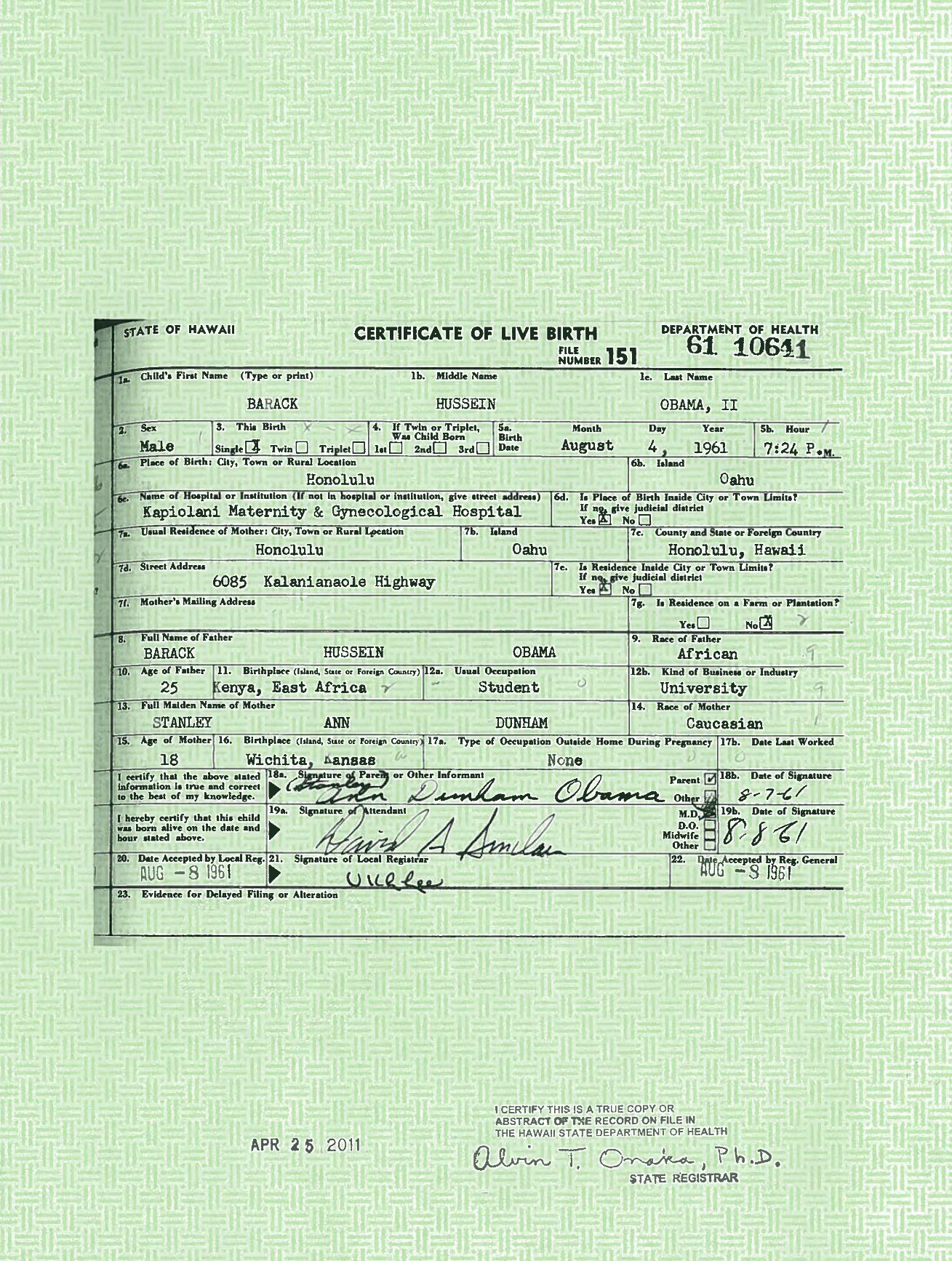
In response to the conspiracy theories, the White House released copies of the President's long-form birth certificate on April 27, 2011, then posted an image of it to the White House website, reaffirming that he was born on August 4, 1961, in Honolulu, Hawaii.

On April 22, 2011, Obama asked Loretta Fuddy, director of the Hawaii Department of Health, for certified copies of his original Certificate of Live Birth ("long-form birth certificate"). Accompanying the letter was a written request from Judith Corley, Obama's personal counsel, requesting a waiver of the department's policy of issuing only computer-generated certificates. Corley stated that granting the waiver would relieve the department of the burden of repeated inquiries into the President's birth records.

On April 25, 2011, Fuddy approved the request and witnessed the copying process as the health department's registrar issued the certified copies. The same day, Corley personally visited the department headquarters in Honolulu to pay the required fee on Obama's behalf, and received the two requested certified copies of the original birth certificate, an accompanying letter from Fuddy attesting to the authenticity of same, and a receipt for the processing fee. Fuddy said that she had granted the exception to its normal policy of issuing only computer-generated copies by virtue of Obama's status, in an effort to avoid ongoing requests for the birth certificate.

On April 27, 2011, White House staffers gave reporters a copy of the certificate, and posted a PDF image of the certificate on the White House website. The certificate reconfirmed the information on the official short-form certificate released in 2008, and provided additional details such as the name of the hospital at which Obama was born.

==== Rejection by conspiracy theorists ====
A claim put forth by the Drudge Report that the newly released document was a forgery made with image editing software quickly spread on the Internet. Nathan Goulding, chief technology officer of the National Review magazine, dismissed the matter of "layered components" found in the White House PDF by suggesting "that whoever scanned the birth certificate in Hawaii forgot to turn off the OCR setting on the scanner." Nathan added, "I've confirmed that scanning an image, converting it to a PDF, optimizing that PDF, and then opening it up in Illustrator, does in fact create layers similar to what is seen in the birth certificate PDF. You can try it yourself at home."

==== "Showing papers" ====
Goldie Taylor, a commentator for the African American news site The Grio, characterized the demand that Obama provide his birth certificate as an equivalent of making him "show his papers", as blacks were once required to do under Jim Crow laws. Sociologist Matthew W. Hughey has cited many of the claims as evidence of racial "othering" of Obama against the conflation of the White Anglo-Saxon Protestant (WASP) subject as the ideal and authentic American citizen.

== False claims ==
=== Born in Kenya ===
Some opponents of Obama's presidential eligibility claim that he was born in Kenya and was therefore not born a United States citizen. Whether Obama having been born outside the U.S. would have invalidated his U.S. citizenship at birth is debated. Political commentator Andrew Malcolm, of the Los Angeles Times, wrote that Obama would still be eligible for the presidency, regardless of where he was born, because his mother was an American citizen, saying that Obama's mother "could have been on Mars when wee Barry emerged and he'd still be American." A contrary view is promoted by UCLA Law Professor Eugene Volokh, who has said that in the hypothetical scenario that Obama was born outside the U.S., he would not be a natural-born citizen, since the then-applicable law would have required Obama's mother to have been in the U.S. at least "five years after the age of 14", but it was three months before Ann Dunham's 19th birthday when Obama was born.

==== Obama's paternal step-grandmother's version of events ====
An incorrect but popularly reported claim is that his father's stepmother, Sarah Obama, told Anabaptist Bishop Ron McRae in a recorded transatlantic telephone conversation that she was present when Obama was born in Kenya.

The McClatchy newspapers gave an explanation of how the story about Obama's step-grandmother began. The tape is cut off in the middle of the conversation, before the passage in which she clarifies her meaning: "'Obama was not born in Mombasa. He was born in America,' the translator says after talking to the woman. ... Another response later says, 'Obama in Hawaii. Hawaii. She says he was born in Hawaii.'"

Sarah Obama shed more light on the controversy in a 2007 interview with the Chicago Tribune, in which she stated that six months after Barack Obama Sr. and Ann Dunham were married, she received a letter at her home in Kenya announcing the birth of Barack Obama II, who was born August 4, 1961.

In a June 2012 interview at her Kenyan home, Sarah Obama was asked: "Some people want to believe that the president was born in Kenya. Have these people ever bothered you or asked for his birth certificate?" Her response was: "But Barack Obama wasn't born in Kenya."

==== Fake Kenyan birth certificate ====
On August 2, 2009, Orly Taitz released and attached to court documents a purported Kenyan birth certificate which she said, if authenticated and shown to be genuine, would significantly narrow and shorten the discovery and pre-trial litigation period in the Keyes v. Bowen lawsuit, in which the plaintiffs asked for a judicial order that Obama provide documentation that he is a natural-born citizen of the United States. Legal papers submitted describe the document as an "unauthenticated color photocopy of certified copy of registration of birth". The document was almost immediately revealed to be a forgery. It purports to have been issued by the "Republic of Kenya", when in fact, such a state did not yet exist at the time of Obama's birth as indicated on the document (Kenya was a British colony until 1963).

Subsequently, evidence was unearthed that the alleged Kenyan birth certificate was a modified version of a 1959 Australian birth certificate found on an online genealogy website. The Washington Independent website cited an anonymous blogger as having taken responsibility for the forgery and posting four photos substantiating his claim.

=== Not born in Hawaii ===
Despite the existence of Obama's Hawaii certification of live birth, Terry Lakin's attorney, among others, have claimed that anyone, including foreign-born children, could acquire a Hawaiian certification of live birth, and so Obama's possession of such a certificate does not prove that he was born in Hawaii. However, the suggestion that this could have applied to Obama was rejected by Janice Okubo, director of communications for the Hawaii Department of Health: "If you were born in Bali, for example, you could get a certificate from the state of Hawaii saying you were born in Bali. You could not get a certificate saying you were born in Honolulu. The state has to verify a fact like that for it to appear on the certificate." Another fact that refutes this specific claim is that the law allowing foreign-born children to obtain Hawaiian birth certificates did not exist until 20 years after Obama was born, while Obama's published birth certificate says his birth information was recorded four days after his birth in 1961, and explicitly states that he was born in Honolulu.

Additionally, some people claim that the information in the birth certificate only has to be based on the testimony of one parent.

On July 27, 2009, Fukino issued a statement explicitly stating she has "seen the original vital records maintained on file by the Hawaii State Department of Health verifying Barack Hussein Obama was born in Hawaii and is a natural-born American citizen".

Hawaiian Department of Health spokeswoman Janice Okubo elaborated on state policy for the release of vital records: "If someone from Obama's campaign gave us permission in person and presented some kind of verification that he or she was Obama's designee, we could release the vital record."

A hospital spokesperson at Kapi'olani Medical Center for Women & Children has said that their standard procedure is to neither confirm nor deny Obama was born there, "even though all the information out there says he was born at Kapiolani Hospital", citing federal privacy laws.

Obama's birth announcement, published in The Honolulu Advertiser on August 13, 1961

In 1961, birth notices for Barack Obama were published in both the Honolulu Advertiser and the Honolulu Star-Bulletin on August 13 and 14, 1961, respectively, listing the home address of Obama's parents as 6085 Kalanianaole Highway in Honolulu. On November 9, 2008, in response to the persistent rumors, the Advertiser posted on its web site a screenshot of the announcement taken from its microfilmed archives. Such notices were sent to newspapers routinely by the Hawaii Department of Health.

In an editorial published on July 29, 2009, the Star-Bulletin pointed out that both newspapers' vital-statistics columns are available on microfilm in the main state library. "Were the state Department of Health and Obama's parents really in cahoots to give false information to the newspapers [...]?" the newspaper asked.

=== Lost U.S. citizenship ===
It has been suggested that Obama obtained Indonesian citizenship (and thus may have lost U.S. citizenship) when he lived there as a child. As an attempt to prove that Obama was no longer a U.S. citizen (or held dual citizenship), some claim his 1981 trip to Pakistan took place at a time when there was supposedly a ban on United States passport holders entering that country, which would in turn have required him to use a non-U.S. passport. There was in fact no such ban. A New York Times article and U.S. State Department travel advisories from 1981 make it clear that travel to Pakistan by U.S. passport holders was legal at that time.

An April Fools' Day hoax email circulated on the Internet starting in 2009. It falsely claimed that Obama applied to Occidental College under the name "Barry Soetoro" claiming to be "a foreign student from Indonesia" in order to obtain a Fulbright scholarship (which does not exist for undergraduate students from Indonesia).

== Disputes over "natural-born citizen" requirements ==
Another theory of Obama's ineligibility is that, regardless of his place of birth, he does not meet the constitutional definition of a natural-born citizen.

The Fourteenth Amendment to the United States Constitution states: "All persons born or naturalized in the United States, and subject to the jurisdiction thereof, are citizens of the United States ..." According to law professor Gabriel J. Chin, "there is agreement that 'natural born citizens' include those made citizens by birth under the 14th Amendment."

Despite this agreement, two similar but distinct theories nonetheless contend Obama, although born in Hawaii, does not qualify as a "natural-born citizen".

=== Parental citizenship ===
Some campaigners, such as the Tennessee-based Liberty Legal Foundation, contend that in order for a person to be a natural-born citizen within the meaning of Article II, Section 1, it is necessary that both parents be U.S. citizens at the time of that person's birth. Those who subscribe to this theory argue that since Obama's father was not a U.S. citizen, Obama could not have been a natural-born citizen, and is therefore ineligible to be President of the United States. The Liberty Legal Foundation has cited a passage in the decision on an 1875 voting rights case which came before the U.S. Supreme Court – Minor v. Happersett – in which the court stated there was no doubt that "all children born in a country of parents who were its citizens" were natural-born citizens. This legal theory on Obama's eligibility was unsuccessfully litigated several times, most notably in Ankeny v. Governor of the State of Indiana (2008).

=== Dual citizenship with United Kingdom ===
Others, including New Jersey attorney Leo Donofrio, in Donofrio v. Wells, have claimed that a person cannot be a natural-born citizen if he is a dual citizen at birth. Donofrio argued that because Obama's father was a British subject at the time Obama was born, Obama was born a dual citizen and therefore was not a natural-born citizen. On December 8, 2008, the Court declined without comment to hear the case.

=== Dual citizenship with Kenya ===
In August 2008, the Rocky Mountain News ran an online article asserting that Obama was a U.S.-Kenyan dual citizen. Obama actually was born a citizen of the United Kingdom and Colonies (CUKC) under British law by virtue of having a Kenyan father at a time when Kenya was a British colony, though he lost his CUKC citizenship and became a Kenyan citizen when Kenya became independent in 1963. However, Kenya's 1963 constitution prohibited dual citizenship among adults; Obama therefore automatically lost his Kenyan citizenship on his 23rd birthday in 1984, by failing to formally renounce any non-Kenyan citizenship and swear an oath of allegiance to Kenya. The Rocky Mountain News apologized for the error and published a correction, but the article continued to fuel online rumors about Obama's eligibility for the presidency. The current Kenyan constitution, effective since 2010, permits dual citizenship, but requires those who lost Kenyan citizenship prior to 2010 to complete a registration process to regain it.

== Campaigners and proponents ==
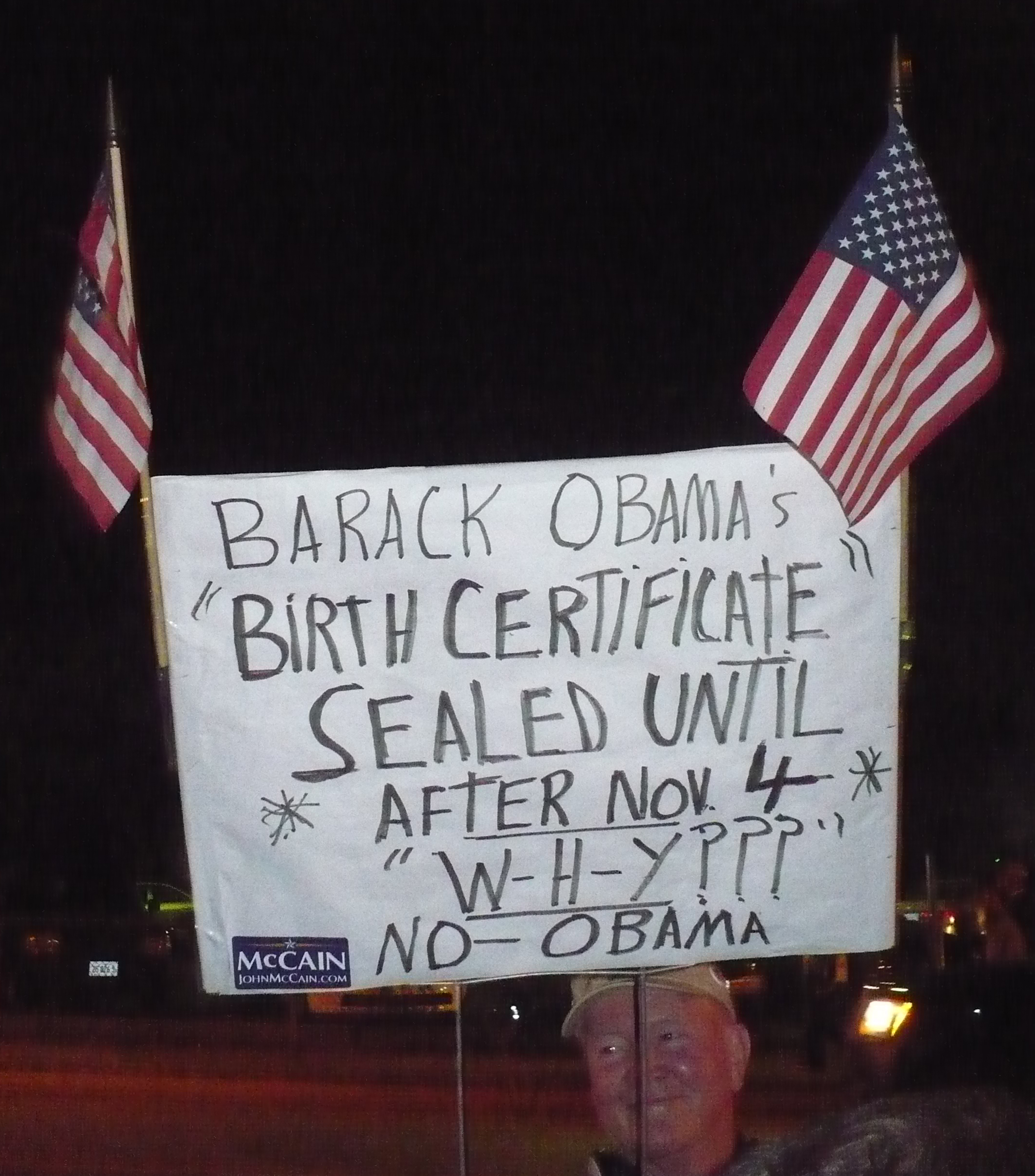
A protester questioning the legitimacy of Obama's birth certificate

Notable advocates of the view that Obama may not be eligible for the Presidency include Philip J. Berg, a Pennsylvania attorney and 9/11 conspiracy theorist. Berg describes himself as a "moderate to liberal" Democrat who backed Hillary Clinton for president. Another notable advocate is Alan Keyes, who was defeated by Obama in the 2004 Illinois U.S. Senate election, served as a diplomat in the Reagan administration, and is currently a media personality and self-described "conservative political activist". Orly Taitz, a California dentist and attorney who emigrated from the Soviet Union to Israel, then to the United States, and holds dual U.S. and Israeli citizenship, has been called the "queen bee of the birthers", because she is often seen as the face of the movement.

Other notable advocates include Andy Martin, a perennial candidate who was "widely credited with starting the cyberwhisper campaign" that Obama is a secret Muslim, and Robert L. Schulz, a tax protester and activist who placed full-page advertisements in the Chicago Tribune in December 2008 arguing that Obama had been born in Kenya or had subsequently renounced U.S. citizenship. Larry Klayman, founder of both Judicial Watch and Freedom Watch, expressed doubts about Obama's natural-born citizenship. The Constitution Party, a paleoconservative third party, also campaigned for release of Obama's original long-form certificate. In December 2008, Alex Koppelman, a senior writer for Salon, characterized nearly all of the prominent people promoting the story Obama was not eligible to be president – including Jerome Corsi, Philip Berg, Andy Martin, and Robert Schultz – as having a "history of conspiracist thought".

The website AmericaMustKnow.com encouraged visitors to lobby members of the Electoral College to vote against Obama's confirmation as President and become faithless electors. Electors around the country received numerous letters and e-mails contending that Obama's birth certificate is a forgery and that he was born in Kenya, and requesting that Obama be denied the presidency. Some of the online campaigners coordinated their efforts with weekly conference calls, in which they discussed the latest news and how to advance the story.

The campaign was supported by the far-right WorldNetDaily (WND) website, which sponsored a letter-writing campaign to the Supreme Court. The website's founder, Joseph Farah, offered a $15,000 award for the release of the certificate and has written a number of editorials arguing that Obama's eligibility needs to be confirmed. WND also mounted an advertising campaign, using electronic billboards to ask, "Where's The Birth Certificate?" Farah declined to pay the promised award upon the release of the certificate and alleged that it was "fraudulent".

The talk radio hosts Michael Savage, G. Gordon Liddy, Brian Sussman, Lars Larson, Bob Grant, Jim Quinn, Rose Tennent, Barbara Simpson, Mark Davis, and Fred Grandy have all promoted the ineligibility claims on their radio shows. Rush Limbaugh, Sean Hannity and Lou Dobbs have also broached the issue several times on their shows. Savage, during an episode of his nationally syndicated radio show The Savage Nation, said that "We're getting ready for the Communist takeover of America with a noncitizen at the helm."

Some celebrities have promoted or touched upon the ineligibility claims. In August 2009, actor Chuck Norris, while not embracing the eligibility claims, wrote an open letter to Obama urging that he officially release his "original birth certificate", saying, "Refusing to post your original birth certificate is an unwise political and leadership decision that is enabling the 'birther' controversy." In December 2010, Baltimore Orioles baseball player Luke Scott asserted in a Yahoo! interview that Obama "was not born here" and that his birth certificate was never released. The Huffington Post reported that, in April 2011 during his stage show, Charlie Sheen said, "For starters, I was fucking born here, how about that? And I got proof! Nothing photoshopped about my birth certificate."

According to Mark Potok of the Southern Poverty Law Center, "the birther movement has gained a large following on the radical right ... it has been adopted by the most noxious elements out there." Some of those "noxious elements" include a number of avowed white supremacist and neo-Nazi groups. James Wenneker von Brunn, an avowed white supremacist charged as the gunman in the June 10, 2009, United States Holocaust Memorial Museum shooting, had previously posted messages to the Internet accusing Obama and the media of hiding documents about his life.

In March 2017, after Obama was no longer the president, Malik Obama, his paternal half brother, posted on Twitter an image of a fake Kenyan birth certificate, which had been debunked in 2009 when it was first presented as part of one of the failed lawsuits that challenged Obama's ineligibility.

=== Donald Trump ===
Donald Trump was a prominent promoter of birther conspiracy theories. This elevated Trump's political profile in the years leading up to his successful 2016 presidential campaign. According to political scientists John M. Sides, Michael Tesler, and Lynn Vavreck, Trump "became a virtual spokesperson for the 'birther' movement. When Trump suggested running for president in 2011, his popularity was concentrated among the sizable share of Republicans who thought that President Obama was foreign born or a Muslim or both."

In 2010, at the urging of Donald Trump's lawyer Michael Cohen, the National Enquirer began promoting a potential Trump presidential campaign, and with Cohen's involvement, the tabloid began questioning Obama's birthplace and citizenship.

In March 2011, during an interview on Good Morning America, Donald Trump said he was seriously considering running for president, that he was a "little" skeptical of Obama's citizenship, and that someone who shares this view should not be so quickly dismissed as an "idiot" (as Trump considers the term "birther" to be "derogatory"). Trump added, "Growing up no one knew him," a claim ranked Pants-on-Fire by PolitiFact. Later, Trump appeared on The View repeating several times that "I want him [Obama] to show his birth certificate." He speculated that "there [was] something on that birth certificate that [Obama] doesn't like", a comment which host Whoopi Goldberg described as "the biggest pile of dog mess I've heard in ages". On the March 30, 2011, edition of CNN Newsroom, anchor Suzanne Malveaux commented on Trump's statements, pointing out that she had made a documentary for which she had gone to Hawaii and spoken with people who knew Obama as a child. In an NBC TV interview broadcast on April 7, 2011, Trump said he would not let go of the issue, because he was not satisfied that Obama had proved his citizenship. After Trump began making his views public, he was contacted by Joseph Farah of WorldNetDaily, who was reportedly on the phone with Trump every day for a week, providing Trump with a "birther primer", answers to questions, and advice. After Obama released his long-form birth certificate on April 27, 2011, Trump said "I am really honored and I am really proud, that I was able to do something that nobody else could do."

On October 24, 2012, Trump offered to donate five million dollars to the charity of Obama's choice in return for the publication of his college and passport applications before October 31, 2012.

On September 16, 2016, as the Republican Party presidential nominee, Trump conceded that "President Barack Obama was born in the United States. Period." Trump gave himself credit for putting the controversy to rest and also repeated a false claim that Hillary Clinton, his opponent in the 2016 U.S. presidential election and one of Obama's opponents in the 2008 Democratic presidential primaries, had started the controversy concerning Obama's place of birth in order to harm the candidacy of Obama while boosting her own. While some Clinton supporters supported the theory, there is no evidence of Clinton or her campaign questioning Obama's birthplace.

=== Joe Arpaio ===
Volunteer investigators working under the direction of Maricopa County, Arizona, Sheriff Joe Arpaio have asserted that Obama's birth certificate is a computer-generated forgery. Rejecting this claim, an assistant to Hawaii's attorney general stated in July 2012 that "President Obama was born in Honolulu, and his birth certificate is valid. ... Regarding the latest allegations from a sheriff in Arizona, they are untrue, misinformed and misconstrue Hawaii law." Arizona state officials, including Governor Jan Brewer and Secretary of State Ken Bennett, have also dismissed Arpaio's objections and accepted the validity of Obama's birth certificate. Alex Pareene, a staff writer for Salon, wrote regarding a May 2012 trip to Hawaii by Arpaio's people that "I think we have long since passed the point at which I'd find this story believable in a fictional setting." In December 2016, Arpaio presented "9 points of forgery" that he said proved that the digital image of Obama's long form birth certificate was not authentic. He said he would submit his evidence to federal authorities.

=== Matthew Hill ===
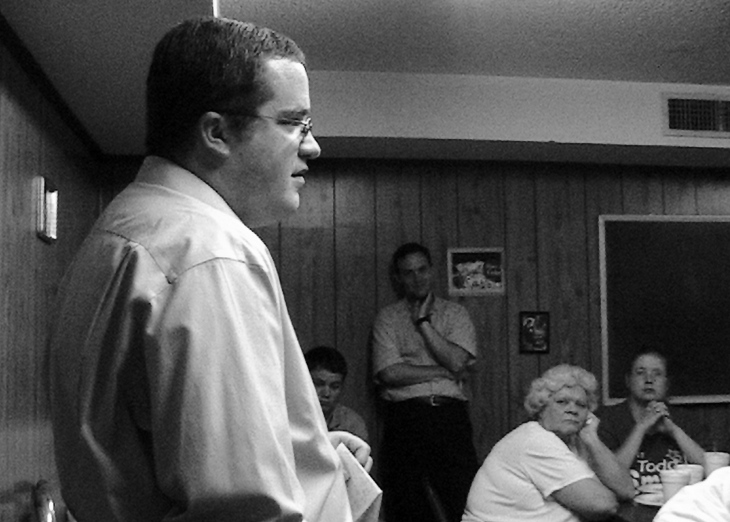
TNGA Rep. Matthew Hill speaking during 2008 Republican primary debate, Jonesborough, Tennessee

Rep. Matthew Hill, one of a handful of Tennessee General Assembly members widely reported at the time to be birthers, demanded in 2009 that newly-elected president Obama should be compelled to present Hill and other Tennessee state legislators with a certified copy of his Hawaiian birth certificate.

Hill interviewed birther conspiracy advocate Orly Taitz at the National Religious Broadcasters Convention in Nashville for a February 10, 2009, segment podcasted online by the IRN/USA Radio Network. During The Matthew Hill Show he stated:

We've said on this program many times ... we've had people call in and say why are you picking on him? And I've said, "Look it's really simple. If he is a U.S. citizen you produce the papers. If he's not a U.S. citizen, what does he do? He hides them. He's hiding them. We need the truth. We need the documents unsealed. We need to know what's going on.

=== Roy Moore ===
U.S. Senate candidate and former Chief Justice of the Alabama Supreme Court Roy Moore first questioned Obama's citizenship in 2008, and said in 2016 that he didn't believe Obama had natural-born citizenship.

=== Richard Shelby ===
In February 2009, the Cullman Times, an Alabama newspaper, reported that at a town hall meeting there, U.S. Senator from Alabama Richard Shelby was asked if there was any truth to the rumors that Obama was not a natural-born citizen. According to the Times report, Shelby said, "Well his father was Kenyan and they said he was born in Hawaii, but I haven't seen any birth certificate. You have to be born in America to be president."

A Shelby spokesperson denied the story, but the newspaper stood by it.

=== Roy Blunt ===
On July 28, 2009, Mike Stark approached Missouri Congressman Roy Blunt asking him about the conspiracy theory that Barack Obama is not a natural-born citizen. Blunt responded: "What I don't know is why the President can't produce a birth certificate. I don't know anybody else that can't produce one. And I think that's a legitimate question. No health records, no birth certificate." Blunt's spokesperson later claimed that the quote was taken out of context.

=== Jean Schmidt ===
After giving a speech at the Voice of America Freedom Rally in West Chester, Ohio on September 5, 2009, Republican congresswoman Jean Schmidt replied to a woman who commented that Obama was ineligible for the Presidency, "I agree with you. But the courts don't." Schmidt's office subsequently responded that a video clip of this comment was "taken out of context", and reiterated that her stated position is that Obama is a citizen.

She had earlier voted to certify the Electoral College vote affirming his presidency, and had said she believes Obama is a U.S. citizen.

=== Nathan Deal ===
In November 2009, then-Representative Nathan Deal replied to a question about whether he believed that Obama "is a native-born American citizen who is eligible to serve as president" with a statement that "I am joining several of my colleagues in the House in writing a letter to the President asking that he release a copy of his birth certificate so we can have an answer to this question." Contrasting the differing fates of Deal, who won the 2010 gubernatorial election in Georgia, and former Democratic Representative Cynthia McKinney, who lost her primary after endorsing 9/11 conspiracy theories, David Weigel of Slate noted: "Dipping a toe into the birtherism fever swamp didn't stop Deal from winning a statewide primary."

=== Sarah Palin ===
During a December 3, 2009 interview on Rusty Humphries' radio talk show, Humphries asked Sarah Palin if she would make Obama's birth certificate a campaign issue in 2012, should she decide to run. Palin responded, "I think the public rightfully is still making it an issue. I don't have a problem with that. I don't know if I would have to bother to make it an issue, because I think that members of the electorate still want answers ... I think it's a fair question, just like I think past association and past voting records – all of that is fair game. The McCain-Palin campaign didn't do a good enough job in that area."

After news organizations and blogs picked up the quotation, Palin stated on her Facebook page that voters have the right to ask questions, and that she had herself never asked Obama to produce a birth certificate. She likened the questioning of Obama's birth certificate to questions raised during the 2008 presidential elections about her maternity to her son, Trig. This analogy was criticized by Mark Milian of the Los Angeles Times, who said: "It's not like Barack Obama hosted a radio show and called her a baby faker."

=== Tracey Mann ===
Tracey Mann, a candidate running for Congress from Kansas in 2010, stated at a candidate forum that Obama should release his birth certificate to resolve the issue. In a radio interview, he said: "I think the president of the United States needs to come forth with his papers and show everyone that he's an American citizen and put this issue to bed once and for all." In response, on July 21, 2010, The Hutchinson News, a local paper in Hutchinson, Kansas, withdrew their endorsement of Mann, saying that Mann "questions the citizenship of President Barack Obama despite evidence that is irrefutable to most objective, rational people – including a birth certificate released by the Hawaii secretary of state and birth announcements printed in Honolulu's two major newspapers". Mann responded that he was "disappointed and mystified" by the decision and that they had misunderstood his position, as he was "not interested in pursuing this issue in Congress" and had "never had any interest in spending any time on the matter". Mann was defeated in the Republican primary by state senator Tim Huelskamp.

=== David Vitter ===
At a townhall meeting in Metairie, Louisiana on July 11, 2010, Senator David Vitter said: "I personally don't have standing to bring litigation in court, but I support conservative legal organizations and others who would bring that to court. I think that is the valid and most possibly effective grounds to do it." His campaign provided no additional comments.

=== Newt Gingrich ===
On September 11, 2010, former Speaker of the House Newt Gingrich stated that Obama could only be understood by people who "understand Kenyan, anti-colonial behavior". While Gingrich did not define this behavior, White House Press Secretary Robert Gibbs accused Gingrich of "trying to appeal to the fringe of people who don't believe the president was born in this country ... You would normally expect better of somebody who held the position of Speaker of the House, but look, it is political season, and most people will say anything, and Newt Gingrich does that on a, genuinely, on a regular basis."

=== Andy Martin ===
In December 2010, Andy Martin (plaintiff in Martin v. Lingle and self-described "King of the Birthers") announced his candidacy to seek the 2012 Republican nomination for the President of the United States. In February 2011, Martin's planned appearance at a Republican meeting in Deering, New Hampshire, was cancelled after his anti-Semitic past was discovered.

=== Mike Huckabee ===
On February 28, 2011, on Steve Malzberg's radio program Mike Huckabee, a 2008 candidate for the Republican presidential nomination, falsely claimed that Obama had been raised in Kenya and that "[Obama] probably grew up hearing that the British were a bunch of imperialists who persecuted his grandfather." Huckabee, speaking on The O'Reilly Factor, said that he misspoke and intended to say Indonesia, characterizing his comment as a "verbal gaffe".

=== Michele Bachmann ===
In March 2011, Representative Michele Bachmann told conservative radio host Jeff Katz: "I'll tell you one thing, if I was ever to run for president of the United States, I think the first thing I would do in the first debate is offer my birth certificate, so we can get that off the table." Previously on Good Morning America, when asked about Obama's origins, she replied, "Well, that isn't for me to state. That's for the president to state."

=== Mike Coffman ===
On May 12, 2012, Mike Coffman, a congressman running for re-election in the Sixth Congressional District of Colorado, addressed a Republican fundraising event in Elbert County. Coffman stated that he did not know where Obama was born, and that Obama was "in his heart ... just not an American." Coffman issued an apology on May 16, saying that he had misspoken and that he had confidence in Obama's citizenship and legitimacy as president. In a May 23 Denver Post op-ed piece, Coffman described his comment as "inappropriate and boneheaded".

=== Arizona electors ===
In December 2012, three of the eleven electors from Arizona who cast their votes for Mitt Romney raised doubts about Obama's birthplace. One was the chair of the Republican Party of Arizona, Tom Morrissey. Morrissey later insisted that he was not a birther, but said he was not convinced the birth certificate produced by Obama was real.

== Political impact ==
Here is what the Republican party needs to do: we have to say that's crazy. So I'm here to tell you that those who think the president was born somewhere other than Hawaii you're crazy ... let's knock this crap off and talk about the real differences we have.

— Republican U.S. Senator Lindsey Graham, October 1, 2009

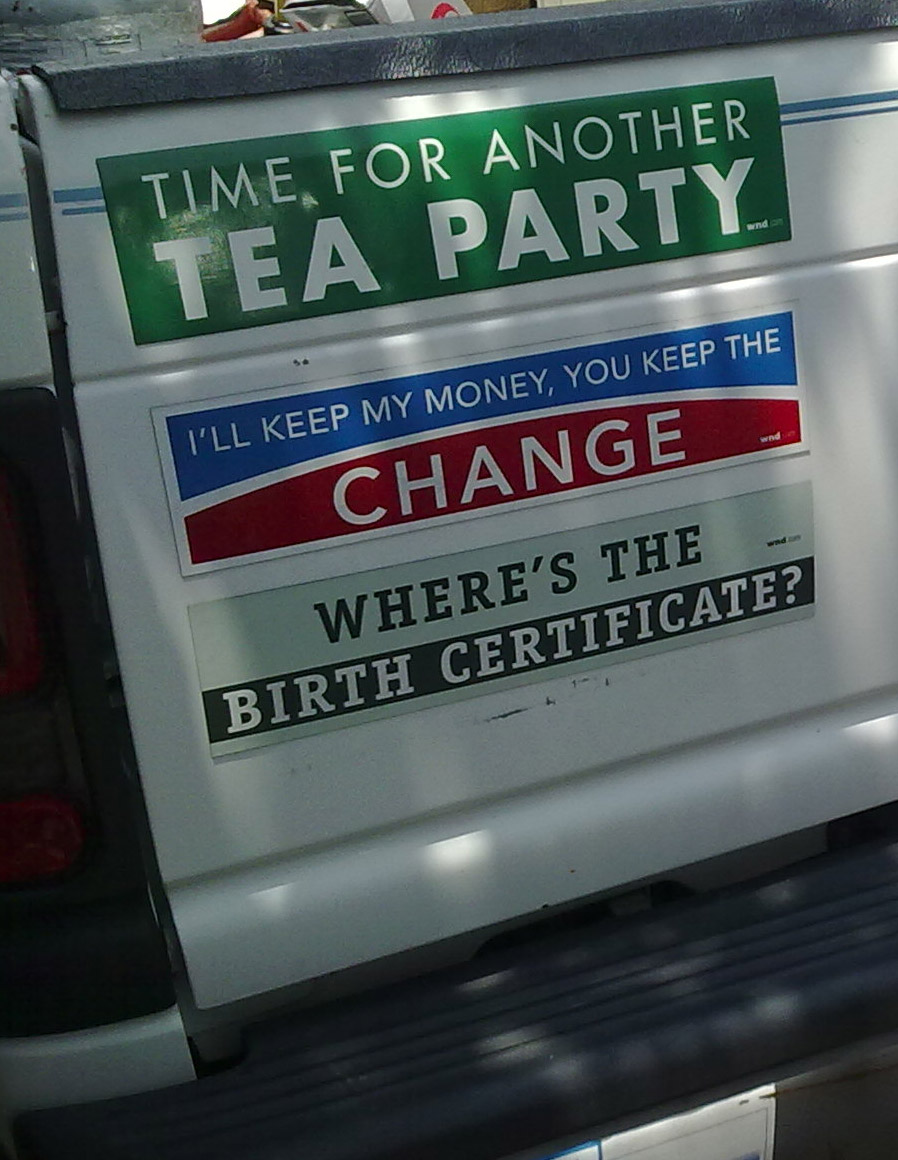
A birth certificate-related bumper sticker, below two other stickers

Although claims about Obama's citizenship were evaluated in 2008 by the McCain campaign and ultimately rejected, they became a significant issue among sections of the political right. Activists unsuccessfully lobbied Republican members of Congress to reject the 2008 Electoral College vote and block Obama's election when it came before Congress for certification on January 8, 2009. By mid-2009, the natural born citizen issue was one of the hottest and most lucrative sources of fundraising for organizations on the right that raise funds through direct mail and telemarketing. Online petition sites such as that of Alan Keyes, who has been collecting signatures on the birth certificate issue, are a major source for generating mailing lists of movement conservatives. The web site WorldNetDaily published more than 200 articles on the subject by July 2009 and has sold billboards, bumper stickers and postcards asking "Where's the birth certificate?" and similar slogans in an effort which has "already raised tens of thousands of dollars".

Moderate conservatives soon found themselves "bombarded with birther stuff". Protesters at the Tea Party protests in 2009 carried signs about the birth certificate issue, some of which were recommended by protest organizers. In an incident that attracted widespread media coverage, moderate Republican Representative Michael Castle was booed and heckled during a July 2009 town hall meeting in Georgetown, Delaware, when he told a woman protesting about Obama's birth certificate: "if you're referring to the president there, he is a citizen of the United States."

NBC Nightly News reported that other members of Congress often hear the issue too; an anonymous congressman told the program that he was reluctant to advertise his own town hall meetings for fear of this issue drowning out everything else.

A number of Republican legislators have proposed legislation and constitutional amendments at the state and federal levels to address issues raised by the birth certificate campaigners. Some Republicans are said to "want the issue to go away", seeing it as a distraction. Democratic commentators have criticized the reluctance of some Republicans to distance themselves from the proponents of the conspiracy theories, suggesting that "Republican officials are reluctant to denounce the birthers for fear of alienating an energetic part of their party's base." NBC News' "First Read" team commented: "the real story in all of this is that Republican Party has a HUGE problem with its base right now."

Republican National Committee Chairman Michael Steele released a statement through his spokesperson saying, "Chairman Steele believes that this is an unnecessary distraction and believes that the president is a U.S. citizen."

Political analyst Marc Ambinder of The Atlantic and CBS News suggests this phenomenon goes to the heart of the dilemma now facing the Republican Party, positing that

Republican presidential candidates need to figure out how to diffuse [sic] angry birthers who are bound to show up and demand their attention. If they give credence to the birthers, they're not only advancing ignorance but also betraying the narrowness of their base. If they dismiss this growing movement, they might drive birthers to find more extreme candidates, which will fragment a Republican political coalition.

Political analyst Andrew Sullivan, writing in The Sunday Times, stated

The demographics tell the basic story: a black man is president and a large majority of white southerners cannot accept that, even in 2009. They grasp conspiracy theories to wish Obama – and the America he represents – – away. Since white southerners comprise an increasing proportion of the 22% of Americans who still describe themselves as Republican, the GOP can neither dismiss the crankery nor move past it. The fringe defines what's left of the Republican centre.

On July 27, 2009, the House of Representatives passed a resolution commemorating the 50th anniversary of Hawaii's statehood. The resolution, containing language recognizing Hawaii as President Obama's birth state, passed by a vote of 378–0.

=== Opinion surveys ===
In October 2008, the Orange County Register's OC Political Pulse poll found that a third of responding Republicans believed that Obama had been born outside the United States. As a result of the widespread publicity given to the citizenship controversy, 60% of respondents in an Ohio State University survey carried out in November 2008 had heard of the issue. However, only 10% believed the claims that Obama was not a citizen.

A Public Policy Polling survey carried out in August 2009 found that 32% of Republicans in Virginia thought that Obama was born in the U.S., 41% thought he was foreign-born and the remaining 27% were unsure.

In Utah, an August 2009 poll carried out for the Deseret News and KSL-TV found that 67% of Utahns accepted the evidence that Obama was born in the U.S. The poll found that those who do not believe that Obama was born in the United States, or do not know, are predominantly middle-aged, lower-income Republican-leaning individuals without a college education.

A Pew Research Center poll found that 80% of Americans had heard about the Obama citizenship claims by August 2009. The poll found a significant partisan divide in views of the news coverage, with 58% of Democrats saying that the allegations had received too much attention from the media. Republicans were more inclined to say that the allegations had received too little attention, with 39% expressing this view against only 26% saying that the controversy had received too much attention.

In a Harris Poll online survey of 2,320 adults conducted in March 2010, 25% of the respondents said they believed that Obama was "not born in the United States and so is not eligible to be president". In a July 2010 CNN poll of adult Americans, 16% said they had doubts that Obama was born in the United States, and a further 11% were certain that he was not.

The percentage of doubters plummeted after President Obama released the long form certificate in April 2011. A Gallup telephone poll of 1018 adults conducted in May 2011 found that 5% of respondents believed that Obama was "definitely born in another country" and 8% believed he was "probably born in another country", versus 47% believing he was "definitely" and 18% "probably" born in the US. Broken down by political affiliation, the same poll found that 23% of self-identified Republicans, 14% of independents, and 5% of Democrats thought Obama was definitely or probably born in another country.

In July 2016, four months before Donald Trump was elected to the presidency, 41 percent of Republicans disagreed that Obama was born in the United States and 31 percent neither agreed nor disagreed, per an NBC poll.

A 2015 study found that among individuals who held birther views, they were predominantly conservative/Republican and held anti-Black attitudes. A 2019 study found that "among white Americans, birther beliefs are uniquely associated with racial animus."

=== Dilemma for Republicans ===
Because a portion of Republican voters and their Tea Party supporters believed Obama was not eligible to hold public office (see Opinion surveys section), Republicans sometimes found themselves caught in a dilemma between losing support or damaging their credibility. They had "to walk the fine line of humoring conspiracy-minded supporters without explicitly questioning Obama's legitimacy ..." Other Republicans, including former Minnesota governor Tim Pawlenty and former Pennsylvania senator Rick Santorum, however, have plainly rejected these claims.

An example of these situations was Michael Castle, then Representative for Delaware, who ran in 2010 for the Senate seat vacated by Vice President Joe Biden. At a town hall meeting, Castle was confronted by constituents who jeered him for insisting that Obama is a citizen of the United States. Castle, one of the leading Republican moderates in the House, was later defeated by Tea Party-backed Christine O'Donnell in the Republican primary, who herself later lost the general election to Democratic nominee Chris Coons.

== Commentary and criticism ==
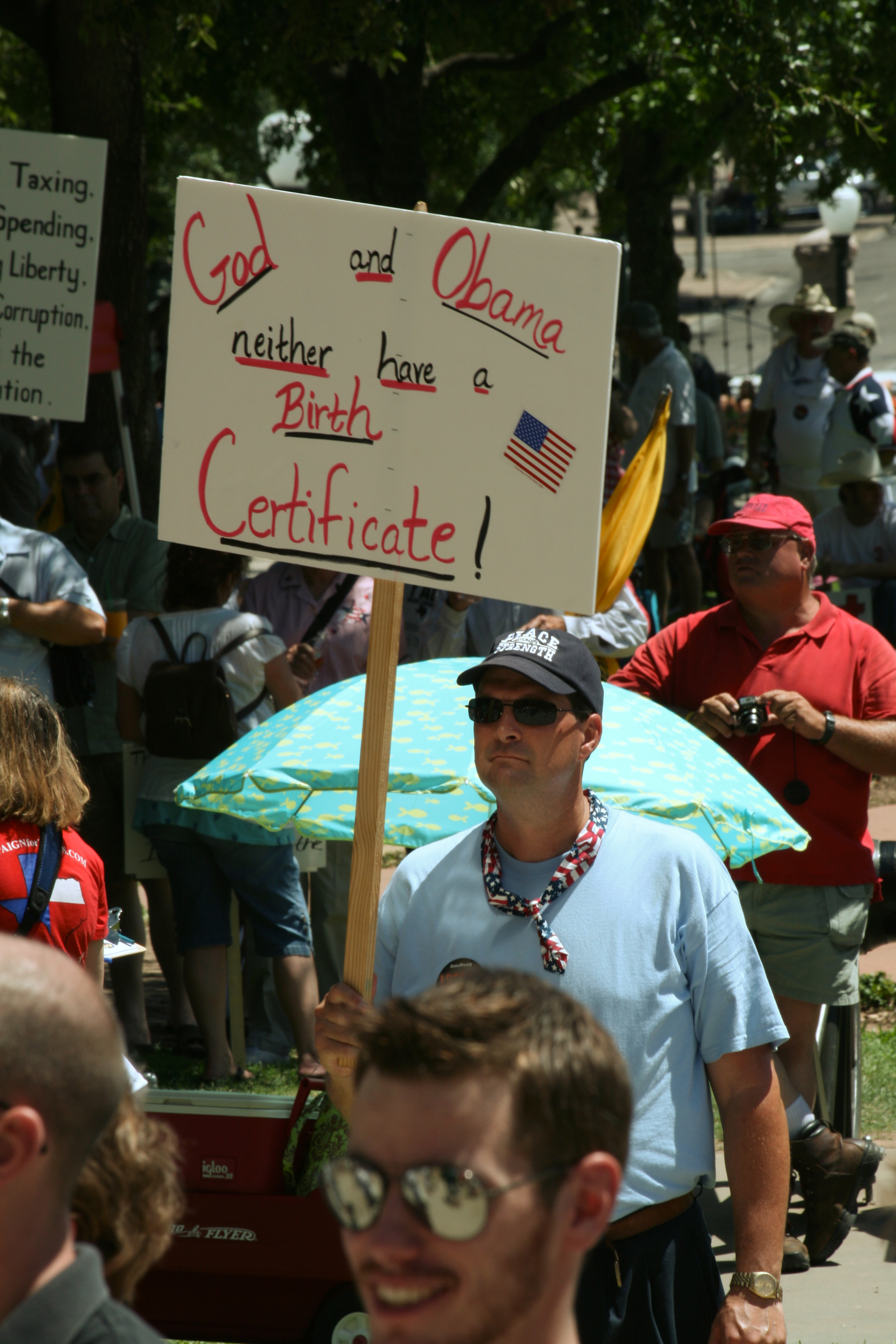
A man carrying a sign at a Tea Party protest in Austin, Texas, on July 4, 2009

Proponents of claims doubting Obama's eligibility have been dubbed "birthers" by their critics, who have drawn a parallel with 9/11 conspiracy theorists or "truthers". Leslie Savan of The Nation has compared the so-called "birthers" to other groups as well, including those who deny the Moon landing, the Holocaust or global warming, "Teabaggers who refuse to believe they must pay taxes" and creationists who believe the earth is 6,000 years old. Historian Matthew Dallek compares birtherism to conspiracy theories promoted by the John Birch Society (JBS), such as the JBS belief that the civil rights movement was part of a massive, Communist conspiracy from abroad. Birthers, he argues, "unwittingly tapped this inheritance." MSNBC political commentator Rachel Maddow has defined a "birther" as:

A specific new breed of American conspiracy theorists who believe that the real problem with Barack Obama being president is that he can't possibly have been born in the United States. He's not eligible to be president. The birth certificate is a fake. He's a foreigner. Once this has been exposed, I guess, he will be run out of the White House ...

A number of conservative commentators have criticized its proponents and their effect on the wider conservative movement. Talk show host Michael Medved has also been critical, calling them "the worst enemy of the conservative movement" for making other conservatives "look sick, troubled and not suitable for civilized company". Conservative columnist Ann Coulter has referred to them as "just a few cranks".

An editorial in the Honolulu Star-Bulletin dismissed the claims about Obama's eligibility as proposing "a vast conspiracy involving Obama's parents, state officials, the news media, the Secret Service, think-tanks and a host of yet-to-be-uncovered others who have connived since Obama's birth to build a false record so that he could eventually seek the presidency 47 years later." The St. Petersburg Times' fact-checking website, PolitiFact, concluded its series of articles on the birth certificate issue by saying:

There is not one shred of evidence to disprove PolitiFact's conclusion that the candidate's name is Barack Hussein Obama, or to support allegations that the birth certificate he released isn't authentic. And that's true no matter how many people cling to some hint of doubt and use the Internet to fuel their innate sense of distrust.

In November 2008, commentator and social critic Camille Paglia criticized the "blathering, fanatical overkill" of the topic, but also questioned Obama's response: "Obama could have ended the entire matter months ago by publicly requesting Hawaii to issue a fresh, long-form, stamped certificate and inviting a few high-profile reporters in to examine the document and photograph it," she said. A parenthetical in the same article noted that "the campaign did make the 'short-form' certificate available to Factcheck.org."

Factcheck.org noted, "The Hawaii Department of Health's birth record request form does not give the option to request a photocopy of your long-form birth certificate, but their short form has enough information to be acceptable to the State Department."

Writing in December 2008, Alex Koppelman discussed the validity of the common argument – that Obama should release a copy of his full, original certificate and the rumors and doubts would disappear. Conspiracy theory experts told Koppelman that when committed conspiracists are presented with more data debunking their theory, they refuse to accept the new evidence. "Whatever can't be ignored can be twisted to fit into the narrative; every new disclosure of something that should, by rights, end the controversy only opens up new questions, identifies new plotters," he wrote. Because Obama's release of the short-form had only "stoked the fever of conspiracy mongers", Koppelman predicted that releasing the long-form certificate "would almost certainly" continue the rumor cycle.

In response to the notion that Obama's grandparents might have planted a birth announcement in newspapers just so their grandson could some day be president, FactCheck suggested that "those who choose to go down that path should first equip themselves with a high-quality tinfoil hat." Brooks Jackson, the director of FactCheck, comments that "it all reflects a surge of paranoid distress among people who don't like Barack Obama" and who want the election results to go away. Chip Berlet, a journalist who has studied the spread of conspiracy theories, notes:

For some people, when their side loses an election, the only explanation that makes sense to them – that they can cope with – is that sinister, bad, evil people arranged some kind of fraud.

American political writer Dana Milbank, writing for The Washington Post, described the Obama citizenship theories of Bob Schulz (chairman of the We the People Foundation, which in 2008 publicly challenged Obama's citizenship) as "tales from the tinfoil-hat brigade". Colorado presidential elector Camilla Auger, responding to lobbying of members of the Electoral College, commented: "I was concerned that there are that many nutty people in the country making depressing, absurd allegations."

Some commentators have asserted that racism is a factor motivating the promotion of Obama citizenship conspiracy theories. J. Richard Cohen, the President of the Southern Poverty Law Center, an organization that monitors hate groups and extremism, wrote an e-mail to supporters in July 2009 declaring: "This conspiracy theory was concocted by an anti-Semite and circulated by racist extremists who cannot accept the fact that a black man has been elected president." An academic psychologist commented that a study published in the Journal of Experimental Social Psychology supported a conclusion that racism has played a role. Donald Trump's questioning how Obama gained admission to two Ivy-League institutions, as well as his comment, "I have a great relationship with the blacks", led David Remnick, David Letterman and Bill Maher, among others, to accuse Trump of racism, and an increased attention on race with respect to Obama. In April 2011, Marilyn Davenport, a Tea Party activist and member of the executive committee of the Republican Party's local Orange County, California, organization, created a nationwide controversy when she circulated a photograph by email, widely seen as racist, that had been edited to depict Barack Obama as the child of two chimpanzees, and to which she had added the caption, "Now you know why no birth certificate". The party chapter censured her and asked her to resign, but she refused. Following the release of Obama's long-form certificate later that month, The New York Times remarked in an editorial that, "It is inconceivable that this campaign to portray Mr. Obama as the insidious 'other' would have been conducted against a white president."

== Legislation and litigation ==
The controversy over Obama's citizenship and eligibility for the presidency prompted a number of Republican state and federal legislators to propose legislation aimed at requiring future presidential candidates to release copies of their birth certificates. Some legislators also lent their support to birth certificate-related litigation against Obama, joining as co-plaintiffs.

Although Obama was confirmed as president-elect by Congress on January 8, 2009, and sworn in as President on January 20, litigation continued into his presidency. Numerous individuals and groups filed state or federal lawsuits seeking to have Obama disqualified from standing or being confirmed for the Presidency, or to compel him to release additional documentation relating to his citizenship. By mid-December 2008, at least 17 lawsuits had been filed challenging Obama's eligibility in states including North Carolina, Ohio, Pennsylvania, Hawaii, Connecticut, New Jersey, Texas and Washington. No such suit resulted in the grant of any relief to the plaintiffs by any court; all of the cases were rejected in lower courts. Three post-election suits were dismissed by the Supreme Court of the United States.

In April 2011, the Arizona legislature became the first to pass a bill "requiring President Obama and other presidential candidates to prove their U.S. citizenship before their names can appear on the state's ballot". The bill, HB 2177, was vetoed by Governor Jan Brewer on April 18.

Obama is not the first President to be the subject of controversy surrounding the location of his birth. Andrew Jackson was the subject of similar claims, although it is not certain that they were raised during his presidency. Some said that Chester A. Arthur was born outside the United States, with his birth records later allegedly falsified to show he was born in Vermont.

== Impact on the 2012 presidential election and beyond ==
In May 2012, the Arizona Secretary of State, Ken Bennett, asked Hawaii to verify Obama's Hawaiian birth to ensure his eligibility to appear on the November ballot. After Bennett proved that he needed the information as part of the regular course of official business, Hawaii officially confirmed that the information in the copy of the Certificate of Live Birth for the President matches the original record in their files. Later the same month, the Mississippi state Democratic Party requested Hawaii to verify that the long-form image on the White House website matched the copy on file, and they were provided with a certified verification, bearing the state seal and signed by state registrar Alvin T. Onaka, who had certified both released birth certificates.

In September 2012, the State Objections Board of Kansas, composed of "three of the state's top elected Republicans", delayed acting on a petition to remove Barack Obama's name from the ballot, requesting information from Hawaii regarding his birth certificate; however, they later voted unanimously to accept Obama's citizenship and retain him on the state's ballot, despite objections from the floor by Orly Taitz.

== White House responses ==
A common claim among those arguing that President Obama was not born in Hawaii is that all doubt would be settled if Obama released his "long form" birth certificate. However, commentators noted that doing so would be disadvantageous to Obama. First, it would encourage speculation as to why it took so long to release the document. Second, caving in to his political adversaries' demands would embolden them by giving them a victory. Finally, it would open the door to demands for other personal records unrelated to his birth certificate. Despite these concerns, both Obama and his press secretary have responded to reporters' questions about the issue.

=== Press secretary's response ===
At the end of the May 27, 2009, press briefing, WorldNetDaily reporter Lester Kinsolving asked about Obama's birth certificate. White House press secretary Robert Gibbs replied "It's on the Internet", to which Kinsolving responded "No, no, no – the long form listing his hospital and physician". Gibbs responded as follows:

Lester, this question in many ways continues to astound me. The state of Hawaii provided a copy with the seal of the President's birth. I know there are apparently at least 400,000 people (laughter) that continue to doubt the existence of and the certification by the state of Hawaii of the President's birth there, but it's on the Internet because we put it on the Internet for each of those 400,000 to download.

At a July 27, 2009, press briefing, radio talk show host Bill Press asked Gibbs if there was anything he could say to make the issue go away. Gibbs answered, "No. I mean, the God's honest truth is no," because "nothing will assuage" those who continue to pursue what he called "made-up, fictional nonsense" despite the evidence that Obama had already provided.

On August 6, 2009, Gibbs commented, "You couldn't sell this script in Hollywood," and summarized the contentions that he considered "totally crazy":

A pregnant woman leaves her home to go overseas to have a child – who there's not a passport for – so is in cahoots with someone ... to smuggle that child, that previously doesn't exist on a government roll somewhere back into the country and has the amazing foresight to place birth announcements in the Hawaii newspapers? All while this is transpiring in cahoots with those in the border, all so some kid named Barack Obama could run for President 46 and a half years later.

=== Barack Obama's response ===
"Remarks on Birth Certificate" (5:22)
President Obama discusses the release of his long-form birth certificate in April 2011.

"Remarks on Birth Certificate"
audio only version

At the February 2010 National Prayer Breakfast, Obama commented, "Surely you can question my policies without questioning my faith. Or for that matter my citizenship." He directly addressed the issue in August 2010, in an interview with Brian Williams. Williams asked Obama about the fact that a fifth of the American people do not believe that he is either American born or a Christian. Obama responded that "there is a mechanism, a network of misinformation that in a new media era can get churned out there constantly." He then added, "I can't spend all my time with my birth certificate plastered on my forehead."

In an April 2011 interview with George Stephanopoulos, Obama said, "I think that over the last two and a half years there's been an effort to go at me in a way that is politically expedient in the short-term for Republicans, but creates, I think a problem for them when they want to actually run in a general election where most people feel pretty confident the President was born where he says he was, in Hawaii. He doesn't have horns. We may disagree with him on some issues and we may wish that you know, the unemployment rate was coming down faster and we want him to know his plan on gas prices. But we're not really worrying about conspiracy theories or ... birth certificates. And so ... I think it presents a problem for them."

On April 27, 2011, referring to "sideshows and carnival barkers", Obama appeared in the White House press room an hour after the release of the long form and said, "I know there is going to be a segment of people for which no matter what we put out this issue will not be put to rest. But I am speaking to the vast majority of the American people, as well as to the press. We do not have time for this kind of silliness. We've got better stuff to do."

==== Joking acknowledgements ====
On several occasions, Obama joked about the conspiracy theories surrounding his birth certificate and citizenship. At the 2010 White House Correspondents' Dinner, Obama said there are few things in life harder to find and more important to keep than love, and then added, "Well, love and a birth certificate."

At the 2011 Gridiron Dinner, Obama referred to Bruce Springsteen's song, "Born in the U.S.A.", and commented, "Some things just bear repeating."

On March 17, 2011 (Saint Patrick's Day), Obama said, "Now, speaking of ancestry, there has been some controversy about my own background. Two years into my presidency, some are still bent on peddling rumors about my origins. So today, I want to put all those rumors to rest. It is true my great-great-great-grandfather really was from Ireland. It's true. Moneygall, to be precise. I can't believe I have to keep pointing this out."

At the 2011 White House Correspondents' Dinner, following the release of his long-form Hawaiian birth certificate, Obama declared that he would "go a step further" and release his "official birth video"—actually a clip from the opening of The Lion King (1994) where Simba is born in the African savanna—after which he defeatedly remarked, "Oh well. Back to square one." He then clarified "to the Fox News table" that he was indeed joking, and that they could contact Disney for the "original long-form version". Later in 2011, Obama's re-election campaign offered for sale mugs with a picture of Obama (captioned "Made in the USA") and the image of the birth certificate. The campaign states, "There's really no way to make the conspiracy about President Obama's birth certificate completely go away, so we might as well laugh at it – and make sure as many people as possible are in on the joke."

On January 17, 2012, during a televised tribute to actress Betty White on her 90th birthday, Obama taped a segment in which he wrote White a letter saying that, given her appearance and vitality, he not only could not believe she was 90, he did not believe her, and requested to see her birth certificate.

== See also ==
- Barack Obama religion conspiracy theories
- Birthright citizenship in the United States
- Chester A. Arthur
- Dreams from My Real Father
- Early life and career of Barack Obama
- Security paper
- Where's the Birth Certificate?
