= Abstract of judgment =

"Abstract of judgment" is a written summary of a judgment which states how much money the losing defendant owes to the person who won the lawsuit (judgment creditor), the rate of interest to be paid on the judgment amount, court costs, and any specific orders that the losing defendant (judgment debtor) must obey, which abstract is acknowledged and stamped so that it can be recorded and made official with the government.

The purpose of an abstract of judgment is to create a public record and create a lien or claim if necessary on any real estate property owned or later acquired by the defendant located in the county in which the abstract of judgment is recorded. If the loser does not pay the judgment voluntarily then the winner can force a sheriff's sale of any property to collect. There are several problems: 1) to find the county where the loser owns real estate property; 2) the probability that there are secured loans, tax liens and/or other judgments that have priority over the judgment lien; 3) the possibility that the loser/debtor may go bankrupt and avoid paying the debt.

== United Kingdom ==
An abstract is a brief summary of a judicial judgment, usually written by a barrister or academic for publication in law reports.

Abstracts are of particular use in legal research because they condense the essential points of long, complex judgments into a few paragraphs. A researcher can use abstracts to investigate how relevant a particular case is to the issue at hand, and hence to decide whether he or she should go on to read the entire judgment.

== United States ==
The term "abstract of judgment" may be used in a generic sense to describe a condensed summary of a court case, but it is chiefly used in a technical sense to describe a document produced by a court which describes the judgment rendered in a case.

=== Criminal law ===
An abstract of judgment is a clerical document containing a summary of court proceedings which may be useful though not conclusive in proving a prior conviction for the purposes of enhancement. United States v. Gutierrez-Ramirez, 405 F.3d 352, 357 - 58 (5th Cir. 2005) (finding a sentencing court could not rely on an abstract of judgment to determine whether a prior conviction qualifies to enhance a sentence); United States v. Navidad-Marcos, 367 F.3d 903, 908 - 09 (9th Cir. 2004) (holding an abstract of judgment did not "unequivocally" establish that a defendant entered a guilty plea); see also United States. v. Price, 366 U.S. App. D.C. 166, 409 F.3d 436, 445 (D.C. Cir. 2005).

In California, an abstract of judgment is a document transmitted by a superior court to a county sheriff after entry of a judgment of conviction in a criminal action. The abstract summarizes the crimes of which the defendant was convicted, and all sentences and enhancements imposed for those crimes (including whether those various sentencing components are to run concurrently or consecutively to one another). It also summarizes presentencing credits earned by the defendant for time served in the county jail while awaiting trial and sentencing. Receipt of an abstract of judgment triggers the sheriff's obligation to promptly deliver the prisoner and the abstract of judgment to the custody of the secretary of the California Department of Corrections and Rehabilitation (CDCR) (formerly, the director of the Department of Corrections) at a designated state prison. During the inmate reception and classification process, a CDCR analyst uses the abstract of judgment to compute the number of days which must be actually served by the prisoner in CDCR custody, and then a separate in-custody credit scheme is applied by CDCR from that point forward (e.g., good conduct credit) to further reduce the prisoner's sentence. Thus, the accuracy of one's abstract of judgment is of great importance to convicts held in CDCR custody, since errors in the calculation of their original total sentence on the abstract can unnecessarily lengthen their time in the state prison system.

=== Property law ===
In some states, such as Texas, an abstract of judgment is a specific type of document provided either by the court clerk or by an attorney which is used to prove that a judgment has been rendered. The abstract may then be filed in another jurisdiction, where it constitutes notice of a "judgment lien" on the debtor's real property, thereby preventing the transfer of that property until the judgment has been paid. This process was described by the Supreme Court of the United States in 1987:

See Tex. Prop. Code Ann. § 52.002 (1984) (directing clerk to issue an abstract of the judgment "on application of a person in whose favor a judgment is rendered"; no exception for superseded judgments); Thulemeyer v. Jones, 37 Tex. 560, 571 (1872). The bond's only effect would be to prevent Pennzoil from executing the judgment and obtaining Texaco's property.

Pennzoil Co. v. Texaco, Inc., 481 U.S. 1, 5 (U.S. 1987)
