= Rick Reed (advertising agent) =

American advertising agent (1953–2022)

- Born: Richard Gardner Reed; May 24, 1953; Wakefield, Massachusetts, U.S.
- Died: August 17, 2022 (aged 69); Alexandria, Virginia, U.S.
- Education: Franklin & Marshall College; Harvard Kennedy School
- Occupation: Advertising agent
- Political party: Republican
- Children: 1

Richard Gardner Reed (May 24, 1953 – August 17, 2022) was an American advertising agent. A member of the Republican Party, Reed was known for his attack ads against John Kerry during the 2004 United States presidential election, which led to the coining of the term swiftboating.

== Biography ==
Reed was born in Wakefield, Massachusetts, to Priscilla Swett, a physician assistant, and Gardner Chase Reed, a financial advisor. He was raised in Chatham, Massachusetts. Reed attended the Franklin & Marshall College, graduating in 1975. He also attended Harvard Kennedy School, where he earned his master's degree in public administration.

Reed had worked for Ronald Reagan's unsuccessful 1976 presidential campaign. He was later hired to work at Stevens Reed Curcio & Potholm, a campaign advertising firm. Reed worked on advertising campaigns for many Republican politicians, including George W. Bush, Peter Fitzgerald, John Warner, and Lindsey Graham. He was involved in John McCain's 2000 presidential campaign. In 2004, he became known for his "Swift Boat" attack ads against John Kerry, which accused Kerry of lying about his service in the Vietnam War. The ads, produced for the group Swift Vets and POWs for Truth, lead to the coining of the term swiftboating to describe an unfair or untrue political attack. He helped produce ads for Donald Trump's 2016 campaign and served as Trump's media advisor. Fox News presenter Tucker Carlson described Reed as "the smartest political consultant I know".

Reed died in August 2022 at his home in Alexandria, Virginia, at the age of 69.
