= John Kerry military service controversy =

2004 American political issue

During John Kerry's candidacy in the 2004 U.S. presidential campaign, a political issue that gained widespread public attention was Kerry's Vietnam War record. In television advertisements and a book called Unfit for Command, co-authored by John O'Neill and Jerome Corsi, the Swift Boat Veterans for Truth (SBVT), a 527 group later known as the Swift Vets and POWs for Truth, questioned details of his military service record and circumstances relating to the awarding of his combat medals. Their campaign against Kerry's presidential bid received widespread publicity, but was later discredited and gave rise to the neologism "swiftboating", to describe an unfair or untrue political attack. Defenders of Kerry's service record, including former crewmates, stated that allegations made by SBVT were false.

== Swift Boat Veterans for Truth ==
Of the approximately 3,600 Swift boat sailors who served in Vietnam, the names of some 200 appeared on the group's statement against Kerry; most did not serve at the same time or in the same place as Kerry. Of those who served in Kerry's boat crew, only Stephen Gardner joined SBVT. He was not present on any of the occasions when Kerry earned his medals, including his Purple Hearts. Gardner appeared in two of the group's television advertisements. All other living members of Kerry's crew supported his presidential bid, and some frequently campaigned with him as his self-described "band of brothers". Kerry crew members have disputed some of SBVT's various allegations, calling them "totally false" (Drew Whitlow), "garbage" (Gene Thorson), and "a pack of lies" (Del Sandusky). Several members of Swift Boat Veterans for Truth (SBVT) served in the same unit as Kerry, although Gardner was the only one to serve on Kerry's boat. A number of Kerry's SBVT critics were present on accompanying Swift Boats at one of the combat events for which Kerry was decorated with the Bronze Star Medal and a third Purple Heart. Another SBVT member, Dr. Louis Letson, was the physician who claims to have treated Kerry for his first Purple Heart wound. Larry Clayton Lee was the sole SBVT member to participate in the event for which Kerry was awarded the Silver Star. No SBVT member participated in events related to the award of Kerry's second Purple Heart.

In addition to questioning the merit of many of Kerry's service awards, SBVT decried his post-Vietnam anti-war activity and disputed the truthfulness of his subsequent testimony about the conduct of the American military as demonstrated in that war. Many political observers saw this as reflecting the "true reason behind the Swift Boat campaign." All of the allegations referencing Kerry's Vietnam service and awards were made during Kerry's 2004 presidential campaign while Kerry's post-Vietnam anti-war activity had long been a subject of controversy.

Defenders of John Kerry's service record, including nearly all of his former crewmates, have stated that SBVT's allegations are false.

== Allegations and evidence ==
=== Purple Heart – general criteria ===
The criteria for the Purple Heart call for its award for any injury received during combat requiring treatment by a medical officer; the military makes no distinction regarding the severity of the injury. Under military regulations, the Purple Heart can also be awarded for "friendly fire" wounds in the "heat of battle," so long as the fire is targeted "under full intent of inflicting damage or destroying enemy troops or equipment."

An article in The Boston Globe described the circumstances in which Purple Hearts were given to wounded Swift Boat personnel in Vietnam:

"There were an awful lot of Purple Hearts—from shrapnel; some of those might have been M-40 grenades," said George Elliott, Kerry's commanding officer. "The Purple Hearts were coming down in boxes. Kerry, he had three Purple Hearts. None of them took him off duty. Not to belittle it, that was more the rule than the exception."

In Douglas Brinkley's book Tour of Duty: John Kerry and the Vietnam War, Brinkley notes that Purple Hearts were given out frequently:

As generally understood, the Purple Heart is given to any U.S. citizen wounded in wartime service to the nation. Giving out Purple Hearts increased as the United States started sending Swifts up rivers. Sailors—no longer safe on aircraft carriers or battleships in the Gulf of Tonkin—were starting to bleed, a lot.

According to the Los Angeles Times:

Navy rules during the Vietnam War governing Purple Hearts did not take into account a wound's severity—and specified only that injuries had to be suffered "in action against an enemy".

A Times review of Navy injury reports and awards from that period in Kerry's Swift boat unit shows that many other Swift boat personnel received Purple Hearts for slight wounds of uncertain origin.

==== First Purple Heart ====
Some SBVT members have questioned the propriety of Kerry's first Purple Heart, received for a wound sustained on December 2, 1968. Kerry remained on duty after being wounded, and sought treatment at the following day's sick call. They assert that the injury was too minor to merit a citation because the only treatment Kerry received, after the removal of a piece of shrapnel from his arm, was bacitracin (an antibiotic) and a bandage, and he returned to service immediately. Other division members, including at least one SBVT member, received Purple Hearts under similar circumstances. SBVT also claims that the wound was not from enemy fire but was from shrapnel of a grenade he threw himself, "Self-inflicted wounds were awarded if incurred 'in the heat of battle, and not involving gross negligence.' Kerry's critics insist his wound would not have qualified, but former Navy officials who worked in the service's awards branch at the time said such awards were routine.

On the night in question, Kerry was not on a Swift Boat, but on a 15-foot skimmer. Kerry opened fire on suspected guerrillas on the shore. During this encounter, Kerry suffered a shrapnel wound in the left arm above the elbow. Accounts differ over the crew aboard the skimmer, the source of Kerry's injury—Kerry has stated that he does not know where the shrapnel came from—and several other major details.

James Wasser, who later became Kerry's radarman on PCF 44, was serving as an interpreter on board-and-search missions at the time; on the night of December 2 he was on the Swift boat accompanying the skimmer, interrogating fishermen picked up by the skimmer.

SBVT's claims about the incident are primarily based on an account by retired Rear Admiral William Schachte, then a lieutenant. Schachte has stated that he regularly led training missions for recently arrived officers such as Kerry. One tactic described by Schachte was for a Swift Boat to tow the skimmer to the target area and wait nearby. The skimmer, manned by three people, "would go in, draw fire and get out immediately." The waiting Swift Boats or air support would attack the enemies thus detected. Schachte stated that he had participated in all previous skimmer missions up to and including the night Kerry was injured, although the latter claim could not be substantiated.

In an interview in 2003, Schachte made no mention of being on the skimmer with Kerry that night; in addition, he described the action as a "firefight" and said of Kerry, "He got hit." In August 2004, however, Schachte stated that he was the senior officer on Kerry's skimmer that night, with one enlisted man also on board, that he popped a flare after detecting movement, and opened fire. He stated that there was no return fire, and that Kerry was "nicked" by a fragment from an M-79 grenade launcher he fired himself. Moreover, while Schachte has described Kerry as, at the time, a "rookie [who] would never be put in command" of a skimmer mission, Kerry was actually given command of a Swift Boat and crew just three days after the skimmer mission and sent into a combat area.

Kerry crewmates Bill Zaladonis and Patrick Runyon dispute Schachte's 2004 account. Zaladonis stated that "Myself, Pat Runyon, and John Kerry, we were the only ones in the skimmer." Runyon added, "Me and Bill aren't the smartest, but we can count to three." They recounted that the skimmer opened fire on suspected guerrillas attempting to evade the patrol, as they ran from sampan boats onto the shore. Both Runyon and Zaladonis believe, but are not completely certain, that the skimmer received return hostile fire; Runyon commented, "It was the scariest night of my life." Runyon also stated that he is "100 percent certain" that no one on the boat fired a grenade launcher. Zaladonis has noted that Schachte went on "a bunch of" other skimmer missions and speculated that Schachte might have inadvertently mixed up his dates.

In an SBVT television ad, Dr. Lewis Letson asserted, "I know John Kerry is lying about his first Purple Heart because I treated him for that injury," but did not specify the alleged lie; he subsequently gave varied accounts of his purported interaction with Kerry. Kerry's medical records list a medic, J. C. Carreon, as the "person administering treatment" for this wound. Dr. Letson's name does not appear on the record, but Letson claimed it was common for medics to sign the paperwork even though Letson would treat the patient. That claim cannot be verified as Carreon died in 1992. In addition, Letson claimed he was given information by way of Kerry's crewmen who accompanied him to the clinic, but neither Zaladonis nor Runyon accompanied Kerry, nor has any crewman who was on the nearby Swift Boat supported this claim.

SBVT member Grant Hibbard, who was Kerry's commander at the time, has claimed that Kerry came to him the morning after the incident, after he had been to sick bay, stating that he was eligible for a Purple Heart. Hibbard has also claimed that he denied Kerry's request and does not know how the award eventually came to be granted, although he had initially stated that he acquiesced on the matter of the award. The presentation letter for the award was dated February 28, 1969.

In addition, Hibbard stated in Unfit for Command (Chapter 3) that he had been told that "our units had fired on some VC units running on the beach," which if true would meet the criteria for the Purple Heart.

SBVT also points to the narration of a subsequent event in Tour of Duty (pp. 188–189). Brinkley opens the account of a four-day cruise by stating that "Kerry—who had just turned 25 on December 11, 1968—was a fine leader of his men". He goes on to quote Kerry's reflections in his notebook: "A cocky feeling of invincibility accompanied us up the Long Tau shipping channel because we hadn't been shot at yet, and Americans at war who haven't been shot at are allowed to be cocky." SBVT argues that this journal entry shows that the December 2 incident could not have involved enemy fire. Others argue that Kerry was referring to ambushes, a common misfortune for Swift Boats which Kerry had not yet suffered, or to the crew collectively, as he used the term "we" instead of "I", and most of his crewmembers clearly had been "shot at" before.

=== Bronze Star ===
Kerry's Bronze Star was criticized by former Swift Boat commander Larry Thurlow. During the incident leading to the medal, Thurlow was in tactical command of five boats, including Kerry's. The incident began when one of the boats struck a mine. In 2004 Thurlow, along with two other SBVT members, alleged that Kerry's citation for bravery under fire is false because neither Kerry's boat nor any of the others was under hostile fire. In an affidavit about the incident, Thurlow testified, "I never heard a shot." Of the three boat commanders present besides Kerry and Thurlow, two are SBVT members who now claim that there was no hostile fire during the incident. But one was seriously wounded with a concussion and the other left the scene early to accompany the wounded to safety. Only Kerry and Thurlow remained behind to work on damage control. The other boat commander present, Don Droz, was later killed in action; however, his widow recalls Droz's account as being consistent with Kerry's.

Several other witnesses insist that there was hostile fire during the incident. Jim Rassmann, the Special Forces captain Kerry rescued, wrote, "Machine-gun fire erupted from both banks of the river. … When I surfaced, all the Swift boats had left, and I was alone taking fire from both banks. To avoid the incoming fire, I repeatedly swam under water." Del Sandusky, the helmsman on Kerry's boat, PCF-94, stated, "I saw the gun flashes in the jungle, and I saw the bullets skipping across the water." Wayne Langhofer, who manned the machine gun on Don Droz's PCF-43, stated, "There was a lot of firing going on, and it came from both sides of the river." Michael Medeiros, aboard PCF-94, recalled "a massive ambush. There were rockets and light machine gun fire plus small arms." Jim Russell, the Psychological Operations Officer of the unit, who was on Kerry's boat (PCF-43), wrote "All the time we were taking small arms fire from the beach… Anyone who doesn't think that we were being fired upon must have been on a different river."

Although it is not mentioned in Unfit for Command, Thurlow was also awarded a Bronze Star for his actions during the same incident. Thurlow's citation includes several phrases indicating hostile fire such as "despite enemy bullets flying about him" and "enemy small arms and automatic weapons fire", and speaks of fire directed at "all units" of the five-boat fleet. Thurlow's medal recommendation, signed by Elliott, used the phrasing "under constant enemy small arms fire." Also unmentioned in Unfit for Command was Robert Lambert, Thurlow's chief petty officer who was the official eyewitness cited for Thurlow's Bronze Star recommendation, and who received his own Bronze Star for "courage under fire" for pulling Thurlow out of the water. Lambert still insists that the boats were receiving fire from the enemy.

The after-action report is initialed "KJW", whom SBVT claimed is Kerry. However, Kerry's initials are "JFK", and SBVT cites no reason why Kerry would have included a "W". These same initials "KJW" appear on other reports about events in which Kerry did not participate. A Navy official stated to the New York Times that the initials referred not to the author of the report, but to the headquarters staffer who received it.

Furthermore, Kerry's base commander, Adrian Lonsdale, stated that according to the precedence he had set out in his operations order, Kerry would be the "only logical candidate" to write the report based on his length of service in Vietnam. However, records indicate that Kerry actually had the least amount of time in Vietnam of any of the officers there that day (although Droz had arrived at Anthoi somewhat later than Kerry).

In addition, SBVT claimed that the after action report for the incident was sent from the Coast Guard cutter where Kerry had received medical treatment, the USCGC Spencer. but relevant Navy documents indicate that the report was likely transmitted from a ship with a routing indicator that would apply to the LST Washtenaw County (LST-1166), where all nonevacuated officers who had served on the mission were berthed for the night.

Finally, beyond the medal citations, all U.S. Navy documents indicate hostile fire during the action. Kerry's boat even received special recognition from Captain Roy Hoffmann on March 14 in his weekly report to his men; the report's description of hostile fire was not disputed at the time. PCF-94 had major damage that had to be repaired before it could resume patrols. Also, later intelligence reports confirm the presence of hostile forces.

=== Silver Star ===
Kerry's Silver Star medal was questioned by George Elliott, Kerry's former commanding officer and a member of SBVT. Elliott's stated position on the award changed during the course of the 2004 presidential campaign.

Kerry's medal citation indicates that he charged into an ambush, killing an enemy preparing to launch a rocket. In his 1969 performance evaluation, Elliott wrote "In a combat environment often requiring independent, decisive action, LTJG [Lieutenant Junior Grade] Kerry was unsurpassed. He constantly reviewed tactics and lessons learned in river operations and applied his experience at every opportunity. On one occasion, while in tactical command of a three boat operation his units were taken under fire from ambush. LTJG Kerry rapidly assessed the situation and ordered his units to turn directly into the ambush. This decision resulted in routing the attackers with several KIA [Killed in Action]. LTJG Kerry emerges as the acknowledged leader in his peer group. His bearing and appearance are above reproach."

During Kerry's 1996 Senate re-election campaign, when there was criticism of his Silver Star, Elliott responded: "The fact that he chased armed enemies down is not something to be looked down on." In June 2003, Elliott was quoted as saying the award was "well deserved" and that he had "no regrets or second thoughts at all about that."

During the 2004 campaign, however, Elliott signed two affidavits that criticize the award. The first, in July 2004, stated in part, "When Kerry came back to the United States, he lied about what occurred in Vietnam..." After the release of this first affidavit, Michael Kranish of the Boston Globe quoted Elliott saying, "It was a terrible mistake probably for me to sign the affidavit with those words. I'm the one in trouble here...I knew it was wrong...In a hurry I signed it and faxed it back. That was a mistake." Elliott contended that Kranish had substantially misquoted him, but the Globe stood by its account, calling the disputed quotes "absolutely accurate".

The story prompted Elliott to release a second affidavit, in August 2004, in which he stated, "Had I known the facts, I would not have recommended Kerry for the Silver Star for simply pursuing and dispatching a single wounded, fleeing Viet Cong." The second affidavit made what Elliott called an "immaterial clarification", in that he admitted that he had no personal knowledge of the circumstances of the shooting. Rather, his initial statement that Kerry had been dishonest was based on unspecified sources and a passage contributed by Kranish to a biography of Kerry.

However, although Elliott claims that he was not in possession of the facts of the event, the original citation that Elliott wrote (which is not the citation that appears in Unfit for Command) incorporates most of the details in the after action report. The report states that Kerry chased and shot a single wounded, fleeing Viet Cong. In addition, it states that the PCFs were filled with troops, that all three boats turned into the first ambush and beached, that the troops conducted the first sweep, and that while Kerry led the first landing party during the second sweep, the other landing parties and troops followed and took out the VC.

Kerry’s crew members who were there that day do not agree with Elliott’s characterization of the event in his 2004 affidavits. They contend that the enemy soldier, although wounded, was still a threat. For example, Fred Short, said, "The guy was getting ready to stand up with a rocket on his shoulder, coming up. And Mr. Kerry took him out... he would have been about a 30-yard shot... [T]here's no way he could miss us." Del Sandusky, Kerry’s second in command, described the consequences to the lightly armored Swift Boat: "Charlie would have lit us up like a Roman candle because we're full of fuel, we're full of ammunition." Another witness stated that the VC "had an entry wound at the side of his chest and exit wound at the opposite side of the chest cavity, a wound that was consistent with reports of the man turning to fire a second B-40 rocket."

The only member of SBVT who was present that day, Larry Clayton Lee, has stated he believes Kerry earned the Silver Star.

Another eyewitness, William Rood, a former Chicago Tribune editor, in a 2004 article gave an account that supports Kerry's version of the events of that day. Rood was commander of PCF-23, which was one of the two Swift Boats that accompanied Kerry's PCF-94.

Rood discounted several specific charges made by SBVT about the incident. In his (secondhand) book account, O'Neill implied that Kerry chased down a lone "teenager in a loincloth clutching a grenade launcher which may or may not have been loaded," without coming under enemy fire himself. In contrast, Rood stated that there were multiple attackers, there was heavy hostile fire, and the guerrilla Kerry shot was "a grown man, dressed in the kind of garb the Viet Cong usually wore" armed with a "loaded B-40 rocket launcher". Also, O'Neill called Kerry's tactic of charging the beach "stupidity, not courage." Similarly, Hoffman characterized Kerry's actions as reckless and impulsive. However, Rood stated that Kerry's tactic of charging the beach was discussed and mutually agreed with the other Swift boat commanders beforehand. He also notes that, at the time, Hoffman praised all three Swift boat commanders and called the tactics developed "a shining example of completely overwhelming the enemy" and that they "may be the most efficacious method of dealing with small numbers of ambushers." O'Neill responded that Rood's criticism was "extremely unfair" and stated that Rood's account of events is not substantially different from what appeared in his book Unfit for Command, for which Rood had declined an interview. The American eyewitnesses to the second sweep, including SBVT member Larry Clayton Lee, have stated that there were multiple VC at the scene of the second sweep.

The accounts of Vietnamese witnesses are consistent on several points with Rood's. Ba Thanh, the guerrilla killed while carrying the B-40 rocket launcher, was "big and strong" and in his late 20s. Return fire was also intense, according to Vo Van Tam, who was then a local Viet Cong commander: "I led Ba Thanh's comrades, the whole unit, to fight back. And we ran around the back and fought the Americans from behind. We worked with the city soldiers to fire on the American boats." No Vietnamese witnesses saw how Thanh died or saw him being chased by an American.

No individual who was present that day has disputed Kerry's version of events, nor suggested that he did not earn the Silver Star, and some said accounts given in Unfit for Command were incorrect.

O'Neill states that the Silver Star was awarded after only two days, "with no review".

Some critics questioned the reason for the existence of three versions of the Silver Star citation with variations in the wording, the first being signed by Vice Admiral Zumwalt, as Commander, U.S. Naval Forces, Vietnam, the second being signed by Admiral John Hyland as Commander in Chief, U.S. Pacific Fleet, and the third being signed by John Lehman, as Secretary of the Navy. In this connection, Mr. Lehman, who served as secretary from 1981 to 1987, was quoted as saying he had never seen or signed the most recent citation (Kerry citation a 'total mystery' to ex-Navy chief, Thomas Lipscomb, Chicago Sun-Times, Aug. 28, 2004). However, in its October 2004 documentation of its investigation of Kerry's medals, the office of the Navy inspector general described the first, longer version as the "COMUSNAVFOR Vietnam version, signed by VADM Zumwalt" and the second version as the "official version, signed by the delegated award authority, ADM Hyland, CINCPACFLT". As to the third version, the report described it as one of several "duplicate citations" that were issued in 1985 after "considerable correspondence indicating efforts over the years to chase down various citations", and stated that the ones under Lehman's name were likely signed by machine. In addition, in October 2004, Rowan Scarborough of the Washington Times reported:

Navy officials say that there is no evidence that Mr. Kerry's Silver Star, Bronze Star and three Purple Hearts were ever rescinded and that there is no evidence of misconduct in his records. He did receive new medal citations in the mid-1980s. Officials say the Navy receives scores, and perhaps hundreds, of such requests each year from veterans who want a second copy or have lost the originals. The citations are simply put through a machine that implants the signature of the current Navy secretary. John Lehman's signature, via a machine, appears on Mr. Kerry's new citation for his Silver Star.

Republican Sen. John Warner, who was Undersecretary of the Navy at the time, stated "We did extraordinary, careful checking on that type of medal, a very high one, when it goes through the secretary. I'd stand by the process that awarded that medal, and I think we best acknowledge that his heroism did gain that recognition." Elmo Zumwalt, Commander of the United States Naval Forces in Vietnam at that time, signed Kerry's original Silver Star citation and defended the award in 1996, saying "It is a disgrace to the United States Navy that there's any inference that the [medal] process was anything other than totally honest." Boston Herald, October 28, 1996.

=== Cambodia mission ===
On March 27, 1986, while giving a speech to the Senate, Kerry mentioned he was in Cambodia on a Swift Boat around Christmas 1968. During that encounter, Kerry said he was shot at by Vietnamese and Khmer Rouge Cambodians, while the President had told the American people that U.S. military personnel were not in Cambodia. According to the Boston Globe biography of Kerry, he later recalled that after the Christmas Eve incident, he began to develop a deep mistrust of U.S. government pronouncements.

One chapter of SBVT's Unfit for Command questioned Kerry's statements that he was in Cambodia during the war. Kerry did not claim to have been sent on a covert mission to Cambodia on Christmas Eve, 1968. Rather, he believed at the time he had crossed the border while on a patrol near the border, during which the boats were ambushed and later came under friendly fire from South Vietnamese soldiers. None of Kerry's crewmates confirmed being sent to Cambodia. One of Kerry's crewmen, SBVT member Steven Gardner, asserted that it was physically impossible to cross the Cambodian border, as it was blocked and patrolled by PBRs (a type of patrol boat); however, Kerry's boat was evidently patrolling with PBRs during the mission in question. Some crewmembers have, moreover, stated that they may at some point have entered Cambodia without knowing it. James Wasser, who was on PCF-44 on that December mission, while saying that he believed they were "very, very close" to Cambodia, did not recall actually crossing over; he also stated that it was very hard to tell their exact position in the border area. Kerry's own journal entry on this, written the night of the mission, does not specifically say they entered Cambodia. However, it does state that PCF-44 was somewhere "toward Cambodia" to provide cover for two smaller patrol boats, and in sarcasm, that he considered messaging Christmas greetings to his commanders "from the most inland Market Time unit" and that a court martial for the incident "would make sense" In addition, George Elliott noted in Kerry's fitness report that he had been in an ambush during the 24-hour Christmas truce, which began on Christmas Eve.

Michael Meehan, a spokesman for the Kerry campaign, responded to SBVT's charges with a statement that Kerry was referring to a period when Nixon had been president-elect and before he was inaugurated. Meehan went on to state that Kerry had been "deep in enemy waters" between Vietnam and Cambodia and that his boat came under fire at the Cambodian border. Meehan also said that Kerry did covertly cross over into Cambodia to drop off special operations forces on a later occasion, but that there was no paperwork for such missions and he could not supply dates.

Based on examination of Kerry's journals and logbook, historian Douglas Brinkley placed the covert missions soon after Christmas. In an interview with the London Daily Telegraph, Brinkley stated that Kerry had gone into Cambodian waters three or four times in January and February 1969 on clandestine missions, dropping off U.S. Navy SEALs, U.S. Army Green Berets, and CIA operatives. Brinkley added, "He was a ferry master, a drop-off guy, but it was dangerous as hell. Kerry carries a hat he was given by one CIA operative. In a part of his journals which I didn't use he writes about discussions with CIA guys he was dropping off."

In an interview with Tim Russert on NBC's "Meet the Press", Kerry corrected his 1979 statement about being "five miles across the border" on Christmas Eve, but reiterated that he was on a patrol at the border at that date and had been sent on a covert mission at a later date.

In the book, O'Neill argued that a Swift boat commander would have been "seriously disciplined or court-martialed" for crossing the Cambodian border. Critics point out the inconsistency between this description and O'Neill's own claims documented in a conversation with President Nixon in 1971 in which O'Neill told the President he had worked along the Cambodian border on the water in a Swift boat.

== Document release ==
Kerry has made his Vietnam journals and diaries available to his biographer, historian Douglas Brinkley, but has not made them otherwise publicly available. In declining to make the materials available to The Washington Post in 2004, the Kerry campaign cited an exclusivity agreement with Brinkley. However, Brinkley subsequently told the paper that he interpreted the agreement as requiring only that quotations from the materials cite his book.

During the 2004 campaign, Kerry released hundreds of documents related to his military service, including his reserve and discharge documents.

The conservative organization Judicial Watch filed a request for Kerry's records with the Navy under the Freedom of Information Act. The Navy provided Judicial Watch with a biographical data sheet on Kerry, two citations and one certificate for the Silver Star medal, two citations and one certificate for the Bronze Star medal, and three sets of orders and certificates for the Purple Heart. The Navy was required to withhold an additional 31 pages of personnel records because a release authorization was not provided, but referred the requester to Kerry's website which contained documents exempted from disclosure.

Kerry was attacked by SBVT and some media entities for not authorizing independent public access to his privacy protected service records. After the election, on May 20, 2005, he did sign a Standard Form 180 allowing full release of all his military service records, including his reserve and discharge records, as well as his medical records, to the Associated Press, the Boston Globe, and the Los Angeles Times. A spokesman for Kerry declined the New York Sun's request to be included on that release. The Boston Globe reported that the material largely duplicated what Kerry had released during the campaign, and included no "substantive new material".

Asked why he had declined to sign the release earlier, Kerry responded:

The call for me to sign a 180 form came from the same partisan operatives who were lying about my record on a daily basis on the Web and in the right-wing media. Even though the media was discrediting them, they continued to lie. I felt strongly that we shouldn't kowtow to them and their attempts to drag their lies out.

== Navy Inspector General report on medals ==
In September 2004, Vice Admiral Ronald A. Route, the Navy Inspector General, completed a review of Kerry's combat medals, initiated at the request of Judicial Watch. In a memo to Secretary of the Navy Gordon R. England, Route stated:

Our examination found that existing documentation regarding the Silver Star, Bronze Star and Purple Heart medals indicates the awards approval process was properly followed. In particular, the senior officers who awarded the medals were properly delegated authority to do so. In addition, we found that they correctly followed the procedures in place at the time for approving these awards. Conducting any additional review regarding events that took place over 30 years ago would not be productive. The passage of time would make reconstruction of the facts and circumstances unreliable, and would not allow the information gathered to be considered in the context of the time in which the events took place. Our review also considered the fact that Senator Kerry's post-active duty activities were public and that military and civilian officials were aware of his actions at the time. For these reasons, I have determined that Senator Kerry's awards were properly approved and will take no further action in this matter.

On September 23, 2004, Judicial Watch appealed on the basis that "no specific documentary examples were cited or offered as exhibits" in the Navy Inspector General's letter of reply. Judicial Watch also filed a Freedom of Information Act request for documentation of the investigation. On October 4, 2004 the Navy Inspector General's office responded with documentation of the investigation.

Included within the Navy Inspector General's documentation was a discussion of the duplicate medal citations Kerry had received in 1985:

[I]t is apparent that duplicate citations issued under then-Secretary Lehman's and others' signatures in June 1985 were in response to a request from Senator Kerry or his office. [T]here is considerable correspondence indicating efforts over the years to chase down various citations, etc. The citations under Secretary Lehman's name appear to have been signed by a machine, which would explain why he now doesn't recall any involvement.

In an October 5, 2004 letter to Judicial Watch, Secretary England deferred to the Navy Inspector General's authority as the investigating officer, and declined to initiate a separate review. On October 12, 2004, Judicial Watch released a press release critical of the Navy's decision that no further investigation or review would take place.

== "Swiftboating" ==
Since the 2004 election, the term "swiftboating" (or "swift boating") has become a common expression for a campaign attacking opponents by questioning their credibility and patriotism in a dishonest manner. The term is most often used with the pejorative meaning of a smear campaign.

== See also ==
- Swift Boat challenge
- George W. Bush military service controversy
