= Where's the Birth Certificate? =

2011 book by Jerome Corsi

- Author: Jerome R. Corsi
- Language: English
- Subject: Obama, Barack--Genealogy.
- Genre: Politics
- Published: May 17, 2011
- Publisher: WND Books
- Publication place: United States
- Media type: Hardcover
- Pages: 392
- ISBN: 978-1-936488-29-2
- OCLC: 698332449
- Preceded by: The Obama Nation

Where's the Birth Certificate?: The Case That Barack Obama Is Not Eligible to Be President is a book by Jerome Corsi which promotes the false claim that then U.S. President Barack Obama was not a natural-born citizen of the United States and was thus constitutionally unqualified to hold the office. The book was released on May 17, 2011, and reached No. 6 on the New York Times list of best-selling hardcover non-fiction books. It has been publicized in politically conservative venues.

The book alleges inconsistencies and fabrications in Obama's life story as well as a conspiracy and cover-up by Obama and the White House Press Office. The book says, among other things, that Obama cannot be a natural-born citizen because, as a boy, he was registered in school as a Muslim and a citizen of Indonesia. The book also alleges that Obama spent millions in legal fees to avoid having to provide a long-form birth certificate to the courts, an assertion which has been disputed by Obama supporters. Obama released his birth certificate several weeks before Where's the Birth Certificate? was published, but the book was nonetheless released unedited. The book's publisher responded to the birth certificate release by saying that Corsi was "deeply suspicious of the authenticity of this document".

== Impact and reception ==
Despite the release of Obama's long-form birth certificate on April 27, 2011, publisher Joseph Farah told The Washington Post that Where's the Birth Certificate? would not be renamed and would still be released on May 17. He said the imminent publication of the book had pressured Obama into releasing the certificate. The Boston Globe columnist Joan Vennochi opined that Obama's birth certificate was released in part to preempt Corsi's book.

Time criticized Corsi for writing a book that provided emotionally satisfying answers rather than factual ones and predicted that Where's the Birth Certificate? would still sell though Obama had released his long-form birth certificate one month before the book was to hit the shelves. Paul Harris, a foreign correspondent for The Guardian, commented that the book was nothing to be laughed at because it represented a "dangerous precedent"; the mainstreaming of a formerly extremist idea that is "palpably and stupidly misguided". Journalist Matthew Continetti, writing in The Washington Post about the earlier Corsi book Unfit for Command that swiftboated John Kerry, concluded: "The connection is important: Birtherism may be to the 2012 election what the Swift Boat Veterans for Truth were to 2004."

Martin Wisckol of the Orange County Register reported June 1, 2011, that Corsi's new book was "listed at No. 6 on The New York Times best-seller list for hardcover non-fiction" but suggested that the failure of Corsi's previous book, The Obama Nation, to derail Barack Obama's bid for the presidency was "evidence the book will not affect the upcoming election" like Unfit for Command did Kerry's presidential run four years earlier.

== Esquire lawsuit ==
Because Obama released his long-form birth certificate prior to the publication of Where's the Birth Certificate?, shortly after the book's release, a blogger for Esquire wrote a satirical article stating that the book had been recalled. On June 29, 2011, Corsi and WND Books filed a lawsuit against Esquire for damages of over US$285 million (equivalent to about $408M in 2025). In June 2012, the lawsuit was tossed out in United States district court, in a decision stating that satire is protected by the First Amendment and noting "Having become such well-known proponents of one position on the issue, plaintiffs cannot complain that the very intensity of their advocacy also became part of the public debate. Those who speak with loud voices cannot be surprised if they become part of the story." The United States Court of Appeals for the District of Columbia Circuit affirmed the dismissal.

== See also ==
- Barack Obama citizenship conspiracy theories
