= Mary Matalin =

American political consultant (born 1953)

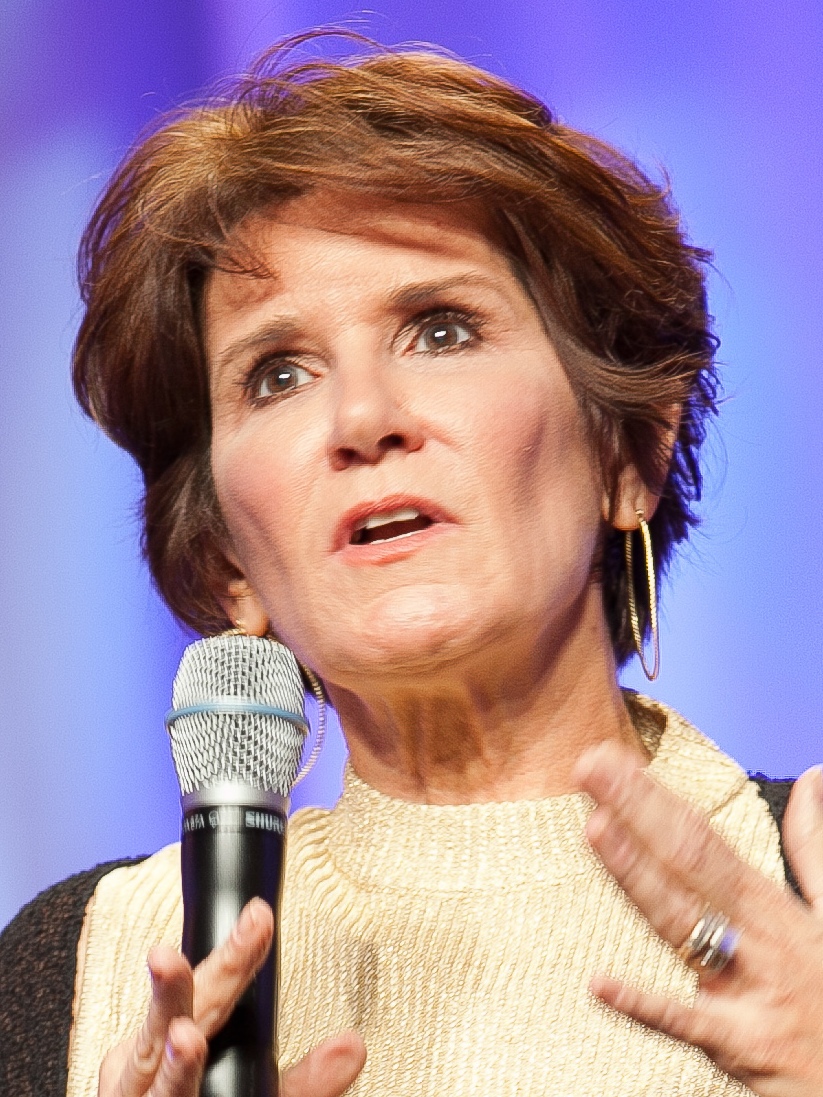
- Matalin in 2011
- Born: Mary Joe Matalin; August 19, 1953 (age 73); Burnham, Illinois, U.S.
- Education: Western Illinois University (BA); Hofstra University
- Occupation: Political consultant
- Political party: Republican (before 2016); Libertarian (since 2016)
- Spouse: James Carville (m. 1993)
- Children: 2

Mary Joe Matalin (born August 19, 1953) is an American political consultant well known for her work with the Republican Party. She served under President Ronald Reagan, was campaign director for George H. W. Bush, an assistant to President George W. Bush, and until 2003 counselor to Vice President Dick Cheney. Matalin has been chief editor of Threshold Editions, a conservative publishing imprint at Simon & Schuster, since March 2005. She is married to Democratic political consultant James Carville. She appears in the award-winning documentary film Boogie Man: The Lee Atwater Story and played herself, opposite her husband James Carville, John Slattery, and Mary McCormack in the short-lived HBO series K Street.

On May 5, 2016, Matalin announced she changed her party registration to Libertarian.

== Early life ==
Matalin grew up in the Chicago suburb of Burnham, the daughter of Eileen (née Emerson), who ran beauty salons, and Steven Matalin, a steel mill worker. Her paternal grandparents were Croatian immigrants and her mother was of Irish descent. Matalin originally intended to follow her mother into the beauty salon profession, and briefly considered becoming a model. Instead, Matalin attended Thornton Fractional North High School and attended Western Illinois University for college and Hofstra University School of Law, where she dropped out after one year.

== Career ==
Matalin's first campaign was Illinois Lieutenant Governor Dave O'Neal's bid for the U.S. Senate in 1980, a race O'Neal lost to Alan Dixon. After O'Neal's loss, Matalin began her career with the Republican National Committee, where she would remain for nearly two decades as a key Republican strategist. Leaving briefly to attend Hofstra University School of Law, Matalin dropped out after just one year, and in 1984 returned to the RNC. She rose quickly, as an aide to Richard Bond and Chief of Staff to RNC co-Chairperson Betty Heitman in 1985. A year later, Matalin gained national attention when she joined George H. W. Bush's 1988 presidential campaign, working as both Deputy Political Director and Midwest Regional Political Director in the primaries. After the election, Matalin was appointed Chief of Staff to then RNC Chairman Lee Atwater. In that capacity, she would in effect run the RNC for nearly a year, as Atwater—his health declining due to an inoperable brain tumor—spent 170 days in the hospital between his diagnosis in early March 1990 and eventual death on March 29, 1991.

In 1992, Matalin served as the deputy campaign manager for political operations on Bush's reelection campaign. Ironically, she served in this role while dating her future husband, James Carville, who was chief strategist for the Clinton campaign.

Matalin was a host of CNN's Crossfire political debate show, and in 1993, she co-hosted Equal Time, which aired on the CNBC business television channel. Matalin was also the host of her own talk radio show in the 1990s, The Mary Matalin Show, which was carried on the CBS Radio Network. She is currently on the nationally syndicated radio program Both Sides Now w/ Huffington & Matalin, hosted by Mark Green and aired weekends on 120 stations.

Matalin worked in various roles in the George W. Bush administration. She resigned on December 31, 2002.

Matalin also appeared alongside her husband James Carville in HBO's 2003 television show K Street where she and her husband played versions of themselves as they lobbied real and fictional politicians. The show was directed by Academy Award winner Steven Soderbergh and featured a cast of fictional and real characters working in the political sphere.

In March 2005, Matalin was hired as chief editor of a new conservative publishing imprint, Threshold Editions, for CBS-owned Simon & Schuster. On August 1, 2008, this division released The Obama Nation, written by Jerome Corsi, who co-authored Unfit for Command: Swift Boat Veterans Speak Out Against John Kerry. Other notable titles published by Threshold Editions includes Dick Cheney's In My Time, Karl Rove's Courage and Consequence and a number of Glenn Beck books including Cowards, and Broke.

In April 2006, she was appointed Treasurer of Virginia Republican Senator George Allen's re-election committee. She worked on the presidential campaign of Fred Thompson until January 2008, when Thompson dropped out of the race.

In 2008, Matalin joined the Board of Directors at The George Washington University's Cheney Cardiovascular Institute. Matalin also serves on numerous other boards including The Water Institute of the Gulf (TWIG), Conscience Cause, The New Orleans Jazz Orchestra (NOJO) and the Tulane President's Council.

Matalin appears in the 2008 award-winning documentary on Lee Atwater, Boogie Man: The Lee Atwater Story. Speaking about Lee, she says, "They had to kill the messenger because they couldn't kill the message. They had to turn him into the Boogie Man. Satan incarnate."

On April 26, 2009, Matalin returned to CNN as a political contributor, joining her husband, James Carville on a special "First 100 Days" edition of State of the Union with John King.

In 2010, Matalin and husband James Carville were named co-chairs of Super Bowl XLVII Host Committee, held in 2013 in New Orleans.

In 2012, Matalin and husband Carville began appearing together in "Cocktail Party" commercials for Maker's Mark Kentucky Straight Bourbon.

Believing that farm animals should be treated humanely, Matalin teamed up with PETA to produce a video in 2013, encouraging Indiana lawmakers to vote against "ag-gag" bills that would ban unapproved videotaping on farms and businesses.

On May 5, 2016, Matalin announced that she had changed her party registration to Libertarian, as that party represents her "Jeffersonian, Madisonian [...] constitutional principles" better than the Republican Party, after the GOP lost two successive presidential elections and was "falling apart." While maintaining the change was not because of Donald Trump becoming the presumptive Republican nominee, she criticized Trump for "his high school boy antics with women." Matalin said she is a 'provisional Trumpster' and likes Trump’s “attitude” and “strategic chutzpah.”

She endorsed Austin Petersen for president in May 2016.

She was named PETA's "Person of the Year" in December 2016. The organization cited her willingness to fight for the humane treatment of monkeys and farm animals, and "for setting a tremendous example of compassion that all Americans can follow."

== Personal life ==
On November 25, 1993 (Thanksgiving Day), Matalin married James Carville, a political strategist for candidates of the Democratic Party, in New Orleans. They have two daughters.

Matalin and Carville have gone on record saying they do not talk politics at home. The best example of contention between the two, aside from appearances on talk shows, is the portrayal of their relationship in the 1993 movie The War Room. In the 1992 political campaign, Matalin and Carville were staffing opposing campaigns. Matalin wrote the best-selling book All's Fair: Love, War and Running for President with Carville and co-author Peter Knobler. In April 2004, she published the book Letters to My Daughters. In 2008, Carville and Matalin moved their family to New Orleans. On April 26, 2009, The Times-Picayune carried a joint op-ed "Point of View" by Matalin and Carville on their reasons for settling in New Orleans. Matalin and Carville are profiled in the Politics chapter of the book The Compatibility Matrix.

== In popular culture ==
In the 2018 film Vice, Matalin is portrayed by Camille Harman.
