= The Obama Nation =

Book by Jerome Corsi

The Obama Nation: Leftist Politics and the Cult of Personality
- Author: Jerome Corsi
- Language: English
- Subject: Barack Obama, early life and career of Barack Obama, Barack Obama presidential campaign, 2008
- Publisher: Threshold Editions, an imprint of Simon & Schuster
- Publication date: August 1, 2008
- Publication place: United States
- Media type: Print (Hardcover)
- Pages: 384
- ISBN: 1-4165-9806-5
- OCLC: 243941633
- Dewey Decimal: 328.73092 B 22
- LC Class: E901.1.O23 C67 2008
- Followed by: Where's the Birth Certificate?: The Case that Barack Obama is not Eligible to be President

The Obama Nation: Leftist Politics and the Cult of Personality is a book by Jerome Corsi opposing Barack Obama's candidacy for President of the United States. The book alleges Obama's "extreme leftism", "extensive connections with Islam and radical politics", "naïve... foreign policy", past drug use and connections to corrupt backers, among other things. The book has been criticized for containing factual errors, for being racist, and for being a political "attack book" containing smears, falsehoods, and innuendo.

== Content ==
Corsi said his purpose in writing the book was to defeat Obama in the 2008 United States presidential election. In the book, he recounts Barack Obama's upbringing and early political career in Chicago and argues that Obama is an "extreme leftist" who should not be elected president. The book claims to document "Obama's extensive connections with Islam and radical politics", his "religious affiliation with ... black-liberation theology", and his associations with controversial pastor Jeremiah Wright, fundraiser Tony Rezko, and radical activists Bill Ayers and Bernardine Dohrn, formerly of the Weather Underground. The book also argues that Obama supports "far-left domestic policy" and "naïve... foreign policy predicated on the reduction of the military", and that he is therefore unsuitable to be the President of the United States.

The book opens with a quote by Andy Martin, who The Nation, The Washington Post, and The New York Times have identified as the primary source for the allegations that Obama is concealing an alleged Muslim faith, rumors which began shortly after his keynote speech at the 2004 Democratic National Convention.

== Author and publication ==
The book's author, Jerome Corsi, has written on a number of controversial topics. In 2007 he wrote a book exposing a supposed plot to replace the United States dollar with international currency. He accused a "Muslim terrorist group" of supporting John McCain, and called for the impeachment of George W. Bush. He endorsed the 9/11 Truth Movement, which questions official and mainstream accounts of the September 11, 2001 attacks. During the 2004 United States presidential election, he co-wrote Unfit for Command, a book associated with Swift Vets and POWs for Truth that was critical of Democratic candidate John Kerry. He is a regular contributor at conservative internet publication WorldNetDaily, which is well known for publicizing conspiracy theories about Obama's citizenship.

The book was published by Threshold Editions, a division of CBS-owned Simon & Schuster, whose chief editor was Republican Party political strategist Mary Matalin. The title is intentionally assonant with abomination.

Corsi was detained by Kenyan immigration officials and then deported for attempting to promote the book without a work permit.

== Responses ==
=== Obama campaign response ===
In response to the book, the Obama campaign issued a 40-page response, "unfit for publication" (playing on the Corsi co-authored 2004 book Unfit for Command) on the campaign website fightthesmears.com, objecting to assertions made in the book and alleging factual errors. The campaign also issued a press release, reading in part:

This book is nothing but a series of lies that were long ago discredited, written by an individual who was discredited after he wrote a similar book to help George Bush and Dick Cheney get re-elected four years ago... The reality is that there are many lie-filled books like this in the works cobbled together from the Internet to make money off of a presidential campaign... We will respond to these smears forcefully.

The Obama campaign also said it would "push back against this year's vicious Republican attack book." In addition, the Democratic National Committee joined the "counteroffensive" telling its supporters by email: "The media have shown that they aren't going to stop him. It's up to you to spread the truth, so here it is. Below you will find the facts about Corsi and his desperate fabrications."

=== Other responses ===
When asked for a comment about the book, John McCain said, "Gotta keep your sense of humor," but his campaign said McCain did not hear the question, and the campaign had no comment. In response to the book's publication, Senator John Kerry, the subject of a previous book by Corsi during his 2004 campaign for presidency, launched the website "Truth Fights Back" to rebut the claims. Media Matters for America, which describes itself as a progressive organization dedicated to countering "conservative misinformation in the U.S. media", has given details of what it says are numerous instances of inaccuracies in the book and in Corsi's statements promoting the work. Paul Waldman of Media Matters appeared with Corsi on Larry King Live when they discussed the claims. MSNBC's Contessa Brewer confronted Corsi with these alleged inaccuracies; Corsi disputed Media Matters' allegations.

== Reception and critical review ==
Released on August 1, 2008, the book was #4 in sales in nonfiction during the first week of its release and subsequently rose to #1 on the New York Times Best Seller list for hardcover non-fiction books within two weeks, due in part to higher bulk sales. This has led some Obama supporters to suspect that conservative groups have made bulk purchases to inflate sales, something Corsi denies. On September, 8 it was second to Tori Spelling's book. Corsi posted his first Obamabucks from the sale of his book on the wall of a coffee shop in Washington.

Corsi's book has been criticized for inaccuracies by news organizations such as The New York Times, the Los Angeles Times, U.S. News & World Report, the Associated Press, Time magazine, Newsweek, The Daily Telegraph, Editor & Publisher, The Guardian, CNN, The Independent, Politifact.com, and The Boston Globe. According to The New York Times, "several of the book's accusations, in fact, are unsubstantiated, misleading or inaccurate." Peter Wehner of Commentary wrote: "conservatives should not hitch their hopes to" Corsi's book because "it seems to be riddled with factual errors — some relatively minor (like asserting that Obama does not mention the birth of his half-sister, Maya Soetoro-Ng, in Dreams from My Father; Obama does mention her), and some significant (suggesting that Obama favors withdrawing troops from Afghanistan; he wants to do the opposite)."

The Washington Post called it an "innuendo-filled, mistake-riddled biography" in its online election diary The Trail. Kate Linthicum of the Los Angeles Times wrote "being No. 1 [on the best seller list] doesn't necessarily mean being accurate" in regard to Corsi's claims about Obama's religious faith. Politico reported that Corsi's book "left a trail of wild theories, vitriol and dogma that have called into question his credibility." The British newspaper The Independent called Corsi's book "a hatchet job on Obama". According to Slate, "neither Corsi nor Matalin responded to e-mails from me asking whether they intended to correct any errors in The Obama Nation – it would be a miracle if there were none" [emphasis in original].

The book also contains what The Washington Post describes as "potentially offensive passages" about Barack Obama's personal and family life, such as one stating that Obama is less identified with his American roots than his "African blood". Corsi also writes: "Obama's mother chose another Third World prospect for her second husband, a second man of color, to be her mate", noted by CNN as "lines some might consider racially insensitive." The Los Angeles Times also pointed to a line by Corsi claiming "Obama wants to will all the white blood out of himself so he can become pure black," citing "bigoted comments." The Chicago Sun-Times called it "an abomination," and said the book "exploits racial fears [and] hate in [an] effort to scare white America." Corsi has drawn criticism for scheduling an appearance to promote the book on The Political Cesspool, a "pro-White" radio talk show described as "white nationalist" by the Southern Poverty Law Center. He previously appeared on the show on July 20, but he cancelled his August 17 appearance, citing a change of "travel plans."

=== Disputed accuracy ===
The New York Times noted the book's assertion that Obama attended an incendiary sermon by the Rev. Jeremiah Wright in Chicago on a date when Obama was in fact giving a speech in Florida. The article further noted Corsi's assertion that Obama had "yet to answer" if he had stopped using drugs. The State Journal-Register of Springfield, Illinois reported Obama's response to a question about his drug use: "I haven't done anything since I was 20 years old." Corsi told the Times that "self-reporting, by people who have used drugs, as to when they stopped is inherently unreliable." (Obama has also answered the question in the autobiography that Corsi reviews in his book.) In the book, Corsi says that Obama may still be using drugs today, but does not provide evidence for this claim.

The Times further noted that while Obama is a Christian, the book contains statements arguing that he has "extensive connections to Islam". One of Corsi's statements is that Obama's childhood friend, Zulfin Adi, had stated that Obama was a practicing Muslim. Contradicting that, Kim Barker, a foreign correspondent for the Chicago Tribune reported: "Interviews with dozens of former classmates, teachers, neighbors and friends show that Obama was not a regular practicing Muslim when he was in Indonesia". Corsi also fails to reveal that Adi later said he couldn't be certain about his claims and confessed to knowing Obama for only a few months.

Corsi provided the wrong date of the Obamas' marriage, according to the Obama campaign.

When discussing the house Barack and Michelle Obama bought in 2005, Corsi cites a February 1, 2008 Salon.com article for the claim that Chicago businessman Tony Rezko "found the house for Obama." In a 2007 interview with the staff of the Chicago Sun-Times, Barack Obama asserted that it was his wife who found the house.

FactCheck described the book as "a mishmash of unsupported conjecture, half-truths, logical fallacies and outright falsehoods." FactCheck's review also stated that, "A comprehensive review of all the false claims in Corsi's book would itself be a book."

== See also ==
- Swiftboating
