= Military career of John Kerry =

The military career of John Kerry occurred during the Vietnam War. Kerry served as a lieutenant in the United States Navy during the period from 1966 to 1970. His only tour in Vietnam was four months as officer in charge of a Swift boat in 1969. Kerry received several combat medals during this tour, including the Silver Star, Bronze Star, and three Purple Hearts. Kerry's military record received considerable attention during his political career, especially during his unsuccessful 2004 bid for the presidency.

== Commission and training ==
On February 18, 1966, John Kerry enlisted in the U.S. Naval Reserve. He began his active duty military service on August 19, 1966. After completing sixteen weeks of Officer Candidate School at the U.S. Naval Training Center in Newport, Rhode Island, he received his commission on December 16, 1966.

On January 3, 1967, Kerry began a ten-week Officer Damage Control Course at the Naval Schools Command on Treasure Island, California. On March 22, 1967, he reported to the U.S. Fleet Anti-Air Warfare Training Center for training as a Combat Information Center Watch Officer.

== Tour of duty on the USS Gridley ==
Kerry's first tour of duty was as an ensign on the guided missile frigate USS Gridley, beginning June 8, 1967. On February 9, 1968, the Gridley set sail for a Western Pacific deployment. The next day, Kerry requested duty in Vietnam, listing as his first preference a position as the commander of a Fast Patrol Craft (PCF), also known as a "Swift boat." These 50-foot boats have aluminum hulls and have little or no armor, but are heavily armed and rely on speed. "I didn't really want to get involved in the war," Kerry said in a book of Vietnam reminiscences published in 1986. "When I signed up for the swift boats, they had very little to do with the war. They were engaged in coastal patrolling and that's what I thought I was going to be doing." However, Kerry's second choice of billet was in a river patrol boat, or PBR, squadron, which at the time was performing the more dangerous river duty.

The Gridley traveled to several places, including Wellington in New Zealand, Subic Bay in the Philippines, and the Gulf of Tonkin off North Vietnam. The executive officer of the Gridley has described the deployment: "We deployed from San Diego to the Vietnam theatre in early 1968 after only a six-month turnaround and spent most of a four-month deployment on rescue station in the Gulf of Tonkin, standing by to pick up downed aviators. It was a fairly grueling tour of duty. Our helicopter was shot up trying to rescue a downed pilot and the door gunner was killed. The crew performed well and John Kerry's performance in all aspects of his duty was outstanding." The ship departed for the U.S. on May 27, 1968, and returned to port at Long Beach, California on June 6. Ten days after returning, on June 16, Kerry was promoted to the rank of Lieutenant, junior grade. On June 20, he left the Gridley for special Swift boat training at the Naval Amphibious Base in Coronado, California.

== Commander of a Swift boat ==
On November 17, 1968, Kerry reported for duty at Coastal Squadron 1 in Cam Ranh Bay in South Vietnam. Kerry took part in Operation Sea Lords, the brainchild of Admiral Elmo Zumwalt. The goal was to project a U.S. military presence more aggressively into an area that had long been a Viet Cong stronghold. As part of that plan, the Swift boats were assigned to patrol the narrow waterways — inlets, canals, and coves — of the Mekong River delta, to monitor enemy movements, interdict enemy river-based supply lines, invite attack and otherwise draw out hostile forces.

During his tour of duty as an Officer in Charge of Swift boats, Kerry led five-man crews on patrols into enemy-controlled areas. His first command was Swift boat PCF-44, from December 6, 1968, to January 21, 1969, when the crew was disbanded. The crew was based at Coastal Division 13 at Cat Lo from December 13 to January 6. Otherwise, it was stationed at Coastal Division 11 at An Thoi. On January 30, Kerry took charge of PCF-94 and its crew, which he led until he departed An Thoi on March 26 and the crew was disbanded.

=== First Purple Heart ===
During the night of December 2, 1968 and early morning of December 3, Kerry was in charge of a small boat operating in and around a peninsula north of Cam Ranh Bay together with a Swift boat (PCF-60). Kerry's boat surprised a group of men unloading sampans at a river crossing, who began to run. When the men refused to obey an order to stop running, Kerry and his crew of two enlisted men opened fire, destroyed the sampans, and took off. During this encounter, Kerry suffered a wound from a small piece of shrapnel in the left arm above the elbow.

Dr. Louis Letson, a member of the anti-Kerry group Swift Boat Veterans for Truth (SBVT), claimed to have treated Kerry for this wound, but the sick bay report is signed by medical corpsman J.C. Carreon. According to Letson's account and the sick bay report, shrapnel was removed and the wounded area was treated with bacitracin antibiotic and bandaged. Kerry returned to duty the next day on a regular Swift boat patrol. Kerry was later awarded his first Purple Heart for this injury.

Kerry's opponents, including the SBVT, have contended that this wound was too minor to merit a Purple Heart. However, guidelines for a Purple Heart do not distinguish between degrees of injury; in addition, a 2004 review by the Navy inspector general concluded that Kerry's awards, including his first Purple Heart, were properly approved.

=== Meeting with Zumwalt and Abrams ===
At the time, the U.S. military command in Vietnam had an established policy of "free-fire zones": areas in which soldiers were to shoot anyone moving around after curfew, without first making sure that they were hostile. Such encounters could result in the deaths of innocent civilians. Kerry has stated that he never thought he or his crew were at fault: "There wasn't anybody in that area that didn't know you don't move at night, that you don't go out in a sampan on the rivers, and there's a curfew." Nevertheless, he soon concluded that the policy should be changed.

On January 22, 1969, Kerry and several other officers had an unusual meeting in Saigon with Admiral Elmo Zumwalt, the commander of U.S. Naval forces in Vietnam, and U.S. Army General Creighton Abrams, the overall commander of U.S. forces in Vietnam. Kerry and the other officers reported that the "free-fire" policy was alienating the Vietnamese and that the Swift boats' actions were not accomplishing their ostensible goal of interdicting Viet Cong supply lines. According to some who retell the story, Kerry and the other visiting officers' concerns were dismissed with what amounted to a pep talk. One of the other officers who participated later recalled, "We all looked at each other and thought, 'What is this crap?'" Kerry later said that the Saigon meeting left him "more depressed than when I came."

=== Second Purple Heart ===
Kerry received his second Purple Heart for action on the Bo De River on February 20, 1969. The plan had been for the Swift boats to be accompanied by support helicopters. On the way up the Bo De, however, the helicopters were attacked. They returned to their base to refuel and were unable to return to the mission for several hours. Kerry recorded the situation in his notebook: "We therefore had a choice: to wait for what was not a confirmed return by the helos [and] give any snipers more time to set up an ambush for our exit or we could take a chance and exit immediately without any cover. We chose the latter."

As the Swift boats reached the Cua Lon River, Kerry's boat was hit by a rocket-propelled grenade round, and a piece of shrapnel hit Kerry's left leg. Thereafter, they had no more trouble, and reached the Gulf of Thailand safely. Kerry still has shrapnel in his left thigh because the doctors tending to him decided to remove the damaged tissue and close the wound with sutures rather than make a wide opening to remove the shrapnel. Kerry received his second Purple Heart for this injury, but he did not take any time off from duty.

=== Silver Star ===
Only eight days later, on February 28, came the incident for which Kerry was awarded the Silver Star. On this occasion, Kerry was in tactical command of his Swift boat and two others. Their mission included bringing a demolition team and dozens of South Vietnamese soldiers to destroy enemy sampans, structures and bunkers. Along the Bay Hap River, they ran into an ambush. Kerry directed the boats "to turn to the beach and charge the Viet Cong positions" and he "expertly directed" his boat's fire and coordinated the deployment of the South Vietnamese troops, according to Admiral Zumwalt's original medal citation.

After the South Vietnamese troops and an accompanying team of three U.S. Army advisors had disembarked at the ambush site, Kerry's boat and another headed up river to look for the fleeing enemy. The two boats came under fire from a Viet Cong B-40 rocket-propelled grenade, shattering the crew cabin windows of PCF-94. Kerry ordered the boats to turn and charge the second ambush site. As they reached the shore, a Viet Cong soldier jumped out of the brush, carrying a loaded B-40 launcher. With the enemy soldier only a short distance away from the boat and crew, forward gunner Tommy Belodeau shot him in the leg with the boat's 7.62×51mm caliber M-60 machine gun. "Tommy in the pit tank winged him in the side of the legs as he was coming across," Fred Short said. "But the guy didn't miss a stride. I mean, he did not break stride." Belodeau's machine gun jammed after he fired, and while crewmate Michael Medeiros attempted to fire, he was unable to do so. Kerry leaped ashore and, followed by Medeiros, pursued the man and killed him. The medal citation notes that Kerry "then led an assault party and conducted a sweep of the area" until the enemy had "been completely routed." The mission was judged highly successful for having destroyed numerous targets and confiscated substantial combat supplies while sustaining no casualties.

Kerry's commanding officer, Lieutenant George Elliott, joked that he didn't know whether to court-martial him for beaching the boat without orders or give him a medal for saving the crew. Elliott recommended Kerry for the Silver Star, and Zumwalt flew into An Thoi to personally award medals to Kerry and the rest of the sailors involved in the mission. The Navy's account of Kerry's actions is presented in the original medal citation signed by Zumwalt. In addition, the after-action reports for this mission are available, along with the original press release written on March 1, a historical summary dated March 17, and more.

Sources close to Kerry say the incident had a profound effect on him: "It's the reason he gets so angry when his patriotism is challenged. It was a traumatic experience that's still with him, and he went through it for his country." It affects the way Kerry lives his life every day, the source said, since "he knows he very well would not be alive today had he not taken the life of another man [he] never ever met."

=== Bronze Star and third Purple Heart ===
On March 13, five Swift Boats were returning to base together on the Bay Hap River from their missions that day. A mine detonated directly beneath one of the boats (PCF-3), lifting it into the air. Shortly thereafter, another mine exploded near Kerry's boat (PCF-94). James Rassmann, a Green Beret advisor who was sitting on the deck of the pilothouse eating a cookie, was knocked overboard. Just afterwards, the boat came under attack from both sides of the bank. Rassmann dived to the bottom of the river. Repeatedly, when he came back up for air, the enemy fired at him. Rassmann was heading to the north bank, expecting to be taken prisoner, when Kerry realized he was gone and came back for him.

The Navy's account of Kerry's actions is presented in his medal citation:

Lt. Kerry directed his gunners to provide suppressing fire, while from an exposed position on the bow, his arm bleeding and in pain, with disregard for his personal safety, he pulled the man aboard. Lt. Kerry then directed his boat to return and assist the other damaged craft and towed the boat to safety. Lt. Kerry's calmness, professionalism and great personal courage under fire were in keeping with the highest traditions of the US Naval Service. (Wikisource)

PCF-94 received special recognition from Captain Roy Hoffmann, the commander of Task Force 115 (which included Coastal Division 11), on March 14 in his weekly report to his men:

Special recognition is due to the following unit this week, for exceptional performance: To PCF 94 for providing extraordinary assistance to PCF 3 which was seriously damaged by a mine explosion while proceeding down the Bay Hap [River]. PCF 94 picked up the MSF advisor out of the water and towed PCF 3 out of the danger area. PCF 43, 51, and 23 all assisted in suppression of automatic weapons and small arms fire, evacuation of wounded in action, and damage control effort on PCF 3.

After the dazed and injured crew of PCF-3 had been rescued, PCFs 43 and 23 left the scene to evacuate the four most seriously wounded sailors. PCFs 51 and 94 remained behind and helped salvage the stricken boat together with a damage-control party that had been immediately dispatched to the scene.

Kerry was slightly injured earlier in the day by shrapnel from a grenade tossed into a rice bin; he received contusions on his right forearm from hitting the bulkhead when the mine exploded near his boat during the later action. He received his third Purple Heart at this time.

== Return from Vietnam ==
On March 17, 1969, shortly after Kerry's third wound, Commodore Charles Horne, the commander of Coastal Squadron 1, filed for Kerry's reassignment to the U.S. per Kerry's request. He was entitled to this early departure from Vietnam (subject to approval by the Bureau of Naval Personnel), because those who had been wounded three times, "regardless of the nature of the wound or treatment required ... will not be ordered to serve in Vietnam and contiguous waters or to duty with ships or units which have been alerted for movement to that area." According to the Navy regulation that governed this (BUPERS Instruction 1300.39), the request for the "thrice-wounded reassignment" was optional at the request of the wounded party and required requesting reassignment. Kerry requested reassignment and was granted his request.

On March 26, after a final patrol at night on March 25, Kerry was transferred to Cam Ranh Bay to await his orders. He was there for five or six days and left Vietnam in early April. On April 11, he reported to the Brooklyn-based Atlantic Military Sea Transportation Service, where he would remain on active duty for the following year as a personal aide to an officer, Rear Admiral Walter Schlech. On January 1, 1970, Kerry was promoted to full Lieutenant; on January 3, he requested discharge. He was released from active duty on March 1.

All told, John Kerry was on active duty in the U.S. Navy for three years and eight months, from August 1966 until March 1970. He continued to serve in the Navy Reserves until February, 1978. He lost five close friends in the war, including Yale classmate Richard Pershing, who was killed in action on February 17, 1968.

Silver Star Medal		Bronze Star Medal with Combat "V"
Purple Heart Medal with two Stars	Combat Action Ribbon	Naval Presidential Unit Citation
Navy Meritorious Unit Commendation	National Defense Service Medal	Vietnam Service Medal with two stars
Navy Rifle Marksmanship Ribbon	Navy Pistol Marksmanship Ribbon	Republic of Vietnam Campaign Medal with 1960- device

== Honorable discharge ==
On November 21, 1969, Kerry requested an early release from active duty in order to become a candidate for Congress. The request was approved and he was released from active duty effective January 3, 1970, and transferred to the Ready Reserve (inactive). On March 1, 1972, the Navy offered Kerry the option of executing a written request to remain in the Ready Reserve or automatically being transferred to the Standby Reserve - Inactive; Kerry was subsequently transferred to the Standby Reserve - Inactive effective July 1, 1972. Kerry had no obligation to attend drills or contact the Navy other than to keep his address current.

On February 16, 1978, Kerry received an "Honorable Discharge from the U.S. Naval Reserve," pursuant to former Section 1162 of Title 10 of the U.S. Code and "in accordance with the approved recommendations of a board of officers convened under the authority of [former] Section 1163 of Title 10 of the U.S. Code to examine the official records of officers of the Naval Reserve on inactive duty and determine whether they should be retained on the rolls of the Reserve Component or separated from the naval service pursuant to the Secretarial instructions promulgated in [former] BUPERSMAN 3830300".

With respect to Kerry's discharge from the Naval Reserve, Rowan Scarborough of the Washington Times wrote:

"A second charge is that Mr. Kerry did not successfully fulfill his time in the Reserves, so a special board had to be convened to determine what type of discharge he should receive.

Navy documents show that in 1978, he received an "honorable discharge certificate" after a board of officers convened and reviewed his record.

Navy officials say today that the board was standard operating procedure at that time for all reservists and does not indicate Mr. Kerry did anything wrong.

After service just short of four years on active duty, Mr. Kerry transferred to the Ready Reserve and then in 1972 to the standby Reserve.

He was not required to attend drills under those two designations, says a Navy official who asked not to be named.The controversy remains active however, because Kerry's discharge was issued years after Kerry's reserve obligation ended, and occurred during the time of President Jimmy Carter's blanket amnesty and discharge upgrade program for Vietnam-era veterans who were discharged under less-than-honorable conditions for misconduct. Additionally, the discharge was processed by a Naval Board of Review, a procedure only utilized to upgrade less-than-honorable discharges, so the fact that Kerry's discharge went through such a process shows that it was a proverbial "fresh coat of paint," over a bad discharge, according to veterans. Detractors contend that Kerry's ties to his fellow liberal political ally, then-President Carter, was behind the upgraded discharge. Carter was very sympathetic to the anti-war movement and had pardoned US deserters and draft-dodgers. Thus, he was suspected to have ordered an upgrading of the discharge. Otherwise, Kerry would have remained on record as a non-honorably discharged veteran. "

== Criticism of military service and awards ==
Critics have questioned several aspects of Kerry's military service. As the presidential campaign of 2004 developed, around 200 Vietnam-era veterans formed the group Swift Boat Veterans for Truth (SBVT) and held press conferences, ran ads (financed in part by a major Republican party donor in Texas) and endorsed a book, Unfit for Command, questioning Kerry's service record and military awards. Several SBVT members were in the same unit as Kerry. SBVT member Stephen Gardner served on the same boat. Other SBVT members included two of Kerry's former commanding officers, Grant Hibbard and George Elliott. Hibbard and Elliott have alleged, respectively, that Kerry's first Purple Heart and Silver Star were undeserved. In addition, members of SBVT have questioned his other medals and his truthfulness in testimony about the war. Defenders of John Kerry's war record, who include nine of the ten living crewmen who served under him, have charged that organizers of SBVT had close ties to the Bush presidential campaign and that the accusations were false and politically motivated.
