= Hot House Flowers (disambiguation) =

Hot House Flowers may refer to:

- Hot House Flowers, a children's book by John H. Wilson
- Hot House Flowers (album), 1984 album by Wynton Marsalis
- Hothouse Flowers, an Irish rock group
