= HDMK =

HDMK is an American strategic communication lobbying firm based in Washington, D.C., whose partners were originally four Republican communication professionals: Terry Holt, Trent Duffy, Jim Morrell and Chad Kolton.

The group aided the Special Operations OPSEC Education Fund.

In 2013, the firm was reorganized. Morrell and Kolton quit, while Democratic operative Mike Hacker became partner.
