= Chad Kolton =

American executive

Chad Kolton is a co-founder and Managing Partner of Blueprint Communications. He had previously co-founded and worked as a partner in the American public relations firm HDMK. Through that role he was also a hired spokesperson for Special Operations OPSEC Education Fund.

He lived in Moscow from 1998 to 2000 as program director for the International Republican Institute, which promotes democratic values. He later worked as public affairs chief for the Federal Emergency Management Agency (FEMA). From 2003 through 2005 he was press secretary for the Office of Management and Budget.

In March 2005, Cassidy & Associates selected him to be senior vice president in charge of their new strategic communications practice.

In August 2006, Kolton returned to his work in the Bush administration as a spokesperson for the Director of National Intelligence. Kolton was credited with making the DNI's office more accessible to journalists, such as by providing regular off-the-record briefings by senior analysts on global hotspots. He left that position in June 2007.

He would later become a spokesperson the Federal Bureau of Investigation's Terrorist Screening Center, before again returning to the private sector in 2010.
