= Special Operations OPSEC Education Fund =

American political organization

Special Operations OPSEC Education Fund Inc
- Abbreviation: OPSEC
- Formation: 2012
- Headquarters: Alexandria, Virginia
- President: Scott Taylor
- Spokesperson: Chad Kolton
- Spokesperson: Ben Smith
- Website: www.opsecteam.org

Special Operations OPSEC Education Fund, Inc. (OPSEC) is a 501(c)(4) organization formed in the United States in 2012 to conduct a media campaign critical of President Barack Obama by accusing his administration of disclosing sensitive information about the killing of Osama bin Laden and taking too much credit for the operation. In response, the Obama Campaign compared the organization's efforts to the "Swift Boat" attacks against Democratic presidential candidate John Kerry in 2004.

The military portmanteau "OPSEC" is shorthand for operations security, wherein security measures are taken to prevent friendly operations and intentions from being observed by an adversary's intelligence systems. OPSEC, Inc. states that its members are primarily former U.S. special operations forces and intelligence community personnel. The group has extensive ties to the Republican Party and Tea Party movement, though it describes itself as non-partisan. As a 501(c)(4) organization, the group is not required to disclose its donors and it has declined to do so.

== Leadership and funding ==
OPSEC's president is Scott Taylor, a former Navy SEAL and former U.S. Congressman from Virginia. Its lead spokesperson and former SEAL, Ben Smith, was also a spokesperson for Tea Party Express. Another spokesperson is Chad Kolton, who worked for the Bush administration as a spokesperson for the Director of National Intelligence, and who was hired to perform media relations for OPSEC in July 2012 through HDMK, a Republican strategic communications firm. Public records filed with authorities indicate the group's treasurer, lawyer and television producers also have affiliations with Republican Party organizations.

OPSEC registered with the Internal Revenue Service as a 501(c)(4) social welfare organization. Unlike 501(c)(3) organizations, 501(c)(4) organizations can participate in partisan politics. The group is not required to disclose its donors and OPSEC has declined to reveal them. In 2012, the group said that it had raised almost $1 million in donations.

== Dishonorable Disclosures ==
Dishonorable Disclosures
- Release date: August 15, 2012
- Running time: 22 minutes
- Country: United States
- Language: English

On August 15, 2012, the group launched its criticism campaign of President Obama by promoting a 22-minute documentary style web video hosted on the organization's website and on YouTube entitled "Dishonorable Disclosures". The group announced they were planning on showing it in a handful of voting swing states, including Virginia, Colorado, Florida, Ohio, North Carolina, and Nevada. According to The New York Times, the video portrayed Obama "as a braggart taking credit for the accomplishments of special forces and intelligence operatives". Using interviews with a handful of former special forces and intelligence personnel, it accused the Obama Administration of leaking information and taking too much credit for killing bin Laden. The interviewees alleged that the administration intentionally leaked details about the raid on bin Laden's compound that would help terrorists identify the Navy SEALs involved.

Ben Smith, identified in the video as a former SEAL, is seen saying, "Mr. President, you did not kill Osama bin Laden, America did. The work that the American military has done killed Osama bin Laden. You did not." Fred Rustmann, identified in the video as a retired CIA officer, alleged that Hollywood elites were invited to the White House to be briefed on how the raid took place, and that the administration leaked "what kind of sources we had, what kind of methods we used, all for the purpose of making a Hollywood movie", referring to the film Zero Dark Thirty. Bill Cowan, identified as a retired lieutenant colonel, also alleged that President Obama divulged covert information to Hollywood, saying in the video "When we divulge national security information such as the identity of the organization that killed Osama bin Laden, we have now put all of those men, all of their families, everybody around them at some sort of risk."

=== Reception ===
Peter Bergen, author of Man Hunt: The Ten Year Search for Bin Laden From 9/11 to Abbottabad, wrote a critical analysis of Dishonorable Disclosures. Bergen wrote that what precipitated the operation going public was not Obama's announcement of the raid but the crash of the Black Hawk helicopter and the arrival of Pakistani journalists at bin Laden's Abbottabad compound soon afterward. Bergen added that U.S. Adm. Mike Mullen had advised Obama that Pakistan's top military officer, Gen. Ashfaq Parvez Kayani, had asked for the U.S. to go public, persuading Obama to announce the raid sooner than was planned although Obama had initially preferred to wait for 100% DNA confirmation of bin Laden's death. Bergen noted that Obama's speech did not divulge the name of SEAL Team Six, instead saying that a "small team of Americans carried out the operation with extraordinary courage and capability." Bergen wrote that as discussed in multiple news stories, SEALs are the principal Special Operations Forces in the Afghanistan/Pakistan theater, and that "obviously, a mission to take out bin Laden would not be entrusted to any other than these elite units" (referring to SEALs and Delta Force), adding that it remained unclear who first leaked the involvement of SEAL Team Six. Bergen also wrote it was "just plain wrong" that anyone in the U.S. government leaked the name of Dr Shakil Afridi, writing that this information first surfaced in The Guardian in July 2011 after Afridi was arrested by the Pakistani intelligence service. Bergen also wrote that it was entirely Obama's decision, made against the advice of both the vice president and secretary of defense, to launch the raid based on fragmentary intelligence that bin Laden might be there. Bergen also wrote that the United States' use of drones in Pakistan "is one of the world's worst kept secrets," that disclosure of the Stuxnet virus attacks on the Iranian nuclear program had been reported since 2010, and that Iran publicly acknowledged the cyberattack two years earlier.

Elizabeth Flock of US News questioned the group's claims to be non-partisan noting that "its ranks are filled with Republicans" and stating that OPSEC "has clearly taken a political side". News reports have described the group's ties to the Republican Party, noting that several prominent leaders of the group are Republicans and Tea Partiers and that it shares an office with a Republican consulting firm and a Republican polling firm. While the group described itself as nonpartisan, some of its leaders have been involved in Republican campaigns and Tea Party groups. The film's featured former SEAL members include one whose Facebook page identifies him as a spokesman for the Tea Party Express and several Republican campaigns, and OPSEC's president Scott Taylor ran unsuccessfully as a Republican candidate for Congress in 2010. In a 2012 interview with The New York Times, Taylor acknowledged the Republican ties of some members but said that "as many or more (of the film's participants) are apolitical." While the film portrayed President Obama as a "braggart taking credit for the accomplishments of special forces and intelligence operatives," during the video clip of Obama announcing the killing of Osama bin Laden, the portion in which Obama credited the "tireless and heroic work of our military and our counterterrorism professionals" was deleted by the filmmakers. In a CNN interview in 2012, Admiral William H. McRaven, a former commander of United States Special Operations Command, said that Obama "shouldered the burden" for the operation, "made the hard decisions," and was "instrumental in the planning process."

The Obama campaign compared it to the discredited "swift boat" smear tactics used against presidential nominee John Kerry in 2004. A spokesperson said, "No one in this group is in a position to speak with any authority on these issues and on what impact any leaks may have had, and it's clear they've resorted to making things up for purely political reasons." Leaders of OPSEC responded by stating the group is non-partisan and unconnected to any political party or presidential campaign. The military veterans political action committee called VetPAC has said "OPSEC is a shadowy Republican front group," and called their video "dubious" and "silly". Juliet Lapidos of The New York Times called the OPSEC video "a dishonest hatchet job" and remarked that while the stars of the video presented themselves as concerned citizens with no partisan motivations, their positions were inconsistent with their decision to appear in the video. Military journalist and former Marine, Geoffrey Ingersoll, reported in Business Insider that the video is a partisan effort instead of an effort to protect US troops, saying, "Obama used SEALs to kill bin Laden. Republicans are using them to eliminate Obama."
