= Hot House Flowers =

Children's book

- Author: John H. Wilson
- Illustrator: Marina Tsesarkaya
- Cover artist: Tsesarkaya
- Language: English
- Genre: Allegory
- Publisher: BookSurge Publishing
- Publication date: 24 October 2006
- Publication place: United States
- Media type: Print (Paperback)
- Pages: 26
- ISBN: 1-4196-4379-7

Hot House Flowers is an illustrated, allegorical children's book written and self-published by Brooklyn criminal court judge John H. Wilson, which compares illegal immigration to dandelions which overrun a greenhouse.

It is illustrated by Marina Tsesarkaya.

== Plot ==
A dandelion from outside a hothouse releases her seeds into the hothouse and the dandelions begin to use up all the water, soil, and sunlight. The native flowers, who remain silent for fear of appearing intolerant, begin to wither.

The God-like hothouse owner removes the dandelions. When the original dandelion sends in more seeds the native hothouse flowers use their roots and stems to push the dandelion seeds to the bottom of the hothouse, where they cannot grow. Seeing this, the dandelions outside the hothouse stop sending seeds in.

== Controversy ==
=== Alleged judicial misconduct ===
Steven Banks, chief attorney for the Legal Aid Society, has requested an inquiry by the New York Commission on Judicial Conduct, alleging that the book demonstrates Wilson's inability to act impartially in illegal immigration cases. §100.4(A) of the Rules Governing Judicial Conduct allows a judge to engage in "avocational activities" as long as they do not "cast reasonable doubt on the judge's capacity to act impartially." The Advisory Committee ruled in 1999 that judges may write nonfiction, but that "promotion of such works should not exploit the judge's judicial position."

Wilson is responsible for night-shift arraignments in Brooklyn, a position that requires him to set bail for defendants, during which he says he takes a defendant's immigration status into account: "It's got to be a factor — if a person's an illegal immigrant, how likely is it that he's going to come back to court?"

Wilson has described the book as an allegory for "the defense of home and country," which he defends as an expression of his First Amendment rights. On Fox & Friends, Wilson stated that illegal immigrants "probably should be seeking legal counsel about seeking exit from the country."

Margaret Fung, executive director of the Asian American Legal Defense and Education Fund, stated: "I would hate to be an immigrant in his courtroom."

== Reception ==
Tim Bueler, a spokesman for the Minuteman Project, praised the book as giving "great insight to children and families on the issue of illegal immigration."

Norman Eng, a spokesman for the New York Immigration Coalition criticized the book: "I think it's irresponsible for someone to write a children's book like this — one that poisons the minds of impressionable young readers with the idea that immigrants are to blame for the world's ills." Annette Clifford of the Daily Press calls it an "ugly allegory."

Lewis Black, a commentator for The Daily Show, characterised the book as "combining the charm of The Hungry Caterpillar with the subtlety of a Brooklyn criminal judge."

== See also ==
- Invasive species
