= Swift Boat challenge =

The Swift Boat challenge from US oilman T. Boone Pickens was his reported offer of $1 million to anyone who can disprove a single charge made by the Swift Vets and POWs for Truth, formerly the Swift Boat Veterans for Truth, during the Presidential election campaign.

Pickens, who had given the group $3 million in funding during the campaign, issued the challenge on November 6, 2007, in Washington, D.C., while serving as chairman of a 40th anniversary gala for The American Spectator magazine.

On November 16, 2007 U.S. Senator John Kerry, whose military service was a target of the groups' televised ads, book, and media releases and appearances, wrote a letter to Pickens accepting Pickens' offer as reported. Kerry asked Mr. Pickens to donate the $1 million to the Paralyzed Veterans of America should he succeed in proving any of the charges untrue.

That same day, Pickens issued a response, saying he was "open" to Kerry's suggestion but stated that the offer applied only to the group's television ads. He additionally required Kerry to provide his Vietnam journal, his military records, specifically those for the years 1971–1978, and copies of all movies and tapes made during his service. Pickens' letter also challenged Kerry to agree to donate $1 million to the Congressional Medal of Honor Foundation, if Kerry "cannot prove anything in the Swift Boat ads to be untrue."

On November 20, 2007, Kerry issued a letter responding to Pickens'. He accused Pickens of "parsing and backtracking" on his initial offer and wrote that "I am prepared to prove the lie and marshal all the evidence, the question is whether you are prepared to fulfill your obligation." He concluded that "the only thing remaining now is to set the date for our meeting in an appropriate forum."

On June 22, 2008, a group of Vietnam veterans accepted the challenge and sent a 12-page letter with a 42-page attachment of military records to support their case that rebutted several of the accusations of the Swift boat group. Pickens responded with a message stating "In reviewing your material, none of the information you provide speaks specifically to the issues contained in the ads, and, as a result, does not qualify for the $1 million."

== See also ==
- John Kerry military service controversy
