= Swiftboating =

Character assassination as a political tactic

The term swiftboating, also swift-boating or swift boating, is a pejorative American neologism used to describe an unfair or untrue political attack. The term is derived from Swift Boat Veterans for Truth (SBVT), the third-party organization responsible for a widely publicized—and later discredited—political smear campaign against the 2004 Democratic presidential candidate John Kerry. Since the 2004 United States presidential election, the term has been commonly applied to a political attack that is dishonest, personal, and unfair.

== Origin ==
The term "Swift Boat" itself refers to a class of United States Navy vessel used during the Vietnam War. During the 2004 presidential campaign, John Kerry's heroism under fire as a Swift Boat commander in Vietnam was a centerpiece of his campaign. A number of Vietnam veterans who had served on Swift Boats formed a 527 organization called Swift Boat Veterans for Truth with the intent of discrediting his military record and attacking his subsequent antiwar activities as a member of Vietnam Veterans Against the War. The group produced a series of television ads and a bestselling book, Unfit for Command. The unsubstantiated charges against Kerry by the SBVT gave rise to the term "swiftboating" as a synonym for "the nastiest of campaign smears", "a slimy political attack", and, for many, "ugly, unprincipled slander". As the purpose of a tax-exempt 527 organization is "to focus on the issues" rather than "attack or defend a specific candidate", the SBVT was fined by the Federal Election Commission in 2004 for specifically attacking Kerry instead of focusing on political issues. The Swift Boat Veterans and media pundits objected to this use of the term to define a smear campaign.

== Other use ==
Formed in 1997, a 527 Political Action Committee called Vietnam Veterans Against John McCain, similar to Swift Boat Veterans for Truth, attacked John McCain for his military record. Former Vietnam veteran and co-founder Ted Sampley made several false claims on McCain's military service. Sampley claimed that McCain had not been tortured while held captive in Vietnam, and that he had collaborated with the Vietcong in exchange for medical treatment. Sampley would later found another group called Vietnam Veterans Against John Kerry during the 2004 presidential race.

During the 2008 presidential race, the political action committee Brave New PAC released an attack ad against 2008 U.S. presidential candidate John McCain that was compared to swiftboating. The ad targeted McCain's POW status with a fellow prisoner of war describing him "as a very volatile guy" and someone he doesn't want "with his finger near the red button." The New York Times reported in 2008 that many Swift Boat veterans, "especially those who had nothing to do with the group that attacked Senator John Kerry's military record in the 2004 election—want their good name back, and the good names of the men not lucky enough to come home alive", expressed regret and dismay that the term "swift boat" has come to represent a political attack and "political chicanery" against a member of a different party.

Charges of "swiftboating" were made by supporters of both major candidates in the 2012 presidential election. Republican Party strategists compared attacks by the Obama campaign on Mitt Romney's tenure at Bain Capital to swiftboating: "It's very clear they are trying to re-create and take a page out for the 2004 Bush campaign." The term was also used by a representative of Barack Obama's re-election campaign to describe the documentary film Dishonorable Disclosures and an associated ad campaign released by the Special Operations OPSEC Education Fund on the topic of the death of Osama bin Laden.

During the 2016 presidential race, feminist Gloria Steinem accused Donald Trump of swiftboating his rival Hillary Clinton, calling her "Crooked Hillary", despite his record of much more frequent and severe lying. Clinton compared Republicans' statements about Christine Blasey Ford during the Kavanaugh confirmation process to the "swift-boating of John Kerry". During the 2024 United States presidential election, Republican attacks on the military record of Minnesota governor Tim Walz were widely characterized as "swiftboating" in the media.

Baltimore Banner columnist Rick Hutzell used the word to describe coverage about Gov. Wes Moore by The Baltimore Sun and Sinclair Broadcast Group stations WBFF-TV and WJLA-TV. The news outlets, all controlled by David D. Smith, have published reports questioning Moore's accounting of his military service. Smith has been copied on internal newsroom emails regarding reporting on Moore. In an interview with The Banner, Moore acknowledged errors in his recounting of events in his military service, but said they should not be understood in such a way to undermine his service.

== Conservative reactions ==
The use of this term as a pejorative has resulted in objections from some conservatives regarding the implied criticism of the tactic. In 2006, conservative commentator Emmett Tyrrell denounced its repeated negative usage, saying it "is about to join such terms as McCarthyism and McCarthyite" as a "hate term". In a 2006 interview, John O'Neill, spokesman for Swift Vets and POWs for Truth, called the term's usage a "baseless smear against somebody's personal character". Fox News Radio host John Gibson published the 2009 book How the Left Swiftboated America, where he defines swiftboating as "the political trick of claiming to expose truth while in fact lying". Republican Newt Gingrich, putting his own twist on the neologism at a presidential campaign stop on January 1, 2012, said he felt he was being "Romney-boated" by the barrage of negative ads run against him.

== See also ==
- John Kerry military service controversy
- Borking, another political neologism
- Astroturfing
- Swift Boat Challenge
- Vietnam Veterans Against John McCain
