= SF-180 =

Standard Form 180 (SF-180, the Request Pertaining to Military Records) is a one-page authorization form (plus 2 pages of instructions) of the U.S. military. The form may be filled out by veterans of the U.S. military or their surviving next-of-kin to view and/or release a person's military record.

The SF 180 may also be used to request a one-time replacement of Medals earned in service.

The release of information is subject to restrictions imposed by U.S. Department of Defense regulations and the provisions of the Freedom of Information Act and Privacy Act of 1974.

You can obtain your military records from the National Personnel Records Center or the military if you were discharged recently. You may also find private researchers who will obtain your record for a fee. The National Archives has a list of independent researchers who will undertake a personal search for you.
