= Roy Hoffmann =

United States Navy Rear Admiral and chairman (1925-2022)

Roy F. Hoffmann
- Military career
- Branch: United States Navy
- Rank: Rear Admiral
- Nickname: "Latch"

Rear Admiral Roy F. "Latch" Hoffmann, U.S. Navy (retired) (1925–2022) was chairman of the former Swift Boat Veterans for Truth, established May 4, 2004, in opposition to John Kerry's candidacy for U.S. President, and which disbanded on May 31, 2008. As a naval officer, he patrolled the Mekong Delta on swift boats during the Vietnam War.

== Early life ==
Hoffmann attended the University of Notre Dame. He was commissioned through the Naval ROTC program on June 1, 1946.

== Military career ==
His awards included the Legion of Merit, Purple Heart, World War II Victory Medal, National Defense Service Medal, and Vietnam Service Medal.

== Civilian career ==
Following his retirement from the Navy, he was a port director in Milwaukee, Wisconsin before being removed from the post.

Hoffmann claimed he got involved with the Swift Boat Veterans for Truth after reading Douglas Brinkley's book Tour of Duty, which, among other things, detailed Kerry's Swift Boat duty in Vietnam; he told The Washington Post, "I couldn't bear that someone was betraying us and being a dastardly liar. If I can be any more plain than that, I don't know."

In 2009, the Admiral Roy F. Hoffmann Foundation ceased operations.
