= Tim Bueler =

American political consultant

Tim Bueler (born 1987) is a media and political consultant and is currently serving as the Director of Media Relations for the Minuteman Project, an immigration reform advocacy group.

Radio station KLAV in Las Vegas briefly aired Tim Bueler’s Conservative Report. Bueler spoke about current issues and offered advice to callers.

Bueler traveled to Kenya with his media client, Jerome Corsi, to launch Corsi's book "The Obama Nation" which alleges secret ties between Barack Obama and Kenyan leaders. Bueler and Corsi were detained on October 7, 2008, by Kenyan immigration officials and police just before the commencement of a press conference. They were eventually deported.
