= John O'Neill (political activist) =

Vietnam War veteran, lawyer, and activist

John Ellis O'Neill is a Vietnam War veteran and lawyer who was the spokesman for Swift Boat Veterans for Truth.

== Background ==
O'Neill is from San Antonio, Texas. His grandfather was Superintendent of the Chemistry Department at the Naval Experiment Station across the Severn River from the United States Naval Academy and his father was a rear admiral. He said he followed his two brothers into the Naval Academy, graduating in 1967.

O'Neill married Anne Bradley (1947–2006) in 1976, and the couple had two children. His book Unfit for Command is dedicated to her.

== Vietnam ==
O'Neill served in the United States Navy during the Vietnam War. He commanded PCF-94, a swift boat that had previously been commanded by John Kerry, and returned from his tour of duty in June 1970. He was awarded two Bronze Stars during his service.

== Recruitment by Nixon White House ==
In 1971, Kerry, representing Vietnam Veterans Against the War, testified to the Senate Foreign Relations Committee that American soldiers were committing war crimes in Vietnam. Resentful of the allegations, O'Neill began giving television interviews opposing Kerry, supporting President Richard Nixon's Vietnam policies, and representing the newly-formed Vietnam Veterans for a Just Peace. (Note: Charles Colson, Nixon's special counsel, said that Vietnam Veterans for a Just Peace was founded by White House staffers specifically to counter Kerry's work. O'Neill denied that version of events.) According to a White House memo, O'Neill was disappointed with the negative reactions to his speaking appointments and was considering ending his advocacy by June 1971.

The Nixon White House responded to Kerry's critical testimony by searching for and recruiting veterans who could counter Kerry's narrative. Impressed with one of O'Neill's appearances, Nixon's special counsel Charles Colson arranged for O'Neill and Nixon to meet on June 16. They spent almost an hour in the Oval Office, strategizing about how to stop Kerry. After the meeting, Colson and O'Neill began challenging Kerry to debate O'Neill on live television. Kerry agreed to a June 30 debate on the Dick Cavett Show on ABC.

O'Neill strongly defended American incursions in Laos and Cambodia, and opposed anti-war veterans. He was particularly critical of claims regarding the commission of war crimes by US military personnel in Vietnam.

== Legal career ==
After 1971, O'Neill moved out of the media spotlight. He studied law at the University of Texas, graduating first in his class in 1973 and being admitted to the bar in 1974. Appointed to the President's National Advisory Counsel on Supplemental Services and Centers, he served from 1973 to 1974. He was a law clerk to Supreme Court Justice William H. Rehnquist from 1974 to 1975.

O'Neill subsequently returned to Texas to practice law, specializing in commercial litigation. He later co-founded the law firm Clements, O'Neill, Pierce, Wilson, and Fulkerson in Houston. His partners at that firm included, among others, Margaret Wilson, who once served as general counsel for George W. Bush during his time as governor of Texas, and the late Tex Lazar, who once ran for lieutenant governor on the same ticket with Bush and who died in 2003. The firm was recently subsumed into the larger Howrey LLP.

According to his most recent firm resume, in addition to practicing oil and gas litigation, O'Neill obtained one of the largest securities arbitration judgments in history representing a small-time investor who had been defrauded by a large securities company, and also successfully represented a class of immigrants in a suit against Fiesta Savings & Loan, allowing them to recover their money when the savings and loan went under.

Texas Lawyer magazine reported on February 19 and 26, 1990, that O'Neill, who was representing the plaintiffs in a securities fraud class action underlying a malpractice suit, and two other lawyers, were threatened with sanctions for allegedly violating the Texas Code of Professional Responsibility by the judge in the case, United States District Judge David Hittner, who declined to pursue the matter after the trial was completed.

In 1991, O'Neill was considered by President George H. W. Bush for nomination as a federal judge in Texas, but was passed over.

== Swift Boat Veterans ==
O'Neill stated that he turned down several requests over the years, including some from Kerry's electoral opponents, to resume his attacks upon Kerry. However, he returned to the fore in 2004 as a cofounder of a new organization, Swift Boat Veterans for Truth, later known as Swift Vets and POWs for Truth, and he is listed as the co-author, with conservative Jerome Corsi, of the book Unfit For Command: Swift Boat Veterans Speak Out Against John Kerry. Due to the baseless and false accusations included in the book and many of his public speaking events, the term "swiftboating" entered the public lexicon as an American neologism used to describe an unfair or untrue political attack. O'Neill stated that his main reason for resuming the activities was that Kerry was running for the office of President of the United States, the Commander in Chief of the US armed forces. After Kerry lost the election, O'Neill stated that he planned to return to private life. However, he continues to make some public appearances and give public interviews.

== Political contributions and activities ==
O'Neill has stated that he considers himself a "political independent." He has stated that he voted for Al Gore in 2000, and Ross Perot in 1996 and also in 1992, but records indicate he donated to the 1992 Bush-Quayle primary campaign. He has stated that he admired Democrat John Edwards during the 2004 Democratic primary but did not claim to have voted for him in that primary. However, with the exception of the 2000 election, he has not claimed to have voted for any Democratic presidential candidate since Hubert Humphrey in 1968. While he told Nixon in 1971 that he had not voted for him in the 1968 election, he seconded Nixon's nomination at the 1972 Republican National Convention. Available records indicate he voted in the Republican state primary in 1998 and has regularly contributed to the Texas Republican Party and to Republican candidates for federal office. None of the available records indicates donations to the state Democratic Party or to any Democratic candidate for federal office. However, O'Neill has claimed to have made large contributions to local Democratic candidates and supported Bill White and Ron Green for the nonpartisan positions of mayor and city councilmember, respectively, of the City of Houston. In this connection, O'Neill's name appears on an endorsement for Bill White.

O'Neill is a director of the conservative David Horowitz Freedom Center (formerly the Center for the Study of Popular Culture), co-founded by David Horowitz.

O'Neill sent a letter supporting Greg Parke, an unsuccessful candidate for the Republican nomination for a Senate seat in Vermont in 2006. He has also endorsed the presidential campaign of Duncan Hunter.

== See also ==
- John Kerry military service controversy
- List of law clerks for the ninth seat of the Supreme Court of the United States
