= Vietnam Veterans Against John McCain =

American political action committee

Vietnam Veterans Against John McCain was a 527 Political Action Committee formed in 1997. The group made controversial allegations against John McCain concerning his time as a prisoner of war in Vietnam. The group was founded by Vietnam veterans Jerry Kiley and Ted Sampley.

In 2000, Sampley called McCain a "Manchurian candidate" on his Web site and said that McCain was an agent of the Vietnamese, and in 2008, Kiley, who says he served in Vietnam for about a year, was behind a flier that claimed McCain was a "Hanoi Hilton songbird" who collaborated with the enemy.

In 2004, Kiley and Sampley formed a similar group targeting another Vietnam veteran, John Kerry, who was running for the Democratic Party nomination for President of the United States. In May 2018, a Fox News analyst, retired Air Force Lt. Gen. Thomas McInerney, was terminated from the network for reviving the debunked charges against McCain, calling the senator “Songbird John”.

The group made a video in which Bob Smith, former Republican senator from New Hampshire, Bob Dornan, former Republican representative from California, former Congressional staffers and others made various allegations against McCain. The group also disseminated taped excerpts of McCain's questioning of Dolores Alfond of the National Alliance of Families before the United States Senate Select Committee on POW/MIA Affairs.
