= Sick Call =

Sick Call
The bugle call "Sick Call", performed by Sergeant Codie Lynn Williams of Dallas, ceremonial bugler for Marine Barracks Washington

A sick call, in the United States Military, is "a daily lineup of military personnel requiring medical attention" and a "signal [such as on a bugle] announcing the time for such a lineup".

As a record of treatment provided to personnel, one or more of the attending medical personnel will typically fill out a "Sick Call Treatment Record" for each patient seen.

== See also ==
Geneva Conventions
