= Stevens Reed Curcio & Potholm =

- Industry: Advertising
- Key people: Mark McKinnon; Russell Schriefer; Stuart Stevens
- Website: srcpmedia.com

Stevens Reed Curcio & Potholm is a company that creates political advertisements for Republican candidates and politicians. They were the creators of the controversial Swift Boat Veterans commercials that attacked Senator John Kerry during his 2004 presidential election bid. The company has worked for such notable Republicans as John McCain, Bill Frist and others.
