= Swift Vets and POWs for Truth =

American political group (2004–08) opposing John Kerry

- Formation: May 4, 2004
- Founders: John O’Neill; Jerome Corsi
- Dissolved: May 31, 2008; 18 years ago
- Type: 527 organization
- Purpose: Political advocacy; opposition to John Kerry’s 2004 U.S. presidential campaign
- Headquarters: Houston, Texas, U.S.
- Region served: United States
- Key people: Merrie Spaeth; Ken Starr
- Revenue: Over $20 million (2004)
- Website: swiftvets.com

Swift Vets and POWs for Truth, formerly known as the Swift Boat Veterans for Truth (SBVT), was an American political organization (527 organization) of United States Swift boat veterans; former prisoners of war of the Vietnam War, formed during the 2004 presidential election campaign, for the purpose of opposing John Kerry's candidacy for the presidency. The campaign inspired the widely used political pejorative "swiftboating", to describe an unfair or untrue political attack; they disbanded and ceased operations on May 31, 2008.

SBVT asserted that Kerry was "unfit to serve" as president, based upon his alleged "willful distortion of the conduct" of American servicemen during that war, and his alleged "withholding and/or distortion of material facts" as to his own conduct during that war. SBVT stated that "Kerry's phony war crimes charges, his exaggerated claims about his own service in Vietnam, and his deliberate misrepresentation of the nature and effectiveness of Swift boat operations compel us to step forward." The group challenged the legitimacy of each of the combat medals awarded to Kerry by the U.S. Navy and the disposition of his discharge. Further, SBVT said that Kerry's later criticism of the war was a "betrayal of trust" with other soldiers, and that by his activism he had caused direct "harm" to soldiers still at war.

These claims caused tremendous controversy during the election, particularly because the organization's members were in a place to assess Kerry, but few had served with him personally, while most Vietnam veterans who had served under him supported Kerry's version of events.

Registered under Section 527 of the Internal Revenue Code, SBVT publicized its criticisms of Kerry during the election campaign in a book, in television advertisements that the group ran in swing states and in the media coverage some members received. The group was the subject of several complaints to the Federal Election Commission (FEC). After the election, the group was credited by media and praised by conservatives as contributing to Kerry's defeat. The group's tactics are considered an example of a successful political smear campaign for its widely publicized and later discredited claims.

== Membership ==
SBVT was formed in 2004. Membership was initially limited to veterans of the Vietnam War who at some point served in a Swift boat unit, as did Kerry.

Of the 3,500 Swift boat sailors who served in Vietnam, the names of some 250 appeared on the group's statement against Kerry; most did not serve at the same time or in the same place as Kerry. Founding members of SBVT include Rear Admiral Roy Hoffmann (retired), a former commander of Swift boat forces; Colonel Bud Day, who earned the Medal of Honor; Houston attorney John O'Neill, an officer who became commander of Swift Boat PCF 94 several months after Kerry's departure in 1969 and who appeared opposite Kerry in a televised 1971 debate between them on The Dick Cavett Show; and 13 other named veterans. Several of those who joined SBVT during the 2004 campaign were officers who had previously praised Kerry's conduct during the Vietnam War. These included Division Commander Grant Hibbard, who wrote positive evaluations of Kerry, and Commander George Elliott, who submitted Kerry for a Silver Star. SBVT asserted that it included, in total, 16 officers who served with Kerry in Coastal Division 11 as members. Despite SBVT's statements that Kerry's "entire chain of command" belonged to the group, Joseph Streuli, former commander of Coastal Division 13, Charles Horne, former commander of Coastal Squadron 1, and Art Price, former commander CTF 116, who are described in "Unfit for Command" as part of Kerry's chain of command, were not affiliated with the group.

The group's initial letter against Kerry stated "It is our collective judgment that, upon your return from Vietnam, you grossly and knowingly distorted the conduct of the American soldiers, marines, sailors and airmen of that war (including a betrayal of many of us, without regard for the danger your actions caused us). Further, we believe that you have withheld and/or distorted material facts as to your own conduct in this war." However, Kerry had posted over 100 pages of his military records at his website nearly two weeks before the issuance of the SBVT letter, and had also made his military medical records available for inspection by reporters (and provided a summary from his doctor).

Not all SBVT members said that they were signing the letter for the same reason. For example, from an interview published the day before the letter was made public: "'[Kerry] earned his medals, he did what he was supposed to do in Vietnam,' said retired Coast Guard Captain Adrian Lonsdale, who was in the chain of command above Kerry and oversaw various operations dealing with Navy swift boats of the type Kerry commanded. 'But I was very disappointed in his statements after he got out of the Navy.'"

Of those who served in Kerry's boat crew, only Stephen Gardner joined SBVT. He was not present on any of the occasions when Kerry earned his medals, including his Purple Hearts. Gardner appeared in two of the group's television advertisements.

All other living members of Kerry's crew supported his presidential bid, and some frequently campaigned with him as his self-described "band of brothers". Kerry crew members have disputed some of SBVT's various allegations, calling them "totally false" (Drew Whitlow), "garbage" (Gene Thorson), and "a pack of lies" (Del Sandusky).

No members of SBVT were aboard Kerry's boat during any of the incidents for which he was decorated. The only member of SBVT who was present at the Silver Star incident, Rood's crew member Larry Clayton Lee, praised Kerry's tactics and stated that he earned his Silver Star. However, he stated that based on discussions with other SBVT members, he came to question whether Kerry deserved other medals for incidents at which he was not present.

On September 29, 2004, SBVT announced that it was joining forces with a group of American prisoners of war who were held captive by the North Vietnamese during the war to form the new group, "Swift Vets and POWs For Truth".

== Media activities ==
SBVT produced several television advertisements created by Stevens Reed Curcio & Potholm attacking Kerry's actions both in and after Vietnam. For a detailed discussion of SBVT's allegations about Kerry's service in Vietnam, see John Kerry military service controversy.

=== First television advertisement ===
SBVT first went public with a May 4, 2004, press conference declaring opposition to Kerry. When the press conference garnered little attention, the organization produced television advertisements. On August 5, 2004, SBVT began airing a one-minute television spot in three hotly contested states in the ongoing presidential election. The advertisement, entitled "Any Questions?", was a collage of short clips of 13 SBVT members, many of whom stated they served with John Kerry or had direct contact with Kerry during his service in Vietnam. The veterans appearing in the ad said Kerry was dishonest, unreliable, unfit to lead, and had dishonored his country and fellow veterans. Only one of the men in the advertisement (Steve Gardner) served under Kerry, but some sailed on other boats grouped with Kerry's.

Among the first to denounce the first ad was Republican Senator John McCain, a Bush supporter, Vietnam veteran, and former POW. He said, "I condemn the [SBVT] ad. It is dishonest and dishonorable. I think it is very, very wrong". Senator McCain would be criticized four years later during his own presidential campaign for accepting money and support from many of the same Swiftboaters.

=== Book ===
SBVT founder and spokesman John O'Neill and Jerome Corsi are listed as coauthors of the book Unfit for Command: Swift Boat Veterans Speak Out Against John Kerry, published by Regnery Publishing. A best-seller upon its release in August 2004, it criticized Kerry's judgment in battle, his truthfulness, his entitlement to certain medals, and his later anti-war activities. The book was based in part on interviews with veterans who served in or with Kerry's division, and also on biographies of Kerry. Several members of Kerry's crew stated that O'Neill did not interview them; some veterans who were interviewed asserted that their statements were edited to strip out material favorable to Kerry. Neither O'Neill nor Corsi had any firsthand knowledge of Kerry's service. O'Neill served on the Swift boats after Kerry left Vietnam, and Corsi never served in Vietnam.

After controversial statements made by Corsi became public, O'Neill denied Corsi's coauthorship of the book, saying that Corsi was "simply an editor and not really any sort of co-author." However, portions of the book contain material also found in articles posted under Corsi's name at a website critical of John Kerry, and O'Neill is cited in a later book as describing Corsi as helping to write "Unfit for Command", and urging him to back out of media appearances after the controversial comments became public.

=== Second television advertisement ===
On August 20, 2004, SBVT released a second television advertisement featuring a portion of Kerry's 1971 testimony, before the Senate Foreign Relations Committee. Kerry, testifying as a member of Vietnam Veterans Against the War (VVAW), had criticized U.S. policy in Vietnam. He had also described VVAW's 1971 Winter Soldier Investigation, in which more than 100 soldiers and civilians said they had seen or committed atrocities carried out by U.S. forces in Vietnam. Kerry's Senate testimony presented a summary of these men's statements; he did not, however, say that he had any personal knowledge of these atrocities. The SBVT advertisement alternated clips of Kerry's summary of these statements with charges from Vietnam veterans, particularly former POWs, that Kerry's "accusations" had demoralized and "betrayed" soldiers in Vietnam.

=== Third television advertisement ===
A third television advertisement began airing on August 26, 2004, attacking Kerry's past statements that he was in Cambodia on Christmas Eve, 1968. This advertisement featured Stephen Gardner stating, "I spent more time on John Kerry's boat than any other crew member. ... John Kerry claims that he spent Christmas in 1968 in Cambodia and that is categorically a lie. Not in December, not in January. We were never in Cambodia on a secret mission, ever."

However, Gardner was only a member of Kerry's crew for a month and a half, from December 6, 1968, to approximately January 22, 1969; crew directories and first hand accounts indicate that other crewmembers served as long or longer under Kerry's four-month-long command.

In addition, Kerry had never said that the Christmas Eve incident was a "secret mission", but happened during a routine patrol; furthermore, he stated at least two weeks prior to the ad's appearance that he had been patrolling at or near the border at the time and subsequently ambushed. The account of the patrol appears in Douglas Brinkley's Tour of Duty, [pp. 209–219] and Cmdr. Elliott noted in Kerry's fitness report that his boat was ambushed during the Christmas truce of 1968. Moreover, Kerry's biographer, Douglas Brinkley, has stated that Kerry "went into Cambodian waters three or four times in January and February 1969 on clandestine missions".

=== Fourth television advertisement ===
On August 31, 2004, a fourth advertisement was released by SBVT. The advertisement described Kerry as a man who "renounced his country's symbols", a reference to a Vietnam War protest where Kerry threw war decorations over the fence of the U.S. Capitol building on April 23, 1971. The advertisement also contained edited video clips of Kerry from a WRC-TV program called Viewpoints, in which he stated that he gave back "six, seven, eight, nine" (in response to a question: "How many did you give back, John?"); it then included a clip from another part of that interview where Kerry stated "and that was the medals themselves", although in the interview it was not in reference to the decorations he returned.

== Controversy ==
=== Truth of allegations ===
Early in the advertising campaign, Time magazine surveyed public credence in the SBVT advertisements among those who viewed them. The poll, conducted August 24 through 26, showed that about one-third of viewers believed there was at least "some truth" to the allegations. Among swing voters, about one-fourth felt there was any truth to the ads.

A major part of the SBVT controversy centered on the group's testimony. The SBVT statements were accompanied by affidavits. One affiant, Alfred French, acknowledged he had no firsthand knowledge of the events to which he had sworn.

In May 2006, The New York Times reported that an early member of the group, Steve Hayes, stated that he came to believe that the group was twisting Kerry's record, and broke with the group and voted for Kerry. Hayes told the Times:

The mantra was just 'We want to set the record straight' ... It became clear to me that it was morphing from an organization to set the record straight into a highly political vendetta. They knew it was not the truth.

Hayes also told The New York Times that he provided a long interview to Kerry's supporters, backing their version of the incident for which Kerry received the Bronze Star.

==== First television advertisement ====
The first SBVT ad was contradicted by the statements of several other veterans who observed the incidents, by the Navy's official records, and, in some instances, by the contemporaneous statements of SBVT members themselves.

Several major newspapers were also skeptical of the SBVT allegations. For example, a New York Times news article stated, "on close examination, the accounts of Swift Boat Veterans for Truth prove to be riddled with inconsistencies." Regarding the medal dispute, a Los Angeles Times editorial stated, "Not limited by the conventions of our colleagues in the newsroom, we can say it outright: These charges against John Kerry are false." The editorial argued this position on the basis that "Kerry is backed by almost all those who witnessed the events in question, as well as by documentation." On August 22, 2004 The Washington Post reported: "An investigation by The Washington Post into what happened that day suggests that both sides have withheld information from the public record and provided an incomplete, and sometimes inaccurate, picture of what took place. But although Kerry's accusers have succeeded in raising doubts about his war record, they have failed to come up with sufficient evidence to prove him a liar."

The ABC television show Nightline traveled to Vietnam and interviewed Vietnamese who were involved in the battle for which Kerry was awarded the Silver Star. These witnesses disputed O'Neill's charge that there "was little or no fire" that day; they said that the fighting was fierce. SBVT supporters question whether these witnesses are reliable because they spoke "in the presence of a Communist official", but their account of enemy fire is substantially the same as that previously given by another former Viet Cong to an AP reporter and by the American witnesses, including the only SBVT member who was actually present that day, Larry Clayton Lee. ABC News's The Note opined, "the Swift Boat ad and their primary charges about Kerry's medals are personal, negative, extremely suspect, or false."

==== Book, other media statements ====
Jerome Corsi has said that a picture of Kerry's 1993 visit to Vietnam hangs in the War Remnants Museum in Ho Chi Minh City as a gesture of "honor" by the Communists "for his contribution to their victory over [the] United States", and John O'Neill has stated that Kerry "is in the North Vietnamese war museum as a hero... . one of the heroes who caused them to win the war in Vietnam". The statement is also repeated in "Unfit for Command" (pp 167–174). However, Josh Gerstein of the New York Sun stated in this regard:

While the museum clearly honors opponents of the war from America and other countries, it is not clear that the photo of Mr. Kerry is part of that tribute. The picture of the senator hangs among a set of photos devoted to the restoration of diplomatic relations between America and Vietnam in the 1990s. The picture apparently was taken as Kerry took part in a delegation President Bill Clinton sent to Hanoi in 1993. Other photos nearby show visits during that period by former American officials who played key roles in the Vietnam War, including a Navy admiral who has since died, Elmo Zumwalt, and a defense secretary, Robert McNamara. A secretary of state during Clinton's term, Warren Christopher, is also shown meeting Vietnamese officials

— Josh Gerstein

In this connection, the web page Corsi and another anti-Kerry veteran originally published on the Kerry museum photo contained the picture of Robert McNamara's 1995 meeting with General Giáp, who was misidentified as "Mao Tse-tung". (Photo #10).

In addition, John O'Neill said that in 1971 John Kerry "wanted to abandon ship and leave the POWs [in Vietnam]" and that "[o]n the Dick Cavett show and elsewhere, John Kerry's position was that we should accept the Madame Binh seven-point proposal, which called for unilateral withdrawal, setting a date after which at some future time, we'd negotiate the return of the POWs. So we would set a date. We would withdraw and then we would begin to discuss how to bring them home". However, in the Cavett debate, Kerry actually said:

Now, if we were to set a date for withdrawal from Southeast Asia, we can – the Vietnamese, first of all, have said it will be settled prior to the arrival of that date, but we can set a time limit on that. If the prisoners of war aren't back prior to the arrival of that date, then I think we would have – for the first time in all of our history in Vietnam we would have a legitimate reason for taking some kind of reaction to it.

— John Kerry

=== Connections with Republicans ===
SBVT characterized itself as a non-partisan group both in the legal sense and in spirit, yet several prominent individuals who assisted SBVT also have had close ties to the Republican Party. According to information released by the IRS on February 22, 2005, more than half of the group's reported contributions came from just three sources, all prominent Texas Republican donors: Houston builder Bob J. Perry, a longtime supporter of George W. Bush, donated $4.45 million, Harold Simmons' Contrans donated $3 million, and T. Boone Pickens, Jr. donated $2 million. Other major contributors included Bush fundraiser Carl Lindner ($300,000), Robert Lindner ($260,000), GOP contributor Aubrey McClendon ($250,000), George Matthews Jr. ($250,000), and Crow Holdings ($100,000).

The initial communications consultant for SBVT was Merrie Spaeth, a Reagan administration press officer and a volunteer consultant to Ken Starr in the Clinton impeachment; she was also a spokesperson for "Republicans for Clean Air", a 527 group opposing John McCain's 2000 presidential campaign and funded by Bush supporters who also helped fund SBVT. John E. O'Neill — the primary author of Unfit for Command and a key player in the formation of SBVT — donated over $14,000 to Republican candidates. He co-operated with the Nixon White House in opposing Kerry in 1971, and seconded Nixon's nomination at the 1972 Republican national convention.

Retired Admiral William Schachte, a principal source for the SBVT allegations about Kerry's first Purple Heart, has donated to both of Bush's presidential campaigns. Schachte was also a lobbyist for FastShip, a firm that recently announced it was receiving $40 million in federal funding for one of its projects. In addition, Schachte's lobbying firm associate, David Norcross, was chairman of the 2004 Republican convention. Chris LaCivita, Political Director of the National Republican Senatorial Committee in 2002, worked as a private contractor providing media advice for SBVT.

The SBVT postal address was registered to Susan Arceneaux, treasurer of the Majority Leader's Fund, a PAC closely tied to the former Congressional leader, Republican Dick Armey.

Republican activist Sam Fox's donation of $50,000 to SBVT during the 2004 campaign caused a controversy when Bush nominated him to the position of ambassador to Belgium. Because the Democratic members of the Senate Foreign Relations Committee indicated that they would not support his nomination, Bush withdrew the nomination; he appointed Fox to the position on April 4, 2007, while Congress was in recess.

These ties, along with others (see below), led to suggestions in the popular press that SBVT was a front group for Republicans.

=== Connections with the Bush campaign ===
The Bush campaign became part of the general SBVT controversy when McCain condemned the first SBVT ad, and said, "I hope that the president will also condemn it." The Bush campaign did not condemn SBVT or the SBVT ads. The campaign did not endorse the group either, stating "We have not and we will not question Senator Kerry's service in Vietnam." Kerry was dismissive of this statement, saying, "Of course, the President keeps telling people he would never question my service to our country. Instead, he watches as a Republican-funded attack group does just that." Kerry also alleged that SBVT was "a front for the Bush campaign. And the fact that the President won't denounce what they're up to tells you everything you need to know—he wants them to do his dirty work". When pressed on the issue, President Bush called for an end to all 527 group political advertisements, and challenged Kerry to do the same.

Critics and the Kerry campaign pointed to several specific connections between SBVT and the Bush campaign. The Kerry campaign asserted that Bush campaign headquarters in Florida distributed fliers promoting SBVT events, a charge the Bush campaign denied. Kenneth Cordier, former vice-chair of Veterans for Bush/Cheney (in 2000) and volunteer member of the Bush campaign veterans steering committee, appeared in the second SBVT advertisement. The Bush campaign asked him to resign and stated that it had been unaware of his SBVT involvement.

On August 25, 2004, Benjamin Ginsberg, the top election lawyer to the Bush campaign on campaign finance law, also resigned after it was learned that SBVT was one of his clients. Ginsberg stated that he was withdrawing to avoid being a distraction to the campaign. He declared that he had acted "in a manner that is fully appropriate and legal," arguing that it was not uncommon or illegal for lawyers to represent campaigns or political parties while also representing 527 groups. He also maintained that he did not disclose to the Bush campaign that he was simultaneously representing the SBVT group. After leaving the Bush campaign, Ginsberg retained his status as counsel to SBVT.

In January 2005, Governor Jeb Bush, the President's brother and Florida chairman for his 2004 campaign, sent a letter to SBVT member and former POW Bud Day, thanking him for his "personal support of my brother in his re-election." In addition, Governor Bush said of the SBVT:

As someone who truly understands the risk of standing up for something, I simply cannot express in words how much I value their willingness to stand up against John Kerry.

=== Federal Election Commission filings ===
FEC Cases #5511 and #5525

On August 10, 2004, three campaign finance watchdog groups — Democracy 21, the Campaign Legal Center, and OpenSecrets — jointly filed an independent complaint with the Federal Election Commission (Case #5511). The complaint alleged that SBVT's sources of funding were in violation of federal election law in that "Swift Boat Veterans for Truth (SBVT) is registered with the IRS as a section 527 group but is not registered with the Commission as a political committee. However, SBVT is, in fact, a federal political committee."

On August 20, 2004, the Kerry campaign filed a complaint with the FEC (Case #5525) alleging that SBVT and 20 additional named respondents had conducted campaign activity that "has been coordinated with the Bush campaign and the Republican Party from the outset." Under federal election law, SBVT, as a nonpartisan 527 group, was barred from coordinating with any political campaign. The complaint, citing the "ties" noted above, claimed a "web of connections to the Bush family, high-profile Texas political figures, and President Bush's chief political aide, Karl Rove".

The Bush campaign dismissed charges of ties and asserted there was no co-ordination between SBVT and the campaign. Editorial opinion on the evidence for co-ordination varied. ABC News' The Note stated, "There is no evidence that the Bush campaign is orchestrating the Swift Boat Veterans for Truth." In contrast, the New York Times opined that the SBVT attacks were "orchestrated by negative-campaign specialists deep in the heart of the Texas Republican machine."

FEC Findings – Cases #5511 and #5525

On December 13, 2006, in a consolidated finding, the FEC ruled against the Kerry campaign allegations (Case #5525) finding that...

Following an investigation, the Commission concluded that Swiftvets did not unlawfully coordinate its activities with, or make excessive in-kind contributions to, any federal candidate or political party committee.

In addition, Kerry campaign complaints against 18 other respondents were relegated to "dismissed-other" and 2 relegated to "Reason To Believe/No Further Action" (RTB/NFA) status.

The FEC did, however, find for the joint complainants (Case #5511) in that the SBVT failed to register and file disclosure reports as a federal political committee, and accepted contributions in violation of federal limits and source prohibitions. SBVT was assessed a fine of $299,500.

The conciliation agreement between the FEC and the SBVT also stated, in part:

Indeed, the Commission has never alleged that the SwiftVets acted in knowing defiance of the law, or with the conscious recognition that their actions were prohibited by law, made no findings or conclusions that there were any knowing and willful violations of the law in connection with this matter, and, thus, does not challenge SwiftVets' assertion of its good faith reliance on its understanding of the law.

Solely for the purpose of settling this matter expeditiously and avoiding litigation, without admission with respect to any other proceeding, and with no finding of probable cause by the Commission, SwiftVets agrees not to contest the Commission's conclusions . ...

In addition, as part of the conciliation agreement, SBVT stated that upon completing its obligations under the agreement, it "intends to cease operations as an IRC Section 527 organization and to donate the remainder of its funds to a charity supporting the families of U.S. servicemen and servicewomen killed or wounded in the War in Iraq."

=== Disclosure of documents ===
During the campaign, SBVT criticized Kerry for not signing a Standard Form 180 authorizing general public access to his Navy personnel records. Kerry responded that the documents were posted on his website. In May 2005, Kerry confirmed his signing of the SF-180 form permitting release of his service records and medical records to reporters from the Boston Globe, the Los Angeles Times, and the Associated Press; he refused a request by the New York Sun for access to the records. The Boston Globe and Los Angeles Times reported that the records largely duplicated what Kerry had released during the campaign.

SBVT members also criticized Kerry for not releasing his own private journals and letters. However, SBVT members themselves refused to release documents. For example, a journal by another of the Swift boat commanders and the relevant Navy records of some of the SBVT members involved in specific allegations have not been released.

The White House refused to release records detailing any Bush administration contacts with prominent individuals associated with SBVT. The denied Freedom of Information Act request was filed on August 24, 2007, by Citizens for Responsibility and Ethics in Washington.

== Discredited ==
The claims of the group were discredited by FactCheck.org and other mainstream media sources, while a number of Vietnam veterans who served alongside Kerry or under his command disputed the criticisms and supported Kerry's version of events and his presidential aspirations.

== "Swiftboating" ==
Since the 2004 election, the term "swiftboating" (or "swift boating") has become a common expression for a campaign attacking opponents by questioning their credibility and patriotism in a dishonest manner. The term is most often used with the pejorative meaning of a smear campaign.

== See also ==
- John Kerry military service controversy
- Swift Boat challenge
