= Jerome Corsi =

American conservative author (born 1946)

- Born: Jerome Robert Corsi; August 31, 1946 (age 80); East Cleveland, Ohio, U.S.
- Education: Case Western Reserve University (BA); Harvard University (MA, PhD)
- Occupation: Writer

Academic background
- Thesis: Prior Restraint, Prior Punishment, and Political Dissent: A Moral and Legal Evaluation (1972)
- Academic advisor: Michael Walzer
- Influences: Freund; Sutherland; Tribe

Academic work
- Discipline: Political science
- Writing career
- Genre: Non-fiction
- Subjects: Assassination of John F. Kennedy; Birtherism; cultural Marxism; deep state; Islamic terrorism; Iranian nuclear program; New World Order; North American Union
- Notable works: Unfit for Command; The Obama Nation
- Movements: Ultraconservatism; Birtherism

Jerome Robert Corsi (born August 31, 1946) is an American conspiracy theorist and author. His two New York Times best-selling books, Unfit for Command (2004) and The Obama Nation (2008), attacked Democratic presidential candidates and have been criticized for inaccuracies.

In other books and columns for conservative to right-wing websites such as WorldNetDaily and Human Events, Corsi has discussed conspiracy theories, such as the alleged plans for a North American Union government; the "birther" claims that President Barack Obama is not a United States citizen; criticism of the United States government for allegedly covering up information about the September 11 attacks; and alleged United States support of Iran in its attempts to develop nuclear weapons.

In 2017, he became the Washington, D.C., bureau chief for the conspiracy theory website InfoWars but no longer works for the website.

In 2018, Corsi was subpoenaed by the Mueller special counsel investigation over his contacts with former Donald Trump adviser Roger Stone and alleged foreknowledge of WikiLeaks releases of stolen Clinton emails. Corsi claimed that he turned down a plea deal with Robert Mueller, and denied any such contacts or knowledge. Draft court documents released in November showed that he emailed Stone several times, updating him about impending WikiLeaks releases of stolen emails.

In November 2019, Stone was convicted of lying to Congress and other charges. Stone had testified to Congress that Randy Credico was his WikiLeaks go-between, but prosecutors said this was a lie in order to protect Corsi.

== Early life ==
Corsi was born in East Cleveland, Ohio, to Alice (Hanlon) Corsi and Louis E. Corsi, a Democratic Party activist and a leader of the United Transportation Union. He graduated from St. Ignatius High School in 1964, and graduated from Case Western Reserve University in 1968. He received a PhD in political science from Harvard University in 1972.

In 1972 Corsi published his doctoral dissertation, Prior Restraint, Prior Punishment, and Political Dissent: A Moral and Legal Evaluation, which discussed the 1968 Democratic National Convention and Vietnam War protests in the context of government tolerance of "internal political activism." His dissertation advisor was Michael Walzer.

== Career ==
Corsi began to work in banking and finance in 1981. In 1995 he helped launch a mutual fund to invest in formerly communist Poland after the fall of the Soviet Union, which eventually lost $1.2 million (~$2.31 million in 2025), much of it from a group of about 20 Minnesota investors. Some of the investors blamed the organizers, including Corsi, for their investment in the formerly Communist country. Two investors sued Corsi and his partners, claiming that the organizers had given their personal guarantee backing up the investment, and won judgments against them. They did not collect from Corsi, because, as one investor claimed, the money "had been moved into his wife's name ... There was nothing to get out of him". The FBI found no basis for bringing criminal charges. Until his 2004 book, Corsi was a financial services marketing specialist.

In January 2005, Corsi told the Boston Herald that he planned to run for John Kerry's Senate seat in Massachusetts in 2008 as a Republican or Independent candidate.

In January 2017, Corsi announced that he was leaving his position as a senior staff writer for far right fringe website WorldNetDaily to open and lead the Washington, D.C., bureau for conspiracy theory website InfoWars. By mid-2018, he was no longer working there. In 2019, Corsi unsuccessfully sued InfoWars and Alex Jones for defamation.

== Special Counsel investigation ==
In September 2018, Corsi was subpoenaed to testify in the Special Counsel investigation, reportedly for his contacts with Roger Stone. Corsi also turned over computer, phone, and email records. The Office of the Special Counsel reportedly has information suggesting Corsi possessed advance knowledge that WikiLeaks had obtained the hacked emails of John Podesta. Corsi has denied that he had any advance knowledge of the hack, or that he has had any communication with anyone involved in the hack. Corsi announced on November 12, 2018, that he expected to be indicted for perjury within days. Eleven days later he confirmed he had entered plea negotiations with Mueller prosecutors. On November 26, 2018, Corsi stated that he rejected the plea deal brought by the Special Counsel to plead guilty to one count of perjury; he stated that he rejected it because he did not willfully mislead anyone.

Draft court documents, released in November, showed that two months before WikiLeaks released emails stolen from the Clinton campaign, Corsi sent emails to Trump campaign adviser Roger Stone informing him that WikiLeaks was going to publish the emails in two "dumps", giving dates of the planned releases and that the "impact planned" would be "very damaging." Stone also sent Corsi an email directing him to contact Julian Assange "and get the pending (WikiLeaks) emails." Corsi told Mueller's investigators he ignored the direction, but investigators found he had passed it to an associate in London, whom Corsi later identified as Ted Malloch, who had worked with the Trump campaign and been questioned by Mueller's investigators in April 2018.

Corsi retained attorney Larry Klayman, who in December filed (on Corsi's behalf) a request for an investigation into the Special Counsel's tactics and a lawsuit alleging Mueller and other government actors violated Corsi's constitutional rights and leaked grand jury secrets;

On January 25, 2019, Corsi confirmed that he is "Person 1" cited in the federal indictment of Roger Stone and predicted that he won't face charges. "Dr. Corsi has reviewed the indictment of Roger Stone which references him as Person 1. The Stone Indictment does not accuse Dr. Corsi of any wrongdoing. Dr. Corsi has fully cooperated with the Special Counsel and his prosecutors and testified truthfully to the grand jury, as well as during interviews with them", Corsi said through his legal counsel, Larry Klayman and David Gray. On February 7, Corsi sued Stone for defamation.

In an April 21 article, The Washington Post reported Corsi's lawyer, David Gray, asserting investigators were "dumbfounded" by Corsi's inconsistent testimony, and Gray himself found some of it "concerning". Investigators ultimately decided, after extensive interviews of Corsi, that (according to Gray), they could not "use any of this". Gray attributed Corsi's shifting stories to a poor memory and his well-established habit of picking "truthful facts woven in a way that you don't have to worry about the things that are inconsistent". Corsi quotes himself as telling investigators: "Sometimes I can't tell if I remembered or invented".

In May, 2020, Corsi was caught accidentally emailing a Mueller prosecutor, Aaron Zelinsky, about another case, showing Corsi personally had his contact information in his email, and suggesting he had been working with him directly. Corsi had been attempting to e-mail Vladimir Zelenko, who made exaggerated claims about hydroxychloroquine-antibiotic-zinc cocktails and their alleged efficacy in treating COVID-19 that were not supported by peer-reviewed evidence.

== Writings ==
Corsi has written about many subjects, including Democratic politicians and conspiracy theories. According to The Guardian in 2008, Corsi has been accused by the American press "of being anti-Islamic, anti-Catholic, anti-Semitic and homophobic, and of exploiting racial prejudices in an attempt to 'scare white America'". Corsi wrote a critical biography of then Democratic presidential candidate John Kerry called Unfit for Command: Swift Boat Veterans Speak Out Against John Kerry (2004). In 2005 he published Atomic Iran: How the Terrorist Regime Bought the Bomb and American Politicians, which claimed Democratic politicians are corrupted by Iranian money and are helping the Ulamas, who seek nuclear weapons, in Tehran. That same year he co-authored Black Gold Stranglehold: The Myth of Scarcity and the Politics of Oil (2005) with Craig R. Smith.

In 2006, he co-authored Showdown with Nuclear Iran: Radical Islam's Messianic Mission to Destroy Israel and Cripple the United States with Michael D. Evans. In August 2006 he published Minutemen: The Battle to Secure America's Borders with Minutemen founder Jim Gilchrist. This book criticized President George W. Bush's border protection policies, accusing him of furthering plans to create a North American Union. Corsi co-wrote the book Rebuilding America (published May 2006), with Kenneth Blackwell, then Ohio secretary of state and a Republican candidate for Governor of Ohio.

In 2007, Corsi called for the impeachment of George W. Bush. On August 15, 2008, Corsi endorsed Constitution Party presidential candidate Chuck Baldwin, who had campaigned to reopen the investigation into the September 11, 2001 attacks in support of the 9/11 Truth movement.

Corsi has also referred to Martin Luther King Jr. as a "shakedown artist".

FactCheck.org called Corsi's The Obama Nation "a mishmash of unsupported conjecture, half-truths, logical fallacies and outright falsehoods". Obama's campaign has criticized Corsi as a "bigoted fringe author" for these claims, as well as "the bizarre, conspiratorial views that Jerome Corsi has advocated in his broader work". Corsi has also appeared on INN World Report, a news program on Free Speech TV, to advance his claims.

While QAnon was initially promoted by Corsi, Right Wing Watch reported that Corsi and Jones both ceased to support QAnon by May 2018, declaring the source "completely compromised". But in August 2018, Corsi reversed course and said he "will comment on and follow QAnon when QAnon is bringing forth news", adding that "in the last few days, QAnon has been particularly good".

=== Unfit for Command ===
In August 2004, Corsi's Unfit for Command: Swift Boat Veterans Speak Out Against John Kerry, with attributed coauthor John O'Neill, was published by Regnery Publishing. The book sold more than 1.2 million copies.

The main theme of Corsi's portion of the book was to criticize Kerry's antiwar activities after returning from Vietnam, and to dispute many of his and other antiwar activists' assertions that U.S. soldiers had committed war crimes and atrocities, burned down villages, and murdered innocent civilians in Vietnam. Kerry gained notoriety, the book argues, by bringing to light such horrific events as the My Lai Massacre, thus damaging the image of the U.S. Military in the Winter Soldier hearings.

The other theme of the book was that Kerry's four-month tour in Vietnam had been marked by cowardice under fire and fraudulently obtaining medals. In that regard, the book contained statements by some veterans of the Vietnam War who served with John Kerry on Swift Boats, several of whom executed affidavits in support of their claims; these claims were repudiated by other veterans who served with Kerry and often were disproven by outside sources, including the Navy's official records.

After controversial comments Corsi had made at the Free Republic website were publicized by the Media Matters for America website, John O'Neill claimed that Corsi was not actually a co-author of the book Unfit for Command, but rather was "simply an editor". Nevertheless, O'Neill described Corsi as the book's "coauthor" in a 2007 letter to The New York Times. Scott Swett and Tim Ziegler describe Corsi's efforts in writing the book, referring to him as one of its "authors" in their book To Set the Record Straight.

In 2007 Corsi, along with Bill Gertz, Lt. Col. Robert (Buzz) Patterson, Joel Mowbray, and Richard Miniter, sued Regnery's parent company, Eagle Publishing, claiming the company "orchestrate[d] and participate[d] in a fraudulent, deceptively concealed and self-dealing scheme to divert book sales away from retail outlets and to wholly owned subsidiary organizations within the Eagle conglomerate". The suit was dismissed on June 30, 2008.

=== The Obama Nation ===
Corsi's book The Obama Nation: Leftist Politics and the Cult of Personality was released on August 1, 2008, and is critical of Barack Obama and his candidacy for president. In response, the Obama campaign issued a 40-page rebuttal called "Unfit for Publication" on his website FightTheSmears.com, alleging factual errors.

Many of the accusations made in the book are unsubstantiated, misleading or inaccurate.

According to The New York Times, "Significant parts of the book, whose subtitle is 'Leftist Politics and the Cult of Personality,' have been challenged in the days since its debut on Aug. 1." The book made its first appearance on The New York Times' Best Sellers list for nonfiction hardcovers at No. 1. Corsi conducted over 100 interviews promoting the book, including a scheduled appearance on The Political Cesspool, a white supremacist radio talk show. He previously appeared on the show on July 20, but he canceled his August 17 appearance, citing a change in travel plans. In August 2008, Corsi appeared on Alex Jones' radio show and promoted The Obama Nation.

In a debate with Corsi on Larry King Live, Paul Waldman, a senior fellow at Media Matters for America, accused him of using "baseless innuendo" as a tactic to "smear" Obama.

On October 7, 2008, Corsi and his media consultant Tim Bueler were detained by immigration authorities in Kenya while engaged in further research related to the book, allegedly for failure to have a work permit. Corsi had scheduled a press conference to announce the claim that Obama had raised a million dollars for the election campaign of Kenyan prime minister Raila Odinga, and had helped run Odinga's campaign as a strategist, including setting the stage for the campaign of violence and bloodshed that had brought Odinga to power after a disputed election. The meeting was interrupted by Kenyan immigration officials when they detained Corsi. Corsi was eventually deported.

=== Black Gold Stranglehold ===
Corsi has also promoted the theory of abiogenic petroleum origin (as opposed to the scientifically accepted theory for the formation of petroleum from biological matter). In his book Black Gold Stranglehold: The Myth of Scarcity and the Politics of Oil, Corsi disputes the academic consensus that oil is fossil fuel and says that dinosaurs cannot turn into oil. The scientific consensus is that oil is not formed from dinosaurs, but from fossilized plant remains. Corsi says that the scientific views of petroleum formation are accepted, because it would be "disastrous — both to oil companies and to politicians in office" in terms of pricing to admit that oil is not a scarce commodity.

=== Atomic Iran ===
In 2005 Corsi's Atomic Iran: How the Terrorist Regime Bought the Bomb and American Politicians was published by WND Books with an introduction by Craig R. Smith, chairman of the Board of Owens & Minor. In the book he claims Democratic politicians are corrupted by Iranian money and are helping the Iranian government, who he claims seeks nuclear weapons. Corsi accused an aide for John Kerry of helping the Iranian government, who strongly rejected the claim. To promote the book, Corsi appeared in conservative venues such as on Hannity & Colmes on April 8, 2005, at The Heritage Foundation, and on WEJEW Radio.

=== Where's the Birth Certificate? ===
Corsi wrote Where's the Birth Certificate?, a book that questions Obama's American citizenship. Prior to its May 2011 release, the book enjoyed a buzz-building teaser article in the heavily trafficked Drudge Report website, but Obama released his long-form birth certificate three weeks before the book was published. Shortly after the book's publication, Esquire issued a satirical report that the book had been recalled, which prompted Corsi to sue Esquire for damages of over $285 million. The lawsuit was dismissed in a United States district court in a decision stating that satire is protected by the First Amendment and noting, "Having become such well-known proponents of one position on the issue, plaintiffs cannot complain that the very intensity of their advocacy also became part of the public debate. Those who speak with loud voices cannot be surprised if they become part of the story."

Corsi continued to cast doubt on Obama's birth certificate during a March 2019 CNN interview, telling Anderson Cooper, "I want to see the original 1961 birth records from Kenya, that'll settle it...the State of Hawaii will not show those records to anyone.” Corsi's attorney, Larry Klayman, falsely asserted during the same interview, "the birth certificate uses the word ‘African-American’ in 1961.”

=== North American Union conspiracy theories ===
Corsi claimed that "President Bush is pursuing a globalist agenda to create a North American Union", a theoretical continental union of Canada, Mexico, and the United States, that will supplant the United States. In 2007, he predicted a new unit of currency, called the amero, which would replace the dollar for this union within ten years. The "Union" is a theme in two of his books The Late Great U.S.A.: The Coming Merger with Mexico and Canada (2007) and Minutemen: The Battle to Secure America's Borders (2006) as he explained on The Conservative Caucus's TV show.

The validity of those claims was criticized in Newsweek and the author noted: "Corsi offered a warning: President Bush's supposed determination to force North American integration, he told the audience, could cost the GOP the 2008 presidential election. Corsi may have a conspiratorial bent. But he sure knows how to spin stories that shake up an election – and at least one candidate seems happy to help him."

John Hawkins, a fellow writer for Human Events, responded: "Yesterday, Jerome Corsi was prattling on about the North American Union again after Michael Medved deservedly spanked him for spreading conspiracy theories. While I don't think Corsi is any more worthy of being taken seriously than those who think Jews rule the world or the 'Truthers' who think President Bush is responsible for 9/11, I thought I would respond to him one last time." Hawkins listed Corsi as number three on his list of "The Most Annoying People on the Right", and wrote: "Nobody has worked harder to convince people that the completely moronic North American conspiracy theory is real than the right's version of Dylan Avery, kooky Jerome Corsi." Additionally, conservative Hugh Hewitt said Corsi is "from the fringe".

=== 9/11 conspiracy theories ===
Corsi believes the official explanation of the 9/11 attacks on the World Trade Center to be false. He said:

The fire, from jet fuel, does not burn hot enough to produce the physical evidence that he’s produced. So when you’ve got science that the hypothesis doesn’t explain–evidence–then the hypothesis doesn’t stand anymore. It doesn’t mean there’s a new hypothesis you’ve validated. It just means the government’s explanation of the jet fuel fire is not a sufficient explanation to explain the evidence of these spheres–these microscopic spheres–that Steven Jones has proved existed within the W.T.C. dust.

In an interview with Alex Jones, Corsi discussed "the findings of Steven Jones, physicist and hero of the 9/11 Truth movement who claims to have evidence that the World Trade Center towers collapsed due to explosives inside the building, not just the planes hitting them, during the attacks". Corsi cited Jones's findings of microscopic forensic evidence that seemingly negated the U.S. government hypothesis that the aircraft's jet fuel-fed heat alone was sufficiently hot to collapse the steel superstructure of the buildings.

=== Hunting Hitler ===
On January 2, 2014, Corsi released his book Hunting Hitler: New Scientific Evidence That Hitler Escaped Nazi Germany. According to the publisher's description, the book explores claims made in 2009 by three U.S. professors who believe that Adolf Hitler did not die in 1945, and instead escaped Berlin. Roger Stone called it an "incredible book".

== Personal life ==
Corsi lives in Mooresville, North Carolina.

== Bibliography ==
- Corsi, Jerome Robert (1972). Prior Restraint, Prior Punishment, and Political Dissent: A Moral and Legal Evaluation. Boston, Massachusetts: Harvard University Press. OCLC 76982330.
- Lewis, Ralph G., and Jerome R. Corsi. To Make the World Safe for Picnics: The 1972 Political Conventions in Miami Beach. 1974
- O'Neill, John E., and Jerome R. Corsi. Unfit for Command: Swift Boat Veterans Speak Out Against John Kerry. Regnery Publishing, 2004. ISBN 0-89526-017-4.
- Corsi, Jerome R. (2005). Atomic Iran: How the Terrorist Regime Bought the Bomb and American Politicians. Nashville, Tennessee: WND Books. ISBN 978-1-58182-458-2. OCLC 57475793.
- Corsi, Jerome R.; Smith, Craig R. (2005). Black Gold Stranglehold: The Myth of Scarcity and the Politics of Oil. Nashville, Tennessee: WND Books. ISBN 978-1-58182-489-6. OCLC 61228601.
- Blackwell, Kenneth, and Jerome R. Corsi. Rebuilding America: A Prescription for Creating Strong Families, Building the Wealth of Working People, and Ending Welfare. WND Books, 2006. ISBN 1-58182-501-3
- Corsi, Jerome R. The Late Great U.S.A.: The Coming Merger With Mexico and Canada. WND Books, 2007, ISBN 0-9790451-4-2.
- Corsi, Jerome R. (2008). The Obama Nation: Leftist Politics and the Cult of Personality. Threshold Editions. ISBN 978-1-4165-9806-0.
- Corsi, Jerome Robert (2009). America for Sale: Fighting the New World Order, Surviving a Global Depression, and Preserving USA Sovereignty. Boston, Massachusetts: Threshold Editions. ISBN 978-1-4391-5477-9.
- Corsi, Jerome R. (2010). The Shroud Codex. Threshold Editions. ISBN 978-1-4391-9041-8.
- Corsi, Jerome Robert (2011). Where's the Birth Certificate?: The Case that Barack Obama is not Eligible to be President. WND Books. ISBN 978-1-936488-29-2.
- Corsi, Jerome R. (2012). Saul Alinsky: The Evil Genius Behind Obama. Paperless Publishing. ISBN 978-0-98465-864-0.
- Corsi, Jerome R. (2013). Who Really Killed Kennedy?: 50 Years Later: Stunning New Revelations About the JFK Assassination. WND Books. ISBN 978-1938067105. OCLC 858128054.
- Corsi, Jerome R. (2014). No Greater Valor: The Siege of Bastogne and the Miracle That Sealed Allied Victory. Nelson Books. ISBN 978-1-59555-521-2.
- Corsi, Jerome R. (2018). Killing the Deep State: The Fight to Save President Trump. Humanix Books. ISBN 978-1-63006-102-9.
- Corsi, Jerome R. (2020). Coup d'État: Exposing Deep State Treason and the Plan to Re-Elect President Trump. Post Hill Press. ISBN 9781642934380.
- Corsi, Jerome R. (2022). The Truth about Energy, Global Warming, and Climate Change: Exposing Climate Lies in an Age of Disinformation. Post Hill Press. ISBN 9781637582787.
- Corsi, Jerome R. (2023). The Truth about Neo-Marxism, Cultural Maoism, and Anarchy: Exposing Woke Insanity in an Age of Disinformation. Post Hill Press. ISBN 9781637585214.
- Corsi, Jerome R. (2024). The Anti-Globalist Manifesto: Ending the War on Humanity. War Room Books. ISBN 9781648211102.

== See also ==
- Swiftboating
- Timeline of Russian interference in the 2016 United States elections (July 2016 – election day)
- Timeline of investigations into Trump and Russia (July–December 2018)
- Timeline of investigations into Trump and Russia (2019–2020)
