= Unfit for Command =

2004 book by John O'Neill and Jerome Corsi

- Author: John E. O'Neill and Jerome Corsi
- Publisher: Regnery Publishing
- Publication date: August 2004
- Media type: Hardcover/Paperback
- ISBN: 0-89526-017-4
- OCLC: 56057932
- Dewey Decimal: 973.931/092 B 22
- LC Class: E840.8.K427 O54 2004

Unfit for Command: Swift Boat Veterans Speak Out Against John Kerry is a 2004 book about then U.S. Presidential candidate John Kerry by John O'Neill and Jerome Corsi published by Regnery Publishing. The book was released at the time that ads by Swift Vets and POWs for Truth were being aired on U.S. television.

== Content and criticism ==
The book criticizes Kerry's judgment in battle, his truthfulness, his entitlement to certain medals, and his later anti-war activities. The book was based in part on interviews with veterans who served in or with Kerry's division, and also on biographies of Kerry. Several members of Kerry's crew stated that O'Neill failed to interview them. Neither O'Neill nor Corsi had any firsthand knowledge of Kerry's service. O'Neill served on the Swift boats after Kerry left Vietnam and Corsi never served in Vietnam. According to the Swiftboat skipper who served with Kerry, the book was "wrong."

Kerry's fellow sailors released a point-by-point rebuttal of the claims and stated that "The book's authors don't give Kerry's supporters the space or the credence that they warrant." According to the Seattle Times, the government documents support Kerry's war awards and claims. Some veterans interviewed for the book complained that their statements were edited to strip out material favorable to Kerry.

At the same time the book was being criticized, the Swift Vets and POWs for Truth group was being criticized because "None of those in the attack ad by the Swift Boat group actually served on Kerry's boat. And their statements are contrary to the accounts of Kerry and those who served under him."

After controversial statements made by Corsi became public, O'Neill denied Corsi's coauthorship of the book, saying that Corsi was "simply an editor and not really any sort of co-author." However, portions of the book contain material also found in articles posted under Corsi's name at WinterSoldier.com, a website critical of John Kerry, and O'Neill is cited in a later book as describing Corsi as helping to write Unfit for Command, and urging him to back out of media appearances after the controversial comments became public.

== Controversy with publisher ==
In 2007 Corsi, along with several other authors, sued Regnery's parent company, Eagle Publishing, claiming the company "orchestrate[d] and participate[d] in a fraudulent, deceptively concealed and self-dealing scheme to divert book sales away from retail outlets and to wholly owned subsidiary organizations within the Eagle conglomerate." The suit was dismissed on June 30, 2008.

== 2008 election ==
Corsi published The Obama Nation in August 2008, criticizing then U.S. presidential candidate Barack Obama. Corsi's motivations behind its publication and book itself has been compared to Unfit for Command and criticized as unsubstantiated, misleading, or inaccurate. In response, the Obama campaign issued a 40-page rebuttal called Unfit for Publication, a play on the title of Corsi's 2004 book, on his website FightTheSmears.com, alleging serious factual errors.

== See also ==
- John Kerry presidential campaign, 2004
- Swift Vets and POWs for Truth
