= Tom Fitton =

American activist (born 1968)

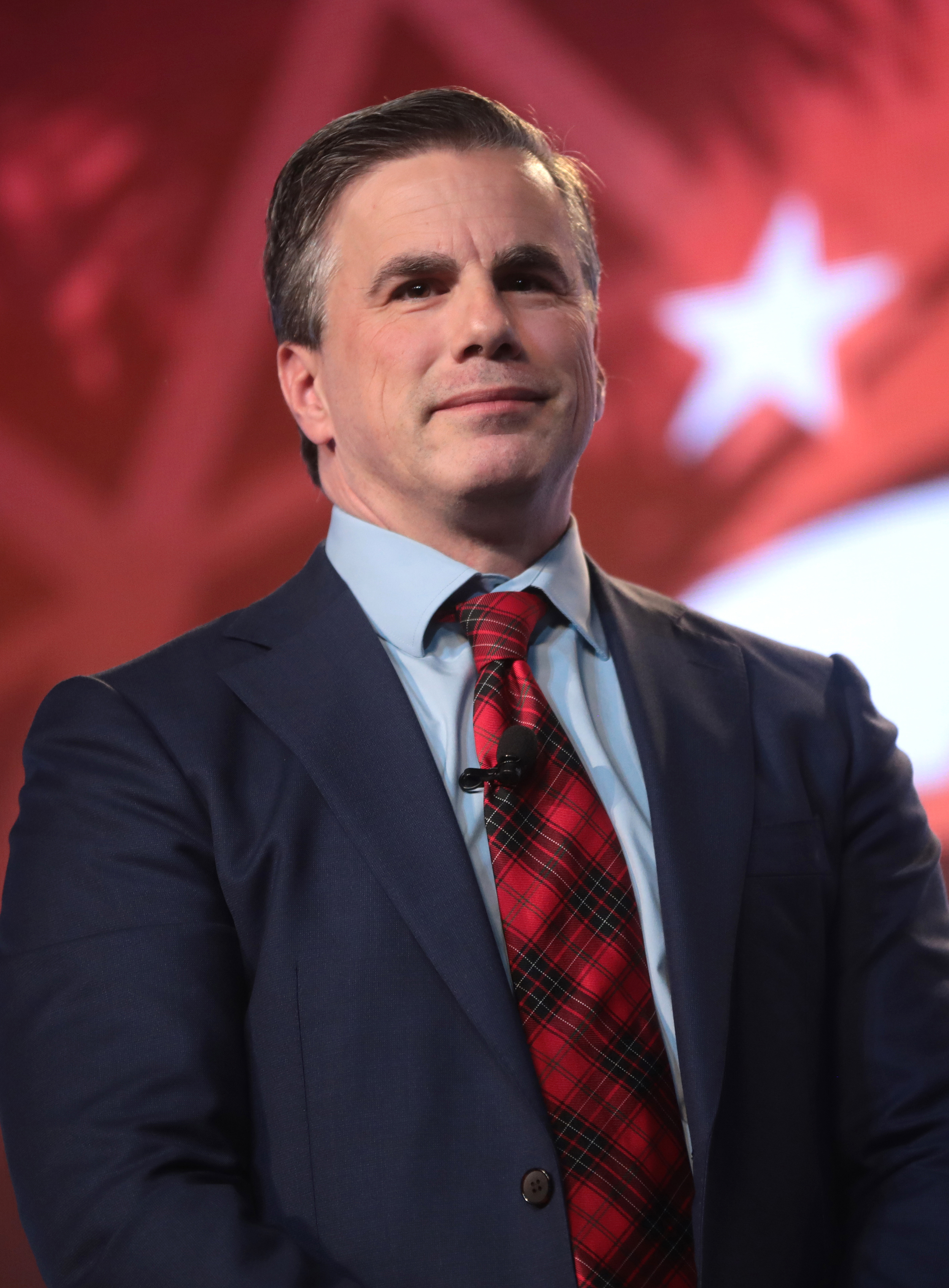
- Born: May 30, 1968 (age 58); West Nyack, New York, U.S.
- Education: George Washington University (BA)
- Occupation: Activist
- Title: President of Judicial Watch
- Movement: American conservatism

Thomas J. Fitton (born May 30, 1968) is an American conservative activist and the president of Judicial Watch.

Fitton is a senior member of the Council for National Policy, a conservative umbrella organization for groups such as Judicial Watch. Fitton is the current president of the Council for National Policy, taking up the role in February 2022.

Under his leadership, Judicial Watch has become one of the most active users of the Freedom of Information Act (FOIA), filing thousands of requests and hundreds of lawsuits seeking government transparency and accountability since 1998.

== Early life ==
Fitton was born on May 30, 1968, in West Nyack, New York. His father was a manager at a supermarket and his mother was a nurse. He graduated from Clarkstown High School South in 1986. Fitton has a bachelor's degree in English from George Washington University.

== Judicial Watch ==
Fitton has been the president of Judicial Watch since August 1998. The group primarily seeks access to government records by filing Freedom of Information Act (FOIA) and other public records act lawsuits and engaging in other forms of civil litigation.

In 2006, Larry Klayman, Judicial Watch's former chairman, attempted to reclaim control of Judicial Watch by suing Fitton, the organization, and its other officers and directors. Most of Klayman's claims, including all of the claims against Fitton and Judicial Watch's other officers and directors, were dismissed in 2009.

On October 2, 2020, it was announced that Trump intended to appoint Fitton to the D.C. Commission on Judicial Disabilities and Tenure. He was officially appointed on November 10, 2020, and his term ends on July 29, 2025.

== Views ==
=== Climate change ===
Fitton rejects the scientific consensus on climate change (global warming). He said, "There has been scandal after scandal involving climate data and we are skeptical of government agencies that won't tell people what they are up to.... I’m sure scientists are concerned that funding for dubious research will be cut, but the truth will win out in the end." Judicial Watch, which has claimed that climate science is "fraud science," has filed lawsuits seeking to force the National Oceanic and Atmospheric Administration (NOAA) to release the correspondence of climate scientists who published a 2015 study in the journal Science. The study had debunked one of the common claims made by climate change deniers: that there had been global warming "hiatus" from 1998 to 2012. The Climate Science Legal Defense Fund (CSLDF), American Meteorological Society, and Union of Concerned Scientists condemned Judicial Watch by saying that the disclosure of private communications between scientists "would harm (or halt altogether) government scientists' ability to collaborate with colleagues, damage the government's ability to recruit or retain top scientists, and deter critically important research into politically charged fields like climate change." The Judicial Watch lawsuit was inspired by US Representative Lamar Smith, who accused the authors of the study of "alter[ing] data" to "get the politically correct results they want."

=== Support for Breitbart News ===
Judicial Watch has advertised for years on Breitbart News, the far-right website formerly run by Steve Bannon. The site was defended by Fitton against calls for advertisers to drop them for advertising. Fitton stated, "Liberal activists want to destroy Breitbart, but we won't be cowed."

=== Voting fraud ===
Fitton said about voter fraud: "We have all heard about voter fraud and the attempts by liberal media organs like the New York Times and Ivory Tower academics to dismiss it as a nonexistent problem. But it is real, widespread, and substantial to the point that it can decide elections." Fitton has baselessly alleged that hundreds of thousands of undocumented immigrants voted in the 2018 midterm elections. Voting fraud is exceedingly rare.

On February 3, 2020, the day of the Iowa caucuses in the Democratic presidential primary, Fitton suggested that voter fraud was afoot in Iowa by falsely claiming that "eight Iowa counties have more voter registrations than citizens old enough to register." Iowa's secretary of state, Paul Pate, a member of the Republican Party, debunked Fitton's claim by linking to official voter registration data.

In a video recording released in October 2020, in the lead-up to the 2020 election, Fitton called on fellow conservative activists at a conference to come up with ways to prevent mail-in-ballots from being distributed to voters.

At the Conservative Political Action Conference in February 2021, Fitton falsely claimed that on the day of the 2020 United States presidential election, "President Trump had the votes to win the presidency. These vote totals were changed because of unprecedented and extraordinary counting after election day".

Fitton has been identified as unindicted co-conspirator #1 in the Georgia state indictment of Donald Trump and 18 other defendants for their attempts to overturn the 2020 presidential election. He is described in the indictment as having written a speech for Trump prior to the election in which Trump would falsely attribute his loss to voter fraud.

=== Russian interference in the 2016 election ===
In 2017, Judicial Watch helped to stoke Republican attacks against Special Counsel Robert Mueller's investigation into Russian interference in the 2016 election. He has referred to the Mueller probe as a "coup" against Trump. Trump retweeted Fitton's remarks about a coup; PolitiFact rated the assertion that the Mueller probe was a coup as "pants-on-fire" false. Trump frequently listens to Fitton and had mentioned Fitton at least five times in his tweets by August 2018, including a promotion of an upcoming Fitton appearance on Fox. According to Politico, "Fitton's rhetoric is often indistinguishable from Trump's." Fitton called for the Special Counsel investigation to be shut down and argued that prosecutors in the probe were too biased against Trump to conduct a credible investigation. Fitton furthermore called for shutting down the Federal Bureau of Investigation "because it was turned into a KGB-type operation by the Obama administration." Newsweek rated the claim "false", stating that "there is no comparison between the FBI and KGB."

When Michael Cohen, Trump's former personal attorney, pleaded guilty to crimes brought to light by Special Counsel Robert Mueller's probe in December 2018, Fitton dismissed the importance of the crimes. Fitton said it was "weak tea" and intended "to make President Trump look bad."

=== COVID-19 pandemic ===
During the COVID-19 pandemic, Fitton called on Trump to "reopen" the United States amid social distancing and lockdowns to prevent spread of the virus. Fitton criticized Dr. Anthony Fauci, the White House's leading epidemiology expert, and amplified right-wing conspiracy theories about Fauci.

At an August 2020 meeting of the Council for National Policy, Fitton claimed that people on the American left are planning to delay the 2020 election tally until January 20, 2021, to allow House Speaker Nancy Pelosi to become acting president. He later added that "it could cause civil war".

=== Trump documents case ===
Upon leaving office in January 2021, Trump took numerous boxes of government documents to his Mar-a-Lago home in Florida. Some of the documents were classified top secret. Trump declined requests from the National Archives and the Justice Department (DOJ) to return the documents, leading the DOJ to subpoena them. Trump attorney Chris Kise advised Trump to quietly negotiate a settlement to return the documents to avoid being indicted. Trump instead took the advice of Fitton, who told the former president he was legally entitled to keep the documents. Fitton and Trump cited the so-called "Clinton socks case" in which Judicial Watch sued the Archives in 2012 to gain access to audio recordings former president Bill Clinton had made with an historian during his presidency, arguing they were presidential records subject to the Presidential Records Act (PRA); federal judge Amy Berman Jackson dismissed the suit, finding the recordings were not subject to the PRA. The FBI enforced the DOJ subpoena by retrieving the documents from Mar-a-Lago in August 2022. Despite incorrectly insisting the PRA allowed him to keep the documents, in June 2023 Trump was federally indicted on multiple counts of mishandling government documents, including violations of the Espionage Act. The case was dismissed in its entirety on July 15, 2024 by U.S. district judge Aileen Cannon. This decision has been appealed to the ninth district court almost immediately.

== Awards ==
Fitton received the American Conservative Union's 'Defender of the Constitution Award' during its annual Conservative Political Action Conference (CPAC) in 2015.

== Works ==
- Fitton, Tom (2014). The Corruption Chronicles: Obama's Big Secrecy, Big Corruption, and Big Government. New York: Threshold Editions. ISBN 978-1-4767-6705-5.
- Fitton, Tom Clean House: Exposing Our Government's Secrets and Lies (New York: Threshold Editions, 2016). ISBN 978-1-5011-3704-4
- Fitton, Tom (2020). A Republic Under Assault: The Left's Ongoing Attack On American Freedom. New York: Threshold Editions. ISBN 978-1-9821-6365-5.
