= Protests against Executive Order 13769 =

2017 demonstrations against US travel ban

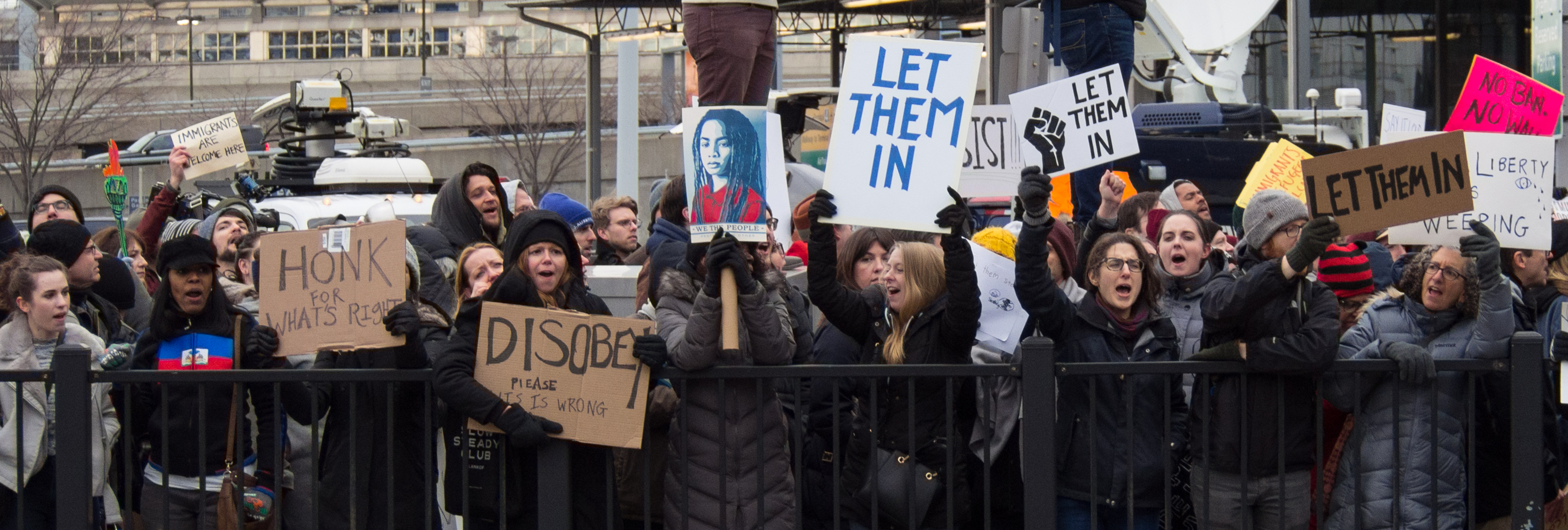
- Protesters holding signs outside John F. Kennedy International Airport's Terminal 4
- Date: January – February 2017
- Location: Various airports across the United States
- Caused by: Executive Order 13769
- Goals: Repeal Executive Order 13769
- Methods: Nonviolent protest

In late January and early February 2017, during protests against Executive Order 13769, commonly referred to as the “Muslim ban,” thousands of people gathered at various airports in the United States and around the world to protest the attempt by the Trump administration to prevent the prohibition of refugees and visitors from seven countries considered by the administration to be unsafe. According to various sources, more than two thousand people were at the protest at John F. Kennedy International Airport in Queens, New York City with other protests appearing at significant international airports and other important sites around the United States. Protests continued daily and internationally through February 6. Protests also continued after a federal judge issued a temporary restraining order against parts of the travel ban.

== Background ==
On January 27, President Trump signed an executive order which created a suspension of admissions of all refugees entering the United States for 120 days and an indefinite block for Syrian refugees. The order also blocked citizens from Iran, Iraq, Libya, Sudan, Syria, and Yemen from entering the U.S. for 90 days. Green card holders from these countries were also affected.

Approximately 27 air passengers coming into airports around the United States were either detained or sent home on January 28. By January 29, an estimated 375 travelers had been affected by the order. Two Iraqi detainees were released from John F. Kennedy International Airport (JFK Airport) in New York City, and as of 6 p.m. (local) 11 remained. On January 29, there were still two detainees left inside the airport. One was Hameed Jhalid Darweesh, an Iraqi interpreter for the United States Army. Darweesh was held for twelve hours without being allowed to see his lawyers. Two elderly and disabled Iranian citizens with green cards were detained for hours at Washington Dulles International Airport. President Trump told the Christian Broadcasting Network (CBN) that Christian refugees will be given priority in terms of refugee status in the United States.

== Protests ==
The first protest started at New York City's John F. Kennedy International Airport. Protests quickly started at other airports nationwide, including Chicago's O'Hare International Airport, Los Angeles International Airport (LAX), San Francisco International Airport, Baltimore/Washington International Airport Seattle's SeaTac Airport, and in airports in Indianapolis, Boston, Denver, Albuquerque, Hartford, Newark, Albany, New York, and San Diego. Also planned were Atlanta, Houston, Las Vegas, Orlando, Greenville and Philadelphia.

Protesters were mobilized mainly through the use of social media.

Protests and walkouts continued in February. On February 2, thousands of Comcast employees in Portland, Washington, D.C., Philadelphia and Sunnyvale walked off the job in protest of the executive order.

A later series of protests occurred in Europe and Asia on February 4.

=== New York City ===
'Trump Immigration Order Sparks Protests at NY Airport' report from Voice of America

The protest started January 28, with a small group of around thirty people sometime near 11 a.m. EST. Protesters gathered in front of Terminal 4, where international arrivals take place. As advocacy groups, such as the New York Immigration Coalition, called out to protesters on social media, the crowd grew. The protesters were gathered to denounce Trump's executive order and to show support for refugees and immigrants. The demonstration grew large enough by sunset that it spread into the parking deck near the terminal. Demonstrators brought signs, chanted slogans and called the action a "Muslim ban". The protesters marched from terminal to terminal. Throughout the day, state representatives, Nydia Velázquez and Jerry Nadler were present to help constituents affected by the ban.

A companion protest sprang up on Staten Island in the evening, taking place in Port Richmond. Another protest took place at Battery Park on Sunday. Chelsea Clinton was one of the protesters at that location. There were several thousand protesters at Battery Park. Protests continued at JFK Airport on Sunday as well.

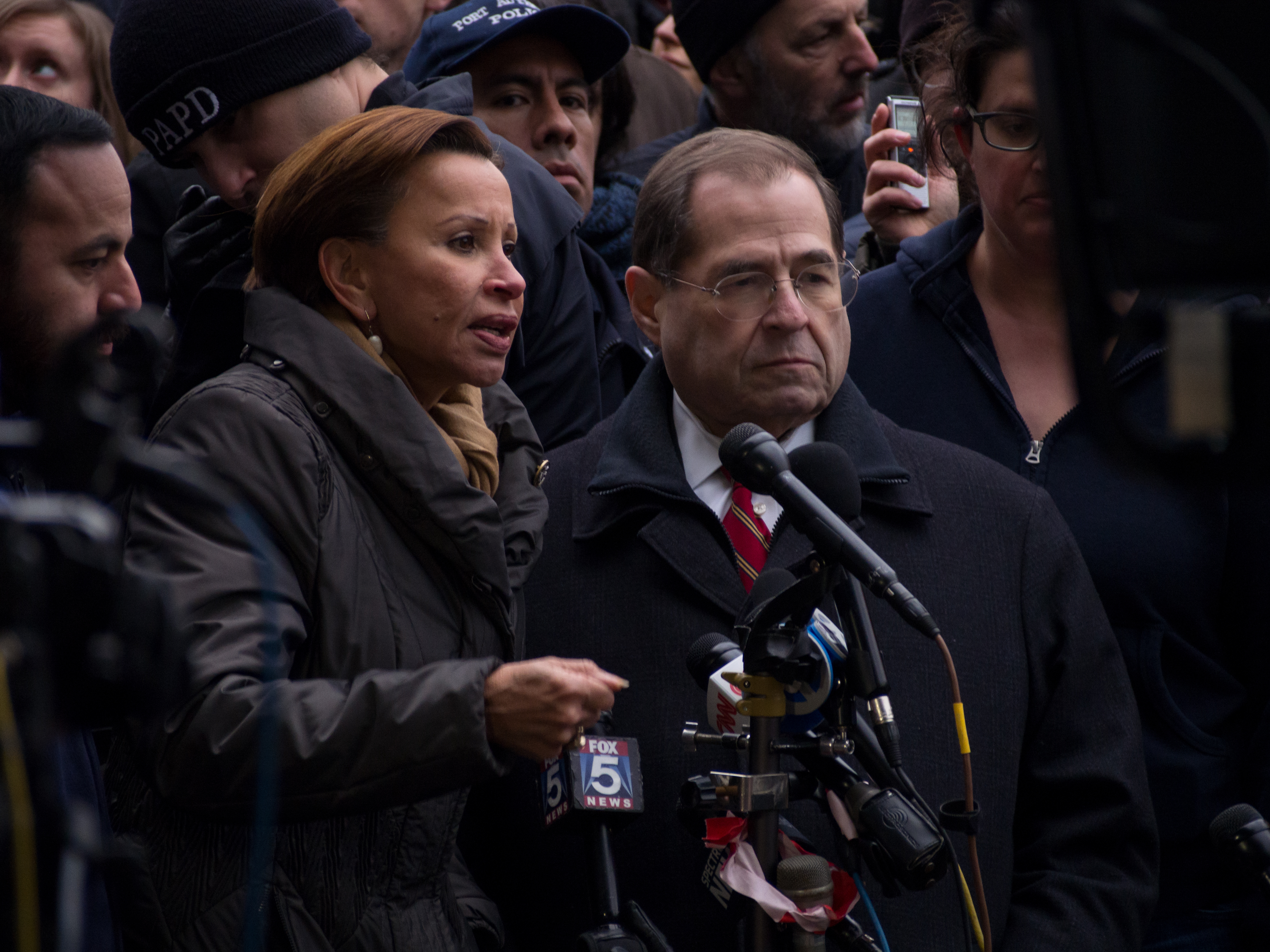
Nydia Velázquez and Jerry Nadler giving a press conference at the protest

Other groups involved in the protest included Make the Road New York, Jews for Racial and Economic Justice (JFREJ), Black Latino Asian Caucus members. The Hebrew Immigrant Aid Society (HIAS) was also involved in the protests, having expressed anger that the executive order, which would have harmed the prospects of Muslim refugees, was signed on International Holocaust Remembrance Day, and groups of Jews broke Sabbath to join the protests. From 6 to 7 p.m., taxi drivers of the New York Taxi Workers Alliance (NYTWA) stopped picking up passengers at the JFK airport in protest of those detained. The taxi boycott resulted in increase Uber pricing as a result of its dynamic pricing model. In the evening, the police were turning away anyone without airplane tickets from using the AirTrain. After 8 p.m., Governor Andrew Cuomo asked that people be allowed to board the Air Train once again.

Late in the evening on January 28, Ann Donnelly, a Federal District court judge in Brooklyn for the United States District Court for the Eastern District of New York, blocked part of the executive order, "providing immediate relief to dozens stranded at airports around the country." In the U.S. District Courts in Seattle and Virginia, similar rulings were made. This emergency stay will allow affected individuals with valid visas to stay in the US. However, lawyers from the American Civil Liberties Union and Zachary Manfredi from Yale's Worker and Immigrant Rights Advocacy Clinic caution that individuals detained at the airports could still be transferred to different detention facilities. Reports coming from midnight, January 28, indicated that Legal Aid lawyers were still not given access to clients being held inside of JFK. In Brooklyn, demonstrators waited outside the Federal District court as the case was being decided. Additionally, two Iraqi men who had been detained have filed lawsuits on January 28 against both Trump and the United States government over the issue. (Note: See Legal challenges to Executive Order 13769)

President Donald Trump was quoted as saying that his executive order's ban is "working out very nicely. You see it at the airports, you see it all over." Former New York City mayor Rudy Giuliani said President Trump had come to him for guidance over the ruling, which Giuliani described as a "Muslim ban".

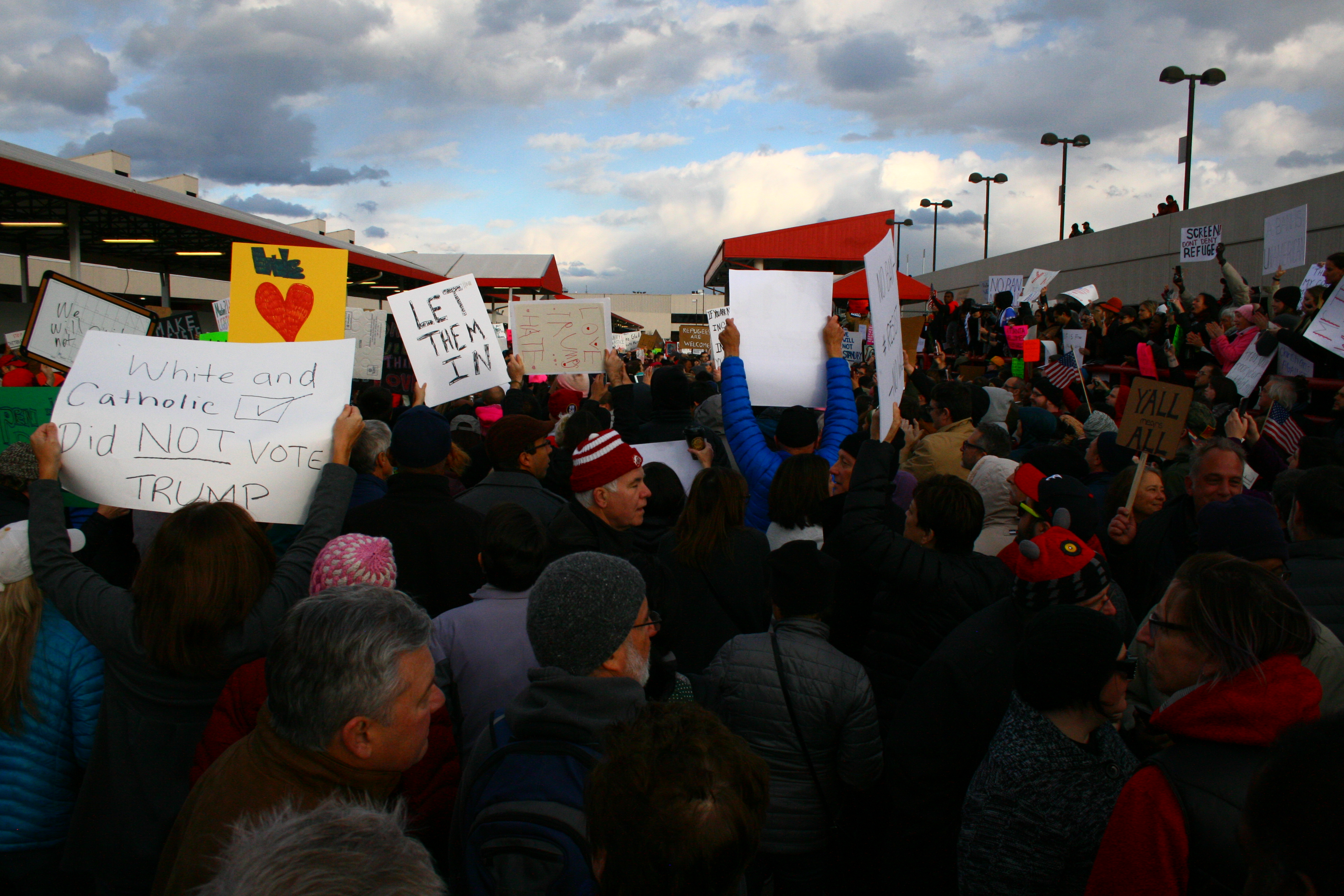
Protests on January 29 at Hartsfield-Jackson Atlanta International Airport

=== Atlanta ===
On January 29, about two thousand people gathered outside of the domestic terminal at Hartsfield–Jackson Atlanta International Airport to protest the ban and the detention of 11 airplane passengers taken into custody the previous day. The detained individuals included a 10-year-old girl and an elderly woman. Civil rights activist John Lewis and Georgia State Representative Stacey Abrams participated in the protest. Atlanta mayor Kasim Reed was also on site to speak to the media, although he did not join the demonstration. During the protest, Reed announced that the 11 people detained at the airport had been released.

=== Baltimore ===
Over 2,000 protesters arrived at Baltimore/Washington International Airport (BWI) on Sunday, January 29, 2017 to protest the Trump immigration order. The protest was held at the reception area for international arrivals, and filled the entire two floors of the atrium. Calls for protests to be held at Baltimore/Washington International Airport appeared on social media early Sunday for that evening, inspired by the protests at JFK Airport. The protests were called for 5pm, and lasted several hours into the night. Protestors arrived from across the Baltimore-Washington D.C. region, and were of every ethnicity and religion including a noticeable presence of religious Jews from Pikesville, Maryland. Lawyers were present to provide legal services to refugees and green-card holders. No foreign arrivals were known to be detained at BWI airport on January 29, 2017. The protest was attended by notable members of Maryland government and members of United States Congress. The protests were peaceful and ended without incident, inviting a response on social media from BWI thanking protesters for a safe protest.

=== California ===
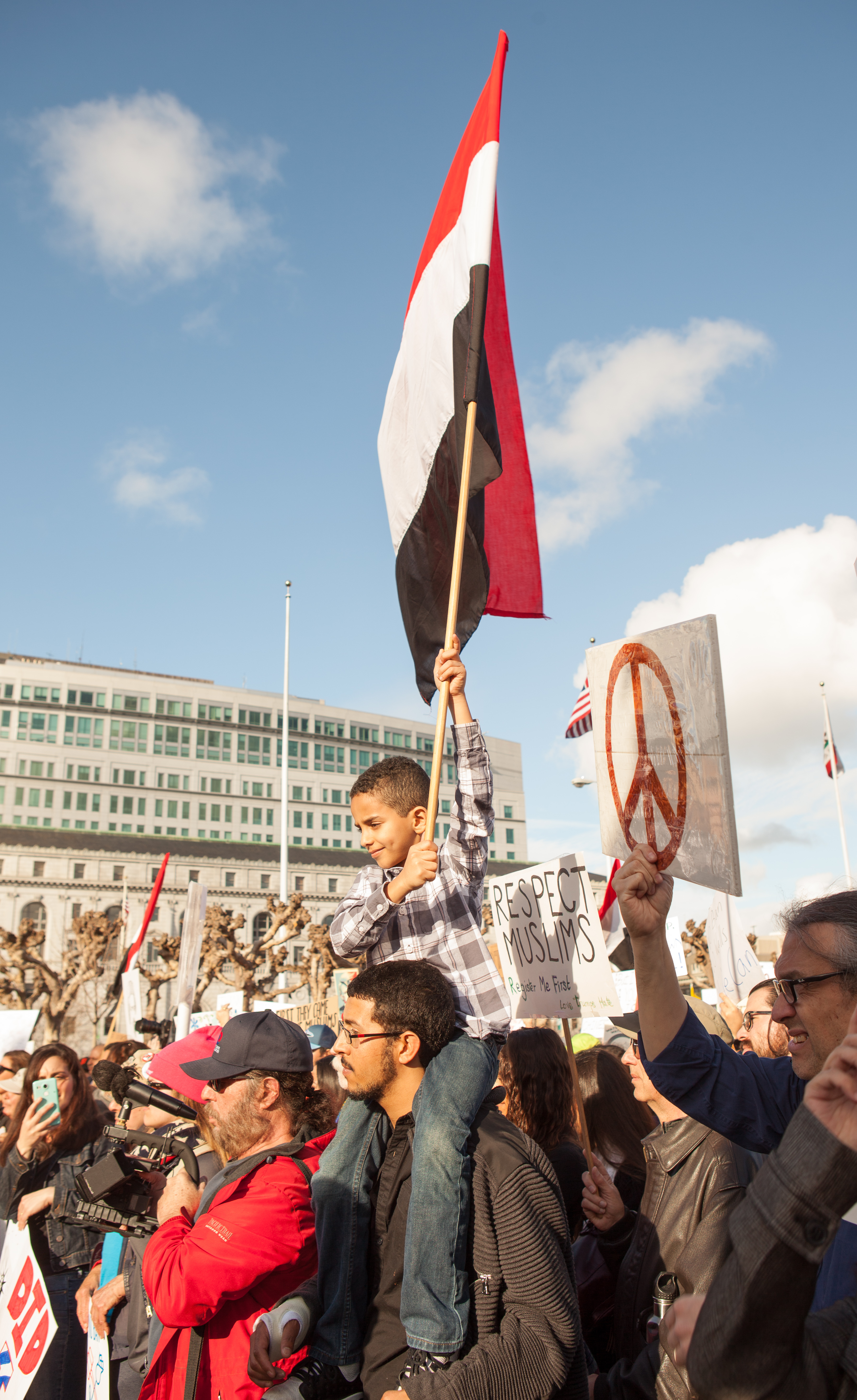
Protesters in San Francisco with Yemeni national flag in support of the Muslim community of Yemen and other countries affected by the executive order

The protest in Los Angeles initially saw around 200 protesters on Saturday. Protesters marched and chanted, growing to 400 people by 7:30 p.m., when word came that Federal judges had stayed the executive order. Seven people had been detained in the LAX because of the executive order. Attorneys specializing in immigration law created a "makeshift office" in the Bradley Terminal to help travelers in need.

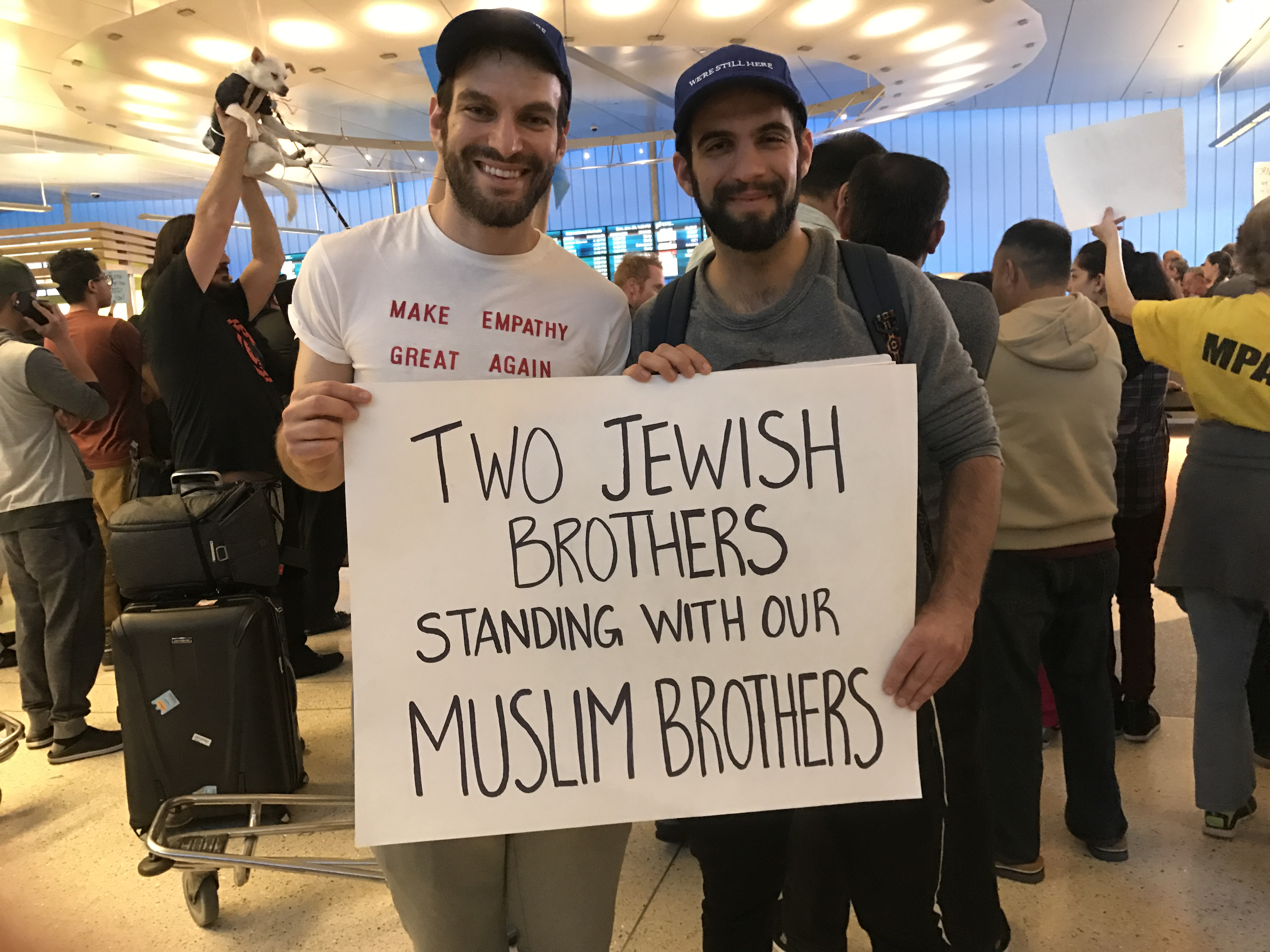
(1/29/17) Solidarity at Los Angeles International Airport

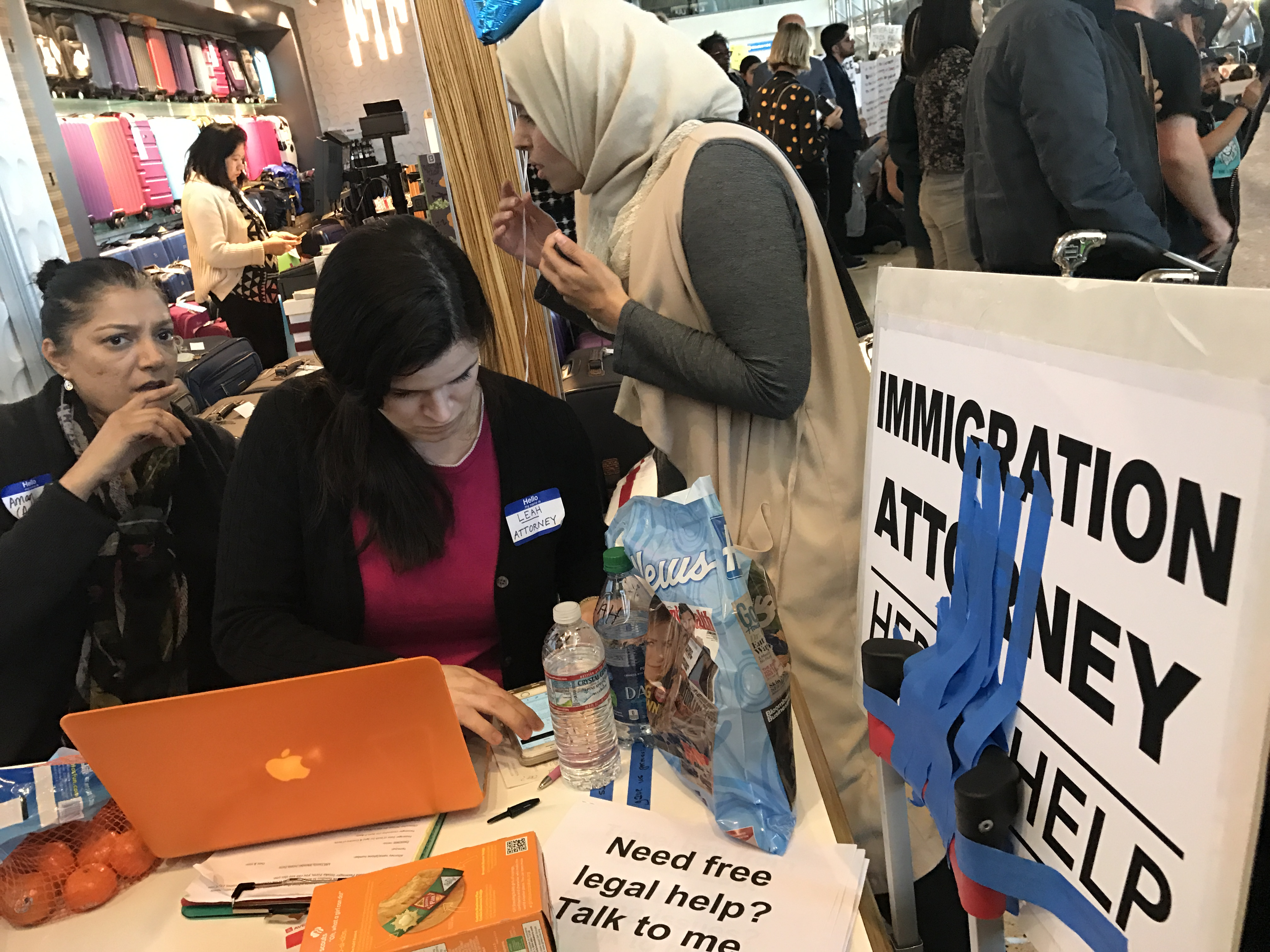
Free Legal Muslim Ban Protest

The protest at the Los Angeles International Airport grew to thousands of people who filled the Tom Bradley International Terminal and spilling out to the street.

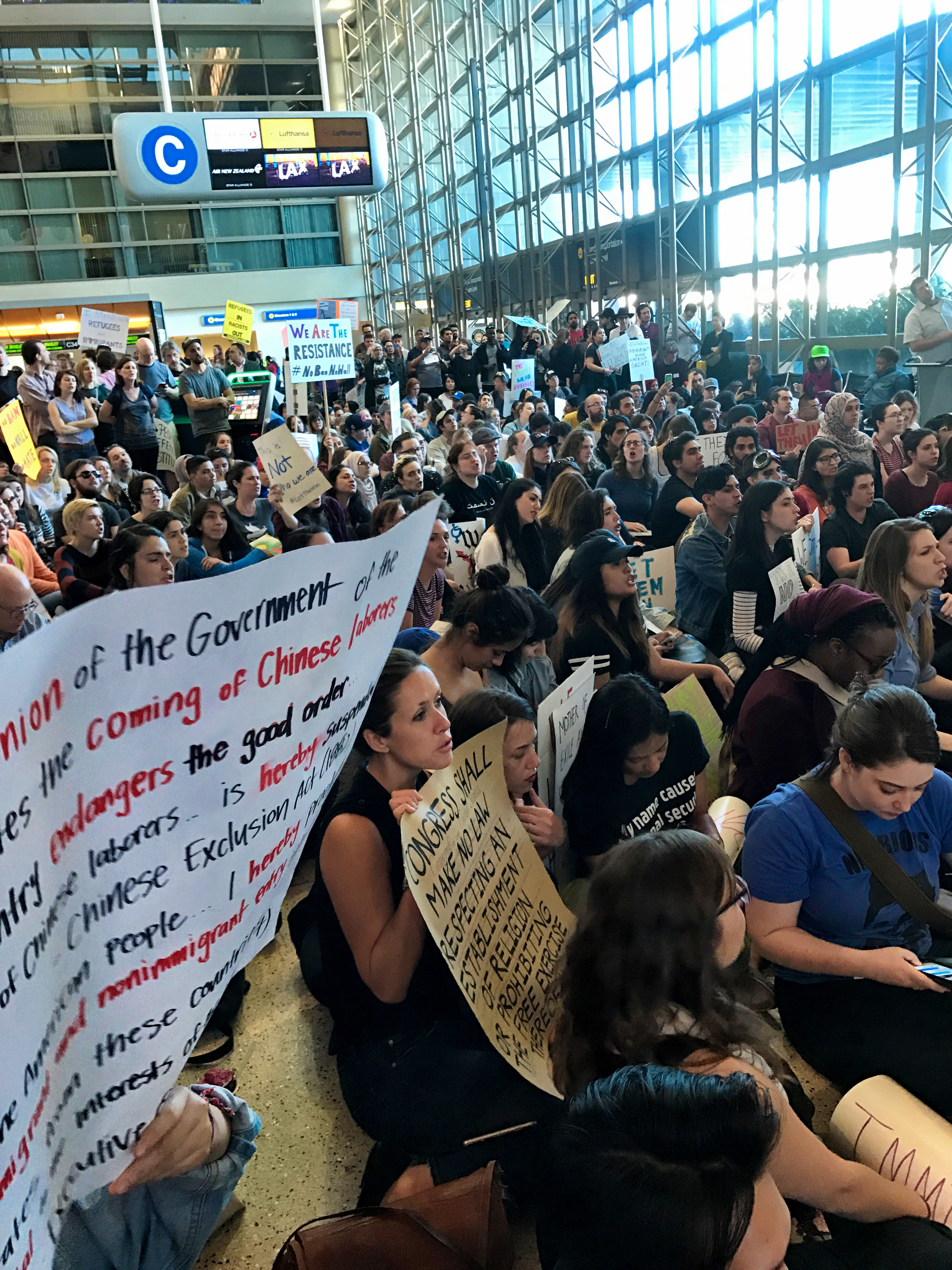
Sit Down at Los Angeles International Airport (LAX) to Protest Trump's Muslim Travel Ban.

The local ABC News station said about four thousand protesters were there again to protest on Sunday. A smaller group of counter-protesters also showed up at the airport, and the resulting clash caused the road next to Terminal 3 to be shut down for an hour. Later on Sunday, World Way was blocked when protesters sat down and refused to move until all people detained in the airport were released. By 10 p.m. two protesters had been arrested for blocking traffic, then cited and released. Los Angeles Mayor Eric Garcetti promised the city would be a refuge for all people. Because of the protest, some travelers leaving Los Angeles missed their flights.

On Sunday, protesters in Sacramento started demonstrating in Terminal B of the Sacramento International Airport. The city's mayor, Darrell Steinberg, was on hand and said, "Mr. Trump, we will fight you every step of the way." Some Sacramento protesters were heckled by those who agreed with the executive order.

Protesters at San Francisco International Airport

At the San Francisco International Airport (SFO), about a thousand protesters showed up in support of refugees. Initially, US Customs and Border Protection denied holding any travellers at the airport. Five travellers had been detained and each was released by Sunday afternoon. The protest blocked the International arrival area in front of the airport and closed the street. California Lieutenant Governor Gavin Newsom and Google co-founder Sergey Brin attended the SFO protest. Around 60 people had gathered by 6am Sunday morning to demonstrate at SFO. By noon the crowd had returned to its earlier size of around a thousand protesters.

San Diego saw two days of protest at San Diego International Airport. On Sunday there were about a thousand protesters at Terminal 2 around 5 p.m.

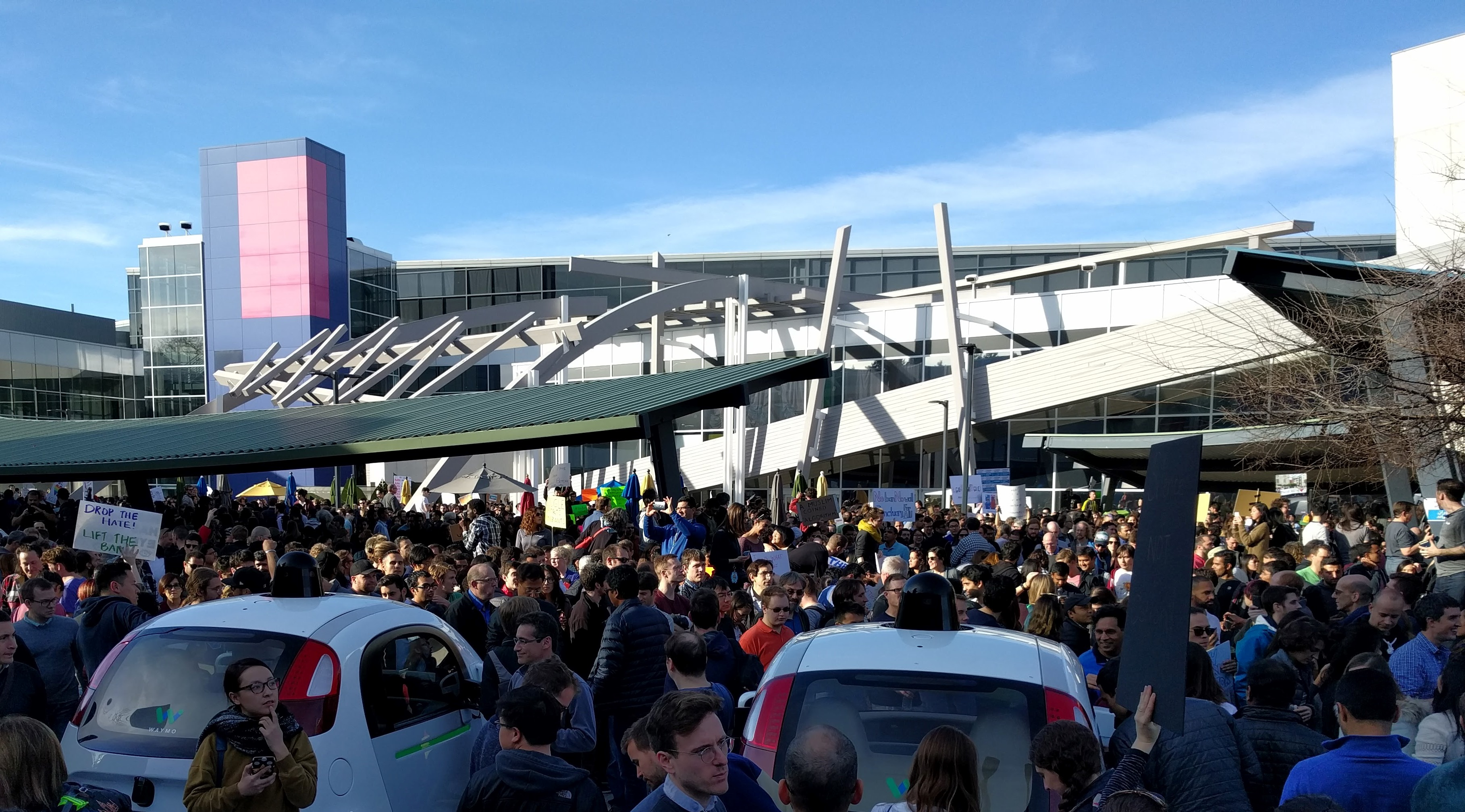
Protesters at Google's headquarters in Mountain View, California. Waymo's self-driving cars appear in the foreground.

On January 30 about two thousand employees of Google staged a protest in the company's headquarters, Googleplex in Mountain View, as well as seven of its other offices.

On February 4, thousands of protesters attended a rally at San Francisco Civic Center.

=== Chicago ===
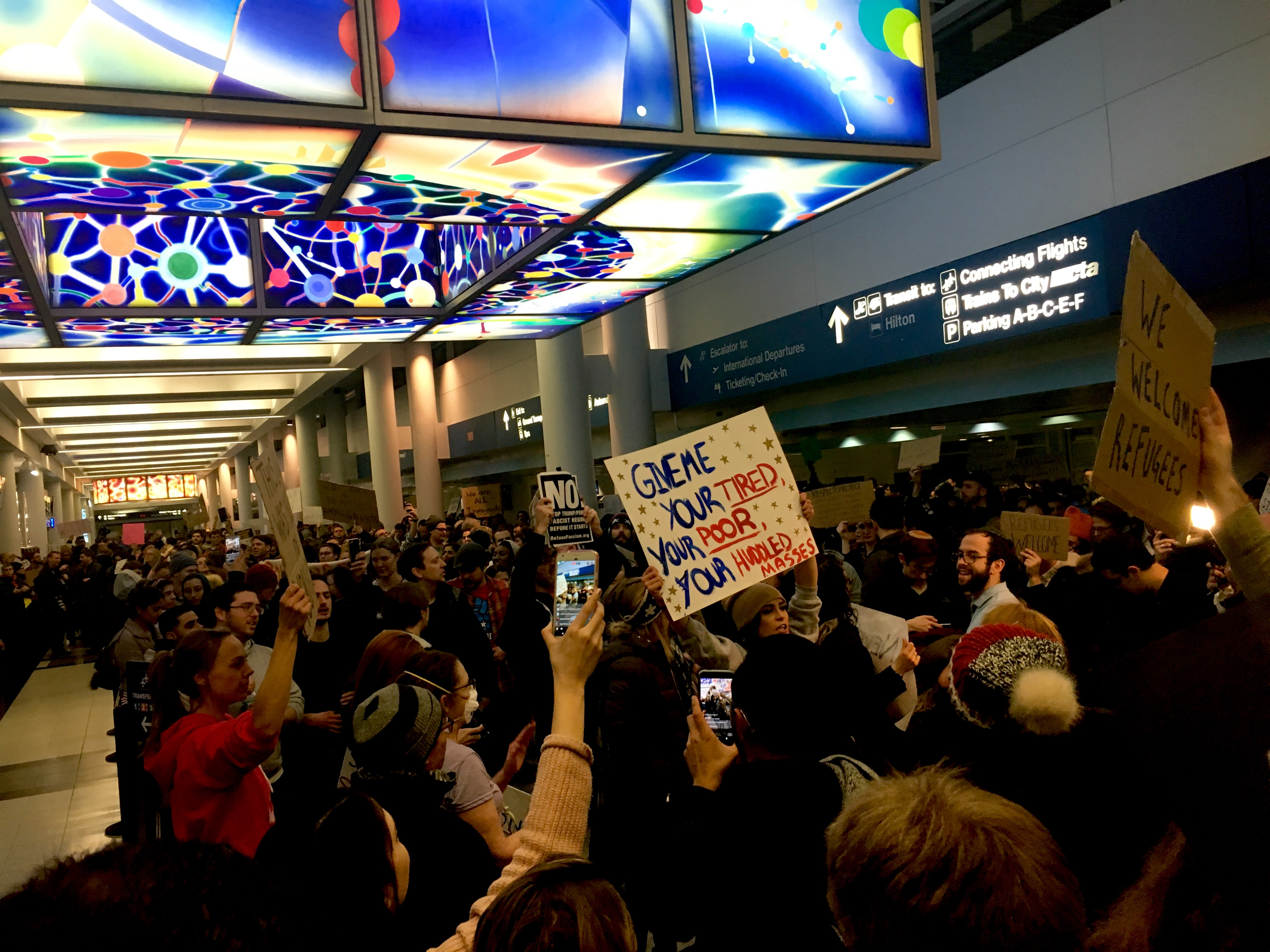
Protesters at Chicago's O'Hare International Airport

In Chicago, hundreds of protesters showed up at O'Hare International Airport to protest the detention of 17 travelers. By Saturday night, there were more than a thousand people present and traffic was shut down near Terminal 5. Eighteen travelers had been detained Saturday; all were finally released. On Sunday, at least another 50 were kept for additional questioning. Mayor Rahm Emanuel, Representatives Jan Schakowsky and Elaine Nekritz were there to support the demonstration. Protests at O'Hare slowed down somewhat during the day on Sunday only to begin again both inside and outside around 6 p.m. By 7 p.m. there were hundreds of protesters at the airport.

=== Detroit ===
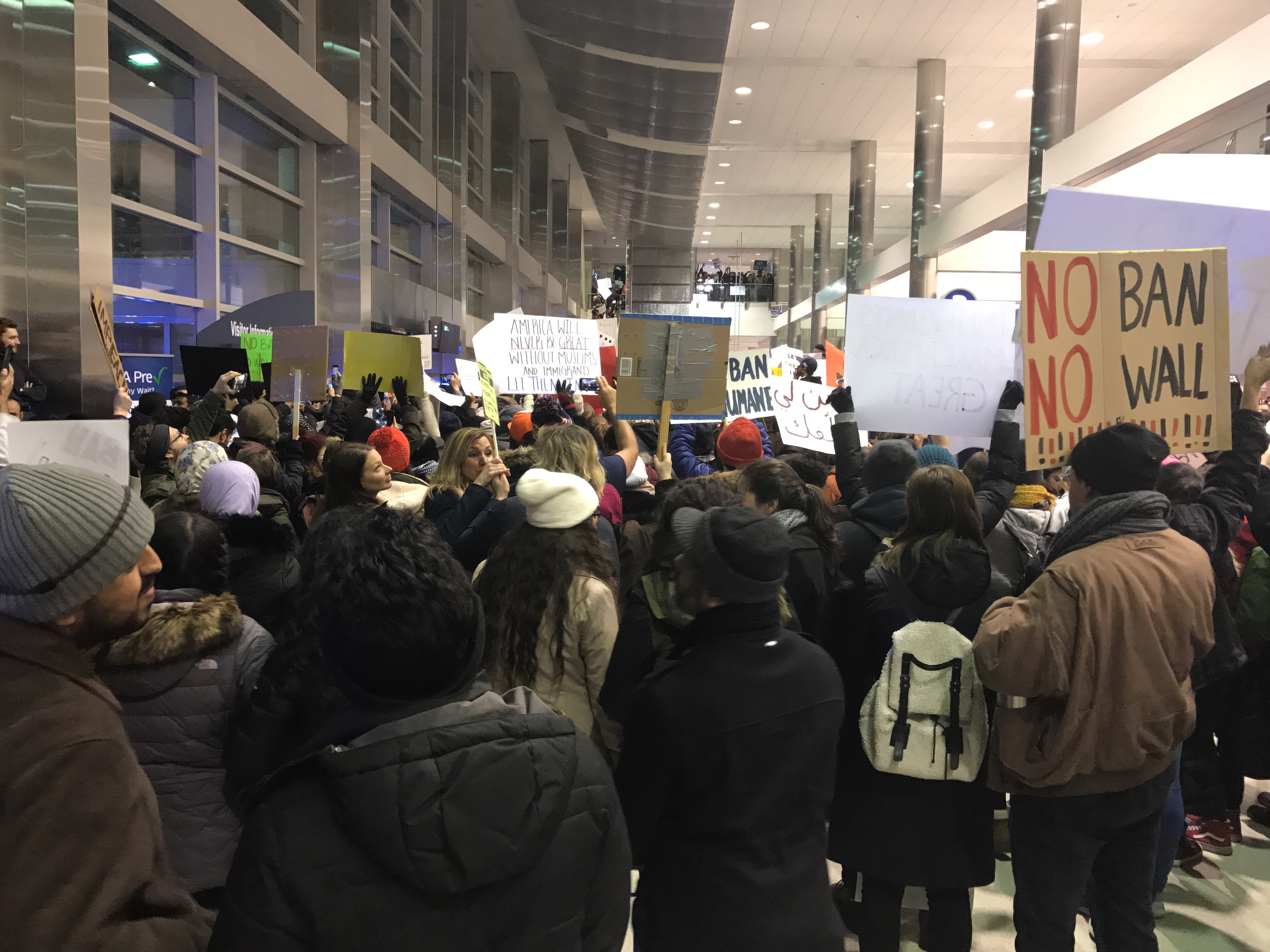
Protests against Executive Order 13769 at Detroit Metropolitan airport. Banner saying "no ban no wall" can be seen which became a very popular slogan and online hashtag during the protests.

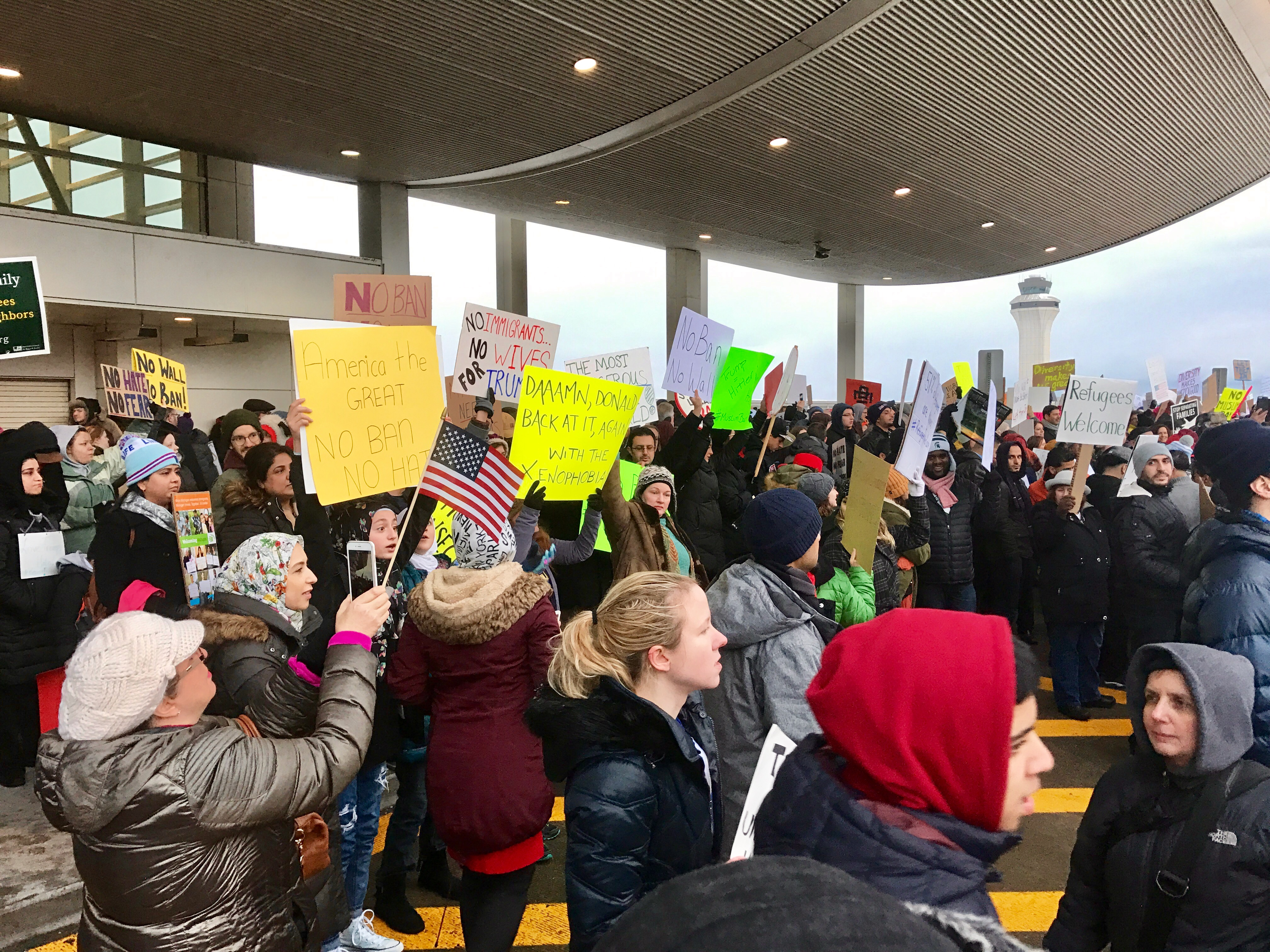
Protesters in Detroit

People and organizations in Detroit organized a protest on January 29 at the Metropolitan Airport which drew an estimated 2,500 prostestors. Hundreds turned out in protests in the nearby suburbs of Dearborn and Hamtramck, which have significant Muslim American and immigrant populations. Protesters demonstrated as snow fell and the Detroit Free Press reported that their voices "could be above the roar of jet engines." The airport's Authority Public Safety team coordinated with protest organizers to ensure the protest would be safe and that the demonstrators could be heard. No one was arrested.

=== Indianapolis ===
In Indianapolis, author John Green, Representative Andre Carson, and Senator Joe Donnelly attended a protest at Indianapolis International Airport.

=== Maine ===
On January 29, more than two thousand protesters, including the mayor and other officials and politicians, gathered at the airport in Portland to protest the travel ban. A smaller rally was also held in Bangor.

=== Massachusetts ===
Mayor Marty Walsh and Senator Elizabeth Warren joined the protest in Boston at the Logan International Airport.

In Cambridge at the Massachusetts Institute of Technology (MIT), around 200 students staged a demonstration on Sunday in solidarity with classmates like engineering student, Niki Mossafer Rahmati, who were affected by the ban.

=== Ohio ===
About a thousand protesters in Cleveland demonstrated at the Cleveland Hopkins International Airport on Sunday.

On Monday, January 30, protesters against the executive order in Columbus were sprayed with pepper spray by police when they would not disperse. There were hundreds of demonstrators on Monday night which started at the Statehouse.

=== Orlando ===
About a thousand people held a demonstration at 1:30 p.m. inside the Orlando International Airport's Terminal B. The demonstration included Florida State Representatives Carlos Guillermo Smith and Amy Mercado. Although there was a significant police presence, there were no incidents, arrests, or disruptions of any airport activities. This was the first demonstration ever staged at the Orlando International Airport. One Iranian and two Syrians were held by customs officers at the airport for roughly seven hours.

=== Philadelphia ===
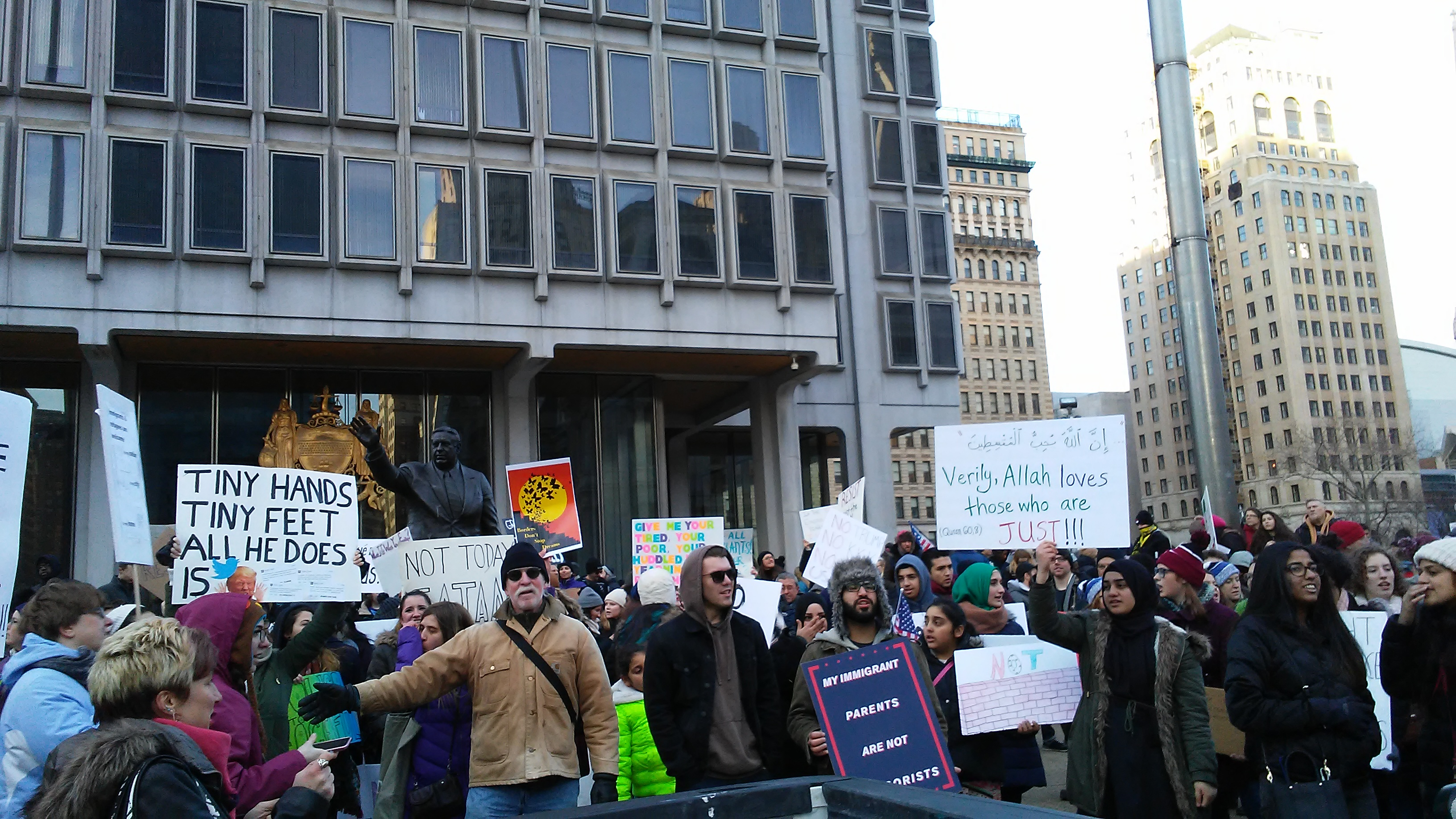
Protesters in Philadelphia

Four to five thousand people held a demonstration between 2 and 5 p.m. at Philadelphia International Airport's Terminal A. Speakers included U.S. Representative Bob Brady, members of Philadelphia City Council, and airport employees. The demonstration had the support of Governor Tom Wolf who had met with Syrian refugee families whose relatives had been sent back to the Middle East after over the weekend. Others detained at the airport were released during the protests.

=== Portland, Oregon ===
On Saturday, there were around 150 demonstrators inside the Portland International Airport (PDX). While there was an ordinance against marching at the airport, no tickets had been issued by 4:15 p.m. Portland also had around 400 protesters who gathered at the Terry Schrunk Plaza on Monday. Monday's protest was organized by a group called Unite Oregon. City commissioners, Amanda Fritz and Nick Fish, and staff from Senator Jeff Merkley's office attended. During the Monday protest, a 20-year-old man was arrested for "brandishing a replica gun" while he was driving past the rally in his truck. He was charged with second-degree disorderly conduct.

=== Raleigh–Durham, North Carolina ===
There were around 1,500 protesters at the Raleigh Durham International Airport outside Terminal 2 on Sunday.

=== Seattle ===
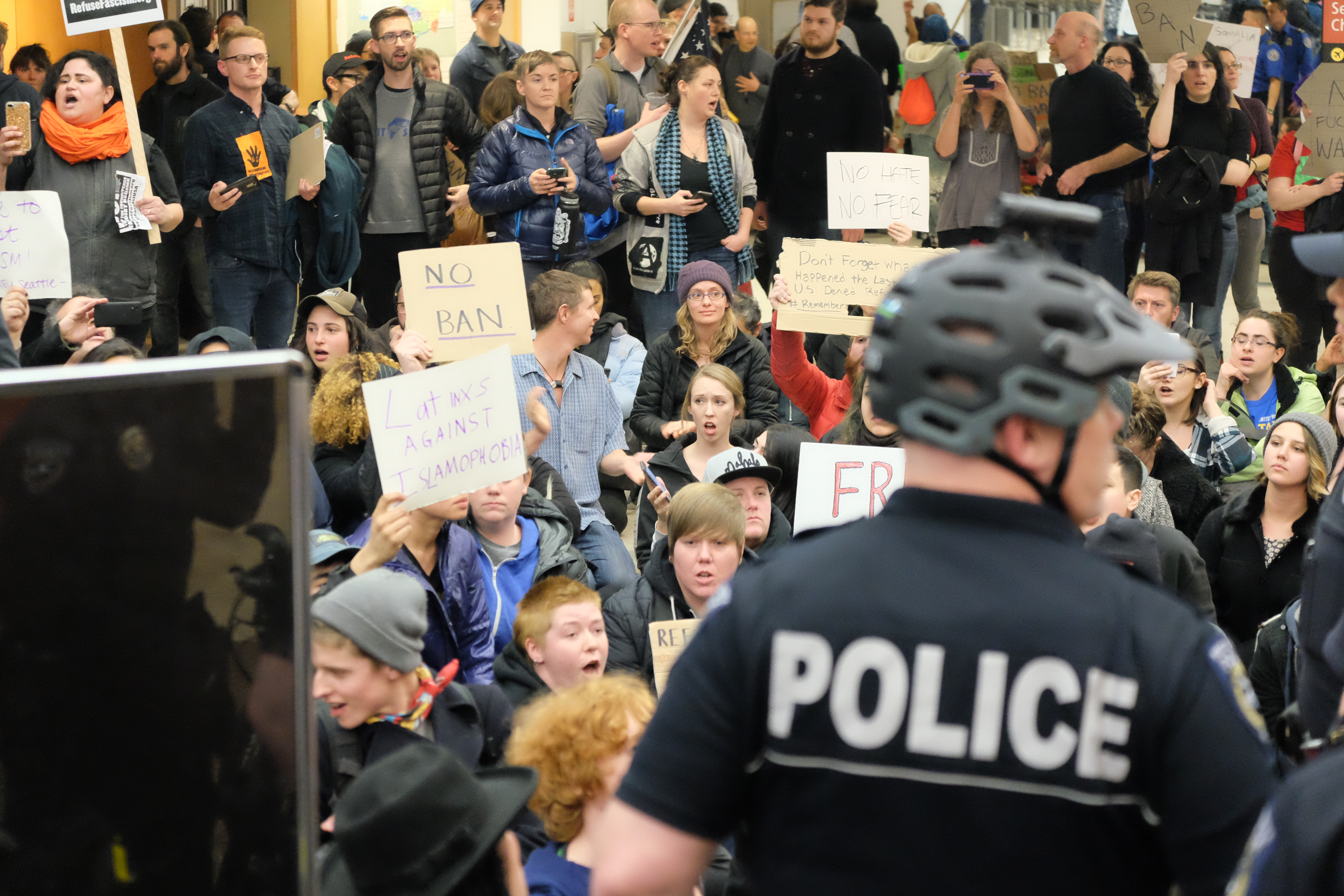
Protesters at Seattle–Tacoma International Airport

The crowd in Seattle on January 28, which grew to more than three thousand, was supported at an on-site news conference by numerous elected officials, including Governor Jay Inslee. "Up to 13 people" were detained in the Seattle airport. In Seattle, the Port police used pepper spray on crowds and around 15 people were arrested.

Link light rail service to the airport's station was halted for 30 minutes during the protest at the request of Port of Seattle Police. It was later restored by Sound Transit, the service's owner, amid criticism that the request limited the freedom of assembly at the airport, a public space. On January 30, Sound Transit and transit operator King County Metro formalized a new protocol requiring future requests from law enforcement to suspend service be approved by the CEO or general manager as a result of the shutdown.

On Monday, January 30, Google workers in Seattle walked out of work in protest against the ban.

=== Texas ===
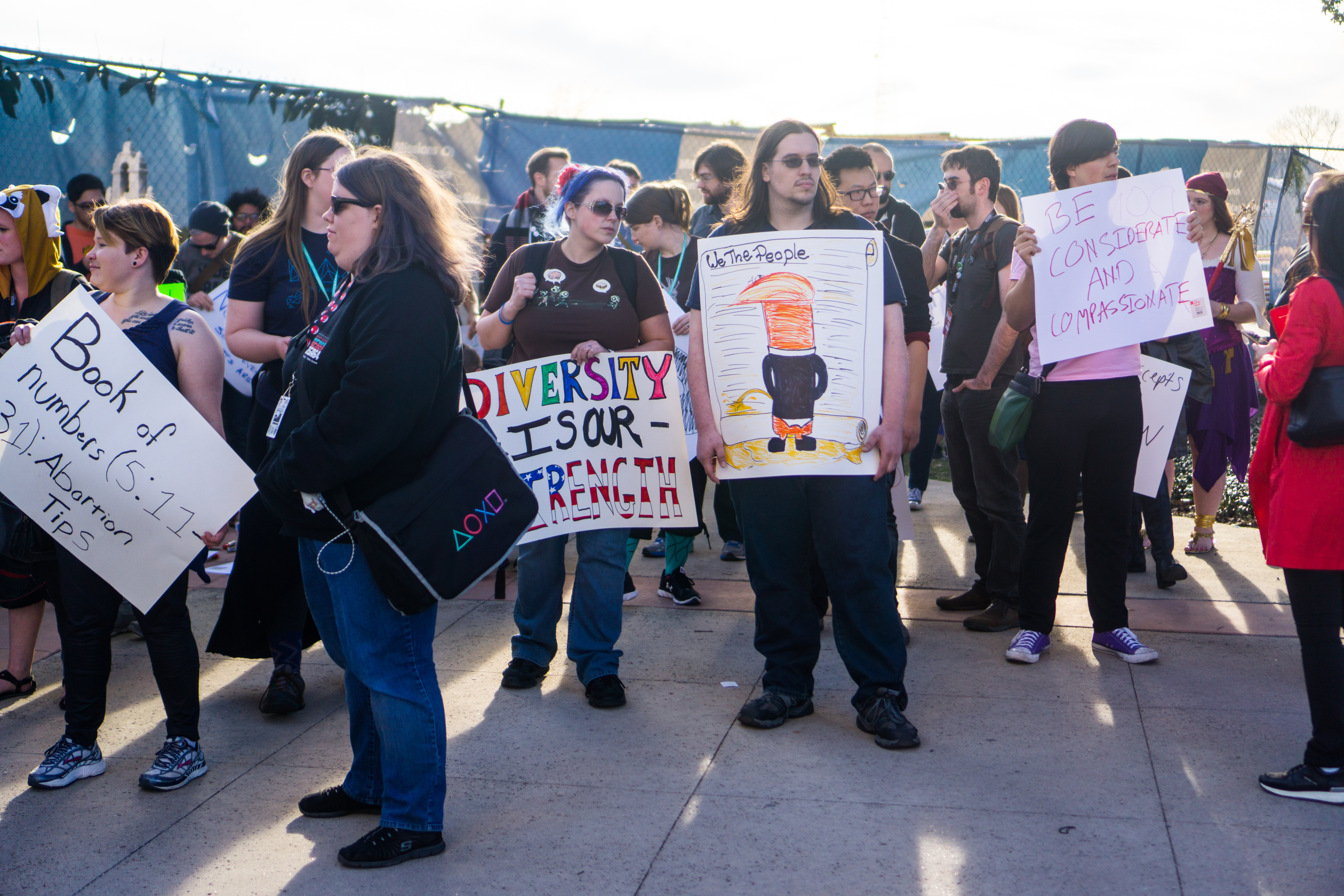
Protesters in San Antonio, Texas

On Sunday afternoon, hundreds of protesters demonstrated at the Austin-Bergstrom International Airport. It was estimated that there were 300 to 400 people there.

There were over 800 protesters at the Dallas-Fort Worth International Airport. The airport had detained 13 travelers, one of whom was an elderly woman and green card holder from Iran who was kept in the airport overnight. Another 800 protesters arrived Sunday to continue to protest Trump's executive order. Nine detainees were released to their families off-site on Sunday, January 29. Dallas mayor Mike Rawlings, who had previously expressed concern over the detention, met with the travellers and expressed apologies on behalf of the people of Dallas.

The city of El Paso hosted a small demonstration of around 30 people on Sunday at the El Paso International Airport in a protest organized by Muslims of El Paso and Friends.

In Houston, protests took place around the city over the course of the weekend. On January 28, demonstrators went to George Bush Intercontinental Airport to protest. On Sunday, protesters filled the George Bush Intercontinental Airport to capacity. More than a thousand people marched near Discovery Green (which at the time hosted Super Bowl Live) to demonstrate against the executive order. Further protests took place during Super Bowl weekend.

=== Washington, D.C. ===
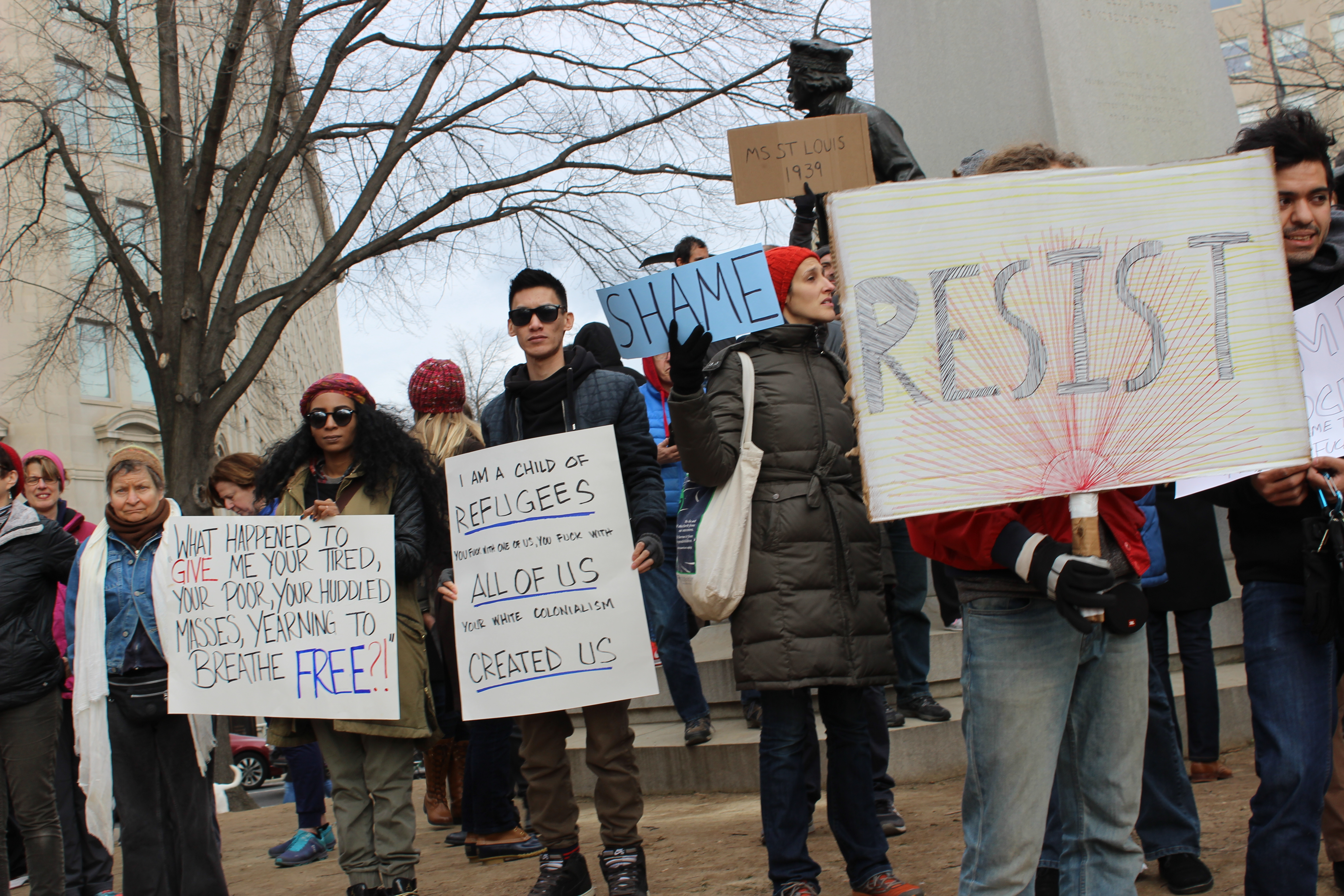
Demonstrators in Washington, D.C.

The Governor of Virginia, Terry McAuliffe, joined the protest at Dulles International Airport on Saturday. Senator Cory Booker was also at the protest at the Dulles International Airport, as well as Democratic representatives John Delaney, Gerry Connolly, and Don Beyer. Rabbi Jack Moline, president of the Interfaith Alliance, also joined the protest. The advocacy group, CASA, helped bring in dozens of protesters.

Protesters continued to demonstrate at Dulles and other protesters demonstrated outside the White House on Sunday. Senators Kamala Harris and Catherine Cortez Masto were at the protests. Other protesters demonstrated outside of the Trump International Hotel.

On Monday evening, Democrats demonstrated outside of the United States Supreme Court Building in opposition to the executive order. House Minority Leader, Nancy Pelosi, Senators Chuck Schumer, Joe Manchin, Cory Booker, Elizabeth Warren, Bernie Sanders, Jeff Merkley and Al Franken along with Representatives Jerrold Nadler, Nydia Velázquez, Andre Carson, and Joseph Crowley spoke at the rally.

More than two thousand people attended the "Rally for Refugees" at Ronald Reagan Washington National Airport on February 1, 2017, including Congressman Hank Johnson.

=== Germany ===
A crowd of around 1,200 protesters against Trump marched on February 4, 2017, through the city of Berlin. The protest rallied in front of the U.S. Embassy and near the Brandenburg Gate. The Los Angeles Times reported that "Trump's actions and tough talk on a number of issues in his first two weeks have deeply unsettled many Germans." The protest was organized by a group called The Coalition and also targeted Trump's planned wall between Mexico and the United States. Following these protests, German Chancellor Angela Merkel also criticized the order and claimed that "the necessary and decisive battle against terrorism does not in any way justify putting groups of certain people under general suspicion, in this case people of Muslim belief or of a certain origin". Merkel also touched on the importance of welcoming those fleeing war, saying the Travel Ban "contradicts the base concept of international aid for refugees." Merkel also touched on the Syrian refugee crisis and mentioned that countries should be welcoming these refugees fleeing war instead of promoting travel bans.

=== United Kingdom ===
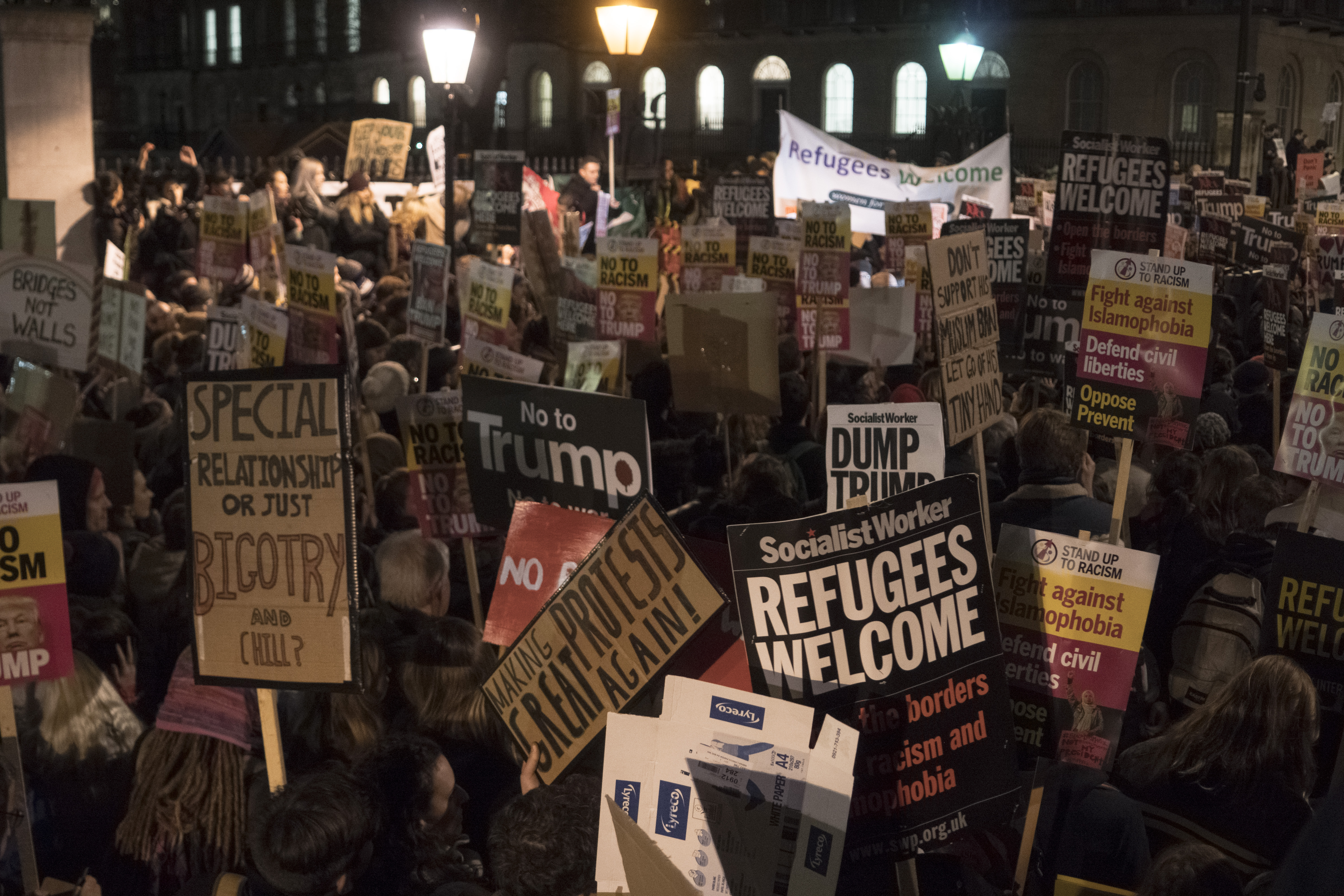
Protests in Whitehall, London, January 30, 2017

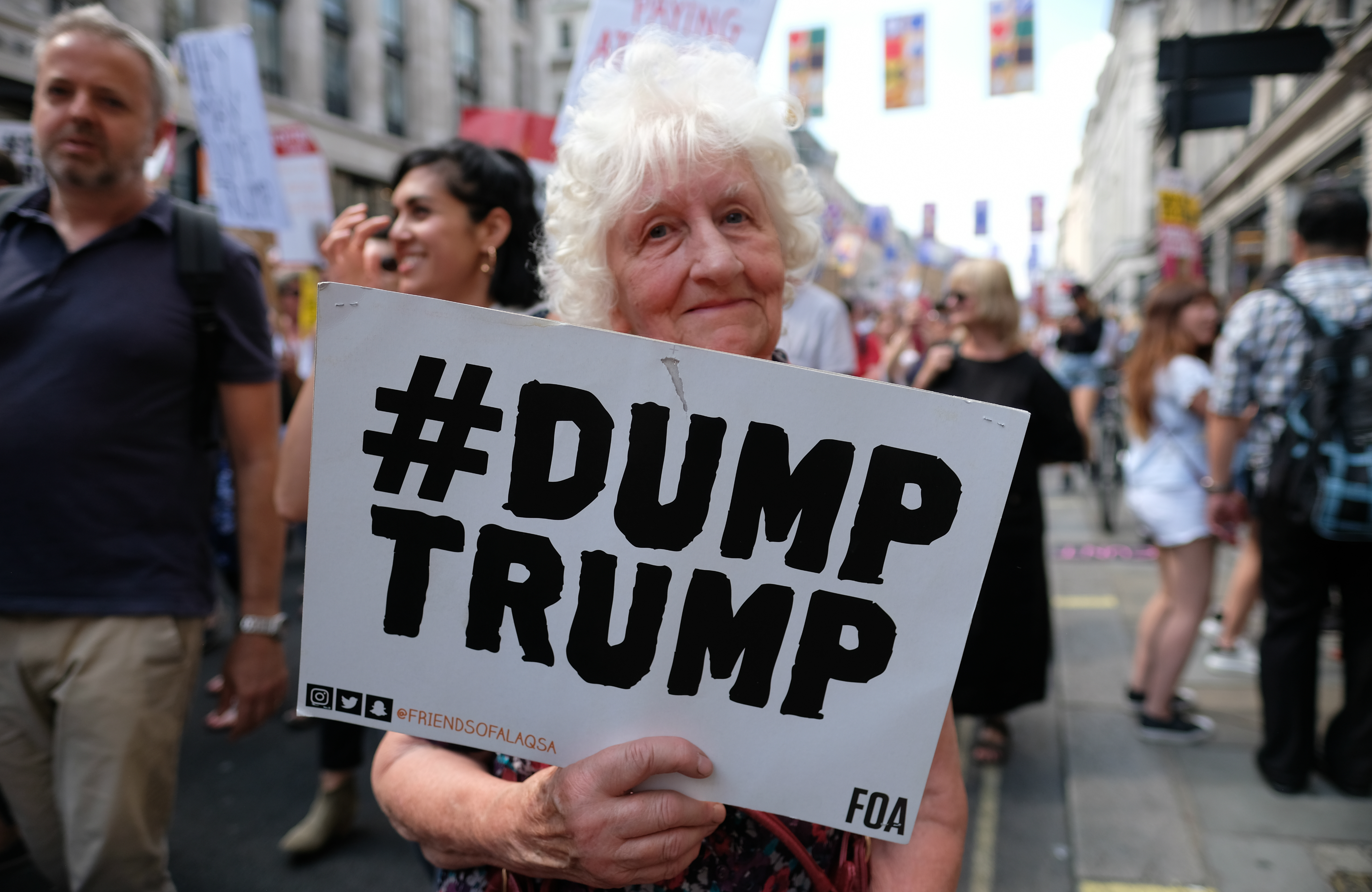
Protester on July 13, 2017, at Trafalgar Square, London. The sign refers to online protests, i.e. hashtags.

A mass protest in London was scheduled for Monday evening, with nine thousand people registering on Facebook and another sixteen thousand stating they were interested in attending. Owen Jones was one of the organizers of the event which protested the executive order. Protesters also asked that a recent invitation to President Trump to visit the UK be rescinded. The march towards Downing Street began around 6 p.m. The march packed Westminster station and brought Whitehall to a "standstill." Thousands of protesters joined the demonstration.

About three thousand people attended the Manchester demonstration. Crowds also attended protests in Glasgow, Edinburgh, Cardiff, Newcastle, Sheffield, Oxford, Cambridge, Brighton, Gloucester, Leeds, York, Liverpool, Leicester, where Yasmin Surti said, "This sends out a powerful message to Mr. Trump that people of all colours and creeds are as one in Leicester."

On February 4, 2017, about ten thousand people protested in London against May's support of Trump.

United Kingdom has been active on protesting against the travel ban also known as the Executive Order 13769. At least 30 rallies have occurred in the UK since the travel ban went into effect and the protests have been .

On July 13, 2018, President Trump visited London and faced protests by thousands at Trafalgar Square in London and Blenheim Palace in Oxfordshire. Protesters carried various banners that criticized President Trump's policies with some saying "Trump Not Welcome", "Together Against Trump", "No to Racism, No to Trump", "Dump Trump" and "World's No. 1 racist". Another demonstration was led by Amnesty International activists where they unfurled a banner on Vauxhall Bridge in Central London that said "Human Rights Nightmare" and had Trump's portrait on it.

== Reactions ==
Former United States President Barack Obama publicly stated that he disagreed with the travel ban and was "heartened by the level of engagement taking place in communities around the country." In response, Larry Klayman sued Obama, alleging his comments incited a protester at the Los Angeles International Airport.

Many other celebrities reacted to the travel ban on social media including Lin-Manuel Miranda, Bette Midler, Stephen Colbert, Morgan Freeman, and Mia Farrow. In June 2018 Donald Trump posted a tweet saying "Supreme Court upholds Trump travel ban. WOW!". Many celebrities responded to this including Morgan Freeman who said "Making America White Again! Huge step back towards much darker days." American artist Lin-Manuel Miranda tweeted, "Shameful day for the Supreme Court". The American Civil Liberties Union (ACLU) also posted a tweet saying, "This is not the first time the court has been wrong, or has allowed official racism and xenophobia to continue rather than standing up to it."

Along with the protests all around the country and the world, reactions on social media have become a major contributor to the protests as celebrities and social media users continued to contribute to the hashtags related to the protests. The celebrities mentioned above all have officially approved Twitter accounts with millions of followers which shows that their tweets and activities become available to an audience and allows the hashtags and topic on the travel ban to appear on the trending section of Twitter and other social media platforms.

=== Social media reactions ===
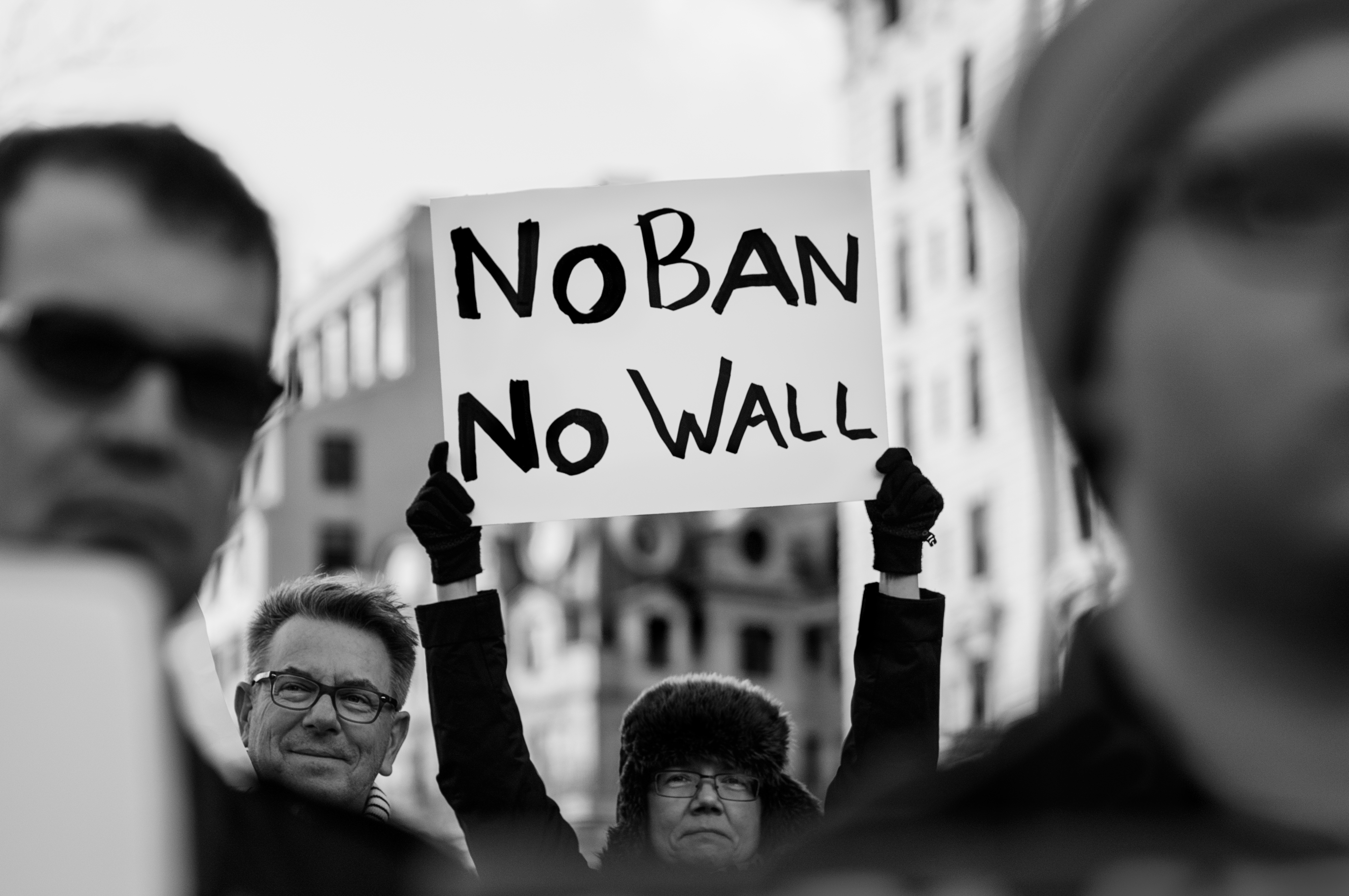
Image from the protests at Washington D.C where the protester is holding a banner that says "No ban no wall" which became a popular hashtag on the internet and social media.

The protests against Executive Order 13769 also spread on social media and the internet. On January 25, 2017, protesters gathered in New York and chanted "No ban no wall". The chant became a symbol of the protests all around the country including protests in Seattle and Washington, D.C. These chants were soon used on Twitter as #nobannowall to protest president Trump's border wall and travel ban policies also known as Executive Orders 13769 and 13767. The hashtag #nobannowwall soon became popular on other social media platforms such as Facebook, Instagram and Tumblr. On Facebook, users created pages to coordinate protests such as "No Ban No Wall SF". The "No Ban No Wall SF" page was used to create a protest event where 22,000 people expressed interest and 10,000 were expected to attend to the event.

Twitter was actively used by Donald Trump as he posted tweets regarding the travel ban. Even before the protests, on March 25, 2016, President Trump tweeted "It is amazing how often I am right, only to be criticized by the media. Illegal immigration, take the oil, build the wall, Muslims, Nato!" In another Tweet on September 15, 2017, Trump said "The travel ban into the United States should be far larger, tougher and more specific - but stupidly, that would not be politically correct!"

Tweets related to the order came not only from Donald Trump; many social media users and some celebrities posted tweets in response to his policy. Mia Farrow tweeted, "Travel ban is born of this president's xenophobia" and said "it also makes clear that we need laws to govern a tyrannical president."

==== Related hashtags ====
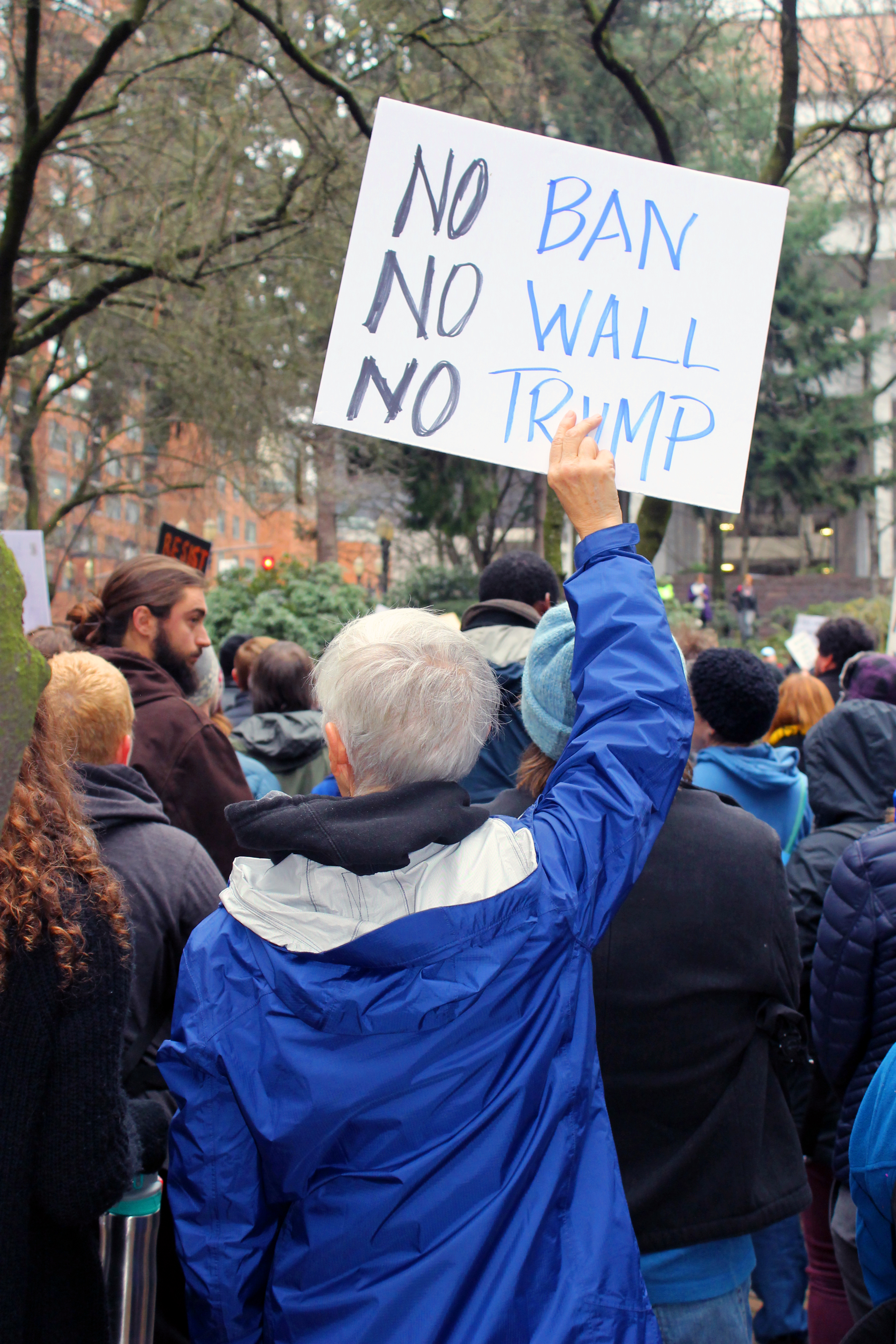
Protests at Portland, Oregon. The banner shows some of the related hashtags on social media used to protest Executive Order 13769. These chants were used on social media as #nobannowall and #noTrump.

The hashtag #nobanowall soon became related to others:

- #noTrump: This hashtag also became very popular on social media platforms and was used by protesters who criticized Trump's policies.
- #GrandparentsNotTerrorists: President Trump's travel ban was planned to suspend the issuance of visas to refugees and citizens of North Korea, Venezuela, Libya, Iran, Somalia, Syria and Yemen. However, it was stated that refugees or citizens of these countries who have a "bona fide relationship" with a person in the US would be exempt from this ban. This meant that grandparents, grandchildren, aunts and uncles were not exempt of the travel ban. The National Iranian American Council started this protest on Twitter and other social media platforms using the hashtag #grandparentsnotterrorist. Social media users used this hashtag to highlight the fact that the order was barring entry to grandparents and others who wished to see their family.
- #MuslimBan: This hashtag was used by people who wanted to add to the discussion of Executive Order 13769. In posts related to this hashtag, there are posts from supporters as well as those who oppose President Trump's policy.

=== Other responses ===
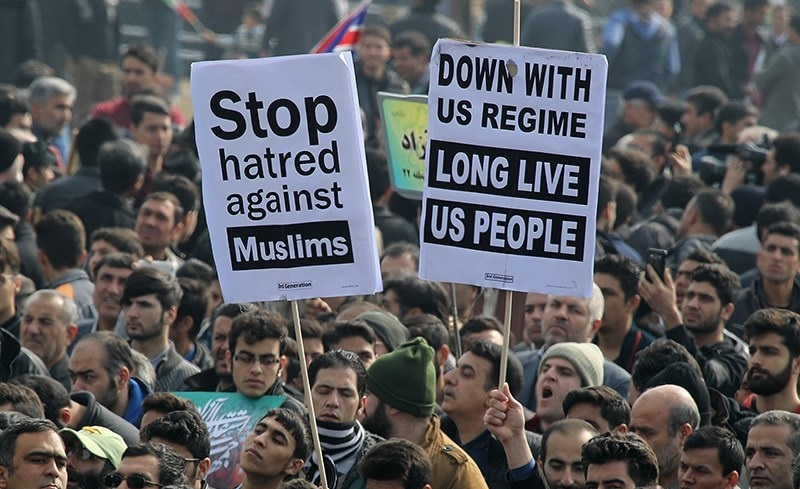
Protest in Tehran, Iran, February 10, 2017

In opposition to the executive order, over 350,000 people donated to the ACLU. The organization collected more money over the weekend of January 28 than it did during all of 2016. Lyft was one of the companies that donated, giving $1 million (~$1.31 million in 2025) to the ACLU. Because Uber was seen as acting as strike-breakers during the New York taxi strike and also because Uber's CEO, Travis Kalanick, had agreed to serve on an economic advisory panel for Trump, many protesters are boycotting Uber and using Lyft or traditional taxi service instead.

Starbucks pledged to hire 10,000 refugees worldwide over the next five years as a response to the executive order.

On January 28, writer Eoin Higgins called for using the momentum of the JFK protests as a prelude to a general strike.

Small businesses and bodegas in New York City owned by Yemeni immigrants closed from noon to 8 p.m. on February 2 in protest against the executive order. It was expected that more than a thousand businesses would be shut down. In the evening, many of the business owners and supporters demonstrated at Brooklyn Borough Hall.

The United Talent Agency (UTA) cancelled its annual Oscars party to protest the travel ban. The amount to be spent on the party, $250,000, was donated to the ACLU instead.

== Impact ==
Muslims in New York City had reported feeling supported by the protests and more a part of the community. In the United Kingdom, Muslims also "appreciated the show of solidarity."
