= Judicial Watch =

American conservative activist group

Coordinates: 38.8836°N 77.0155°W

- Formation: July 29, 1994; 32 years ago
- Type: 501(c)(3) organization
- Tax ID no.: 52-1885088
- Headquarters: 425 Third Street, SW; Washington, D.C., U.S. 20024
- Location: United States
- President: Tom Fitton
- Revenue: $102 million (2025)
- Expenses: $57.4 million (2025)
- Staff: 59 (2023)
- Website: www.judicialwatch.org

Judicial Watch (JW) is an is a 501(c)(3) nonprofit conservative activist group It works on government oversight through Freedom of Information Act (FOIA) requests and lawsuits. It describes its mission as promoting transparency, accountability, and integrity in government.

Judicial Watch has primarily targeted Democrats, in particular the administrations of Bill Clinton and Barack Obama, as well as Hillary Clinton's role in them. It was founded by attorney Larry Klayman, and has been led by Tom Fitton since 2003.

== History ==
Judicial Watch was founded in 1994 by attorney and conservative activist Larry Klayman. Before leaving the organization in 2003, Klayman hired Tom Fitton, who became president of the organization. In October 2016, The New York Times wrote: "Judicial Watch's strategy is simple: Carpet-bomb the federal courts with Freedom of Information Act lawsuits."

As of 2024, the organization had 63 employees. Judicial Watch calls itself a nonpartisan educational foundation as well as a media organization. According to the Times, "the group has forced the release of government records that would otherwise have been kept from the public." Critics accuse JW of "weaponizing the Freedom of Information Act for political purposes."

=== Clinton administration ===
Judicial Watch came to public attention after filing eighteen lawsuits against the administration of Democratic U.S. President Bill Clinton and other figures in the Clinton administration. An early lawsuit was filed by Judicial Watch on behalf of the Western Center for Journalism (WCJ) in 1998. The lawsuit alleged a retaliatory audit by the Internal Revenue Service (IRS). The WCJ was investigating the death of Clinton deputy White House counsel Vince Foster at the time.

The organization received considerable financial support from prominent Clinton critics, including US$7.74 million from conservative billionaire Richard Mellon Scaife. This led Clinton administration officials to accuse Judicial Watch of "abusing the judicial system for partisan ends".

=== Bush administration ===
Judicial Watch was involved in a legal dispute with Vice President Dick Cheney in 2002 when the group filed a shareholder lawsuit against Halliburton. The lawsuit, which accused Halliburton of accounting fraud, alleged that "when Mr. Cheney was chief executive of Halliburton, he and other directors inflated revenue reports, boosting Halliburton's share price." As reported by The Wall Street Journal the court filing claims the oil-field-services concern overstated revenue by a total of $445 million from 1999 through the end of 2001.

In July 2003 Judicial Watch joined the environmental organization Sierra Club in suing the George W. Bush administration for access to minutes of Vice President Dick Cheney's Energy Task Force.

=== Obama administration ===
Judicial Watch filed over twenty FOIA lawsuits involving the Secretary of State Hillary Clinton's emails.

In February 2016, District Court Judge Emmet G. Sullivan granted Judicial Watch's motion for discovery into whether the State Department and former Secretary of State Hillary Clinton deliberately thwarted the FOIA by using a private email server to obscure her communications from public records requests.

In March 2020, federal district court judge Royce Lamberth ruled that Clinton must provide a deposition. A three-judge panel of the DC Circuit Court of Appeals unanimously overturned Lamberth's ruling in August. The full DC Circuit Court unanimously declined to hear an appeal in October, allowing the panel decision to stand. In March 2021, the United States Supreme Court declined to consider an appeal by Judicial Watch.

=== Trump administration ===
In 2020, Judicial Watch obtained copies of emails related to the Steele Dossier through a FOIA lawsuit.

In the months prior to the 2020 election, Judicial Watch filed or threatened lawsuits against several states related to alleged inaccuracy of their voter rolls, demanding that nearly two million names be purged.

In October 2020, the group sued the state of California, claiming a law requiring corporations doing business in the state to have directors from sexual or racial minorities is unconstitutional, asserting "The legislation's requirement that certain corporations appoint a specific number of directors based upon race, ethnicity, sexual preference, and transgender status is immediately suspect and presumptively invalid and triggers strict scrutiny review by the court." In April 2022, a California judge agreed. In December 2022, a California appeals court also agreed.

A 2020 study by researchers from Northeastern, Harvard, Northwestern and Rutgers universities found that Judicial Watch was among the top five most shared fake news domains in tweets related to COVID-19, the others being The Gateway Pundit, InfoWars, WorldNetDaily, and Natural News.

== Activities and controversies ==
Judicial Watch's main targets have been Democrats, particularly Bill and Hillary Clinton and the Obama administration.

=== Commerce Department trade mission scandal ===
In 1995, Judicial Watch, Inc. filed an action in the District Court under the FOIA, seeking information from the Department of Commerce (DOC) regarding DOC's selection of participants for foreign trade missions. In May 1995, following a search in response to Judicial Watch's FOIA requests, DOC produced approximately 28,000 pages of nonexempt information and withheld about 1,000 documents as exempt. Disputes arose between the parties over the adequacy of DOC's search, and Judicial Watch charged that some DOC officials had destroyed or removed responsive documents. In December 1998, following discovery, the District Court granted partial summary judgment to Judicial Watch and ordered DOC to perform a new search. During the investigation, Nolanda B. Hill, a business partner of Commerce Secretary Ron Brown testified that Brown had told her that first lady Hillary Clinton was the driving force behind the efforts to raise as much money as possible for President Clinton's reelection and the DNC. And further that, "...companies were being solicited to donate large sums of money in exchange for their selection to participate on trade missions of the Commerce Department."

=== Vince Foster conspiracy theory ===
Judicial Watch helped promote the conspiracy theory that Vince Foster was murdered by the Clintons, and still has yet to provide convincing proof.

=== White House visitor logs ===
August 10, 2009 Judicial Watch sent a FOIA request to the US Secret Service asking that official White House visitor logs be made public. In August 2011, U.S. District Judge Beryl Howell ordered the agency to process the group's data request. The Court of Appeals for the District of Columbia partially affirmed the decision, holding that the Secret Service did not have to produce records of visitors to the president's office.

=== Pelosi air travel FOIA releases ===
Judicial Watch filed a FOIA request with the U.S. Air Force on January 25, 2009, for records of Speaker Nancy Pelosi's use of military aircraft for official travel. The Air Force provided the requested documentation and Judicial Watch reported the findings and posted the 2000 documents onto their website.

Judicial Watch reported findings from the documents that 85 trips involving Pelosi, family members and staff. Total cost $2,100,744.59 from 2009 to mid-2010. The in-flight and non transport expenses (included food and alcohol) totaled $101,429.14. Judicial Watch called it a scandal.

Factcheck.org reviewed the claims made by Judicial Watch and argued that the claims were overstated and one sided. The FOIA documents remain publicly accessible via the archived Judicial Watch pages.

=== Operation Neptune Spear ===
Osama bin Laden, leader of the terror group al-Qaeda, was killed in Pakistan on May 1, 2011, in a joint operation by the United States Navy SEALs and the Central Intelligence Agency (CIA). This operation was code-named Operation Neptune Spear. On May 2, 2011, Judicial Watch filed a FOIA request with the Department of Defense and the CIA for photographs and videos of bin Laden taken during or after the operation.

The government failed to produce any records within the required twenty days. In order to force compliance, Judicial Watch filed a FOIA lawsuit against the DOD and CIA on June 8, 2011. On January 31, 2014, after legal wrangling, the Pentagon released Operation Neptune Spear documents to Judicial Watch. One email had the subject line OPSEC Guidance / Neptune Spear and showed that, after the date of the original FOIA request, U.S. Special Operations Commander, Admiral William McRaven, ordered his subordinates to immediately destroy any Osama bin Laden photos they may have had.

=== Bill Clinton/Taylor Branch tapes ===
In 2012, Judicial Watch sued the National Archives and Records Administration (NARA) in an attempt to force NARA to declare audio tapes held at the William J. Clinton Presidential Library and Museum of Bill Clinton to be presidential records, seize them, and release them to Judicial Watch. During Clinton's tenure in office, he had allowed historian Taylor Branch to interview him privately for a book Branch was planning to write. It was published in 2009 under the title "The Clinton Tapes". NARA had declined to deem the tapes to be "presidential records", and the federal judge dismissed the lawsuit stating that "the relief that plaintiff seeks – that the Archivist assume 'custody and control' of the audiotapes – is not available under the PRA." This case was called the "Clinton socks case" by former president Trump because the tapes were said to have been stored in Clinton's socks drawer.

=== Kennedy assassination records ===
Judicial Watch filed a FOIA lawsuit against the National Archives and Records Administration (NARA) to obtain the records from Robert F. Kennedy's time as the Attorney General. The records covered sensitive intelligence operations conducted during the John F. Kennedy and Lyndon B. Johnson administrations.

=== Hillary Clinton email lawsuits ===
Judicial Watch has currently filed twenty FOIA lawsuits involving the Secretary of State Hillary Clinton's emails.

On February 8, 2016, the FBI confirmed it was investigating Hillary Clinton's use of a private email server during her time as Secretary of State. The Bureau was forced to formally acknowledge the investigation due to an ongoing FOIA lawsuit brought by Judicial Watch. FBI director James Comey had previously referenced the investigation, although the FBI had declined to confirm or deny it in court filings.

A federal judge ruled on February 23, 2016, that top aides to Hillary Clinton could be questioned under oath by Judicial Watch about her use of a private email server as secretary of state. District Court Judge Emmet G. Sullivan granted Judicial Watch's motion for discovery into whether the State Department and former Secretary of State Hillary Clinton deliberately thwarted the Freedom of Information Act by using a private email server to obscure her communications from public records requests.

In May 2016 U.S. District Court Judge Emmet G. Sullivan granted "discovery" to Judicial Watch into former Secretary of State Hillary Clinton's email system. This ruling allowed Judicial Watch to question two close Clinton aides, Huma Abedin and Cheryl Mills, under oath. In a separate FOIA lawsuit concerning Hillary Clinton and the Benghazi terrorist attack, U.S. District Court Judge Royce Lamberth ruled Judicial Watch can conduct discovery into the email practices of Clinton and her top aides.

In a separate case, on March 29, 2016, U.S. District Court Judge Royce Lamberth granted Judicial Watch limited discovery, citing potential bad faith by the government in responding to requests for documents related to talking points provided to Susan Rice in response to the Benghazi attack.

A FOIA lawsuit by Judicial Watch led to the release of 2,800 e-mails from Clinton aide Huma Abedin that were found on the laptop computer of Anthony Weiner, Abedin's estranged husband. Five of the e-mails were classified.

=== False claims about George Zimmerman protests ===
In 2013, Judicial Watch claimed that the Department of Justice under the Obama administration organized protests against George Zimmerman after the Trayvon Martin shooting; PolitiFact said that this was "mostly false" and that while Justice Department employees were sent to Florida, they "were sent with the idea of keeping the situation peaceful and calm, not to instigate or condone protests or violence."

=== Islamic State in Mexico scares ===
In 2014 and 2015, Judicial Watch falsely claimed that Islamic State (ISIS) had set up camp in Mexico; Judicial Watch's claims were picked up by several right-wing news outlets.

=== Collaboration with Steve Bannon and Breitbart News ===
In 2013, Judicial Watch collaborated with Steve Bannon, executive chairman of the alt-right website Breitbart News, on the film "District of Corruption", which critiqued the Obama administration. Judicial Watch paid Bannon's group Victory Film Project $382,143 for the film. Politico described the film as an "infomercial for the work of Judicial Watch".

Judicial Watch has advertised on Breitbart for a number of years. Judicial Watch's president Tom Fitton said "Liberal activists want to destroy Breitbart, but we won't be cowed".

=== Murder of Seth Rich conspiracy theory ===
In 2017, Judicial Watch requested documents related to the death of DNC staffer Seth Rich; Seth Rich's death led to debunked right-wing conspiracy theories alleging that Hillary Clinton or the Democratic Party had him killed.

=== False voter fraud claims ===
In August 2017, Judicial Watch falsely alleged that 11 California counties had more registered voters than their estimated populations of citizens eligible to vote; the claims were picked up by outlets such as Breitbart News and Russian propaganda network RT (Russia Today). Judicial Watch counted "inactive voters" in its tally, which is a list of people that California maintains of people who have been removed from active rolls after a mail ballot, voter guide or other official document was returned as undeliverable; California keeps such a list as a fail-safe in case eligible voters have been erroneously categorized as "inactive". California Secretary of State Alex Padilla said Judicial Watch's claims were "baseless", and "bad math and dubious methodology". When the Los Angeles Times asked Judicial Watch to share its analysis of voter registration in California, Judicial Watch declined. Judicial Watch's voter fraud claims came in the wake of President Donald Trump's false claims of extensive voter fraud in California during the 2016 presidential election. Trump has subsequently repeatedly promoted Judicial Watch's false claims about voter fraud.

On February 3, 2020, the day of the Iowa caucuses in the Democratic presidential primary, JW president Tom Fitton suggested that voter fraud was afoot in Iowa by falsely claiming that "eight Iowa counties have more voter registrations than citizens old enough to register." The false assertion went viral on social media. Iowa's Secretary of State, Paul Pate, a member of the Republican Party, debunked Fitton's claim by linking to official voter registration data.

Fitton has made alarmist claims about voter fraud, saying "We have all heard about voter fraud and the attempts by liberal media organs like the New York Times and Ivory Tower academics to dismiss it as a nonexistent problem. But is it real, widespread, and substantial to the point that it can decide elections."

=== False claims about Trump Nazi billboard ===
In 2017, Judicial Watch claimed that taxpayer money went into a billboard which depicted President Donald Trump as a Nazi. Further investigation showed that "while the owner of the billboard founded the group that received city funding for the Art Detour event during which the Trump image went up, the billboard project itself did not receive city funding".

=== Lawsuits against climate scientists ===
Judicial Watch has filed lawsuits seeking to force the National Oceanic and Atmospheric Administration (NOAA) to release the correspondence of climate scientists who published a 2015 study in the journal Science. The study had debunked one of the common claims made by those who reject the scientific consensus on climate change, namely that there existed global warming "hiatus" between 1998 and 2012. The Climate Science Legal Defense Fund (CSLDF), American Meteorological Society and Union of Concerned Scientists condemned Judicial Watch, saying that the disclosure of private communications between scientists "would harm (or halt altogether) government scientists' ability to collaborate with colleagues, damage the government's ability to recruit or retain top scientists, and deter critically important research into politically charged fields like climate change". The Judicial Watch lawsuit was inspired by Rep. Lamar Smith, a climate change denier who had accused the authors of the study of "alter[ing] data" to "get the politically correct results they want."

=== Mueller and FBI investigations into Russian interference ===
In 2017, Judicial Watch helped to stoke Republican attacks against Special Counsel Robert Mueller's investigation into Russian interference in the 2016 election. Judicial Watch President Tom Fitton has called for the Special Counsel investigation to be shut down, arguing that prosecutors in the probe were too biased against President Trump to conduct a credible investigation, a claim rejected by Republican Senators Thom Tillis and Bob Corker. Fitton furthermore called for shutting down the Federal Bureau of Investigation (FBI) based on the claim that the Obama administration had turned it into a "KGB-type operation."

=== Accusations against the Clinton Foundation ===
In January 2018, Judicial Watch president Tom Fitton repeated accusations against the Clinton Foundation that it had funneled money intended for charity work in Haiti to pay for Chelsea Clinton's wedding. The Washington Post fact-checked the claim a year earlier and found that it was "lacking any evidence".

=== George Soros smears ===
In October 2018, Chris Farrell of Judicial Watch stirred controversy when he appeared on Lou Dobbs' Fox Business show and used what many described as an anti-Semitic trope to suggest that the State Department was "Soros-occupied" territory. The remark echoed the anti-Semitic trope of a "Zionist-occupied government" to refer to Jewish control of the U.S. government. After widespread condemnation, Fox stated that Farrell would no longer be booked.

Farrell promoted the unsubstantiated conspiracy theory that a migrant caravan traveling through Central America towards the United States was being directed or funded by the "Soros-occupied State Department". Judicial Watch had been engaged in what NPR described as a "full-throated campaign against Soros". Among other things, Judicial Watch raised money by running ads with a call to action: "Expose Soros!"

=== Senator's letters to IRS ===
According to Media Matters for America, in 2015, Judicial Watch claimed that three newly obtained letters sent by Democratic senator Carl Levin to the commissioner of the Internal Revenue Service "discuss how to target conservative groups the senator claimed were 'engaged in political activities'." Media Matters for America reported that Judicial Watch provided a link to the documents on its site, but said it failed to note that one Levin letter did not mention conservatives, while the other two mentioned an equal number of liberal/Democrat and conservative/Republican entities. The Judicial Watch claim was amplified by several conservative media outlets.

=== Statue removal ===
Judicial Watch has sought to remove a statue of Mexican revolutionary Pancho Villa from downtown Tucson. Judicial Watch said the statue "needs to go" because "Pancho Villa did great harm to people."

=== 2020 election voter suppression ===
In 2020, Judicial Watch President Tom Fitton urged attendees of an event organized by the Council for National Policy to prevent mail-in ballots from being sent to voters, saying "We need to stop those ballots from going out, and I want the lawyers here to tell us what to do."

== Larry Klayman lawsuits ==
In 2003, Judicial Watch founder Larry Klayman left the organization to run for the United States Senate from Florida. In 2006, Klayman sued Judicial Watch and its president, Tom Fitton. Judicial Watch asserted several claims against Klayman as well; in 2019, Judicial Watch obtained a $2.8 million verdict against Klayman on its claims of breaches of the severance agreement and trademark infringement.

In 2012, a Judicial Watch employee falsely told Orly Taitz that Klayman had been convicted of not paying child support (Klayman had been indicted, but the charges were later dismissed). Taitz then published the employee's comment on her website. Klayman sued Judicial Watch for defamation, and in 2014, a federal jury awarded Klayman $156,000 in compensatory damages and $25,000 in punitive damages.

In 2017, Freedom Watch (Klayman's successor organization to Judicial Watch) unsuccessfully sued Judicial Watch and the American Conservative Union (ACU), alleging they violated the Sherman Act by colluding to prevent Freedom Watch from participating at the ACU's Conservative Political Action Conference.

Klayman had represented three individuals who sued Judicial Watch, his former employer and client, but he failed to obtain Judicial Watch's consent to waive his conflict of interest. Klayman maintained that the D.C. Bar had "recognized there was no evidence of dishonesty or personal gain". In 2020, however, the D.C. Court of Appeals suspended Klayman's license for 90 days and ordered him to complete a class on legal ethics.

== Peter Paul lawsuit ==
In 2007, former donor Peter F. Paul sued Judicial Watch, accusing it of using his name to raise more than $15 million to support his lawsuit against Bill Clinton and Hillary Clinton while doing little to advance his case. All of Paul's claims were dismissed.

== Funding ==
As of 2016, Judicial Watch had an annual budget of about $35 million. Between 1997 and 2002 Judicial Watch received $7,069,500 in 19 grants from a handful of foundations. The bulk of this funding came from three foundations: the Sarah Scaife Foundation, a funder of politically conservative causes; The Carthage Foundation, which merged into the Sarah Scaife Foundation in 2014; and the John M. Olin Foundation, Inc. As of 2010, the Sarah Scaife Foundation was the group's largest contributor.
