= Larry Klayman =

American former lawyer (born 1951)

- Born: Larry Elliot Klayman; July 20, 1951 (age 75); Philadelphia, Pennsylvania, U.S.
- Education: Duke University (BA); Emory University (JD)
- Political party: Republican

Larry Elliot Klayman (born July 20, 1951) is a disbarred American attorney, right-wing activist, and former U.S. Justice Department prosecutor. He founded both Judicial Watch and Freedom Watch.

In addition to his numerous lawsuits against the Clinton administration, which led him to be called a "Clinton nemesis," Klayman has filed a number of lawsuits against political figures and governmental agencies. Most cases brought by either Judicial Watch or Klayman himself have failed.

Critics have described him as a "gadfly" and "a racist, a frivolous litigator and a conspiracy theorist" while Klayman describes himself as a "modern-day John Adams in a fight for justice." His litigation tactics have led to criticism and to sanctions from legal authorities including a ban from appearing in two courtrooms and suspensions of his law licenses.

== Education and career ==
Larry Klayman was born in Philadelphia. He was born to Jewish parents and identifies himself as a messianic Jew. Despite this, he has also made statements denouncing what he calls the "Marxian Jewish left." He graduated from Harriton High School in 1969 and with honors from Duke University with a B.A. in political science and French literature in 1974. He received his J.D. from Emory University Law School in 1977.

Klayman founded Judicial Watch in 1994. During his tenure, Judicial Watch filed several lawsuits against Bill Clinton and the Clinton administration. Klayman left Judicial Watch to pursue political office. In 2004, Klayman ran for the US Senate from Florida but lost the Republican Party primary, finishing seventh out of eight candidates. After his run for the Senate, Klayman formed Freedom Watch. He says the name originated from an episode of The West Wing in which he was caricatured as "Larry Claypool".

In 2021, Klayman hosted the "Third Continental Congress," at which conservative activists aired their grievances with the federal government. Klayman is the author of three books and wrote periodic columns for conservative websites such as WorldNetDaily.

=== Legal tactics ===
Klayman has a reputation for using aggressive legal tactics; for example, the Southern Poverty Law Center described him as "pathologically litigious." Although he has a poor record of winning cases, his lawsuits have often resulted in the release of previously undisclosed documents that reveal new scandals. He has been blamed for changing the tone of partisan investigations in Washington, DC. In the 1990s, Klayman deposed several White House officials and probed James Carville about his television habits, Paul Begala about his priest, and George Stephanopoulos about his traffic tickets. Carville publicly described Klayman as a "little twerp," and Klayman responded by questioning him about the statement during a deposition.

=== Sanctions and discipline imposed ===
Following Klayman's behavior in a 1992 trial in California federal court, U.S. District Judge William Duffy Keller barred him from his courtroom for life. Five years later, in a separate case in New York, Klayman's behavior led District Judge Denny Chin to issue a lifetime ban on the attorney practicing law before him.

In 2007, Klayman received a $25,000 retainer from a Daytona Beach woman facing criminal charges who accused him of not providing legal services in return. The Florida Bar mediated the matter, and Klayman agreed to pay off a small portion within 90 days, but after the deadline lapsed, he was reprimanded.

In 2014, Klayman agreed to be publicly censured by the District of Columbia Bar. Klayman represented three individuals who had sued Judicial Watch, his former employer and client, but failed to obtain Judicial Watch's consent to waive his conflict of interest. Klayman maintained that the bar had "recognized there was no evidence of dishonesty or personal gain." The D.C. Court of Appeals, which supervises the D.C. Bar, in 2020 instead suspended Klayman's license for 90 days and ordered him to complete a class on legal ethics. Klayman sued Politico for defamation over its coverage of his suspension. In 2021, the D.C. Circuit Court also suspended Klayman's ability to practice before it for 90 days over this matter; it also referred him to one of its committees to determine whether further discipline is warranted.

An October 2016 opinion by a Ninth Circuit Court of Appeals on Klayman's attempt to represent Cliven Bundy noted 12 cases "in which Klayman's ability to practice law in an ethical and orderly manner was called into question."

In 2018, Klayman unsuccessfully sued the D.C. Bar and some of its employees by alleging they were conspiring to disbar him. Klayman's lawsuit acknowledged three disciplinary actions then pending against him: the Judicial Watch matter already mentioned, Klayman's attempts to represent Bundy, and a complaint on his representation of a sexual-harassment plaintiff.

With respect to the last complaint, the D.C. Court of Appeals in 2022 ruled Klayman had committed six ethical violations related to his representation of a client. The D.C. Court of Appeals suspended Klayman's license to practice law for 18 months and imposed a requirement that he prove his fitness to practice law before his license could be reinstated. In light of this suspension, the D.C. Circuit Court in 2023 also imposed reciprocal discipline for 18 months. In 2025, the D.C. Court of Appeals also suspended Klayman's license for his conduct during his attempt to represent Bundy.

On November 6, 2025, as a result of the proceedings with the D.C. Bar, the Florida Bar imposed reciprocal discipline and suspended Klayman's Florida license for two years. In 2026, the Disciplinary Board of the Pennsylvania Supreme Court also imposed reciprocal discipline. On November 9, 2026, he was disbarred from the Supreme Court of the United States.

== Lawsuits ==
=== The Clintons ===
Through Judicial Watch, Klayman filed around 18 lawsuits against the Clinton administration, alleging ethical misconduct and criminal activity. In one case, a federal judge ruled that Clinton violated the Privacy Act when he released personal letters between him and a female White House volunteer. The woman had appeared on national television accusing him of making improper sexual advances, and Clinton claimed that he released the letters to discredit her. The judge determined that was an act of criminal intent, but the ruling was called "inappropriate" by the appellate court.

In the Clinton-era fundraising scandal known as Chinagate, Judicial Watch was awarded nearly $1m in attorney fees against the US Department of Commerce. Klayman represented Gennifer Flowers, who was one of Bill Clinton's mistresses, in a defamation suit against Hillary Clinton. Klayman also represented Dolly Kyle, another woman who claimed to be a mistress of Bill Clinton, in her unsuccessful lawsuit against him.

Klayman represented Jared Paul Stern in his unsuccessful defamation lawsuit against the Clintons, Ronald Burkle, and the Daily News. In 2012, Klayman represented Freedom Watch in its FOIA request to obtain various federal agencies' documents. During the course of litigation, Klayman sought access to Hillary Clinton's private e-mail server, but the courts denied his request. In 2015, Klayman filed an unsuccessful RICO lawsuit against Bill Clinton, Hillary Clinton, and the Clinton Foundation by alleging Hillary Clinton sold access to US government officials in return for donations to the Clinton Foundation.

In the wake of the 2016 shooting of Dallas police officers, Klayman filed unsuccessful lawsuits against Hillary Clinton, Obama, George Soros, former US Attorney General Eric Holder, Nation of Islam leader Louis Farrakhan, Al Sharpton, and some of the founders of the Black Lives Matter movement by alleging they had incited a "race war" that led to the shooting. In 2016, Klayman, on behalf of family members of two people killed in the 2012 Benghazi attack, unsuccessfully sued Hillary Clinton for wrongful death and defamation. In 2017, Klayman circulated a petition to be appointed as a special prosecutor to investigate Hillary Clinton's involvement in the sale of Uranium One.

=== Barack Obama ===
In 2012, Klayman filed on behalf of a Florida resident an unsuccessful challenge to Barack Obama's placement on the primary ballot and claimed the president is not a natural-born citizen, as required by the US Constitution. He also represented the presidential candidate for the Constitution Party and a member of the Alabama Republican Party, who alleged the Alabama Secretary of State had a duty to investigate Obama's eligibility. The trial court dismissed the complaint, and the Alabama Supreme Court affirmed the dismissal. Chief Justice Roy Moore and another justice dissented by arguing the Secretary of State had the authority to conduct such an investigation. Two other justices wrote concurring opinions that supported the dismissal and addressed the dissenting opinions.

In 2013, a citizen grand jury formed by Klayman "indicted" Obama and others of various crimes (including involuntary manslaughter), "convicted" Obama of fraud, and alleged that he had forged his birth certificate to pass presidential eligibility requirements.

On October 13, 2013, during the US government shutdown, Klayman declared at a conservative rally in Washington, DC, "This president is not a president of We the People; he's a president of his people." He urged the crowd to begin a "second American non-violent Revolution" and demanded for Obama to "put the Quran down... [and] figuratively come out with his hands up." Weeks later, Klayman sponsored a "Reclaim America" rally in Lafayette Square, across from the White House, and called for Obama's impeachment. Klayman stated that if Obama did not resign, conservative activists would meet to establish a "shadow government." Klayman had encouraged "millions to occupy Washington D.C." but the reported attendance was between 130 and 200. In 2014, Klayman requested the Department of Homeland Security to initiate deportation proceedings against Obama.

Klayman also sued the National Security Agency in Klayman v. Obama. In 2013, Klayman sued the Obama administration over the collection of phone records by the National Security Agency (NSA). A federal judge agreed with Klayman that the surveillance program was likely unconstitutional but stayed an injunction pending an appeal by the US government. The ACLU and US Senator Rand Paul had filed similar cases, but Klayman's was the only one to gain a favorable court ruling. In 2015, however, the D.C. Circuit vacated the injunction on the basis of Klayman's lack of standing, ruling that Klayman had failed to show that his own records had been collected. Later in 2015, the district court enjoined the NSA from collecting data about Klayman's client, a California lawyer who had recently been added to the lawsuit, but the D.C. Circuit court stayed enforcement of that injunction. In 2017, the district court dismissed the lawsuit and noted, "Klayman accused this Court of being coopted by the so called 'Deep State' into ruling against him. Unfortunately for plaintiffs, such baseless accusations are no substitute for a well-pleaded complaint."

Klayman had several other dismissed suits against Obama, including a lawsuit alleging that the Obama administration had secretly allowed the Ebola virus to enter the US to harm people of the "Caucasian race and Jewish-Christian religion," a suit to block actions taken by the Obama administration regarding gun control, a lawsuit to block the Iran Nuclear Agreement Review Act of 2015, and a suit against Obama and others for inciting airport protests at the Los Angeles International Airport.

Serving as an attorney for Jerome Corsi, Klayman falsely asserted during a March 2019 CNN interview that Obama's birth certificate "uses the word 'African-American' in 1961."

=== Joe and Hunter Biden ===
In 2019, Klayman unsuccessfully sued Joe Biden, Hunter Biden, the Biden 2020 campaign, and Biden 2020 deputy campaign manager Kate Bedingfield, having alleged that they pressured YouTube to ban his channel, which was suspended for two days.

Also in 2019, Klayman vowed to convene a citizen grand jury to "indict" Obama's vice president Joe Biden and his son Hunter Biden for their involvement with Burisma Holdings. In 2023, Klayman's citizen grand jury "convicted" then-President Biden, his son Hunter, and President Biden's brother James Biden.

=== Other legal actions filed by Klayman ===
Klayman has brought a number of lawsuits on behalf of conservative causes or against individuals associated with the Democratic Party. Many of the cases have been dismissed, including lawsuits against Facebook seeking $1 billion for not responding quickly enough to calls to take down an anti-Israel "Third Intifada" page and against the Republican National Committee alleging that it conspired to deprive Donald Trump from being awarded the delegates that he had won in the 2016 Republican Party primary for Florida. In November 2018, Klayman sued Brenda Snipes, the supervisor of elections for Broward County, Florida, over the 2018 election results. In September 2020, Klayman sued Michael Bloomberg and others over Bloomberg's efforts to restore the voting rights of Florida felons who had lost the right to vote. In January 2021, Klayman filed suit against Google, Apple, and Amazon's Web Services because they had prevented Parler from using their services. In 2022, Klayman sued the PGA Tour, claiming its suspension of players who participate in LIV Golf's tournaments violates antitrust laws. In 2026, Klayman sued commentator Hasan Piker, alleging he encouraged violence against Jewish people in the United States.

Klayman filed an unsuccessful suit to remove special counsel Robert Mueller from the Justice Department's investigation into Russian interference in the 2016 United States elections and convened a citizen grand jury that "indicted" Mueller. Klayman has also filed a complaint to the Federal Communications Commission complaint that stating that CNN had incited the "assassination of the elected President and Vice President, and the Speaker of the House."

Klayman has also brought a number of legal actions about his personal life. In 1998, Klayman sued his mother for $50,000 for the reimbursement for medical care provided to his maternal grandmother. In 2013, Klayman defended his actions in an interview with ABC News and said that it was "essentially a case against my stepfather" and that he named his mother "because legally she was next of kin." Klayman also unsuccessfully sued the City Pages and Phoenix New Times newspapers for defamation after they reported on a custody dispute between Klayman and his ex-wife. In 2021, Klayman sued Roger Stone for defamation over Stone's comments on social media about Klayman's divorce proceedings.

Klayman has also sued the group that he founded, Judicial Watch, in 2012. Klayman argued that a Judicial Watch employee falsely told Orly Taitz that Klayman had been convicted of not paying child support. In reality, Klayman had been indicted of failing to pay child support, but the charges were later dismissed. Taitz published the Judicial Watch employee's comment on her website. Klayman sued Judicial Watch for defamation, and in 2014, a federal jury awarded Klayman $156,000 in compensatory damages and $25,000 in punitive damages. In 2019, however, Judicial Watch obtained a $2.3 million verdict against Klayman in a trademark dispute.

=== Lawsuits representing others ===
==== 2000s ====
Klayman represented José Basulto of the Cuban exile organization Brothers to the Rescue, and won a $1.7 million judgment against Fidel Castro in 2005. The Cuban government had shot down two planes, killing all four passengers aboard, all of whom were colleagues of Basulto. A third plane, flown by Basulto, survived the incident. All the planes were determined to have been in international waters.

==== 2010s ====
Klayman represented volunteer 9/11 firefighter Vincent Forras in a lawsuit against Feisal Abdul Rauf to prevent the building of the so-called Ground Zero mosque. In the motion to dismiss, Rauf's attorney called Klayman an "infamous publicity hound" and wrote that Forras "trades in his well deserved laurels for fifteen minutes of fame as a nationally recognized bigot." Klayman and Forras sought sanctions, but the court denied that request and dismissed the suit.

Klayman filed an unsuccessful lawsuit on behalf of then-Phoenix Sheriff Joe Arpaio that alleged that the Obama administration's actions on federal immigration policy had not been authorized by Congress. Klayman represented five former government employees in an unsuccessful lawsuit against the NSA, the Department of Justice, and employees of those agencies for alleged retaliation regarding their complaints about the Trailblazer Project.

Klayman represented Dennis L. Montgomery in his unsuccessful request to intervene in the contempt proceedings against Arpaio in a lawsuit that initially alleged Maricopa County to have engaged in impermissible racial profiling but later revealed that Arpaio had allegedly hired Montgomery to investigate the DOJ. In 2017, Montgomery and Klayman jointly sued James Comey and other federal government officials by alleging a coverup of evidence that Montgomery claimed to show the existence of widespread illegal surveillance by the federal government. The suit was unsuccessful.

Klayman unsuccessfully applied in the United States District Court for the District of Nevada for permission to represent Cliven Bundy in the criminal case stemming from the 2014 Bundy standoff. Klayman did not formally represent Bundy at his criminal trial but conferred with Bundy and his family members. The judge dismissed the case against Bundy, but the government appealed the dismissal, and Klayman represented Bundy on his successful appeal. Following the dismissal of the federal criminal charges against Bundy, Klayman represented Bundy as he unsuccessfully sued in state court for a declaration that the federal government cannot own land in Nevada. Klayman also filed an unsuccessful lawsuit against the federal government on behalf of two of Bundy's codefendants who had been found not guilty. Klayman filed a similar but unsuccessful lawsuit on behalf of Bundy's son, Ryan. Another Bundy co-defendant, Peter Santilli, filed a complaint in January 2019 with the D.C. Bar that alleged that Klayman's efforts during the Bundy case had been lacking. In turn, Klayman unsuccessfully sued Santilli for defamation.

Klayman filed an unsuccessful suit on behalf of Kiara Robles, who alleged her First Amendment rights were violated when she was attacked during the 2017 Berkeley protests. The court revoked Klayman's pro hac vice status for professional misconduct, which ended Klayman's ability to represent her in that court; the courts ultimately dismissed most of her suit.

Klayman, on behalf of former Texas DPS Officer Danny Shaw Jr., filed an unsuccessful lawsuit alleging that the Government of Mexico attempted to "murder" Shaw pursuant to an "anti-American policy" and animosity towards then presidential candidate Donald J. Trump.

Klayman, on behalf of Freedom Watch and later also Laura Loomer, filed an unsuccessful lawsuit against Google, Facebook, Twitter, and Apple, alleging that the companies conspired to censor conservative content. In 2019, Klayman assisted Loomer with an unsuccessful lawsuit against U.S. Representative Rashida Tlaib which alleged that Tlaib had "violently grabbed" Loomer's cellphone.

Klayman filed a request for an investigation into the Special Counsel's tactics on behalf of Jerome Corsi, who was a subject of the investigation of 2016 presidential election; Klayman also represented Corsi in an unsuccessful lawsuit alleging Mueller and other government actors violated his constitutional rights and leaked grand jury secrets. In addition, Klayman represented Corsi's stepson while he testified before a federal grand jury about his stepfather. Schaeffer Cox retained Klayman to help with a FOIA request for law enforcement records in his criminal case.

==== 2020s ====
Klayman filed a suit on behalf of himself, Freedom Watch, and a Dallas-area photography studio which alleged that the Chinese government created the coronavirus disease as a biological weapon. Klayman also represented Ben Stein in a lawsuit that alleged that California's shelter-in-place order in response to the pandemic was illegal. Klayman further requested that the International Criminal Court open an inquiry to investigate the virus's origins. In addition, Klayman filed an unsuccessful defamation lawsuit against CNN over its coverage of these lawsuits.

Klayman filed a lawsuit on behalf of Joel Gilbert's production company that alleged breach of contract after a movie theater canceled Gilbert's private screening of his film, The Trayvon Hoax. Klayman filed a lawsuit on behalf of seven former Philadelphia police officers which alleged that they were wrongfully fired following discovery of their racist comments. Klayman filed an unsuccessful lawsuit on behalf of Siaka Massaquoi that alleged that the FBI illegally searched Massaquoi's house following the 2021 United States Capitol attack. Klayman filed a lawsuit on behalf of ROKiT over a sponsorship dispute with Williams Racing. Klayman filed on behalf of a self-published author a lawsuit that alleged Netflix and others stole his idea for the 2021 film Don't Look Up.

==== Defamation lawsuits ====
In addition to defamation lawsuits filed on his own behalf or against the Clintons, Klayman also has litigated defamation lawsuits on behalf of Forras, Joseph Farah, Bradlee Dean, Arpaio, Montgomery, Loomer, Corsi, Roy Moore, Laurie Luhn, Jackie Beard Robinson, George Zimmerman, Demetrick Pennie, and Patrick Reed. None of Klayman's efforts have yet been successful.
