= Endgame =

Endgame, Endgames, End Game, End Games, or similar variations may refer to:

== Film ==
- The End of the Game (1919 film)
- The End of the Game (1975 film), short documentary U.S. film
- Endgame (1983 film), an Italian post-apocalyptic film
- End Game, a 1987 Indian short animated film about nuclear holocaust, winner of the National Film Award for Best Non-Feature Animation Film
- Endgame (1999 film), a short film about chess
- End Game (2006 film), a political thriller
- Endgame (2007 film), an Alex Jones film, subtitled "Blueprint for Global Enslavement"
- Endgame (2009 film), a British film about the end of apartheid in South Africa
- Endgame (2015 film), an American film starring Rico Rodriguez
- End Game (2018 film), an Oscar-nominated documentary short film about terminally ill patients in San Francisco
- Endgame (2021 film), a Chinese-Hong Kong action black comedy
- Avengers: Endgame, the fourth film in the Avengers series, released in 2019
- Dead Rising: Endgame, a 2016 horror film
- Highlander: Endgame, the fourth film in the Highlander series, released in 2000

== Television ==
- End game, a synonym for "bonus round" in a television game show
- Endgame (TV series), 2011 Showcase television series
- "Endgame", a second-season episode of Alias
- "Endgame", the series finale of Alienators: Evolution Continues
- "Endgame" (Babylon 5), a fourth season episode
- "Endgame", the three-part series finale of Beast Machines
- "Endgame" (The Cape), a 2011 episode
- "End Game", an episode of Dinosaur Revolution
- "Endgame", the two-part series finale of Generator Rex
- "End Game" (Homicide: Life on the Street), a third season episode
- "Endgame" (Kyle XY), the first season finale
- "Endgame" (Law & Order: Criminal Intent), the sixth season finale
- "The Endgame Syndrome", the two-part series finale of Men in Black: The Series
- "End Game" (Merseybeat), a 2002 episode
- "Endgame", a seventh season episode of NCIS
- "Endgame", the fourth season premiere of NCIS: Los Angeles
- "Endgame" (Person of Interest), a third-season episode
- "Endgame", a second season episode of The Savage Dragon
- "Endgame" (Star Trek: Voyager), the two-hour series finale
- "Endgame" (Stargate SG-1), an eighth season episode
- "Endgame" (The Unit), a fourth season episode
- "End Game" (The X-Files), a second season episode
- "Endgame", the two-part "finale" of Transformers: Animated
- "Endgame", the second season finale of Young Justice
- "End Game", the season finale and seventh episode of The Queen's Gambit
- "Endgame", the two-part finale of Generator Rex
- "Endgame" (The Legend of Korra), the season one finale of The Legend of Korra
- "Endgame", a fourth season episode of Xena: Warrior Princess
- "Endgame", the season finale episode of the third season of Scream
- The Endgame, 2022 NBC television series

== Games ==
- Chess endgame, the stage of a chess game when there are few pieces left on the board
- Endgame (video game), 2002
- Endgame: Syria, a 2012 video game
- End Game: Union Multiplayer, a 2022 video game
- Endgame: Proving Ground, an unreleased video game
- Endgame (video gaming), extended gameplay for which players return after completing the core game objectives
- End Game, an expansion pack for the video game Battlefield 3
- End Game, the publisher of ZombsRoyale.io
- Endgame (Star Wars: The Roleplaying Game), a 1996 adventure for Star Wars: The Roleplaying Game
- Endplay, the stage of the play of the cards when there are few cards left in each hand

== Literature ==
=== Science fiction and fantasy ===
- The End of the Game (1986 collection) anthology by Sheri S. Tepper in the series The True Game
- Endgame (anthology), an anthology of short fiction in the Merovingen Nights science fiction series
- Endgame (Doctor Who), a Doctor Who novel
- Clone Wars Volume 9: Endgame, the ninth in a series of trade paperbacks entitled Clone Wars
- Endgame, the second part of the 2013 novelization of the first book of the animated TV series The Legend of Korra
- Endgame: The Calling, a novel by James Frey
- "End-Game", a short story by British sci-fi author J.G Ballard in the collection The Terminal Beach
- Endgames, the 12th book in the series The Imager Portfolio, by L. E. Modesitt Jr.

=== Other uses in literature ===
- The Endgame: The Inside Story of the Struggle for Iraq, from George W. Bush to Barack Obama, by Michael R. Gordon and Bernard E. Trainor
- Endgame (play), 1957, by Samuel Beckett
- Endgame (Jensen books), a two-volume work written by Derrick Jensen
- Endgame: The Blueprint for Victory in the War on Terror, a non-fiction book by Thomas McInerney and Paul E. Vallely
- Endgame: The Spectacular Rise and Fall of Bobby Fischer, a non-fiction book by Frank Brady on chess champion Bobby Fischer
- End Games, a 2007 crime novel by Michael Dibdin
- Batman: Endgame, a DC Comics comic book story arc featuring the Joker
- "Endgame?", a 2000 Marvel Comics comic book story arc following X-Men: Gambit
- End Game: Tipping Point for Planet Earth, a 2015 non-fiction book by Anthony Barnosky and Elizabeth Hadly
- Endgame, the sixth and final Noughts & Crosses book by Malorie Blackman
- Endgame (Scobie book), a 2023 book about the British royal family by Omid Scobie

== Music ==
=== Albums ===
- The End of the Game, 1970, by British blues rock musician Peter Green
- Endgame (Megadeth album), 2009, by Megadeth; also the album's title track
- Endgame (Rise Against album), 2011, by Rise Against; also the album's title track
  - Endgame Tour, a concert tour by Rise Against in support of the above album
- Endgame (Blood of the Martyrs EP), a 2016 extended play by Blood of the Martyrs

=== Songs ===
- "End Game" (song), a track on the 2017 Taylor Swift album Reputation
- "Endgame", a track on the 1991 R.E.M. album Out of Time
- "Endgames", a track on the 1999 Godflesh album Us and Them
- "End Game", a track on the 1983 Ian Anderson album Walk into Light
- "End Game", a track on the 1969 Lalo Schifrin album Mannix
- "Endgame", a track on the 2019 Angel Olsen album All Mirrors

=== Other uses in music ===
- Endgames (band), new wave/funk group from Scotland
- Endgame (opera), 2018, based on Beckett's play, by György Kurtág

== Other uses ==
- Climate endgame, a hypothesis of global societal collapse due to effects of climate change
- End Game, a term in BitTorrent vocabulary concerning its method for obtaining the final few pieces of a file
- Endgame, Inc., a company that provides computer vulnerability research
- Operation Endgame, a plan by the U.S. Department of Homeland Security
