= Once More with Feeling =

Once More with Feeling may refer to:

== Film and television ==
- "Once More, with Feeling" (Buffy the Vampire Slayer), a musical episode of the American TV series Buffy the Vampire Slayer
- Once More, with Feeling!, a 1960 film starring Yul Brynner
- Once More with Feeling (film), a 2009 film written and directed by Jeff Lipsky
- One More Time with Feeling, a 2016 documentary about Nick Cave directed by Andrew Dominik
- "Once More, with Feeling" (Doc), a 2025 episode of Doc

== Music ==
=== Albums ===
- Once More with Feeling: Singles 1996–2004, an album by Placebo and compilation DVD
- Once More with Feeling (EP), an EP released in 2000 by Joe Chapman
- Once More with Feeling (Billy Eckstine album), a 1960 album by Billy Eckstine
- Once More, with Feeling (Blood of the Martyrs album), the 2011 debut album by American Christian metal band Blood of the Martyrs
- Once More, with Feeling (Buffy soundtrack), the soundtrack album of the Buffy the Vampire Slayer episode of the same name

=== Songs ===
- "Once More with Feeling" (song), a 1970 Jerry Lee Lewis single co-written by Kris Kristofferson and Shel Silverstein
- "Once More with Feeling", a song from Willie Nelson's 1970 album, Both Sides Now
- "Once More (With Feeling)", a 1988 song by Crumbächer from the album Tame the Volcano
- "Once More With Feeling", a song on The Cooper Temple Clause album Make This Your Own
- "Once More with Feeling", a song from Get Cape. Wear Cape. Fly's 2006 album The Chronicles of a Bohemian Teenager

== Other uses ==
- Once More, with Feeling (book), a book by Victoria Coren and Charlie Skelton about making a porn movie
- Once More with Feeling, 2017 novel by Méira Cook
