= Iran Policy Committee =

US pressure group

The Iran Policy Committee (IPC), formed in February 2005, is a pressure group meant to influence US government policy towards Iran. IPC is made up of former White House, State Department, The Pentagon and CIA officials as well as scholars from think tanks and academia.

== Aims ==
According to its website, the Iran Policy Committee sees the current debate on American policy towards Iran as focused on two strategies: diplomatic engagement with the Iranian government or military strikes. The IPC says that while it believes that both of these options should be considered, it favors the third proposal, namely, working with Iranian opposition groups "to facilitate democratic change." Its support of opposition groups includes support of the People's Mujahedin of Iran (MEK)

== Co-chairs, directors, and personnel ==
The most important members of the committee apart from the President, Prof. Raymond Tanter, include the following:

- James E. Akins
- Paul Leventhal
- Neil Livingstone
- R. Bruce McColm
- Thomas McInerney
- Charles T. Nash
- Edward Rowny
- Paul E. Vallely
- Clare Lopez - served as Executive Director from 2005–2006
