= Endgame (Blood of the Martyrs EP) =

EP by Blood of the Martyrs
- Released: February 26, 2016
- Recorded: 2014–2015
- Studio: Planet Red Studios, Richmond, Virginia
- Genre: Metalcore
- Length: 27:22
- Label: Independent
- Producer: Andreas Magnusson

Blood of the Martyrs chronology
Completionist (2013)	Endgame (2016)	Here at the End of All Things (2024)

Singles from Endgame
- 1. "The Devil's Grip" Released: January 22, 2016; 2. "Dr. Killinger" Released: February 14, 2016

Endgame is the first commercially released EP by American metalcore band Blood of the Martyrs and is the group's only release with lead vocalist Jason Wilkins. The EP was produced by Andreas Magnusson, who has worked with bands such as Haste the Day, Oh, Sleeper, and Impending Doom.

== Background and sound ==
After completing touring for their second studio album Completionist, Blood of the Martyrs announced in early 2014 that they had started writing new music. Shortly after the announcement lead vocalist/keyboardist Lee Zook announced that he would be leaving the band. Blood of the Martyrs hired Eric Hendricks as a touring vocalist, releasing a re-recorded version of "Lady Nightshade" from their debut album with Hendricks. In 2015 the band announced they had hired Jason Wilkins as their new vocalist and would resume work on the record. On January 22, 2016, the band premiered a video for the single "The Devil's Grip" via Revolver's website. The EP's second single, "Dr. Killinger", was released on February 14.

The sound of the EP resembles more of a metalcore sound, as opposed to the band's previous deathcore/symphonic metal sound heard on previous releases. The album also features clean vocals, something only previously heard on the band's cover songs and the demo version of "Semper Fidelis Tyrannosauruses." Every song title is a reference to Adult Swim's The Venture Bros..

== Track listing ==
All lyrics are written by Jason Wilkins and Bobby Huotari; all music is composed by Blood of the Martyrs.

No.	Title	Length
1.	"The Devil's Grip"	3:29
2.	"Home Insecurity"	3:42
3.	"The Better Man"	4:20
4.	"Dr. Killinger"	4:05
5.	"Return to Malice"	3:18
6.	"The Revenge Society"	4:03
7.	"Council of Thirteen"	4:25
Total length:		27:22

== Personnel ==
- Jason Wilkins – lead vocals
- David Sanders – guitar
- Bobby Huotari – bass, backing vocals
- Michael "Pak Man" Pak – drums
