= Completionist =

Studio album by Blood of the Martyrs
- Released: October 4, 2013
- Recorded: August 2012 to June 2013
- Studios: The Basement Studios, Winston-Salem, North Carolina
- Genres: Deathcore; metalcore
- Length: 35:01
- Label: Independent
- Producer: Jamie King

Blood of the Martyrs chronology
Once More, with Feeling (2011)	Completionist (2013)	Endgame (2016)

Singles from Completionist
- 1. "Colonel Gentleman" Released: August 17, 2012; 2. "The Action Man" Released: June 14, 2013; 3. "Swifty" Released: October 4, 2013; 4. "H.E.L.P.eR." Released: October 30, 2013

Completionist is the second and final studio album by American metalcore band Blood of the Martyrs. This is the first album to feature David Sanders on guitar and Michael Pak on drums and Bobby Huotari on bass and the last to feature vocalist/keyboardist Lee Zook until 2024's Here at the End of All Things.

== About ==
The album's title stems from the word completionist. All of the song titles are references to the TV show The Venture Bros.

== Background and recording ==
The album was produced by Jamie King, who has produced for notable acts such as Between the Buried and Me and For Today.

After numerous DIY tours in support of their debut album the band parted ways with members Brian Paulette, Chris Oberholtzer and Tyler Ferrell. David Sanders and Michael Pak joined the band to fill these positions leaving the band with numerous temporary touring guitarist, including (now current guitarist) Jay Hathaway. On August 17, 2012, the band announced that they were working on an EP and released the music video for "Colonel Gentleman". For the next few months, little was heard about the album due to the bands extensive touring schedule. On June 14, 2013, a lyric video was released for the single "The Action Man", which featured Karl Schubach of Misery Signals. With the song's release, the band had announced that the EP was going to be a full-length as they had surpassed their Kickstarter goal of $2000 by nearly a grand. To tie fans over until the album's release, a cover of The Offspring's "Gone Away" was released on August 9 via YouTube and free download.

== Release ==
Completionist was released independently on October 4, 2013. The band urged fans to purchase the album off of iTunes.

"Colonel Gentleman" was re-recorded for the album, and now featured guest vocals by Micah Kinard. The song "Semper Fidelis Tyrannosaurus" which debuted as a single in 2009 originally and was released on the band's demo in 2010 was re-recorded/written for this release as well.

The band embarked on a month-long tour, known as Gears of Tour, with My Heart to Fear and Alive in the Dark to promote the album.

=== "Lost & Found" ===
The music videos for "Swifty" and "H.E.L.P.eR." form a short film called "Lost & Found". "Swifty" was the first video released and features a man wandering around various places after a zombie outbreak. The video features cuts of the band performing the song, along with the story. "H.E.L.P.eR." serves as the prequel to "Swifty". The video shows the same man from the previous video with his girlfriend. The two are scavenging through places, before they are saved by the band members and taken to a camp. At the song's climax, various zombies attack the camp causing the man and his girlfriend to be separated and thus setting up for "Swifty".

== Reception ==
Professional ratings
Review scores
Source	Rating
HM Magazine	3.5/5 stars
Indie Vision Music	4/5 stars

Upon its release, Completionist has received mainly positive reviews.

HM Magazine reviewer Chelc Eaves praised the intro as it "opens like a haunting score to horror flick" as well as the band's ability to "deliver a solid, faith-based messaging" as it "doesn't seem to choke others out on faith". Eaves stated the album delivers "the good news in an oxymoronic kind of way - light-hearted and brutal all at once". He criticized the electronic elements as they "frequently border on amateur", but also said it gave the album "some twang" from other metalcore bands.

Indie Vision Music reviewer Brody B. praised the band's DIY ethic and listed "Otto Aquarius", "The Action Man", "Colonel Gentleman" and "Swifty" as the album's top tracks. He also criticized the over use of electronics, saying it "felt a bit forced, rather than natural".

== Track listing ==
All lyrics are written by Bobby Huotari; all music is composed by Blood of the Martyrs.

No.	Title	Length
1.	"Return to Spider Skull Island (Intro)" (Instrumental)	1:27
2.	"Kano"	3:46
3.	"Otto Aquarius"	4:28
4.	"The Action Man" (feat. Karl Schubach of Misery Signals)	3:46
5.	"Humongoloid"	3:51
6.	"H.E.L.P.eR." (Instrumental)	4:43
7.	"Colonel Gentleman" (feat. Micah Kinard of Oh, Sleeper)	4:14
8.	"Semper Fidelis Tyrannosauruses"	3:58
9.	"Swifty"	4:48
Total length:		35:01

== Personnel ==
- Lee Zook – lead vocals, keyboards
- Bobby Huotari – bass, backing vocals
- David Sanders – guitar
- Michael Pak – drums
- Jay Hathaway – guitar, backing vocals

Additional personnel

- Produced and mixed by Jamie King
- Guest vocals on track 4 by Karl Schubach
- Guest vocals on track 7 by Micah Kinard
