= James E. McInerney Jr. =

United States Air Force officer

James Eugene McInerney Jr.
- Born: 3 August 1930; Springfield, Massachusetts, U.S.
- Died: 14 October 2014 (aged 84); Walter Reed National Military Medical Center, U.S.
- Burial place: West Point Cemetery
- Relatives: Thomas McInerney (brother)
- Military career
- Allegiance: United States of America
- Branch: United States Army; United States Air Force
- Service years: 1947–1980
- Rank: Major General
- Commands: 13th Tactical Fighter Squadron; 44th Tactical Fighter Squadron; 86th Tactical Fighter Wing; 26th Tactical Reconnaissance Wing
- Conflicts: Korean conflict Vietnam War
- Awards: Air Force Cross; Distinguished Service Medal; Silver Star (3); Distinguished Flying Cross (7); Bronze Star; Meritorious Service Medal (2); Air Medal (18); Vietnamese Cross of Gallantry with palm and with star Cheonsu Medal; Commander of the British Empire

Major General James E. McInerney Jr. (3 August 1930 – 14 October 2014) was a United States Air Force (USAF) officer.

== Early life and education ==
McInerney was born in Springfield, Massachusetts, on 3 August 1930, the eldest of five children born to United States Army officer James E. McInerney and Rose Adikes McInerney. He graduated from Georgia Military Academy.

== Military career ==
He enlisted in the United States Army in September 1947 and served as a parachute infantryman until June 1948 when he entered United States Military Academy (USMA) at West Point. He graduated in June 1952 and then attended primary, basic and advanced flying schools.

In December 1953 he was assigned to Air Defense Command as a fighter-interceptor pilot and later was transferred to South Korea as a flight commander in the 80th Fighter-Bomber Squadron. In September 1954 he was transferred to the 35th Fighter-Bomber Squadron at Itazuke Air Base, Japan, as squadron maintenance officer and later as operations officer. On 10 May 1955 he shot down the last MiG-15 destroyed by United Nations Command forces in Korea.

He returned to the United States in October 1955 and was assigned to the 1738th Ferrying Squadron, Military Air Transport Service (MATS), Kelly Air Force Base, Texas. In March 1958 he was assigned to the Chief Pilot Division, Headquarters MATS, Scott Air Force Base, Illinois. In August 1958 he entered Princeton University under the Air Force Institute of Technology program and graduated in 1960 with a master of science degree in aeronautical engineering. In June 1960 he was assigned to the Research and Development Section, Fighter Weapons School, Nellis Air Force Base, Nevada.

In January 1964 he became a student at the RAF Staff College, Bracknell, England. He was transferred to the U.S. Air Forces in Europe (USAFE) in January 1965, and served with the 36th Tactical Fighter Wing at Bitburg Air Base, West Germany. When the wing was designated to become the first USAFE wing to be equipped with the McDonnell Douglas F-4D Phantom II, he was assigned as chief, F-4 Conversion Office, responsible for planning, coordinating and implementing the changeover from the Republic F-105 Thunderchief aircraft.

In March 1967 he was assigned to the 388th Tactical Fighter Wing at Korat Royal Thai Air Force Base, Thailand, as commander of the 13th Tactical Fighter Squadron and later became commander of the 44th Tactical Fighter Squadron. During this period, he commanded the F-105D and F-105F unit which conducted Wild Weasel surface-to-air missile (SAM) destruction, "Ryan Raider" night-penetration missions and deep-strike interdiction sorties against the most heavily defended targets in North Vietnam. For his actions in that role, he was awarded the Air Force Association "Citation of Honor" for outstanding combat leadership in developing new tactics for the conduct of the air war in Southeast Asia.

On 11 March 1967 his younger brother Richard was killed in action while commanding D Company, 2nd Battalion, 5th Cavalry Regiment in South Vietnam.

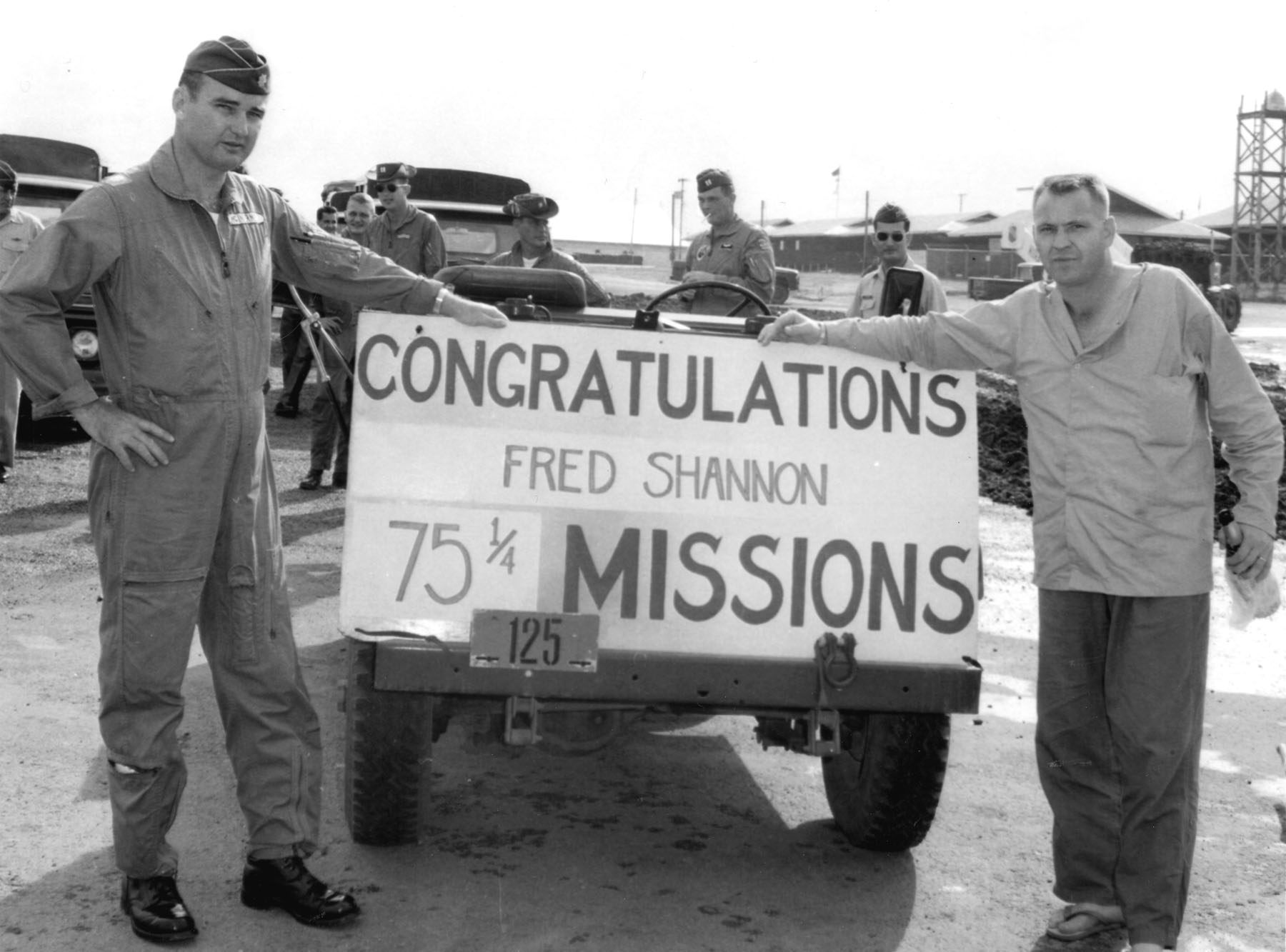
McInerney (l) and Shannon (r) after their ejection in September 1967

On 11 August 1967, McInerney and his electronic warfare officer Captain Fred Shannon led the Wild Weasel flight covering the first airstrike against the heavily-defended Paul Doumer Bridge in Hanoi, North Vietnam. During the strike, McInerney and Shannon destroyed two SA-2 SAM sites and suppressed four others. They flew through intense anti-aircraft artillery fire and dodged the three SA-2s launched at their flight. The strike force completely severed the bridge, and not a single aircraft was lost. For their heroism and skill, McInerney and Shannon were each awarded the Air Force Cross. He completed 101 combat missions over North Vietnam.

In November 1967 he joined Headquarters Pacific Air Forces as staff officer in the Operations Plans Division. In August 1969 he entered the National War College, Washington, D.C. While attending the National War College, he obtained his master of science degree in international relations from George Washington University.

In August 1970 he was assigned as chairman of the Department of Defense Air Munitions Requirements and Development Committee in The Pentagon. In this position, he directed a joint service effort to achieve standardization of air munitions under the guidance of the director of defense research and engineering. In July 1971 he became chief of the Development Plans and Analysis Group in the office of the deputy chief of staff, research and development, Headquarters U.S. Air Force.

He returned to West Germany in October 1971, as commander of the 86th Tactical Fighter Wing at Zweibrucken Air Base. When the mission of the wing changed in January 1973, he became commander of the 26th Tactical Reconnaissance Wing. In July 1973 he was named chief of the Air Force Section, Joint U.S. Military Mission for Aid to Turkey, at Ankara, Turkey.

Upon completion of his tour of duty in Turkey, he became director of military assistance and sales, office of the deputy chief of staff, systems and logistics, Headquarters U.S. Air Force, Washington, D.C., in August 1975. He was promoted to the grade of major general on 6 February 1976, with date of rank 22 June 1973. He was commandant of the Industrial College of the Armed Forces at Fort Lesley J. McNair before assuming duty as director of programs, deputy chief of staff programs and analysis, Headquarters U.S. Air Force in January 1979. He retired from the USAF in 1980.

He was a command pilot with more than 5,400 flying hours in T-33, T-38, F-80, F-84, F-86, F-94, F-100, F-102, F-104, F-105, F-106, F-4, F-5, F-15, Hunter, Lightning and Mirage III aircraft.

== Later life ==
From 1992 to 2010 he worked for the National Defense Industrial Association.

He helped establish the American Air Museum at Imperial War Museum, Duxford, for which he was made a Commander of the British Empire in June 2000.

He died on 14 October 2014 at Walter Reed National Military Medical Center. He was buried at West Point Cemetery with his wife Mary Catherine who died in July 2011, his mother and father (USMA 1923), and his younger brothers John (USMA 1959) and Richard (USMA 1960).

== Decorations ==
His military decorations and awards include the Air Force Cross, Distinguished Service Medal, Silver Star with two oak leaf clusters, Distinguished Flying Cross with six oak leaf clusters, Bronze Star, Meritorious Service Medal with oak leaf cluster, Air Medal with 17 oak leaf clusters, Air Force Commendation Medal, Presidential Unit Citation emblem, Air Force Outstanding Unit Award ribbon with "V" device and two oak leaf clusters, the Vietnamese Cross of Gallantry with palm and with star and the South Korean Cheonsu Medal.

USAF Command pilot badge
USAF Parachutist badge
| Air Force Cross | | Air Force Distinguished Service Medal with bronze oak leaf cluster |
| Silver Star with two bronze oak leaf clusters | Distinguished Flying Cross with silver and bronze oak leaf clusters | Bronze Star Medal |
| Meritorious Service Medal with bronze oak leaf cluster | Air Medal with three silver and one bronze oak leaf clusters | Air Medal (second ribbon required for accouterment spacing) |
| Air Force Commendation Medal | Air Force Presidential Unit Citation with bronze oak leaf cluster | Air Force Outstanding Unit Award with Valor device and three bronze oak leaf clusters |
| National Defense Service Medal with service star | Korean Service Medal | Armed Forces Expeditionary Medal |
| Vietnam Service Medal with two bronze campaign stars | Korean Defense Service Medal | Air Force Overseas Short Tour Service Ribbon with bronze oak leaf cluster |
| Air Force Overseas Long Tour Service Ribbon with three bronze oak leaf clusters | Air Force Longevity Service Award with silver and bronze oak leaf clusters | Small Arms Expert Marksmanship Ribbon |
| South Korean Order of National Security Merit; Cheonsu Medal | Republic of Vietnam Gallantry Cross with bronze star | Commander of the Most Excellent Order of the British Empire |
| Republic of Vietnam Gallantry Cross Unit Citation | United Nations Korea Medal | Vietnam Campaign Medal |

=== Air Force Cross citation ===

==== Citation ====
The President of the United States of America, authorized by Title 10, Section 8742, United States Code, takes pleasure in presenting the Air Force Cross to Lieutenant Colonel James Eugene McInerney, Jr., United States Air Force, for extraordinary heroism in military operations against an opposing armed force as Pilot of an F-105 airplane in the 13th Tactical Fighter Squadron, 388th Tactical Fighter Wing, Korat Royal Thai Air Base, Thailand, 7th Air Force, in action as Leader of a flak suppression flight in action against the Paul Doumer Bridge, a major north-south transportation link on Hanoi’s Red River in North Vietnam, on 11 August 1967. On that date, Colonel McInerney suppressed six active surface-to-air missile sites defending a strategic highway and railroad bridge. Despite concentrated barrages of anti-aircraft fire and three missiles directed against his flight, Colonel McInerney displayed the highest degree of courageous leadership in destroying two missile sites and forcing the other four into sporadic operation. As a direct result of his actions, the strike force suffered no losses and imposed extensive damage to this vital target. Through his extraordinary heroism, superb airmanship, and aggressiveness in the face of hostile forces, Lieutenant Colonel McInerney reflected the highest credit upon himself and the United States Air Force.
