= Paul E. Vallely =

American Army general

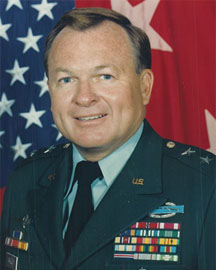
- Major General Vallely
- Born: November 29, 1939 (age 86); DuBois, Pennsylvania, U.S.
- Allegiance: United States of America
- Branch: United States Army
- Service years: 1961–1991
- Rank: Major general
- Commands: 7th PSYOP Group; 351st Civil Affairs Command
- Conflicts: Vietnam War

Paul E. Vallely (born November 29, 1939) is a retired United States Army major general and former senior military analyst for Fox News.

Vallely served in the Vietnam War and retired in 1991 as deputy commanding general, United States Army Pacific. In 1980, Vallely co-authored the US Army paper From PSYOP to MindWar with Michael Aquino. In 2004, together with retired Air Force lieutenant general Thomas McInerney, he co-authored the book Endgame: The Blueprint for Victory in the War on Terror, published by Regnery Publishing, which borrows, philosophically from Mind War.

He has served as military committee chairman for the Center for Security Policy, and runs the conservative political organization Stand Up America US. He is a member of the advisory council for Turning Point USA.

== Personal life ==
Vallely was born in DuBois, Pennsylvania, on November 29, 1939. He is married to former Marian Hatch. He moved with his wife from Washington, D.C. to Bigfork, Montana, in 2003. Their son, Private First Class Scott Paul Vallely, died on April 20, 2004, while in his fourth week of Special Forces Qualification Course Special Forces training.

== Military service ==
Vallely graduated from West Point and was commissioned into the U.S. Army in 1961. He graduated from Infantry School, Ranger and Airborne Schools, Jumpmaster School, the Command and General Staff School, The Industrial College of the Armed Forces and the Army War College. His combat service in Vietnam included positions as infantry company commander, intelligence officer, operations officer, military adviser and aide-de-camp. He was later the commander of the 7th Psychological Operations Group around 1980, and of the 351st Civil Affairs Command from 1982 to 1986, which included all Special Forces, Psychological Warfare and Civil Military units in the Western United States and Hawaii. He retired in 1991 from his position in Hawaii as deputy commanding general, United States Army Pacific, at the rank of major general.

== Activities and views ==
Vallely made his first appearance on Fox News on the day after the September 11 attacks in 2001, and gained national prominence as Fox News' senior military analyst during the 2003 invasion of Iraq. He worked as a Fox News analyst until 2007.

=== Stand Up America US ===
In 2005 Vallely founded a conservative political organization called Stand Up America US that promotes "First amendment rights, Second amendment rights, strong national defense, and secure borders, national sovereignty, support of the armed forces, individual liberties and personal responsibility, fiscally responsible, limited government." According to co-founder and retired Air Force Lt. Gen. Thomas McInerney, its stated purpose is to "protect America and let people understand the danger of radical Islam and the seriousness of global jihad."

As part of the organization, Vallely has also founded the Legacy National Security Advisory Group, a defense consulting group that advised 2016 Republican presidential candidates on foreign policy. Vallely has traveled to countries such as Egypt and Syria in the Middle East, and collects information from a network of experts and informants around the world. Other members of the group include retired Navy Adm. James Lyons and Marine Corps Lt. Col. Oliver North.

In 2016, the organization published "A Counterjihad Security Architecture for America", a document edited by Clare Lopez, with Vallely stating that "Counterjihad security architecture and strategies are more necessary now than ever before".

=== Other organizations ===
Vallely has served as the military committee chairman for the Washington, D.C.–based Center for Security Policy.

He has also lent his support to an organization called Veteran Defenders of America. In his letter of support he stated that "perhaps the greatest threat to our safety and liberty is the threat of radical Islam. This threat goes well beyond the threat of terrorism. Islamists, both inside and outside of America, are looking for any and every way to infiltrate and subvert our country through what is known as 'stealth jihad.' He encourages U.S. civilians (veterans) to be "eyes and ears of freedom, because we know freedom isn't free."

Vallely is also a supporter of the Jerusalem Summit and an advocate of the organization's proposal to "transfer" Palestinians to surrounding Arab countries as a solution to the Israeli–Palestinian conflict.

He has spoken to a local chapter of ACT for America on the European refugee crisis.

=== Support of birther claims ===
In 2010 Vallely was one of three retired general officers who expressed support for U.S. Army Lt. Col. Terrance Lee Lakin in his refusal to deploy to Afghanistan based on Lakin's claim that President Barack Obama had no legitimacy as commander in chief. In an interview, Vallely stated, "I think many in the military—and many out of the military—question the natural-birth status of Barack Obama." Following Vallely's announcement, retired Army Maj. Gen. Jerry Curry and Air Force Lt. Gen. Thomas McInerney also expressed public support for Lakin.

Vallely has also said that he "firmly believes Obama 'is a Muslim in nature'," and that "a 'civil uprising' was not 'out of the question' to stop Obama who was facilitating the rise of 'radical Islam, the caliphate, and Jihad – the slow infiltration and dismantling of our American institutions' either 'willfully, or due to sheer naiveté'." Vallely has later alleged that both versions of Obama's released birth certificate were forgeries, covered up by the FBI and Congress.

In 2013, Vallely said to a Tea Party group that while he did not want to see a revolution take place, if a revolution did happen then he would be happy to lead it. He said he would agree to lead a coup against Obama if given the troops, stating that he would lead "250,000 Marines to go to Washington" and "I’ll surround the White House and I’ll surround the Capitol building".

=== QAnon ===
Vallely is a supporter of QAnon, which he has described as a "white hat" operation, and a "cadre of retired military intelligence officers" that is tied to information from "a group of military intelligence specialists of over 800 people that advise the president". He has praised Q as a "legitimate source that releases 'real intelligence, fact-based intelligence' to the public." In 2020 he was also one of 235 senior military leaders backing Donald Trump for re-election.

== Works ==
=== From PSYOP to MindWar ===
In 1980, Vallely co-authored a paper with then military PSYOP analyst Michael Archy Aquino, founder of the Satanist Temple of Set as his commanding officer in the 7th PSYOP Group, titled From PSYOP to MindWar: The Psychology of Victory. MindWar is defined as "the deliberate aggressive convincing of all participants in a war that we will win that war." The paper contrasts a use of psychological operations such as propaganda with a new approach. In a new 2003 introduction of the paper, Aquino notes how it became a widespread subject of conspiracy theories.

=== Bibliography ===
- Endgame: The Blueprint for Victory in the War on Terror. Co-authored with McInerney, Thomas. Regnery. 2004. ISBN 978-0895260000.
- Baghdad Ablaze: How to Extinguish the Fires in Iraq. Co-authored with Tanter, Raymond; McInerney, Thomas; McCalm, Bruce. Iran Policy Committee. 2007. ISBN 978-0979705106.
- Blood for Our Future: Operation Sucker Punch. Co-authored with Collins, Kevin. Stand Up America US. 2009. ISBN 978-0615196886.
- Reality Prism: A Raven Novel. Co-authored with Trudel, John D. Trudel. 2022. ISBN 978-0997805208.
- America's End Game for the 21st Century: A Blueprint for Saving Our Country. Co-authored with McInerney, Thomas; Goetsch, David L. Fidelis. 2022. ISBN 978-1956454178.
- Mindless War Two: Prism Truths Notes #1'. Co-authored with Trudel, John D. John D. Trudel. 2023. ISBN 978-0997805260.
- Invisible Treason in America. Co-authored with McInerney, Thomas. John D. Trudel. 2023. ISBN 979-8987766590.
