= Blood of the Martyrs =

American Christian metal band

- Also known as: BOTM
- Origin: Farmville, Virginia, U.S.
- Genres: Deathcore; metalcore; symphonic metal; Christian metal
- Years active: 2007–2017; 2023–2024
- Label: Dark Slate
- Past members: Lee Zook; Bobby Huotari; David Sanders; Wesley Hackelton; Nathan Stables; Brian Paulette; Travis Lilley; Hayden Caldwell; Chris Oberholtzer; Tyler Ferrell; Jay Hathaway; Michael "Pak Man" Pak; Jason Wilkins
- Website: Facebook Page

Blood of the Martyrs was an American metalcore band from Farmville, Virginia, formed in 2007. The band released two studio albums and an EP before going on an extended hiatus in 2017. The band returned from hiatus in 2023, reuniting with original vocalist Lee Zook, and announced they were working on a new EP and would be officially breaking up once the EP was released.

The band has gone through several lineup changes, leaving Bobby Huotari as the band's only original member.

== History ==
=== Formation and Once More, with Feeling ===
The band formed in late-2007 by bassist Bobby Huotari (original drummer) in the small town of Farmville, Virginia. Since its formation Blood of the Martyrs has undergone numerous line-up changes making Huotari the only original member of the band. Blood of the Martyrs has gained a reputation as a hard-working DIY act, who, has completed numerous self booked and managed tours since the release of their debut album, Once More, with Feeling, which was recorded at Pendlewood Studios in Columbus, Ohio, and was released April 2011.

=== Line-up changes and Completionist ===
After various tours spanning across 30+ states of the U.S and a cover of the Thirty Seconds to Mars song "The Kill" was released on November 23, 2011. The band announced on August 17, 2012, that they were working on a new album and released the single and video for the song "Colonel Gentleman". Much wasn't heard about the album, until the song "The Action Man" (featuring Karl Schubach of Misery Signals) was released on June 14, 2013. The band's second album, Completionist, was released independently on October 4, 2013. The album featured a re-recorded version of "Colonel Gentleman" with Micah Kinard of Oh, Sleeper on guest vocals and also had an updated version of the demo "Semper Fidelis Tyrannosauruses".

Blood of the Martyrs has garnered an extensive touring history despite being a largely independent band, touring with numerous artist off of Facedown Records, Solid State Records, Rise Records, InVogue Records, Victory Records, Tribunal Records, as well as other unsigned acts.

=== New vocalist, Endgame and hiatus ===
In early 2014 the band announced that they had started to write new music. The band announced that they would be releasing an updated version of "Lady Nightshade" from their debut album as a single for free download. The single was released on August 15 and featured touring vocalist Eric Hendricks. The band began releasing song teasers from their upcoming album, though a permanent vocalist had not been announced at the time; Jason Wilkins, former vocalist for Gethsemane, was later announced as the band's new vocalist in 2015. On January 22, 2016, Blood of the Martyrs premiered a video for their new song "The Devil's Grip", the lead single from their upcoming EP Endgame. On February 14 the band released the second single from Endgame, titled "Dr. Killinger".

Over a year after the release of Endgame, the band went into an indefinite hiatus. The members focused on other projects with Huotari focusing on his film-making career.

=== Return of Zook, Here at the End of All Things, and breakup ===
One June 23, 2023, six years after the band's hiatus started, vocalist/keyboardist Lee Zook announced he was back in the band. He also announced that the band's final release, the EP Here at the End of All Things, would be released later that year. On October 2, 2024, the band announced that the EP would be released on October 31. Here at the End of All Things was released for streaming via YouTube on October 31, while its release was delayed on other platforms due to the band tagging the songs as explicit due to the lyrics covering sensitive topics such as self-harm and self-medication. The EP was produced by Andrew "Drewsif" Reynolds at Baja Blue Studio in Austin, Texas.

== Style ==
Blood of the Martyrs is a heavy based band and is heavily influenced by the metalcore and deathcore subgenres while incorporating elements of electronic music and symphonic metal into their songs. They are well known for their high live energy and performance.

== Members ==
Final line-up

- Lee Zook – lead vocals, keyboards (2008–2014; 2023–2024)
- Bobby Huotari – bass, backing vocals (2011–2017; 2023–2024); drums (2007–2011; 2023–2024)
- Wesley Hackelton – guitars (2012–2013 (touring); 2023–2024)

Former

- Nathan Stables – bass (2007–2009)
- Brian Paulette – guitars (2009–2012)
- Travis Lilley – bass (2009–2011)
- Hayden Caldwell – guitars (2010–2011)
- Chris Oberholtzer – guitars, backing vocals (2011–2012)
- Tyler Ferrell – drums (2011–2012)
- Jay Hathaway – guitars, backing vocals (2012–2013)
- Michael "Pak Man" Pak – drums (2012–2017)
- David Sanders – guitars (2012–2017)
- Jason Wilkins – lead vocals (2015–2017)

Touring musicians

- Eric Hendricks – lead vocals (2014)

Timeline

== Discography ==
Blood of the Martyrs discography
- Studio albums: 2
- EPs: 2
- Singles: 9
- Music videos: 4

=== Studio albums ===
- Once More, with Feeling (2011)
- Completionist (2013)

=== Extended plays ===
- Endgame (2016)
- Here at the End of All Things (2024)

=== Demos ===
- Pendlewood Studios (2010)

=== Singles ===
Song	Released	Album
"The Kill" (Thirty Seconds to Mars cover)	November 23, 2011	Non-album single
"Colonel Gentleman"	August 17, 2012	Completionist
"The Action Man" (feat. Karl Schubach)	June 14, 2013	Completionist
"Gone Away" (The Offspring cover)	August 9, 2013	Non-album single
"Swifty"	October 4, 2013	Completionist
"H.E.L.P.eR."	October 30, 2013	Completionist
"Lady Nightshade" (reissue)	August 15, 2014	Non-album single
"The Devil's Grip"	January 22, 2016	Endgame
"Dr. Killinger"	February 14, 2016	Endgame

=== Music videos ===
Year	Song	Director
2012	"Colonel Gentleman"	Bobby Huotari
2013	"Swifty"	Elifant Productions
2013	"H.E.L.P.eR.	Elifant Productions
2016	"The Devil's Grip"	David Borges
