= Court-martial of Terry Lakin =

2010 criminal trial of US Army surgeon

The court-martial of Terry Lakin (United States v. LTC LAKIN, Terrence L.) was a United States Army criminal trial that found Terrence Lakin guilty on four counts of disobeying orders and one count of missing movement.

The trial took place over 14–16 December 2010. Doctor Terry Lakin, a lieutenant colonel in the United States Army, announced that he would refuse deployment, and subsequently refused to deploy to Afghanistan because of his concerns over President Obama's constitutional eligibility to be president. It was Lakin's hope that he could request a copy of Obama's birth certificate as part of a court-martial, a goal that had eluded previous military defendants. Lakin had the support of three retired American generals.

Before Lakin went to court-martial, it was found by the judge that President Obama's eligibility (and hence his birth certificate) had no bearing on the case. Lakin pleaded guilty to two charges while pleading not-guilty to one other. Despite recanting his original concerns and asking the jury for leniency, Lakin was found guilty of all charges and sentenced to dismissal from the Army, loss of pay and allowances, and a prison term of six months. Lakin was released from the United States Disciplinary Barracks after serving five of his six months. He was later denied a medical license in Kansas as a result of his dereliction of duty.

== Background ==
Terrence Lee Lakin
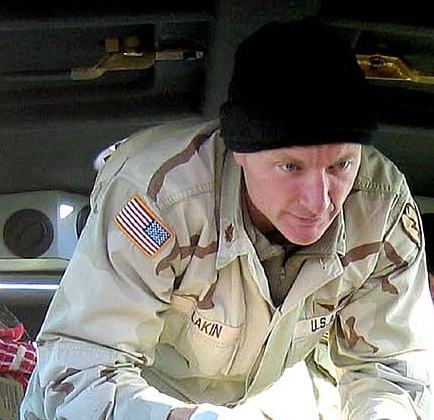
- Lakin in Afghanistan (2005)
- Other name: Terry Lakin
- Education: Colorado College; Kansas City U. (DO); Uniformed Svs. U. (MPH)
- Occupation: Physician
- Known for: Refusing to deploy
- Criminal charges: UCMJ articles 87 & 92
- Criminal penalty: 5 months imprisonment & dismissal from US Army
- Criminal status: Released (13 May 2011)
- Military career
- Allegiance: United States
- Branch: United States Army
- Service years: 1991 or 1992 – 2011
- Rank: Lieutenant colonel
- Units: 4th Cavalry (2005); JTF CapMed (Mar. 2010); WRAMC (Apr. 2010); USDB (Dec. 2010)

Terrence Lee Lakin is a native of Greeley, Colorado, and graduated from University High School. As of 2019, Lakin was married with three children.

After studying biology at Colorado College in 1987, Lakin attended medical school at the Kansas City University of Medicine and Biosciences in 1993, and completed his residency at Womack Army Medical Center. Lakin's postgraduate education was undertaken at the Uniformed Services University of the Health Sciences in 2007. He has a doctorate in osteopathic medicine and a master's degree in public health.

Lakin deployed with the US Army six times prior to his dismissal from the service. In 2005, while assigned as a flight surgeon to the 4th Cavalry Regiment, then-Major Lakin was named as the Army Medical Department's Flight Surgeon of the Year for 2004. Prior to his court-martial, Lakin was awarded two Achievement Medals, three Army Commendation Medals, one Meritorious Service Medal, and one Bronze Star Medal; he was also a US Army selectee for promotion to colonel.

After the 2008 election of Barack Obama, Lakin fruitlessly attempted to personally certify the president's constitutional eligibility for the office through his congressional representatives and his military chain of command. To his Army superiors, Lakin argued that "he believed that based on their oath of office to protect and defend the Constitution, military officers should be allowed to demand proof of the President's eligibility."

== Refusal to deploy ==
Assigned to the DiLorenzo TRICARE Health Clinic (a constituent command of Joint Task Force National Capital Region Medical), then-Lieutenant Colonel (LTC) Lakin had orders to report to Fort Campbell, Kentucky on 12 April 2010, for his second deployment to Afghanistan.

Lakin described his orders as "illegal", because as "all orders have their origin with the commander-in-chief", and since he claimed that President Obama had not satisfactorily proven his constitutional eligibility for his station, those orders could not be followed. After researching what options were open to him, Lakin approached the American Patriot Foundation, Inc. (APF) with his idea for a video wherein he would explain his reasons for intending to disobey orders. Margaret Hemenway, spokesperson for the APF, told the Greeley Tribune that she had directed Lakin to speak with a lawyer who attempted to dissuade the soldier, and that Lakin filmed the video anyway.

On 30 March 2010, the APF posted Lakin's video to YouTube. In the video, Lakin invited his court-martial not only to cause the president's legitimacy to be scrutinized, but also because he wanted the president to produce his original 1961 birth certificate to prove his "birth on American soil" and natural born-status. Hemenway, speaking for the APF to Salon, repeatedly claimed that President Obama hadn't even released the same birth certificate Lakin had to give the military. (At the time of Lakin's demands, Hawaii did not release images or copies of original birth certificates, and President Obama had already released an image of the record of his birth as provided by the Hawaii Department of Health.) The APF also raised funds to assist in Lakin's defense.

Prior to 12 April, Army officials stated they were aware of Lakin's intent to "violate articles 87 and 92 of [the] Uniform Code of Military Justice", but until he did so they had nothing further upon which to comment. Instead of complying with his deployment orders, Lakin reported to the Pentagon. After being Mirandized and informed by his commanding officer—Colonel Gordon Ray Roberts—that he would face court-martial, Lakin's Pentagon access badge and governmental laptop were confiscated. Pending his court-martial, Lakin was assigned to duty at Walter Reed Army Medical Center in Washington, D.C.

=== Analysis ===
Salon contributor Alex Koppelman noted that LTC Lakin was not the first US military member to "become a birther cause celebre", indicating the cases of Major Stefan F. Cook (Cook v. Good) and Captain Connie Rhodes (Rhodes v. MacDonald). Koppelman explained that neither of these lawsuits succeeded in a ruling on Obama's eligibility to be president. In contrast, since a court case (in this case, a court-martial) was the likely conclusion to Lakin's actions, his attorneys hoped that he could seek President Obama's original birth certificate for use in his defense.

Chris Lawrence, CNN's Pentagon correspondent, noted in August 2010 that an Opinion Research Corporation poll showed that 27% of "Americans think President Obama probably or definitely was not born in the United States." Lawrence reported that some of the remaining 73% argued that legal cases like Lakin's are fundraising opportunities for "certain political causes."

=== Support for Lakin ===
When contacted by the Greeley Tribune in spring 2010, Lakin's father—Frank Lakin—said that his son's video "does not reflect the opinions or the attitude of the family by any means […] We're Obama supporters."

Prior to Lakin officially violating his order to deploy, former Republican US Senator Bob Smith, who founded the American Patriot Foundation, said: "...my personal belief is that when an officer has a constitutional question I don't have a problem with that being answered, that's his legal right to have that answered, but I'm not involved in it." Jelani Cobb with The New Yorker reported in 2016 that then-Congressional Representative Tom Price spoke about Lakin in 2009/2010, saying that the lieutenant-colonel had raised salient questions about President Obama's eligibility for office.

Three retired United States generals expressed support for Lakin. The first was retired Army Major General Paul E. Vallely, a senior military analyst for Fox News. In an interview, Vallely stated "I think many in the military – and many out of the military – question the natural-birth status of Barack Obama." Following Vallely's announcement, retired Army Major General Jerry Curry and retired Air Force Lieutenant General (and Fox News analyst) Thomas McInerney also expressed public support for Lakin.

== Court-martial ==
United States v. Lakin
- United States Army Military District of Washington (MDW) shoulder sleeve insignia
- Court: US Army MDW
- Full case name: United States v. LTC LAKIN, Terrence L.
- Decided: 16 December 2010
- Transcript

Case history
- Appealed to: Court of Criminal Appeals (automatic; withdrawn)

Court membership
- Judge sitting: Denise R. Lind; Colonel, JA, US Army

=== Pre-trial ===
Lakin's civilian lawyer—Costa Mesa, California-based personal injury lawyer Paul Rolf Jensen—pursued the tack that if the president's original 1961 birth certificate were released, and if it proved that presidential ineligibility, "the prosecution would have no taste for ending Col. Lakin's career." When asked about the president's already-released record of birth, Jensen replied, "I don't know what you're seeing but I haven't seen an original long form certificate signed by the doctor that gave birth to him, the very same document that Colonel Lakin was ordered to produced [sic] in order to deploy."

On 6 August 2010, in a Virginia courtroom with standing-room only, Lakin was charged with "three charges of disobeying a lawful order, one count of missing movement (not deploying with his unit) and one count of dereliction of duty." He and his legal team petitioned the military judge—Colonel Denise Lind—for a delay in pleading to allow for time to file a motion to dismiss. Judge Lind allowed the defense a two-week delay for that purpose, and a third successive week to allow both parties "to formulate and send written responses to the motion." The motion's hearings were scheduled for 2 and 14 September, and if the motion failed, the court-martial was scheduled to start on October 13. Lakin also waived his choice of either a bench trial or a jury trial.

In September, Lind ruled that whether President Obama was constitutionally qualified for office had no legal bearing on Lakin's case. As such, Lakin could not make any demands for the president's birth certificate as part of his trial. After Lind's ruling, defendant Lakin dismissed defense attorney Jensen, going on to hire retired United States Marine Corps Colonel Neal Puckett as counsel. Puckett disagreed with Lakin's tack of approaching his constitutional misgivings by disobeying orders, but felt that his client's decision was "a courageous act of civil disobedience" nonetheless. Ultimately, because of Lind's ruling, Puckett felt that Lakin would probably be convicted.

=== Trial ===
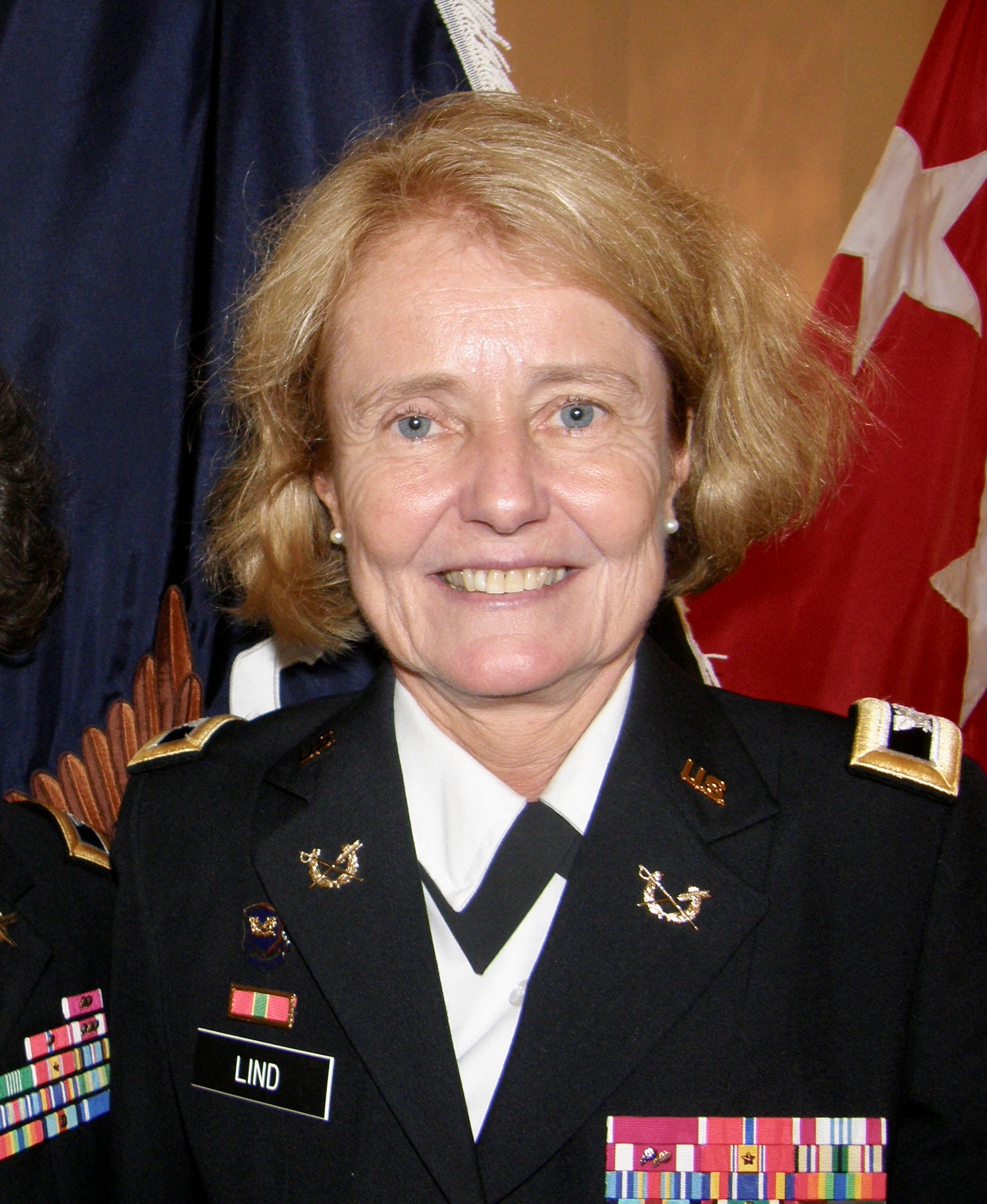
Colonel Lind, trial judge (2015)

On 14 December 2010, the first day of Lakin's court-martial at Fort Meade, Lakin pleaded guilty to four counts of disobeying orders (with one being dismissed as redundant at the request of his counsel), and pleaded not guilty to missing movement, considered the gravest of his charges. Judge Lind accepted Lakin's guilty pleas and convicted him duly. The court-martial continued on the second charge. As to missing movement, Puckett argued that Lakin's orders did not specifically require the surgeon to fly, and that he could have opted to "choose an alternate method of travel." Jurors were asked about their awareness of the "birther movement".

Facing up to 3.5 years in military prison and dismissal from the Army, on 15 December, Lakin changed tack and stated that he was wrong to question the president's qualifications through his military service. He requested that the jury allow him to continue his career in the military ("I don't want it to end this way, I want to continue to serve"), and that he would now undertake his deployment if he could, even with his concerns about the president unaddressed. The defense brought witnesses before the court to testify on Lakin's behalf, describing the accused as a "compassionate physician" who always volunteered to help when needed. The prosecution introduced the officer that was deployed in Lakin's stead, who testified alongside his wife about how the last-minute deployment affected their lives.

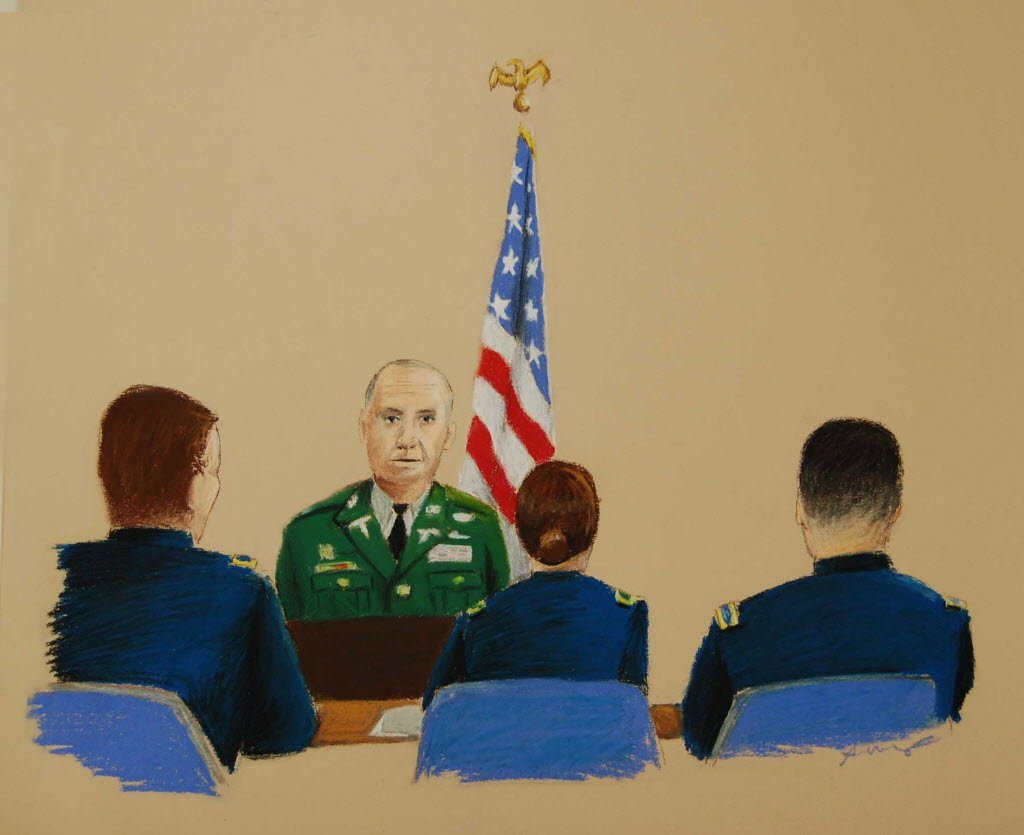
Lakin at sentencing

Lakin was found guilty of all charges on 16 December. After five hours of deliberation, the jury sentenced him to six months in a military prison, forfeiture of all pay and allowances, and dismissal from the Army (the officer equivalent to a dishonorable discharge). The sentence was approved by Major General Karl Horst. Lakin would begin his sentence immediately, though an automatic appeal would go before the United States Army Court of Criminal Appeals.

== Confinement and beyond ==
Lakin served five months in the United States Disciplinary Barracks at Fort Leavenworth, being released a month early on 13 May 2011. On 28 July 2011, the United States Army Court of Criminal Appeals granted Lakin's request to withdraw his case from appellate review.

Speaking on the subject of his outstanding appeals in June 2011, Lakin foresaw no complications in continuing to practice medicine. On 21 October 2011, the Kansas State Board of Healing Arts denied Lakin a license to practice medicine in Kansas saying he "potentially jeopardized the health, safety and welfare of the military troops for which applicant was employed to provide medical care."

Lakin later co-authored a 2012 book on his experiences, Officer's Oath: Why My Vow to Defend the Constitution Demanded that I Sacrifice My Career. By 16 August 2014, Lakin was working for the Southern Colorado Clinic in Pueblo, Colorado, though he was removed from their list of practitioners between June 2021 and March 2022.

On 21 January 2017, a petition at We the People was created by "G.W." entitled, "Reinstate Lt. Col. Terry Lakin into the U.S. Army with full rank, pay, benefits and pension immediately." In its 30-day run, only 6143 people signed the petition, only six percent of what was required to receive an official response from the Trump administration (100,000). In early 2017, Michael Miner with the Chicago Reader spoke with Marco Ciavolino, a close friend of Lakin and editor of the onetime lieutenant-colonel's 2012 book. Ciavolino says he told President Trump's personal lawyer Michael Cohen about pardoning Lakin, as it would "allow Lakin to recover hundreds of thousands of dollars in back pay and benefits, and make him eligible to go back into the army." Both Lakin and Ciavolino bemoaned the petition as premature; arriving right after Trump's inauguration, it was likely "there's a lot of more urgent things going on." Miner noted the possibility that, even if the petition had received 100,000 signatures, the new president had previously vacillated on the subject of Obama's citizenship.

As of February 2017, the Terry Lakin Action Fund site still claimed that President Obama's birth certificates are forgeries, and says of Lakin himself:

It is our position that Dr. Lakin took a principled, rational, and well-thought-out action to protect the integrity of our Constitution. He was not in the street being shot by water cannons or part of mass actions. He is one man who has stood alone to defend a key provision of our Constitution. He should be rewarded.
