= Endgame: The Blueprint for Victory in the War on Terror =

- Author: Lt.General Thomas McInerney and Major General Paul E. Vallely
- Genre: non-fiction
- Publisher: Regnery
- Publication date: 2004
- Pages: 212 pages
- ISBN: 0895260662
- OCLC: 54529050

Endgame: The Blueprint for Victory in the War on Terror (ISBN 0-89526-066-2, 2004) is a book by Lt.General Thomas McInerney, US Air Force, and Major General Paul E. Vallely, US Army, with forward remarks by CIA Director James Woolsey. It describes a super secret weapon system that is intended to neutralize nuclear weapons.

"I call upon the scientific community in our country, those who gave us nuclear weapons, to turn their talents now to the cause of mankind and world peace, to give us the means of rendering those weapons impotent and obsolete."—President Ronald Reagan, Address to the Nation, March 23, 1983,

The book states: "In Rowan Scarborough's book, Rumsfeld's War, it was revealed that the Israeli defense forces have eighty-two nuclear weapons as part of their nuclear deterrence force. In our research for this book we discovered that a group of countries, led by Israel, the U.S. and Italy, had been working since 1981 on a mega-secret project to develop and deploy a weapon system that can neutralize nuclear weapons. The highly advanced, space-deployed, BHB weapon system, code-named XXXBHB-BACAR-1318-I390MSCH, has extraordinary potential and is the key part of the West's deterrence strategy. For the past twenty-five years, the project and the scientists involved in it were kept in strict secrecy and their existence denied. ... In 1981, when president Ronald Reagan and CIA director William J. Casey agreed and signed onto the SDI (Strategic Defense Initiative) — a missile defense shield against incoming nuclear warheads — they gave the green light for the secret development of the BHB weapon for deterrence purposes and peaceful use only. Although we have only limited information, it appears that Iran's rapidly developing nuclear capabilities could be neutralized and rendered obsolete, as could the capabilities of other rogue countries.

== See also ==
- Mutual assured destruction
- Brinkmanship
