= Elizabeth Hadly =

American professor of biology

Elizabeth A Hadly
- Born: 1958
- Spouse: Anthony Barnosky
- Awards: Howard Hughes Medical Institute Professor Award
- Scientific career
- Institutions: Stanford University UCMP (University of California Museum of Paleontology) Montana State University Yellowstone National Park

Elizabeth Hadly (born 1958) is an academic and researcher working in biology, earth/environmental science, and paleoecology. As a professor in the Department of Biology at Stanford University, she holds the Paul S. and Billie Achilles Chair of Environmental Science and is the Head of the Faculty Senate. Her research interests include links between ecology and evolution, and understanding of the impacts of the Anthropocene.

== Early life ==
Growing up in a military family that moved frequently, Hadly found consistency within nature.

Hadly has interest in research within local scale impacts of climate change and emphasizes the importance of local conservation efforts.

== Career ==
Hadly studied anthropology at University of Colorado Boulder. She initially pursued a pre-med track before gaining interest in human history within the fossil record which then evolved to include the environment and climate and how it functioned before humans.

She volunteered in Yellowstone National Park in 1982, which led to a full-time paleoecologist position there. Her work in the park service funded her master's degree in quaternary science at Northern Arizona University in Flagstaff that she received in 1990.

Between 1991 and 1994 she worked towards and was awarded a PhD in integrative biology awarded by the University of California, Berkeley.

From 1995 to 1998, she taught as an assistant research professor at Montana State University.

She was a research associate for UCMP (University of California Museum of Paleontology) from 1995 to 2013 before becoming a professor at Stanford University.

In September 2016, Hadly became faculty director for the Stanford Jasper Ridge Biological Preserve, where she has worked on defining the Anthropocene, the Insect Apocalypse, food webs from feces, soil, and cameras, and reverse spillover - how animals are impacted by human-shed microbes.

Since 2018, she has also been a professor at the Howard Hughes Medical Institute.

Currently teaching at Stanford University, she provides students with field and lab experiences with the belief that hands-on learning enhances problem-solving skills and helps students better understand complex issues. She works to promote diversity through unique locations of study, assisting students from less privileged backgrounds, and interdisciplinary science.

== Research interests ==
Hadly has published over 100 scholarly papers with over 8,000 citations recorded. Her published papers can be found within many databases including the National Library of Medicine database under "Hadley EA [Author]".

Hadly's current research focus is on ecology, evolution, population biology, and genomics.

In collaboration with her husband, Anthony Barnosky, and others, she co-authored a 2012 Nature paper on climatic 'tipping points' and is also co-author, with Barnosky, of Tipping Point for Planet Earth, How Close Are We to the Edge? (2016). She and Barnosky appeared in the 2015 documentary film, Tomorrow.

== Awards and positions ==
In recognition of her contributions to academia and research, Hadley was awarded the Howard Hughes Medical Institute Professor Award, which includes a $1 million grant over five years.

Hadly holds the position of Head of the Faculty Senate at Stanford University.

She is a Senior Fellow of Stanford Woods Institute for the Environment.

Hadly is a member of the Biox Stanford faculty grassroots organization.
