= List of Men in Black: The Series episodes =

The following is a list of episodes of Men in Black: The Series, an American television series that originally aired on Kids' WB. It premiered on October 11, 1997 and ended on June 30, 2001, with a total of 53 episodes over the course of 4 seasons.

== Series overview ==
Season	Episodes	Originally released	
Season	Episodes	First released	Last released
1	13	October 11, 1997	May 16, 1998
2	13	September 19, 1998	February 6, 1999
3	14	October 2, 1999	May 20, 2000
4	13	September 16, 2000	June 30, 2001

== Episodes ==
=== Season 1 (1997–98) ===
No. overall	No. in season	Title	Directed by	Written by	Original release date	Prod. code
1	1	"The Long Goodbye Syndrome"	Frank Paur	Duane Capizzi	October 11, 1997	01
J makes himself a target of the Skraaldians when during a mission to stop one of their kind multiplying in the sewers, he accidentally destroys it rather than freeze it when it attacks K. Learning he is not safe because they can disguise themselves easily, have a hive mentality, and can lock onto his DNA, K is forced to find a solution to save his partner, before J is put into the "soup".
2	2	"The Buzzard Syndrome"	Nathan Chew	Steve Roberts	October 18, 1997	02
A crash landing in the woods leads to K and J encountering Treblor, an alien cop seeking a fugitive named Z-Ron, the downed ship's occupant. But nothing is what it seems for the two MIB agents, when they discover certain facts about their two new arrivals.
3	3	"The Irritable Bow-Wow Syndrome"	Frank Paur	Mark Amato	October 25, 1997	03
When a Charnock lands on Earth and aggressively attempts to take a Void Density Core from Jeebs's shop, K and J quickly discover that Frank had been there and accidentally swallowed it. Now the pair find themselves seeking to protect him, whilst trying to get it out and deactivate it before it can start sucking everything into itself, including New York City.
4	4	"The Alpha Syndrome"	Michael Goguen	Alexx Van Dyne	November 1, 1997	04
K discovers that the theft of a Sintillian heart was the work of Alpha, his former mentor and MIB agent, who stole a Cosmic Integrator to make himself stronger. While K is eager to go it alone, J refuse to let his partner do so, and so is in a race against time to find out where he and Alpha are.
5	5	"The Undercover Syndrome"	Dennis Woodyard	Steve Roberts	November 8, 1997	05
When Dirndl, a Tarkan Trade Minister from Tarka, arrives on Earth for an alien conference, J accidentally incapacitates his Tarkan bodyguard. Z quickly assign him to work undercover as his replacement during the conference, in order to route out an assassin seeking to eliminate him, but with so many aliens attending, it's a tall order for the MIB agent.
6	6	"The Neuralyzer Syndrome"	Dennis Woodyard	Mark Amato	November 15, 1997	06
J has always wanted to know more about K, and gets more than he bargained for when he accidentally neuralyzes him back to when K was sixteen years old. While J finds himself trying to get K to return to MIB HQ, matters are complicated when a group of Chop-Shoppers, black market starship thieves, kidnap him, leading J to call for help from L. Note: This episode was taken off the television airwaves after 2001 due to a scene that resembled the events of 9/11.
7	7	"The Symbiote Syndrome"	Nathan Chew	Alexx Van Dyne	November 22, 1997	07
J offers to replace K for an assignment, when a microbe alien species, the Millicrons, unintentionally infect his partner. His assignment turns out to the safe transportation of a teenage symbiote named Troy, who needs to be brought back to New York City within twenty hours before he adsorbs J, but matters are complicated when Buzzard is hired by a mysterious employer to grab the symbiote.
8	8	"The Inanimate Syndrome"	Michael Goguen	Greg Klein & Thomas Pugsley	December 6, 1997	08
MIB finds themselves dealing with an alien called an Inanimate - a shapeshifter capable of disguising itself as inanimate objects. To assist the organisation, an intergalactic cop named Eileen arrives, and is soon partnered with K, leaving J jealous and eager to keep a close eye on him, despite being partnered with U.
9	9	"The Psychic Link Syndrome"	Nathan Chew	Steve Roberts	December 13, 1997	09
After a human is drained of their bodily fluids, K and J discover it to be the work of an Alcidian named Forbus. They quickly discover that he is both mentally unstable and targeting anyone who films or photographs him, but matters are complicated when Forbus creates a mental link with K that causes him to experience anything the Alcidian does, and is slowly making him as unbalanced as he is.
10	10	"The Head Trip Syndrome"	Michael Goguen	Greg Klein & Thomas Pugsley	December 20, 1997	12
J suddenly becomes the smartest man on the planet when he mistakes a Cerebro-Accelerator for a pair of head phones. But the new intelligence comes at a price - in twenty-two hours, his brain will explode. Matters are not helped when an alien-hating bigot uses a time travel device to begin erasing the five founders of MIB from existence, leaving J the only person to stop him.
11	11	"The Elle of My Dreams Syndrome"	Frank Paur	Greg Weisman	January 10, 1998	10
Investigations into the sudden coma states of the crew of a returning NASA space shuttle leads to K, J and L uncovering it as the work of the Vermax, an alien species that feeds on the chemicals formed from dreams. When bringing down more Vermax at the shuttle's landing site, J prevents L being the latest target of one and is soon put into a deep sleep. To save him by getting him to wake up, L risks her life with restricted technology in order to enter his dreams, despite the Vermax doing everything to stop her.
12	12	"The I Married an Alien Syndrome"	Dennis Woodyard	Steve Roberts	February 14, 1998	13
MIB finds itself attempting to stop an alien race known as the Blastula from increasing Earth's temperature as part of a plot to colonize the planet, but J has suspicions that his partner K is acting odd, and that he might be working for them.
13	13	"The Take No Prisoners Syndrome"	Dennis Woodyard	Dean Stefan	May 16, 1998	11
A break-out in MIB's prison ward incapacitates most of the building and leaves Z and K as prisoners of the mastermind - Dr. Lupo. Because J and the Worms were sealed in a vault getting coffee and thus not put out of action, they become the only ones capable of rescuing Z and K and stopping the breakout of Lupo and two equally dangerous criminal inmates who caused the Prison riot.

=== Season 2 (1998–99) ===
No. overall	No. in season	Title	Directed by	Written by	Original release date	Prod. code
14	1	"The Little Big Man Syndrome"	Nathan Chew	Greg Klein & Thomas Pugsley	September 19, 1998	1
A spate of human suit thefts and the abduction of their owners, the Arquillians, is uncovered to be the work of their enemies, the Fmeks. To learn what they are planning, MIB shrinks J to their size and tasks him and K to investigate. It soon becomes clear that the thefts are part of a much bigger plan.
15	2	"The Quick Clone Syndrome"	Mike Goguen	Duane Capizzi	September 26, 1998	2
Working long hours finally becomes too much for J, so when he discovers that L is using a quick clone to help her get rest, he quickly jumps at the chance of doing the same. But matters become complicated when Alpha uses the remains of one of his quick clones to create a J-lookalike, in order to kidnap Z's brain for information he needs.
16	3	"The Heads You Lose Syndrome"	Chris Dozois	Alexx Van Dyne	October 3, 1998	3
With his alien attachments slowly falling apart, Alpha coerces Jeebs to steal new parts. That is, until he learns that Troy the symbiote is at MIB on an internship, and decides to go after him. K, L and J soon find themselves attempting to stop this, with the help of Troy's mother.
17	4	"The Dog Eat Dog Syndrome"	Nathan Chew	Steve Roberts	October 10, 1998	4
Frank's former cellmate, Drekk, an alien who can generate flames and intense heat from his hands, has escaped and is on the loose on Earth. MIB quickly finds itself trying to locate and capture him through Frank, but when Drekk escapes, he forces Frank to lead K and J into a trap.
18	5	"The Big Bad Bug Syndrome"	Christopher Dozois	Greg Weisman	October 24, 1998	5
MIB learns that a bounty has been placed on L by the Queen of the Bugs, for her part in Edgar's demise. With several bugs, including Edgar's own brother Edwin, arriving on Earth to claim it, and L out in the field, K and J find themselves racing to find and protect her before one the bugs carts her off the planet. Meanwhile J gets roped into the worms scheme of showing their Emperor that they're big shot MIB agents.
19	6	"The Jack O'Lantern Syndrome"	Michael Goguen	Robin Jill Burger	October 31, 1998	6
J finds himself escorting the Worms as they head out trick-or-treating on Halloween night, only to discover, along with K and U, that there's an alien who just arrived, who seeks to kidnap children for slavery. Meanwhile, MIB's Headquarters suddenly experiences a power cut and weird things slowly begin happening, leading to Z and L trying to find a scientific reason for the situation.
20	7	"The Sonic Boom Syndrome"	Nathan Chew	Steve Roberts	November 7, 1998	7
Eileen returns to Earth, refuelling her ship alongside her new partner, Eidi, while they are transporting a sonic-powered alien fugitive named Aldoosi. But when he escapes, MIB coordinates a joint operation to capture him before he can leave the planet. While K is partnered with Eileen, J finds himself working Eidi and discovers that the two are quite similar.
21	8	"The Bad Seed Syndrome"	Christopher Dozois	Alexx Van Dyne	November 14, 1998	8
Contraband goods that recently arrived turn out to be an alien parasitic species that spreads through the use of seeder plants and spores. With much of MIB incapacitated and the world threatened, K and L find themselves seeking the species' nucleus in order to inject it with an antibody, though the matter is not helped by J, who is accidentally given a truth serum and cannot keep quiet.
22	9	"The Fmall, Fmall World Syndrome"	Michael Goguen	Duane Capizzi	November 21, 1998	9
Seeking revenge for the loss of their world, the Fmeks attempt to get a growth formula by capturing the alien scientist that created it while they are at MIB. A group of Fmeks assigned to this task mistakenly believe one of the Worms is their target and capture them. When one of the group is left behind and discovers their error, L finds herself a prisoner upon walking in on him after he use the growth serum on himself.
23	10	"The Black Christmas Syndrome"	Michael Goguen	Duane Capizzi	December 12, 1998	10
Christmas is on hold at MIB as K and J find themselves on the hunt for Santa Claus, soon after Drekk and a group of alien yetis kidnap him from his workshop and steal all of the toys his "elves" were working on. Aided by an elf named Mickey, the pair soon discover that Drekk's employers are not what were expected.
24	11	"The Supermen in Black Syndrome"	Nathan Chew	Steve Roberts	January 16, 1999	11
An alien ship in Earth's orbit is breached by three alien criminal seeking to steal a Tomassitron Matter Amplifier. Although the device is activated in the attempted theft, MIB prevents it being stolen by bringing the ship to Earth. While K, J and L deactivate the Amplifier, all three discover that they have gained super powers from the device's rays, and quickly find themselves the only ones who can stop the criminals when they also develop powers of their own.
25	12	"The Star System Syndrome"	Christopher Dozois	Greg Weisman	January 23, 1999	12
A spate of alien actor abductions in Hollywood leads to K and J meeting with MIB's "Agency" division in Los Angeles to uncover the culprit behind the crime. While J believes the suspect is a former alien actor, K reviews the films of the missing actors to uncover the truth behind their disappearances.
26	13	"The Blackguard Syndrome"	Nathan Chew	Jon Weisman and Greg Weisman	February 6, 1999	13
Alpha returns, and with the aid of Jeebs' brother Dax takes control of MIB's new Blackguard satellite weapon system, which can destroy incoming asteroids or specific targets on Earth. When MIB learns that L thwarted their initial attempt to destroy the organization, and that Jeebs has been contacted for a replacement part to repair the weapon system, K and J are assigned to head out into outer space and stop Alpha before he can get another chance to fire the weapon.

=== Season 3 (1999–2000) ===
No. overall	No. in season	Title	Directed by	Written by	Original release date	Prod. code
27	1	"The Worm-Guy Guy Syndrome"	Jane Wu Soriano	Duane Capizzi	October 2, 1999	302
Two Kalifadik law enforcement officials begin punishing the guilty on Earth, using teleportation guns to send them to an alien prison. As MIB tries to stop them, J and one of the Worms pass through each in mid-teleportation and slowly turn into each other.
28	2	"The Cold Sweat Syndrome"	Bryan Andrews	Steve Melching	October 9, 1999	303
Merged, Alpha and Dak find themselves in Antarctica where a powerful alien spaceship lies buried. It is up to K, J, Jeebs and the Worms to stop them from using it.
29	3	"The Puppy Love Syndrome"	Christopher Berkeley	Tom Pugsley & Greg Klein	October 23, 1999	301
Frank the Pug meets an alien named Veronica and falls in love. But what he does not know is that Veronica works for Javkor, who is out to steal MIB's most powerful weapons.
30	4	"The Lost Continent Syndrome"	Christopher Berkeley	Dean Stefan	November 6, 1999	307
K and J team up with the ocean patrolling MIB operative Agent C when alien terrorist Quintoon's plans to raise the legendary Atlantis continent. However K and J quickly learn that the isolation has made C go mad.
31	5	"The Way Out West Syndrome"	Nathan Chew	Tony Schilacci	November 13, 1999	305
When MIB fails to stop a Metaphite that threatens Phoenix, J and K have to travel back in time to the Wild West to find the Metaphite's then vulnerable cocoon. Unfortunately, a Vexron living in that time is determined to make sure that they do not succeed.
32	6	"The Mine, Mine, Mine Syndrome"	Darwyn Cooke	Tony Reitano	November 20, 1999	306
The Bug Queen herself has come to Earth and is hiding in a hotel, waiting for her eggs to hatch and take over. Making things more difficult for MIB is the presence of the Emperor Worm, who happens to be staying in the exact same hotel as the Bugs.
33	7	"The Bye-Bye Worm Syndrome"	Vincenzo Trippetti	Alexx Van Dyne	December 4, 1999	310
When Zed orders the Worms to be sent back to their home planet after another mishap almost causes a nuclear meltdown, J gets roped into helping prove their innocence. Which he's going to have to, when the real culprit has big plans for Earth.
34	8	"The Lights Out Syndrome"	Bryan Andrews	Nick DuBois	January 15, 2000	304
K is blinded by a Darkon ray and will need J's help to stop the Darkons from creating a permanent eclipse.
35	9	"The Out to Pasture Syndrome"	Darwyn Cooke	Dean Stefan	January 22, 2000	308
Zed surprises everyone when he decides it is time to retire. J gets partnered with L since K is chosen to be the new head of MIB. As Z is neuralyzed and embarks on a life of fishing in Long Island, Alpha returns more powerful than ever.
36	10	"The Sardines and Ice Cream Syndrome"	Christopher Berkeley	Tony Sommo	February 5, 2000	309
J accidentally swallows an alien egg and becomes pregnant. Meanwhile, the Fmeks are shrinking everything in sight.
37	11	"The I Want My Mummy Syndrome"	Bryan Andrews	Steve Melching	March 4, 2000	312
K and J have to contend with a recently awakened Hyperian, which is dressed like an ancient Egyptian mummy. Now the MIB have to stop it from getting off world or risk an invasion.
38	12	"The Baby Kay Syndrome"	Vincenzo Trippetti	Barry Hawkins	March 25, 2000	313
The Stellairian leader comes to Earth for peace talks and K and J have to watch over his daughter, Kima. When she is kidnapped by Frostifarians, her age regressing hypo-spray breaks loose. Now as Kima grows older, K begins turning into a baby.
39	13	"The Bad Doggie Syndrome"	Darwyn Cooke	Marsha Griffin	April 8, 2000	311
K and J are moving fast to stop the take over of Earth by the Tunstons, whose king is hiding out in Frank the Pug's body.
40	14	"The "J" is for James Syndrome"	Jane Wu Soriano	Dean Stefan	May 20, 2000	314
After J goes for a joyride using the LTD, he ends up getting terminated from the MIB. He is then neuralyzed and sent back to the NYPD. However, the MIB need him back when they discover not only has the Bug Queen resurfaced, but J found out their base of operations while out for a spin.

=== Season 4 (2000–01) ===
No. overall	No. in season	Title	Directed by	Written by	Original release date	Prod. code
41	1	"The Musical Chairs Syndrome"	Curt Walstead	Dean Stefan	September 16, 2000	405
Changes abound at MIB as Zed is forced to hire an alien field operative, the overzealous Agent X, who gets partnered with Elle, while the eccentric Dr. Zeeltor takes over her lab duties. As these new changes set in, MIB has to stop New York from being devoured by a Barooga.
42	2	"The Spectacle Syndrome"	Chuck Drost	Marsha Griffin	September 23, 2000	403
K and J have to rescue the Worms from an alien world similar to Ancient Rome.
43	3	"The Back to School Syndrome"	Michael Goguen	Len Uhley	September 30, 2000	404
J poses as a high school student to protect an alien prince from alien terrorists.
44	4	"The Opening Gambit Syndrome"	Chris Dozois	Steven Melching	October 7, 2000	406
Thirty years ago, Alpha stopped an alien from stealing oil on Earth, leaving no clues to why. Now history repeats itself when the mystery alien returns, and Alpha locked down all files on this alien.
45	5	"The Future's So Bright Syndrome"	Chris Dozois	Tom Pugsley & Greg Klein	October 21, 2000	401
During pursuit of a large criminal Worm, Jay gets sent to the future and finds that the Worms rule all of Earth.
46	6	"The Loose Ball Foul Syndrome"	Chris Berkeley	Alexx Van Dyne	April 14, 2001	407
The Fmeks are back and trying to take over a tiny planet that resembles a baseball, one which needs to be next to a planet to keep both of their planets' temperature in balance, so Kay shrinks down to keep things cool. However, Jay, having been petrified earlier, mistakes it for a baseball, and loses it while playing ball with the worms.
47	7	"The Hots for Jay Syndrome"	Chuck Drost	Muchael Edens	April 21, 2001	410
After eating some alien food, Jay gains the ability to throw fire, which will cause him to explode if he overuses it. But Jay's new power is the only thing that can save the day when an alien race called the Huntak infect MIB with an organic virus and take control of headquarters.
48	8	"The Circus Parade Syndrome"	Curt Walstead	Julia Lewald	April 28, 2001	409
A member of a witness protection program for aliens is on the run from an intergalactic gang called The Association when they discover he is on Earth. J's lead on The Association leads him to an alien circus, which brings back terrible memories of a clown that terrified him when he was a child.
49	9	"The Virtual Crossfire Syndrome"	Chuck Drost	Dean Stefan	May 5, 2001	408
J gets a low score on MIB's new virtual reality training test and the embarrassment eventually forces him to try again. But this time the game goes haywire and the dangers J faces become deadly.
50	10	"The Breaking News Syndrome"	Curt Walstead	Marsha Griffin	May 12, 2001	411
An alien TV crew comes to Earth to film MIB agents on the job, just as Drekk returns to cause trouble.
51	11	"The Zero to Superhero Syndrome"	Curt Walstead	Baz Hawkins	May 26, 2001	402
A super-hero calling himself Cosmosis emerges to defend the city from evil, but he is really an alien looking to put his powers to good use. However, MIB feels his new profession could attract trouble for Earth, so they try to lure him out using J as bait and is turned into a human/ Swiss Army Knife hybrid. Which would work, if a hero hating alien didn't show up at the same time.
52	12	"The Endgame Syndrome: Part 1"	Chris Berkeley	Dean Stefan	June 23, 2001	412
Alpha, Vangus and the Ixions return to Earth, working together to threaten all life on the planet. With invasion imminent, Zed decides to reveal MIB's existence to the world.
53	13	"The Endgame Syndrome: Part 2"	Chuck Drost	Dean Stefan	June 30, 2001	413
With MIB having success in coordinating resistance against the invasion, the Ixions plan to unleash a weapon that will kill everyone on Earth. K and J will fight Alpha and Vangus in the final battle for humanity.
