= Endgame (1999 film) =

- Directed by: Luis Cámara
- Written by: Luis Cámara
- Produced by: Nick Papadakis
- Music by: Mark Carroll
- Release date: 1 December 1999
- Running time: 8 minutes
- Country: United States
- Language: English

Endgame is a 1999 short movie about chess between a man and a woman.

== Cast ==
- Gabrielle Galanter as Natalie
- Ian Abercrombie as The Narrator (voice)
- Robert Gaylor as Gregory
- Micaela Moreno as Child
- Arturo Castillo as Photographer
- Antoinette Abbamonte as Chess fan
- Sharon Newman as Chess fan
- B.J. Shepherd as Chess fan
- Izzy as Lizard
