= Anthony David Barnosky =

American academic

- Born: 5 July 1952 (age 74)
- Education: Colorado College; University of Washington
- Scientific career
- Fields: Biology
- Workplaces: University of California, Berkeley

Anthony David Barnosky is an ecologist, geologist and biologist (paleoecology). He was Professor at the Department of Integrative Biology at UC Berkeley until his retirement. His research is concerned with the relationship between climate change and mass extinctions.

== Life ==
Barnosky graduated in 1974 with a bachelor's degree in geology from Colorado College. This was followed by a master's degree (1980) and a Ph.D. (1983) in Earth Sciences at the University of Washington. He is married to Elizabeth A. Hadly, who works in the same field.

== Work ==
His work on tipping elements in the Earth System has led Barnosky to work for clearer efforts in climate policy to make possible the two-degree target for increase in average temperature rise. Barnosky stresses that climate change is a major cause of displacement and the cause of the current mass extinction.

A key concern is the concept of "tipping point"

Localized ecological systems are known to shift abruptly and irreversibly from one state to another when they are forced across critical thresholds. Here we review evidence that the global ecosystem as a whole can react in the same way and is approaching a planetary-scale critical transition as a result of human influence. The plausibility of a planetary-scale 'tipping point' highlights the need to improve biological forecasting by detecting early warning signs of critical transitions on global as well as local scales, and by detecting feedbacks that promote such transitions. It is also necessary to address root causes of how humans are forcing biological changes.

== See also ==
- Tipping points in the climate system

== Selected publications ==
- Anthony D. Barnosky: Heatstroke: Nature in an Age of Global Warming. 2009, ISBN 9781597261975
- Anthony D. Barnosky: Dodging Extinction Power, Food, Money, and the Future of Life on Earth. 2014, ISBN 9780520274372
- Anthony D. Barnosky, Elizabeth A. Hadly : Tipping Point for Planet Earth: How Close Are We to the Edge? 2016, ISBN 9781250051158
- Steffen, Will; Rockström, Johan; Richardson, Katherine; Lenton, Timothy M.; Folke, Carl; Liverman, Diana; Summerhayes, Colin P.; Barnosky, Anthony D.; Cornell, Sarah E.; Crucifix, Michel; Donges, Jonathan F.; Fetzer, Ingo; Lade, Steven J.; Scheffer, Marten; Winkelmann, Ricarda; Schellnhuber, Hans Joachim (2018). "Trajectories of the Earth System in the Anthropocene". Proceedings of the National Academy of Sciences. 115 (33): 8252–8259. Bibcode:2018PNAS..115.8252S. doi:10.1073/pnas.1810141115. ISSN 0027-8424. PMC 6099852. PMID 30082409. pdf
- Villavicencio, Natalia A.; Lindsey, Emily L.; Martin, Fabiana M.; Borrero, Luis A.; Moreno, Patricio I.; Marshall, Charles R.; Barnosky, Anthony D. (2016). "Combination of humans, climate, and vegetation change triggered Late Quaternary megafauna extinction in the Última Esperanza region, southern Patagonia, Chile". Ecography. 39 (2): 125–140. doi:10.1111/ecog.01606. ISSN 0906-7590. pdf
- Barnosky, Anthony D.; Hadly, Elizabeth A.; Bascompte, Jordi; Berlow, Eric L.; Brown, James H.; Fortelius, Mikael; Getz, Wayne M.; Harte, John; Hastings, Alan; Marquet, Pablo A.; Martinez, Neo D.; Mooers, Arne; Roopnarine, Peter; Vermeij, Geerat; Williams, John W.; Gillespie, Rosemary; Kitzes, Justin; Marshall, Charles; Matzke, Nicholas; Mindell, David P.; Revilla, Eloy; Smith, Adam B. (2012). "Approaching a state shift in Earth's biosphere". Nature. 486 (7401): 52–58. Bibcode:2012Natur.486...52B. doi:10.1038/nature11018. hdl:10261/55208. ISSN 0028-0836. PMID 22678279. S2CID 4788164.
