= Once More, with Feeling (Blood of the Martyrs album) =

Studio album by Blood of the Martyrs
- Released: March 22, 2011
- Recorded: Late 2010–early 2011
- Studio: Pendlewood Studios, Columbus, Ohio
- Genre: Deathcore; symphonic metal; Christian metal
- Length: 31:55
- Label: Dark Slate
- Producer: Blood of the Martyrs

Blood of the Martyrs chronology
| Pendlewood Studios (2010) | Once More, with Feeling (2011) | Completionist (2013) |

Professional ratings
Review scores
| Source | Rating |
|---|---|
| Spirit of Metal | 17/20 |
| Thrash Magazine | 3.5/5 stars |

Once More, with Feeling is the debut album by American metalcore band Blood of the Martyrs. The album was released on March 22, 2011 through Dark Slate Records and was self-produced.

== Background and release ==
This is the only studio album to feature guitarists Hayden Caldwell and Brian Paulette and also the only LP with Bobby Huotari on drums, as he switched to bass shortly before the production of Completionist.

The band recorded a 3-track demo in late-2009 and released it on January 1, 2010. The band was signed to Dark Slate Records after the demo's release and started work on their debut. Guitarist Hayden Caldwell was released from the band shortly after this release and was replaced with Christopher Oberholtzer.

Once More, with Feeling was released March 22, 2011 through Dark Slate Records and featured re-recorded versions of "Ahh...Real Monsters!!!" and "I Know Why the Caged Bird Kills". The album received positive reviews, but unfortunately received little attention from mainstream audiences. After releasing a cover of Thirty Seconds to Mars' The Kill, the band and album started to receive more attention. The cover was released via YouTube and free download on November 23, 2011.

A new version of "Lady Nightshade" was released as a single for free download on August 15, 2014 and featured then-touring vocalist Eric Hendricks.

== Reception ==
The album received mostly positive reviews upon its release. Thrash Magazine gave the album 3.5/5 stars. The reviewer praised the band's ability to merge humorous elements with the religious ones. The album garnered some mixed reviews from Sputnikmusic and overall positive reviews from numerous other online blogs/websites.

== Track listing ==
All lyrics are written by Bobby Huotari; all music is composed by Lee Zook, Brian Paulette, Ronald Swinson, and Bobby Huotari.

| No. | Title | Length |
|---|---|---|
| 1. | "Showdown at Cremation Creek" (Instrumental) | 1:50 |
| 2. | "Vietnamese "Two Step" Viper" | 3:27 |
| 3. | "AHH... REAL MONSTERS!!!" | 3:29 |
| 4. | "12 Counts of Sass in the First Degree" | 3:18 |
| 5. | "Now Museum, Now You Don't" | 3:05 |
| 6. | "Escape to the House of Mummies Pt. II" | 3:21 |
| 7. | "Zookreeper" | 3:14 |
| 8. | "Lady Nightshade" | 3:42 |
| 9. | "I Know Why the Caged Bird Kills" | 3:41 |
| 10. | "The Guild of Calamitous Intent" (Instrumental) | 2:48 |
| Total length: | | 31:55 |

== Personnel ==
- Lee Zook – vocals, keyboards
- Bobby Huotari – drums
- Brian Paulette – guitar
- Ronald Swinson – guitar
- Travis Lilley – bass
