= Thomas McInerney =

Retired United States Air Force general

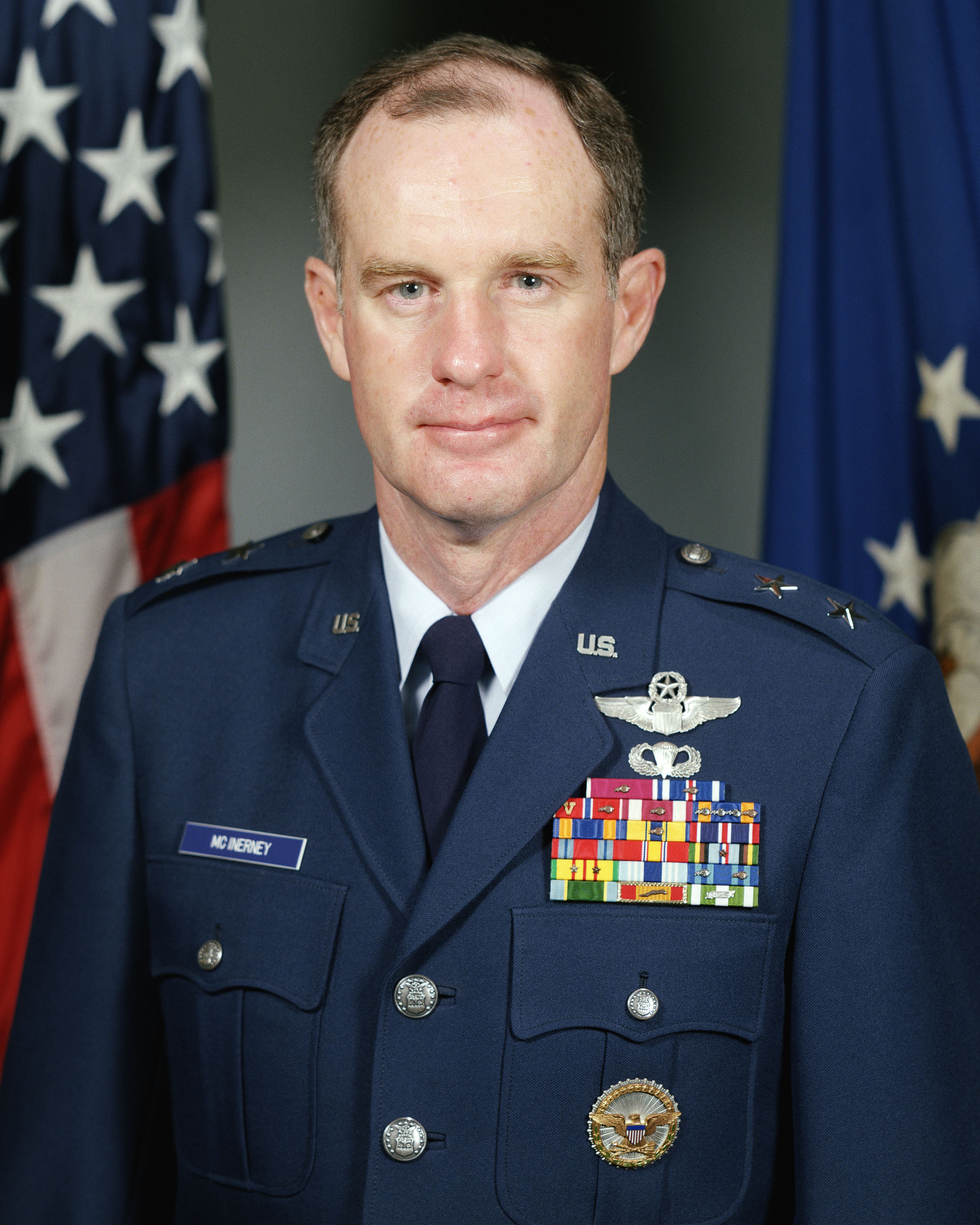
- Official portrait, 1983
- Born: Thomas Gillis McInerney; March 7, 1937 (age 89); Havre de Grace, Maryland, U.S.
- Relatives: James E. McInerney Jr. (brother)
- Military career
- Allegiance: United States of America
- Branch: United States Army; United States Air Force
- Service years: 1959–1994
- Rank: Lieutenant General
- Commands: 3rd Tactical Fighter Wing; 313th Air Division; Third Air Force; Alaskan Air Command; Eleventh Air Force
- Conflicts: Vietnam War
- Awards: Distinguished Service Medal (2); Defense Superior Service Medal; Legion of Merit (2); Distinguished Flying Cross (2); Bronze Star (2) with "V" device Meritorious Service Medal (2); Air Medal (17); Air Force Commendation Medal (2)

Thomas McInerney (born March 7, 1937) is a political commentator and a retired United States Air Force Lieutenant General.

McInerney was a forward air controller and fighter pilot during the Vietnam War and flew 407 combat missions during his four tours of duty. In addition to his Vietnam service, McInerney served overseas in NATO; Pacific Air Forces and as commander of Eleventh Air Force in Alaska.

Since his retirement in 1994, McInerney has been on the boards of several military contractors. He was a frequent guest on Fox News until 2018 when he claimed without evidence that John McCain, whom he called "Songbird John", betrayed his country when he was a prisoner of war in Vietnam. He was a staunch advocate of the Iraq War, defended the use of torture, and defended the George W. Bush administration.

== Education ==
McInerney was born March 7, 1937, in Havre de Grace, Maryland, and graduated from Garden City (N.Y.) High School in 1955. He earned a BS degree from the United States Military Academy in 1959 and a master's degree in international relations from George Washington University in 1972. McInerney graduated from the Armed Forces Staff College in 1970 and from the National War College in 1973.

== Military career ==
After graduating from USMA in June 1959, McInerney was commissioned as a second lieutenant in the United States Army. He then joined the Air Force, and completed initial pilot training at Bartow Air Base, Florida, and Laredo Air Force Base, Texas, in November 1960. He participated in the Berlin and Cuban crises in 1962, flying escort missions in the West Berlin Air Corridor and escort reconnaissance missions over Cuba during the Cuban Missile Crisis. In April 1963, he was one of the first forward air controllers assigned to South Vietnam with a Vietnamese army division. He participated in three additional Southeast Asia deployments.

On 11 March 1967 his younger brother Richard (USMA 1960) was killed in action while commanding D Company, 2nd Battalion, 5th Cavalry Regiment in South Vietnam. Theirs is the third of eleven families to have four children graduate from West Point since its establishment in 1802, to include brothers James Jr (1952) and John (1959).

After completing the Armed Forces Staff College in February 1970, he was transferred to the Directorate of Operational Requirements, Air Force headquarters. Upon graduation from National War College in July 1973, McInerney was assigned to the 58th Tactical Fighter Training Wing, Luke Air Force Base, as F-104 and F-5 director of operations. In August 1974, he became the air attaché to the U.S. Embassy in London. From November 1976 until October 1977, he was vice commander of the 20th Tactical Fighter Wing, Royal Air Force Station Upper Heyford, England. McInerney then became military assistant to Ambassador Robert W. Komer. In March 1979, McInerney became commander of the 3d Tactical Fighter Wing, Clark Air Base, Philippines.

In February 1981, he became commander of the 313th Air Division, Kadena Air Base, Japan. McInerney then was deputy chief of staff for operations and intelligence, Headquarters Pacific Air Forces, Hickam Air Force Base, Hawaii, from June 1983 to July 1985, when he became commander of Third Air Force, Royal Air Force Station Mildenhall, England. In October 1986, McInerney was assigned as vice commander in chief, Headquarters U.S. Air Forces in Europe, Ramstein Air Base, West Germany. He became commander of Alaskan Air Command, Alaskan NORAD Region, and Joint Task Force Alaska in May 1988. McInerney assumed command of Alaskan Command upon its activation in July 1989 and became commander of Eleventh Air Force when Alaskan Air Command was redesignated Eleventh Air Force in August 1990.

McInerney's last active duty assignment was as assistant vice chief of staff, Headquarters U.S. Air Force, Washington, D.C. He retired from the Air Force on 1 July 1994.

McInerney's military awards and decorations include the following:

- Distinguished Service Medal with 1 oak leaf cluster
- Defense Superior Service Medal
- Legion of Merit with 1 oak leaf cluster
- Distinguished Flying Cross with 1 oak leaf cluster
- Bronze Star Medal with 1 oak leaf cluster and "V" device
- Meritorious Service Medal with 1 oak leaf cluster
- Air Medal with 17 oak leaf clusters
- Air Force Commendation Medal with 1 oak leaf cluster
- National Defense Service Medal
- Vietnam Service Medal with 1 silver star and 1 bronze star
- Republic of Vietnam Gallantry Cross Unit Citation with palm
- Republic of Vietnam Campaign Medal with 1960- device

McInerney has also been awarded the Third Order of the Rising Sun by the Japanese government. McInerney was inducted into the USAF Order of the Sword in July 1980.

== Post military career ==
Beginning in January 2002, McInerney was a military analyst on Fox News until May 2018.

McInerney was a staunch advocate for the Iraq War. In 2002, he incorrectly predicted that a military campaign against Iraq would be "shorter" than the 42 days it took to complete the Persian Gulf War in 1991, and further, "It is going to be absolutely awesome, and that's why this war, if we do it properly, will go very quick, and we'll have less civilian casualties than we did last time."

In 2004, he claimed without evidence that with the aid of a Russian Special Forces team with GRU, Saddam had transported weapons of mass destruction (WMDs) to Syria and the Bekaa Valley in Lebanon for safekeeping. Although McInerney said they had been moved to three places in Syria and one in Lebanon, the final report of the Iraq Survey Group, by Charles A. Duelfer, special adviser on Iraqi weapons to the C.I.A., concluded that any stockpiles had been destroyed long before the war and that transfers to Syria were "unlikely."

In 2006, McInerney advocated for regime change via military action against Iran and North Korea.

McInerney has been a member of the Boards of Directors of military contractors, including Alloy Surfaces Company, Kilgore Flares Co, Nortel Government Solutions Inc. Pan American International Academy (Flight Simulators), Agusta Westland NA, and Crescent Partnerships.

In 2008, it was revealed that McInerney received email communications from the Pentagon with talking points that he should use to defend the Bush administration in his TV appearances and columns.

In 2010, McInerney provided his support against the court martial of fellow birther Terrence Lakin, who refused to deploy to Afghanistan due to his suspicion of President Barack Obama's birthplace.

On September 6, 2016, McInerney was one of 88 retired military leaders who endorsed the Republican presidential nominee, Donald Trump.

On September 15, 2020, McInerney was one of 235 retired military leaders who endorsed Trump's re-election for president.

=== Views ===
McInerney has called Obama a treasonous leader who is "aiding and abetting the enemy." McInerney also has said there were "widespread and legitimate concerns that the President [Obama] is constitutionally ineligible to hold office."

In 2010, In the wake of the 2009 Christmas Day bombing attempt on a flight from Amsterdam to Detroit, he called for strip-searching all Muslim men between the ages of 18 and 28 at airports.

In 2015, as a Fox News contributor and a member of the Iran Policy Committee, McInerney was noted for suggesting on Fox News that terrorists could have flown the disappeared Malaysia Airlines 370 to Pakistan.

In May 2018, McInerney appeared on Fox Business News and asserted to the show's host Charles Payne, that torture had "worked on" John McCain (when he was a POW in North Vietnam) and "That's why they call him 'Songbird John'," referencing an unverified claim made against McCain during the Republican primary in South Carolina in 2000. After the show, Payne apologized on Twitter to McCain and his family for what McInerney had said which he himself did not hear or challenge because he was being told at the same time by the control room to "wrap the segment". Afterward, Fox News announced that McInerney would never appear on Fox News or Fox Business again.

On November 28, 2020, McInerney pushed claims about election fraud after the 2020 elections. He claimed that "US special forces command seized a server farm in Frankfurt, Germany", which was run by the Central Intelligence Agency (CIA). Both the U.S. Army and U.S. Army Special Operations Command denied that such an attack occurred. He later called on Trump "to declare a national emergency, use the Insurrection Act, declare martial law, suspend habeas corpus, set up military tribunals, and suspend the electoral college [vote for president and vice-president] on December 14 and the presidential inauguration on January 20". He claimed that the election was being stolen from Trump and treasonous parties should be arrested and charged and a "full investigation" must be done by Trump.

== See also ==
- WMD theories in the aftermath of the 2003 Iraq War
- Attempts to overturn the 2020 United States presidential election
