= Rex Armistead =

- Born: February 23, 1930; Lula, Mississippi, U.S.
- Died: December 24, 2013 (aged 83); Blue Springs, Mississippi, U.S.
- Education: Memphis State University
- Occupations: Deputy sheriff State police officer Private investigator
- Known for: Mississippi State Sovereignty Commission; Arkansas Project
- Political party: Republican
- Spouse: Sarah Dawn Goodwin Armistead (married 1950-2011, her death)

Rex Armistead (February 23, 1930 – December 24, 2013) was a private detective, Mississippi Highway Patrol officer, and the leading operative for the since disbanded Mississippi State Sovereignty Commission. Later, he was heavily involved as an investigator for the Arkansas Project, a co-ordinated attempt in the 1990s to investigate then U.S. President Bill Clinton. The project was funded by conservative media billionaire Richard Mellon Scaife.

== Background ==
Armistead was born in Lula, a rural community in Coahoma County in northern Mississippi, to Roscoe Perry Armistead and the former Eula Mae Perryman. He attended Castle Heights Military Academy in Lebanon, Tennessee, and Memphis State University in Memphis, Tennessee. He served in the United States Army in the Korean War.

He was a member of the Masonic lodge, the Shriners, and the American Legion.

== Career ==
He began his work in law enforcement as a deputy sheriff for Coahoma County. He then was employed for many years as a state highway patrol officer. In the 1960s, as head of the highway patrol, he was sent to work for the Sovereignty Commission, a state body established to develop a legal method of maintaining Mississippi's then racial segregationist laws. He was selected to investigate the "Dixie Mafia" (a term Armistead apparently coined himself) by the then-Governor John Bell Williams, a Democrat. His role was investigative; he had no powers of arrest.

After working undercover, he became chief investigator of the highway patrol, during which time he was present in May 1970 at the Jackson State Killings, when state police opened fire on African-American student protesters at Jackson State College in the Mississippi state capital; two students were killed. He was one of the police witnesses who controversially alleged the presence of a student sniper, providing a pretext for the shooting. This allegation was dismissed by congressional investigation. Armistead then became chief investigator of the state Bureau of Identification, and then director of the criminal investigation section of the Mississippi Department of Safety, before becoming head of the Mississippi state police.

=== Working against the Dixie Mafia ===
In 1976, Armistead became director of the Organized Crime Strike Force in New Orleans, Louisiana. In an interview, he characterized the Dixie mafia as more ruthless than Cosa Nostra: "There wasn't a well from Mississippi to West Texas that didn't have a dead body floating in it. The big difference was the lack of ceremony. It was just 'I'm going to get rid of Ambrose today; I don't need permission; and I go out and do it.' As simple as that. And that's the end of Ambrose. It hasn't changed much either.".

=== Regional Organized Crime Information Center ===
On leaving the police, in the late 1970s, Armistead ran a non-profit crime-fighting organisation called the Regional Organized Crime Information Center in Memphis, which received a $2.3 million-a-year grant from the Law Enforcement Assistance Agency to help local police and prosecutors track the movements of habitual felony offenders across state lines. Former Memphis police director E. Winslow 'Buddy' Chapman has said that he never found evidence of what the center did; Justice Department accounting officials have said records of Armistead's grant proposal and other documents no longer exist. The ACLU raised concerns that the center was spying on private citizens.

=== As a private detective ===
He later became a private detective "specialized in political dirty tricks on behalf of Republican candidates". Most notably he was involved in the smearing in 1983 of Democratic Party gubernatorial candidate Bill Allain, having fostered rumors that Allain had had sexual relations with three transvestites, a plot eventually uncovered by ABC's 20/20 program. Allain went on to win the election anyway by defeating Republican nominee Leon Bramlett. Armistead was hired to investigate (and solve) the organized crime-related murders of Biloxi judge Vince Sherry and his wife (and former city councillor) Margaret.

== Resistance to the civil rights movement ==
Joe Conason notes that Armistead rose to be chief of Mississippi State Police under Governor John Bell Williams, "the last openly racist governor of Mississippi" and that "Armistead rose to power during an era of official terrorism and violent repression against black citizens and civil rights advocates". Former fellow anti-Clintonite David Brock has alleged that Armistead was involved in "white resistance to civil rights". In addition to his involvement in the cover-up in the Jackson state killings, as part of the Sovereignty Commission, Armistead was involved in surveillance of potential threats to the existing segregated order. On one occasion he engineered the removal of a university campus security chief for trying to arrest a white student who had administered a beating to a black student.

== Involvement in the Arkansas Project ==
According to documents recovered from the American Spectator, Armistead was paid at least $353,517 by the Arkansas Project. The Washington Post says that it is not entirely clear what services he provided for that money, although it has been established that Armistead was involved in promoting three key aspersions of the Arkansas Project narrative - that Clinton had been protecting drug smuggling, that Clinton had himself used cocaine, and that Clinton was implicated in the alleged murder of Vince Foster. Armistead provided results from his investigations into Clinton's alleged protection of a cocaine smuggling ring while Clinton was governor of Arkansas to the House Banking Committee. All allegations were judged by federal authorities to be without foundation.

=== Attempts to implicate Clinton in cocaine smuggling and use ===
Armistead was funded by Scaife to investigate rumors of Bill Clinton's involvement in helping cocaine runners in rural Arkansas. The substance of the allegation was that Clinton had turned a blind eye to cocaine smugglers operating out of an airport in Mena, Arkansas, because a wealthy campaign contributor was said to profit from the illicit activity, and also because proceeds from the smuggling were allegedly funding a covert CIA operation. These rumors had originated earlier in the decade with talk radio shows in Arkansas funded by the conservative Citizens for Honest Government organization associated with the Virginia evangelist Jerry Falwell. This organisation had also been involved in payments to witness in the Troopergate affair. Armistead travelled across North and South America purportedly gaining information, which he supplied to the House Banking Committee. Three federal investigations found that these allegations had no basis whatsoever.

Under questioning, Armistead also misled Federal Drug Enforcement Administration officers twice about the source of his funds (which was Scaife), claiming alternately funding from the Republican National Convention (who later denied all contact) and from the House Banking Committee. David Runkel, House Banking Committee spokesman, admitted that they had met with Armistead on a number of occasions, but denied he was a primary source for allegations that they were investigating. Armistead's report also formed the basis for articles in the American Spectator.

Armistead also investigated allegations that Bill Clinton had once used cocaine himself, providing material for R. Emmett Tyrrell, editor of the American Spectator, who published the (unsupported) allegations just before the 1996 presidential election.

=== Vince Foster murder rumors ===
On July 20, 1993, in Fort Marcy Park, Virginia, Vince Foster, a deputy White House Counsel during Clinton's first presidential term, was found with a gunshot to the head, a day after contacting his doctor to get treatment for depression. Several official investigations concluded unequivocally that the death was a suicide. However, as he was a law partner and friend of Hillary Rodham Clinton, it was alleged by a number of anti-Clinton conspiracy theorists that his knowledge of the Clintons' financial affairs (which the Whitewater theorists claimed would reveal their illegal dealings) had led them to have him killed. Former conservative journalist David Brock recalled being summoned to a meeting with Armistead in Miami, at an airport hotel. Armistead laid out an elaborate "Vince Foster murder scenario," Brock said – a scenario that he found "implausible".

=== Spying on John Camp ===
Armistead was also found to have been spying on CNN journalist John Camp, after Camp had reported that the cocaine ring allegations against Clinton were groundless. The results of his efforts, a dossier containing information on Camp's private life and that of two of his family members, were passed to the Senate House banking committee. This was not the first time Armistead had spied on journalists; as part of his work for the Sovereignty Commission he had placed television news commentator Howard K. Smith under surveillance.

=== Connections to the Starr Investigation ===
Salon reporters also discovered that Armistead had met several times with the head of the Starr investigation team in Little Rock, Arkansas, Hickman Ewing; some of these meetings were attended by federal agents, who have confirmed them. Ewing's association with Armistead went back to the 1970s, when they had known each other and worked together when Ewing was a federal prosecutor in Memphis and Armistead headed a nonprofit crime-fighting organization there.

== After the Starr Investigation ==
=== Investigating the death of Steve Kangas ===
When former military intelligence specialist turned progressive writer Steve Kangas committed suicide less than sixty feet from Richard Scaife's office in February 1999, Scaife hired Armistead, along with Richard Gazarik, a reporter from the Pittsburgh Tribune-Review (a newspaper owned by Scaife), to investigate the circumstances of Kangas' death. Kangas had been critical of Scaife on online forums including Kangas' own website Liberal Resurgent. He had accused Scaife of being head of a vast right-wing conspiracy, and of persecuting Bill Clinton, whom Kangas considered to be a moderate Republican. Kangas was found with a pistol and forty-eight rounds of ammunition. Armistead and Gazarik were investigating whether Kangas had been out to kill Scaife. They spoke to his family, reviewed his Internet postings, and checked both his apartment and place of employment. It has subsequently been claimed that Scaife's use of Armistead and Gazarik has fuelled conspiracy theories about Kangas' death.

=== Armistead v. Minor ===
In 2002, Armistead lost a libel case against the Mississippi journalist Bill Minor. In a 1998 regular "Eyes on Mississippi" column, Minor referred to Armistead's "odoriferous background in Mississippi, ranging all the way from head-bashing of black civil rights workers to concocting a bizarre homosexual scandal in an attempt to defeat a gubernatorial candidate." The column was ruled by an 8-0 decision to be "substantially true". This case was heard on appeal because a lower court had ruled that Armistead was "libel-proof, meaning that his reputation was so bad that defamatory statements could not hurt him [any] more", a decision overturned by the appellate judge.

== Death ==
His services, with Mississippi Highway Patrol honors, were held at the Tunica Presbyterian Church in Tunica, Mississippi, at which he was a member.
