= Accuracy in Media =

American conservative news website

- Abbreviation: AIM
- Founder: Reed Irvine
- Type: 501(c)(3) organization
- Tax ID no.: 23-7135837
- Location: 1717 K Street NW Suite 900 Washington, DC 20006
- President: Adam Guillette
- Revenue: $3.19 million (2024)
- Expenses: $3.16 million (2024)
- Staff: 8 (2024)
- Website: www.aim.org

Accuracy in Media (AIM) is an American non-profit conservative news media watchdog founded in 1969 by economist Reed Irvine. AIM supported the Vietnam War and blamed media bias for the U.S. loss in the war. During the Reagan administration, AIM criticized reporting about the El Mozote massacre in El Salvador. During the Clinton administration, AIM pushed Vince Foster conspiracy theories. During the George W. Bush administration, AIM accused the media of bias against the Iraq War, defended the Bush administration's use of torture, and campaigned to stop the United States from signing the United Nations Convention on the Law of the Sea (UNCLOS). It described 2008 presidential candidate Barack Obama as "the most radical candidate ever to stand at the precipice of acquiring his party's presidential nomination" and said it was "apparent that he is a member of an international socialist movement". It also criticized the media's response to the COVID-19 pandemic.

AIM, which opposes the scientific consensus on climate change, has criticized media reporting on climate change. The organization gives out the Reed Irvine Accuracy in Media Award. Past recipients include Marc Morano (who runs the climate change denial website ClimateDepot), Tucker Carlson, and Jim Hoft (founder of The Gateway Pundit).

== History ==
Accuracy in Media (AIM) was founded in 1969 by Reed Irvine, an economist at the Federal Reserve Bank. In order to reduce what they perceive as bias in media reporting, AIM works to "investigate complaints, take proven cases to top media officials, seek corrections and mobilize public pressure to bring about remedial action."

Irvine and then-executive secretary Abraham Kalish sent letters to the editors of many newspapers and magazines they identified as skewed, calling out slanted news stories. If the newspaper rejected the letter, AIM bought space and printed the letter in that newspaper. Beginning in 1975, Accuracy in Media began purchasing participating interests in major media companies, allowing Irvine to attend annual shareholder meetings. He used these opportunities to express the AIM's concerns to the various companies' owners. Reed's son, Don, chairs the organization. Don Irvine referred to his father as a "die-hard anti-communist." In 1990, Irvine was mentioned by Walter Goodman of The New York Times for "his efforts to put pressure on networks and advertisers to crack down on reporters to whom he takes exception do not mark him as an enthusiast of unfettered expression."

Following Irvine's death in 2004, an editorial in the Columbia Journalism Review said that "[Irvine] was stone blind to his own prejudices, and he could be scurrilous and unfair in his attacks, but he knew something about our major media" and credited Irvine in part for the rise of the popular conservative view that the American media is imbued with a liberal bias. According to The Washington Post, while Irvine worked at the Federal Reserve, co-workers he would eat lunch with often "complained that conservative points of view were not adequately reported in the media." In his way of changing this, Irvine formed AIM. It is also said that Reed Irvine was urged to start the organization after the 1968 Democratic National Convention because he thought the mainstream media networks were overly sympathetic to antiwar protestors.

Membership to AIM grew significantly when Reagan was president, topping 40,000 members with a budget of $1.5 million. As the organization grew, Reed Irvine was also a shareholder in media companies. During a shareholder meeting for TBS in 1989, Irvine said at the meeting that conservative leaning organizations had a difficult time getting their views presented on TBS and this was not the case for more liberal leaning groups. As of April 2020, the current president of AIM is Adam Guillette.

=== Funding ===
AIM's income in 1971 was $5,000. By the early 1980s, it was $1.5 million. In 2009, AIM received $500,000 in contributions. At least eight separate oil companies are known to have been contributors in the early 80s. Only three donors are given by name: the Allied Educational Foundation (founded and chaired by George Barasch), Shelby Cullom Davis, and billionaire Richard Mellon Scaife. Scaife gave $2.2 million to Accuracy in Media between 1977 and 1998. AIM has been funded by Exxon.

== Activism ==
=== War coverage ===
AIM was critical of media reports about the harmful effects of Agent Orange, a military herbicide with adverse health effects for humans, in the Vietnam War. AIM blamed the U.S. media for the loss in the Vietnam War. AIM criticized the 1983 PBS documentary series Vietnam: A Television History as being pro-communist. According to The New York Times, one of AIM's greatest accomplishments was the documentary, Television's Vietnam: The Real Story in response to the PBS series.

AIM charged the alliance conducting the NATO Kosovo intervention in 1999 with distorting the situation in Kosovo and lying about the number of civilian deaths in order to justify U.S. involvement in the conflict under the Clinton administration. AIM supported the Iraq War and accused the media of bias against the Iraq War in 2007, and alleged bias in mainstream media's coverage of the 2012 Benghazi attack. In 2008, AIM asserted "Waterboarding Is Not Torture" in a sub-heading. The article said that Guantanamo Bay detainees "are enjoying hotel living conditions" and that torture is what "left-wingers associate with anything that makes an accused terrorist uncomfortable".

=== Human rights ===
In 1982, The New York Times reporter Raymond Bonner broke the story of the El Mozote massacre in El Salvador. The report was strongly criticized by AIM and the Reagan administration, and Bonner was pressured into business reporting, later deciding to resign. AIM was critical of journalist Helen Marmor, who in 1983 produced a documentary for NBC concerning the Russian Orthodox Church. AIM contended that "it ignored the repressive religious policies of the Soviet state."

=== Vince Foster conspiracy theory ===
AIM received a substantial amount of funding from Richard Mellon Scaife who paid Christopher W. Ruddy to investigate allegations that President Bill Clinton was connected to the suicide of Vince Foster. AIM contended that "Foster was murdered", which is contrary to three independent reports including one by Kenneth Starr. AIM faulted the media for not picking up on the conspiracy, and applied itself for Freedom of Information Act (FOIA) disclosure of Foster's death-scene photographs. Its suit to compel disclosure was denied by the District Court of Columbia in a summary judgment, unanimously affirmed by the Court of Appeals for the District of Columbia.

AIM credited much of its reporting on the Foster case to Ruddy. Yet, his work was called a "hoax" and "discredited" by conservatives such as Ann Coulter, it was also disputed by the American Spectator, which caused Scaife to end his funding of the Arkansas Project with the publisher. As CNN explained on February 28, 1997, "The [Starr] report refutes claims by conservative political organizations that Foster was the victim of a murder plot and coverup", but "despite those findings, right-wing political groups have continued to allege that there was more to the death and that the president and First Lady tried to cover it up."

=== United Nations ===
AIM has been critical of the United Nations and its coverage by the media. In February 2005, AIM alleged that United Nations correspondents, including Ian Williams, a correspondent for The Nation had accepted money from the UN while covering it for their publications. AIM also asserted that the United Nations Correspondents Association may have violated immigration laws by employing the Williams' wife. Williams and The Nation denied wrongdoing. AIM has also campaigned against the United States signing the United Nations Convention on the Law of the Sea (UNCLOS). AIM writes, "UNCLOS is a foot in the door for a wide-ranging international agenda... America's survival as a sovereign nation hangs in the balance." AIM argued that signing up to UNCLOS could lead to the prohibition of spanking children.

=== Climate change ===
AIM rejects the scientific consensus on climate change. In 2008, AIM wrote, "the theory of man-made global warming is designed to increase government control over our economy and our lives through higher taxes and energy rationing." In November 2005, AIM columnist Cliff Kincaid criticized Fox News for broadcasting a program The Heat is On, which reported that global warming represents a serious problem (the program was broadcast with a disclaimer). Kincaid argued the piece was one-sided and stated that this "scandal" amounted to a "hostile takeover of Fox News." In 2006, Kincaid criticized Fox for "tilting to the left" on the issue of climate change.

AIM criticized the media for not covering a 1995 study on climate change, which it argued cast doubt on climate change. One of the authors of the study responded to AIM, "The paper... focused on a discrepancy between observations and theoretical climate model predictions—the sort of thing that climate change deniers love to take out of context and hype. The conservative organization Accuracy in Media took note of the study, citing lack of media coverage of it as some sort of evidence of media bias in coverage of climate change—something that I, to this day, find puzzling as the paper actually dealt with a relatively obscure technical detail of climate models and hardly challenged the mainstream view that human activity was leading to the warming of the globe."

=== Barack Obama ===
In 2008, AIM described Barack Obama, who was at the time a candidate in the 2008 presidential election, as "the most radical candidate ever to stand at the precipice of acquiring his party's presidential nomination. It is apparent that he is a member of an international socialist movement." AIM titled one of its reports, "Is Barack Obama a Marxist Mole?" In the lead-up to the 2008 election, AIM wrote, "there is a pattern of people who hate America showing up at critical junctures in Obama's life and career to influence and advise him."

=== COVID-19 pandemic ===
In March 2020, the president of AIM, Adam Guillette, took a stance on the COVID-19 pandemic outbreak, asserting that the media is exaggerating the pandemic.

=== Accuracy in Media Award ===
The organization gives out the Reed Irvine Accuracy in Media Award, which has attracted controversy for some of its recipients. In 2010, AIM gave the Reed Irvine Accuracy in Media Award to political activist Marc Morano, who is known for running the website ClimateDepot, which rejects the scientific consensus on climate change. In 2011, AIM gave the award to Tucker Carlson. In 2013, AIM gave the Reed Irvine Accuracy in Media Award to Jim Hoft, who runs The Gateway Pundit, a website renowned for publishing falsehoods and hoaxes.

=== Hitler truck ===
In 2022, AIM sponsored an ad campaign against antisemitism that used a truck with a digital image of Hitler giving the Nazi salute. The image included the text: "All in favor of banning Jews, raise your right hand." Several rocks were thrown at the truck. The use of the imagery was criticized by the Anti-Defamation League and the UC Berkeley chapter of Hillel International.

=== Antisemitism trucks ===
In October 2023, following the October 7 attacks, AIM initiated a controversial campaign in which they displayed the names and images of college students who had expressed support for Palestine on trucks. This event sparked significant debate and controversy around issues of free speech, privacy, and online harassment. On November 16, 2023, such a "doxxing truck" sponsored by AIM, with a three-sided digital billboard, drove through Yale's campus displaying photos and names of at least 6 Yale students, 5 of which are graduate students of color, under a banner reading "Yale's Leading Antisemites." A website address printed on the side of the truck directed to a page with AIM's logo, which requested people petition Connecticut government officials and Yale to take action against those students. In late January 2024, AIM had a doxxing truck at CU Boulder in Colorado; one professor moved class online as a consequence. On June 13, 2025, such a truck was parked outside Highland Hospital, in Oakland, California, displaying the name and face of a staff member, and claiming that she is a "violent antisemite".

== See also ==
- Fairness & Accuracy in Reporting
