= Dennis Roddy =

American journalist (born 1954)

- Born: 1954 (age 71–72); Johnstown, Pennsylvania
- Education: University of Pittsburgh at Johnstown
- Occupation: Journalist
- Notable credit(s): Greensburg Tribune-Review; Pittsburgh Press; Pittsburgh Post-Gazette
- Spouse: Joyce Gannon (m. 1991)
- Children: 4

Dennis Roddy (born 1954 in Johnstown, Pennsylvania) is an American journalist who was special assistant to former Pennsylvania Governor Tom Corbett, and a former columnist for the Pittsburgh Post-Gazette.

== Education ==
A native of Johnstown, Roddy was born the 4th of 5 children to an Irish American family. His father, Robert Roddy Sr., was a steelworker and negotiator for the United Steelworkers of America. He attended St. Benedict's parochial school in Geistown, Pennsylvania. He attended the University of Pittsburgh at Johnstown. As a student, he took a part-time job as a newswriter at WJAC-TV and later the Nanty Glo Journal and the Portage Dispatch.

== Career ==
Following graduation, Roddy accepted a position at the Tribune-Review in Greensburg, Pennsylvania, a position he held for 8 years before joining the Pittsburgh Press as a political reporter. In 1992, the financially ailing paper was purchased by the Pittsburgh Post-Gazette and Roddy joined its staff. In 1996, the Scripps Howard News Service began syndicating his political column across a dozen newspapers across the country.

An August 1998 profile of Roddy in Pittsburgh City Paper described him as having a knack for "getting into places other reporters find unobtainable -- the USAir jet crash site, President Clinton's limousine, a hotel elevator with presidential candidate Gary Hart and an attractive young woman." The article said that Roddy's "wit, his storytelling skills, his Irishness, infuse the paper. Readers -- whether they notice his name on top of stories or not -- gain their impression of what's going on around Pittsburgh, what's amusing and what's tragic about it, from Roddy. Many of the stories he tells linger in the mind a long time."

His notable articles have included a profile of Jerry Bowyer, Joe Waldholtz's financial crimes, and a powerful article describing an 8-year-old's testimony in a rape trial. In 1994, his award-winning article The Messenger Boys provided a first-hand account of an Irish Republican Army bomb attack in Belfast that killed 10. The City Paper article noted that he has "gone further than most reporters would dare in writing about his own family life," including familial discord and his Irish Catholic upbringing.

In September 2007, Roddy wrote an article about the impending divorce between Pittsburgh billionaire newspaper publisher Richard Mellon Scaife and his wife Margaret Ritchie Battle Scaife. The reporting in the article was supported by documents that Roddy obtained from documents inadvertently published on the internet by the Allegheny County Family Court. Scaife's suit and criminal complaints against Roddy were thrown out of court.

== Other writings and awards ==
Roddy wrote the foreword to the book Pennsylvania 24/7 by Rick Smolan and David Elliot Cohen. His work has been cited in A Force Upon the Plain by Kenneth S. Stern, The Hunting of the President by Joe Conason and Gene Lyons, and Blood and Politics by Leonard Zeskind.

In 2000, he was named "top columnist in the nation" by the Scripps Howard Foundation and he was named "top humor columnist" by the National Society of Newspaper Columnists and the three times by the Western Pennsylvania Press Club. In 2004, he received an "Honorable Mention" Keystone Press Award for his column from the Pennsylvania Newspaper Association. In 2005, he was named one of "Pennsylvania's Most Influential Reporters" by the Pennsylvania political news website PoliticsPA. In 2008, the political website PolitickerPA.com named him one of the "Most Powerful Political Reporters" in Pennsylvania.

== Personal life ==
Roddy lives in Pittsburgh with his wife, Joyce Gannon. They have two children. Roddy also has two older children from a previous marriage.
