= Vast right-wing conspiracy =

Conspiracy theory popularized by Hillary Clinton

"Vast right-wing conspiracy" is a phrase popularized by a 1995 memo by political opposition researcher Chris Lehane and then referenced in 1998 by the then-First Lady of the United States Hillary Clinton in defense of her husband, U.S. President Bill Clinton, characterizing the continued allegations of scandal against her and her husband, including the Lewinsky scandal, as part of a conspiracy by Clinton's political enemies.

Into the 21st century, the term continued to be used, including in a question posed to Bill Clinton in 2009 to describe verbal attacks on Barack Obama during his early presidency. Hillary Clinton mentioned it again during her 2016 presidential campaign. Additionally, conservatives used or adopted the term to mock it.

== Earlier uses ==
While popularized by Hillary Clinton in her 1998 The Today Show interview, the phrase did not originate with her. In 1991, the Detroit News wrote that "Thatcher-era Britain produced its own crop of paranoid left-liberal films. ... All posited a vast right-wing conspiracy [emphasis added] propping up a reactionary government ruthlessly crushing all efforts at opposition under the guise of parliamentary democracy." An Associated Press story in 1995 also used the phrase, relating an official's guess that the Oklahoma City bombing was the work of "maybe five malcontents" and not "some kind of vast right-wing conspiracy."

== Popularization ==
=== 1995 memo ===
A 332-page memo titled "Communication Stream of Conspiracy Commerce" was commissioned by Mark Fabiani and written by Chris Lehane in 1995. It was the first document to describe the conspiracies surrounding the Clintons. It described how conservative media outlets such as The American Spectator spread conspiracy theories about the suicide of Vince Foster, the Whitewater controversy, and other events. According to the memo, these conspiracies spread from conservative think tanks to British tabloids and then to the mainstream press.

=== The Today Show interview ===
In response to ongoing accusations surrounding the Clintons' investment in a real estate development known as Whitewater in the late 1970s and early 1980s, Attorney General Janet Reno had appointed an independent counsel, the Republican Ken Starr, to investigate those accusations in 1994.

Starr's investigation began to branch out into other issues, from Filegate to Travelgate and Bill Clinton's actions in the civil case of his alleged sexual harassment of Paula Jones prior to his presidency. In the course of the last of these, White House intern Monica Lewinsky signed an affidavit that she had not had a relationship with Clinton. Lewinsky's confidant Linda Tripp had been recording their phone conversations and offered Starr tapes of Lewinsky describing her feelings for, and alleging intimate encounters with, the president. Clinton was asked to give a deposition, and accusations that he lied about an affair under oath first made national headlines on January 17, 1998, when the story was picked up by the conservative-right e-mail newsletter The Drudge Report. Despite swift denials from Clinton, the media attention grew. On January 27, 1998, Hillary Clinton appeared on NBC's The Today Show in an interview with Matt Lauer.

Lauer: You have said, I understand, to some close friends, that this is the last great battle, and that one side or the other is going down here.
Clinton: Well, I don't know if I've been that dramatic. That would sound like a good line from a movie. But I do believe that this is a battle. I mean, look at the very people who are involved in this—they have popped up in other settings. This is—the great story here for anybody willing to find it and write about it and explain it is this vast right-wing conspiracy that has been conspiring against my husband since the day he announced for president.

Clinton elaborated by decrying the tactics and "the kind of intense political agenda at work here". Bob Woodward recounted in his book The Agenda (1994) that Hillary Clinton claimed that when her husband was making his decision to run for the presidency in 1991, he reported receiving "a direct threat from someone in the Bush White House, warning that if he ran, the Republicans would go after him. 'We will do everything we can to destroy you personally,' she recalled that the Bush White House man had said."

== Later uses ==
David Brock, a conservative-turned-liberal author, said he was once a part of an effort to dredge up a scandal against Clinton. In 1993, Brock was part of the American Spectator and was the first to report Jones' claims. As Brock explained in Blinded by the Right, after learning more about the events and conservative payments surrounding Jones, he personally apologized to the Clintons. He documented his experience in Blinded by the Right, wherein he alleged that Arkansas State Police troopers had taken money in exchange for testimony against Clinton which Brock had published in a previous book. Adam Curtis also discussed the concept in his documentary series The Power of Nightmares. Brock agreed with Clinton's claim that there was a "right wing conspiracy" to smear her husband, quibbling only with the characterization of it as "vast ", since Brock contended that it was orchestrated mainly by a few powerful people. MSNBC also described the comment as once-ridiculed but now taken more seriously by "many Democrats" who point "to the well-documented efforts by conservative financier Richard Mellon Scaife to fund a network of anti-Clinton investigations".

Specific claims of such funding were made against conservative Republican supporter and billionaire Richard Mellon Scaife. Scaife played a major role in funding the Arkansas Project investigating President Clinton; former Clinton White House Counsel Lanny Davis claimed Scaife was using his money "to destroy a president of the United States". Scaife claimed to be public about his political spending (q.v.). CNN stated in a study the news outlet conducted on Scaife, "If it's a conspiracy, it's a pretty open one." Hillary Clinton wrote in her 2003 autobiography, "Looking back, I see that I might have phrased my point more artfully, but I stand by the characterization of Starr's investigation [regardless of the truth about Lewinsky]." By 2007, her experiences caused her to say in presidential campaign appearances that the "vast right-wing conspiracy" was back, citing such cases as the 2002 New Hampshire Senate election phone jamming scandal. On the stump for Al Franken's 2008 Senate campaign, Bill Clinton acknowledged his Air America Radio show by quipping that he had been taking on the "vast right wing conspiracy before others even acknowledged that it existed." When asked on Meet the Press (September 27, 2009) whether the "vast right wing conspiracy" was involved in the attacks on President Barack Obama, Clinton said, "Oh, you bet. Sure it is. It's not as strong as it was, because America's changed demographically, but it's as virulent as it was ... when they accused me of murder and all that stuff."

Two other figures who used the phrase are Nobel laureate economist Paul Krugman and journalist Joe Conason. Conason did so in an article called "The vast right-wing conspiracy is back", referring to the National Republican Trust PAC and Newsmax, which are run by former foes of Clinton, and who made attacks on then-President Obama. The National Republican Trust PAC sponsored a campaign commercials against Obama in 2008 that was described by FactCheck.org as "one of the sleaziest false TV ads of the campaign". One of Newsmax's owners "was among the most insistent endorsers of the Obama birth certificate myth" and a popularizer of the canard that Clinton's White House counsel Vince Foster did not commit suicide—as determined by five official investigations—but was murdered.

In some of his books, Krugman used the phrase ("Yes, Virginia, there is a vast right-wing conspiracy"), for example to refer not to a conservative Republican-leaning campaign against Clinton or Obama but more generally to "an interlocking set of institutions ultimately answering to a small group of people that collectively reward loyalists and punish dissenters" in the service of "movement conservatism". In Krugman's view, the network of foundations that fund conservative scholarship, the national and regional think tanks and advocacy groups, talk radio media outlets, and conservative law firms through which they pushed their agenda to move the Republican Party to the right, far surpassed in funding, size, inter-connectedness, or influence anything the Democratic Party or the American Left and liberal movement have at their disposal. According to Krugman, the network of institutions provide "obedient politicians with the resources to win elections, safe havens in the event of defeat, and lucrative career opportunities after they leave office. They guarantee favorable news coverage to politicians who follow the party line, while harassing and undermining opponents. And they support a large standing army of party intellectuals and activists."

=== 2014 reemergence ===
In April 2014, the Clinton Presidential Center published the original 1995 memo on the alleged conspiracy. Chris Lehane, the memo's author, wrote, "As for the premise of the memo, I absolutely stand by it. Not only was it right about the right wing then, it is more accurate than ever today."

=== 2016 reemergence ===
In 2016, Hillary Clinton said she still believed in the "vast right-wing conspiracy", adding that it was "even better funded" 18 years later. At the same time, she opined, "At this point it's probably not correct to say it's a conspiracy because it's out in the open." In October 2016, after footage of Donald Trump "boasting" about his sexual exploits emerged and multiple women accused Trump of sexual misconduct, Melania Trump defended her husband and said, "This was all organized from the opposition." Writers for the Los Angeles Times and The Washington Post observed that Melania's response "echoed" Clinton's original use of the phrase "vast right-wing conspiracy".

== Use in popular culture ==
After the release of a deposition Clinton had given to for the Starr Report in which he perjured himself, some conservatives began to ironically adopt the phrasing of "vast right-wing conspiracy", or its acronym "VRWC". In 2004, conservative lawyer Mark W. Smith wrote the New York Times Best Seller Official Handbook of the Vast Right-Wing Conspiracy, which came with a "membership card" that made its owner an "official member of the VRWC". Similarly, a number of newspaper, magazine, and website articles used the phrase to report on left-wing politics. Eugene Volokh's blog The Volokh Conspiracy is said to have derived its name from as a reference to the "vast right-wing conspiracy" statement. Into the 2010s, the term itself continued to be mocked by conservatives.

== See also ==
- Basket of deplorables
- BlueAnon
- Clinton crazies
- Clinton plan intelligence conspiracy theory
