= Arkansas Project =

Series of investigative press reports that focused on then-President Bill Clinton

The Arkansas Project was a series of investigative press reports, funded primarily by conservative businessman Richard Mellon Scaife, that focused on criticism of then-President Bill Clinton and his administration. Scaife spent nearly $2 million on the project.

The investigations included the investigation of the 1970s real estate investment that Bill and Hillary Clinton had made in a development known as Whitewater, re-opening of allegations that then Governor Bill Clinton had sexually harassed an Arkansas state employee, and a reexamination of the death of White House aide Vincent Foster which multiple official investigations had found to be a suicide.

== Background ==
In the 1980s and 1990s, the politically conservative American Spectator magazine received donations from conservative benefactors. The Arkansas project began shortly after Richard Mellon Scaife, one of the largest donors to the magazine, directed that his donations be used for stories aimed at investigating potentially scandalous material regarding the Clintons. According to R. Emmett Tyrrell Jr., editor-in-chief of the Spectator, the idea for the Arkansas Project was hatched on a fishing trip on the Chesapeake Bay in the fall of 1993. The "Arkansas Project" name that later became famous was conceived as a joke; the actual name used within the Spectator and the Scaife foundation was the "Editorial Improvement Project".

Project reporter/investigators were hired, including David Brock, who later described his role at that of as a Republican "hitman", and Rex Armistead, a former police officer who was reportedly paid $350,000 for his efforts. Also assisting the project was Parker Dozhier, a bait shop owner who was reportedly obsessed with bringing down Bill Clinton. They were tasked with investigating the Clintons and uncovering stories tying the Clintons to murders and drug smuggling as well as adultery.

According to Brock, Armistead and Brock met at an airport hotel in Miami, Florida, in late 1993. There, Armistead laid out an elaborate "Vince Foster murder scenario", a scenario that Brock later claimed was implausible. Regardless, by the end of 1993, Brock was writing stories for the Spectator that made him "a lead figure in the drive to" expose Clinton.

Ted Olson, who would later represent George W. Bush in Bush v. Gore and be named U.S. Solicitor General, was a board member of the American Spectator Educational Foundation, and is thought to have known about or played some role in the Arkansas Project. His firm Gibson, Dunn & Crutcher provided $14,000 worth of legal services, and he himself wrote or co-authored several articles that were paid for with Project funds. During Olson's Senate confirmation hearing for Solicitor General, majority Republicans blocked Senator Patrick Leahy's call for further committee inquiries on the subject of Olson's ties to the Arkansas Project.

== News stories ==
The investigations funded by Scaife money mostly concentrated on the Whitewater investments, which extended to a conspiracy theory surrounding the death of Vince Foster, a Clinton aide with connections to Whitewater. Christopher W. Ruddy, a reporter for the Scaife-owned Pittsburgh Tribune-Review, published a series of articles claiming Clinton was behind Foster's suicide. Although Clinton was never found to have broken the law by Ken Starr, Ruddy published his book, The Strange Death of Vincent Foster, regardless. His conspiracy theories about Foster have since been dismissed even by some more outspoken conservatives like Ann Coulter. The Spectator stopped receiving Scaife funding when "it ran a scathing review of [the] book ..."

In late November 1997, after Jeff Corry's review of Ruddy's book was published, Reed Irvine of Accuracy in Media (who has received about $2 million from Scaife since 1977) "reported in his newsletter that Scaife had called Tyrrell to say he was cutting him off." In fact, "Tyrrell confirmed in an interview that the call occurred but said he couldn't remember details of the conversation that ended all support from the man who had been his principal benefactor for nearly 30 years."

In 1999, Joseph Farah's Western Journalism Center "placed some 50 ads reprinting Ruddy's Tribune-Review stories in The Washington Times, then repackaged the articles as a packet titled 'The Ruddy Investigation,' which sold for $12." Shortly thereafter, the Western Journalism Center "circulated a video featuring Ruddy's claims, 'Unanswered-The Death of Vincent Foster,' that was produced by author James Davidson, chairman of the National Taxpayers Union (NTU) and co-editor of the Strategic Investment newsletter."

In the late 1990s, Ruddy and Farah turned their focus to the internet with help from Scaife. Ruddy founded NewsMax and Farah started WorldNetDaily which report news from a conservative perspective. Eventually, Scaife became an investor and the third-largest stockholder of NewsMax.

== Paula Jones ==
As an early part of the Troopergate matter, writer David Brock published an article, His Cheating Heart that refers to a liaison between Clinton and woman named Paula. This led to the Paula Jones affair and later led Jones to sue Clinton, successfully obtaining an out-of-court settlement in the hundreds of thousands of dollars. Brock continued his conspiracy theorizing until a 1997 Esquire article titled "I Was a Conservative Hit Man" in which he recanted some of his claims. In 1998, he went further and personally apologized to Clinton. Brock was let go from the Spectator and published his 2002 book Blinded by the Right: The Conscience of an Ex-Conservative.

== See also ==
- The Clinton Chronicles
- The Hunting of the President
- "Vast Right-Wing Conspiracy"
- Citizens United (organization)
- David Bossie
- Floyd Brown
- David Hale
- James D. Johnson
- Opposition research
