= Suicide of Vince Foster =

1993 suicide of an American White House lawyer

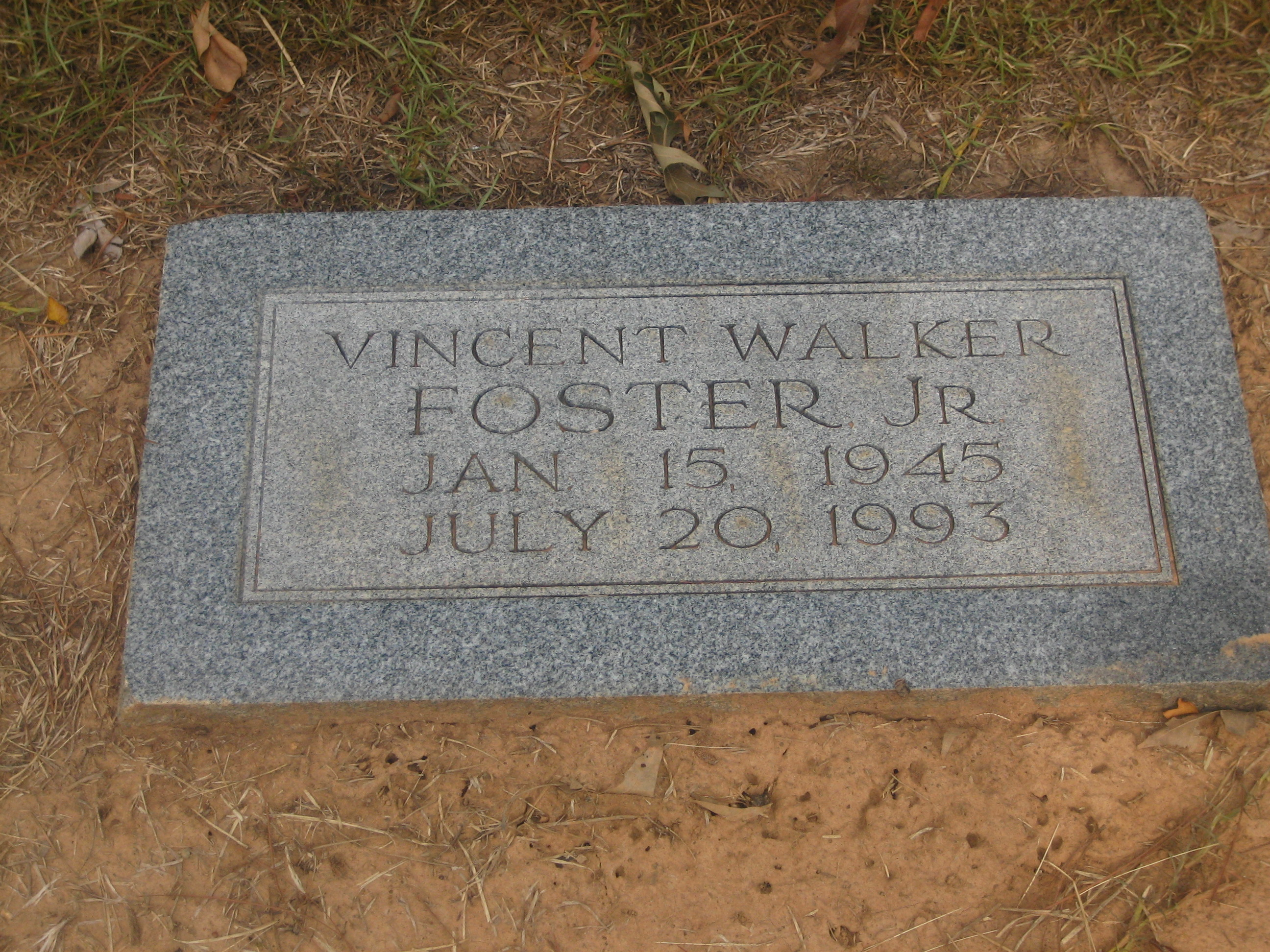
- Foster's grave in Hope, Arkansas
- Date: July 20, 1993; 33 years ago
- Location: Fort Marcy Park, Fairfax County, Virginia, U.S.
- Cause: Suicide by gunshot
- Burial: Memory Gardens Cemetery

Deputy White House counsel Vince Foster was found dead in Fort Marcy Park off the George Washington Memorial Parkway in Virginia, outside Washington, D.C., on July 20, 1993. Foster's death was ruled a suicide by five official investigations, though conspiracy theories speculating foul play emerged.

== Suicide and investigation ==
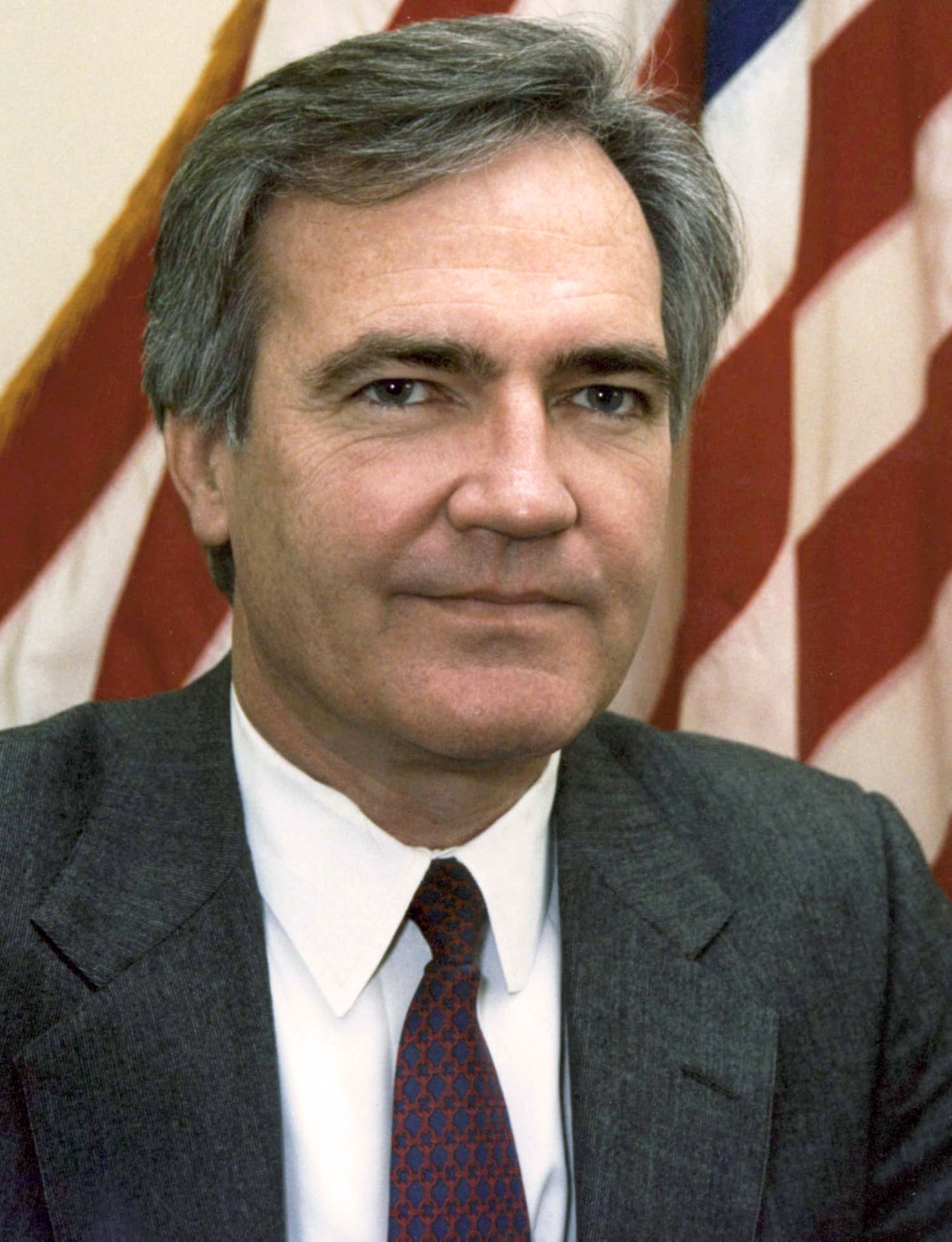
Foster in February 1993, a few months before his death

Park Police discovered Foster dead from an apparent self-inflicted gunshot wound to the head in Fort Marcy Park (off the George Washington Memorial Parkway in Virginia) on July 20, 1993. He was found holding a Colt .38 Special in his right hand, his thumb hooked through the trigger guard.

An autopsy and subsequent investigation later concluded Foster had died by shooting himself once in the mouth with the gun found at the scene.

Subsequent investigations found that Foster was distraught over accusations and criticisms related to the White House travel office controversy. Foster had confided to friends and colleagues that he was considering resignation, but feared that he could not handle the "personal humiliation" of returning to Arkansas in defeat. Foster admitted to his sister that he was depressed shortly before his death, and he sought treatment for depression one day before committing suicide.

Although police found no evidence of foul play, several tabloids and newsletters speculated that Foster's death may have been a homicide, possibly involving the Clintons themselves. Subsequent investigations by special prosecutor Robert Fiske and the Senate Banking Committee concluded that there was no evidence of a homicide. A final investigation, led by special prosecutor Kenneth Starr, also concluded that there was no evidence to support the claim that Foster was murdered. Starr's report addressed several additional questions about physical and forensic evidence that had previously fueled speculation about the case. The report established that Foster owned the handgun used in the suicide, and confirmed that the body had not been moved from its position prior to its discovery by police. The report concluded "In sum, based on all of the available evidence, which is considerable, the OIC [Office of Independent Counsel] agrees with the conclusion reached by every official entity that has examined the issue: Mr. Foster committed suicide by gunshot in Fort Marcy Park on July 20, 1993."

The suicide has nevertheless continued to fuel speculation: then-presidential candidate Donald Trump made news in 2016 when he remarked in an interview with the Washington Post that Foster's death was "very fishy", and added "I will say there are people who continue to bring it up because they think it was absolutely a murder. I don't do that because I don't think it's fair."

== Evidence ==
=== Torn note ===
Text of Foster's resignation letter

I made mistakes from ignorance, inexperience and overwork I did not knowingly violate any law or standard of conduct

No one in The White House, to my knowledge, violated any law or standard of conduct, including any action in the travel office. There was no intent to benefit any individual or specific group

The FBI lied in their report to the AG

The press is covering up the illegal benefits they received from the travel staff

The GOP has lied and misrepresented its knowledge and role and covered up a prior investigation

The Ushers Office plotted to have excessive costs incurred, taking advantage of Kaki and HRC

The public will never believe the innocence of the Clintons and their loyal staff

The WSJ editors lie without consequence

I was not meant for the job or the spotlight of public life in Washington. Here ruining people is considered sport.

—

A draft of a resignation letter was found torn into 27 pieces in a briefcase after his death. Associate White House counsel, Steve Neuwirth, discovered the torn pieces of the note in Foster's briefcase on July 26. After receiving the note from Neuwirth, White House Counsel Bernard Nussbaum handled the note various times before giving it to Park Police Lieutenant Joseph Megby the following evening.

The United States Department of Justice revealed the note's contents at a joint press conference with the Park Police on August 10. The DoJ stated that a smudged palm print was on the note, but no fingerprints; they confirmed the handwriting as Foster's.

Independent Counsel Robert Ray's report regarding the Whitewater controversy stated the FBI Laboratory performed a 1995 fingerprint examination of the note and identified Nussbaum's palm print on it. Three handwriting experts stated that the note was a forgery, with Oxford University manuscript expert Reginald Alton stating that the forgery was done by a "moderate forger, not necessarily a pro, somebody who could forge a check." However, the final report stated that three separate handwriting analyses of the note by the Capitol Police and the FBI determined that the handwriting on the note was Foster's.

== Conspiracy theories ==
=== The Arkansas Project ===
On May 2, 1999, The Washington Post published new details on the pursuit of a Foster conspiracy in an article by David Brock, a key figure in the Troopergate and Whitewater scandals whose disillusionment with the political corruption motivating what would come to be known as the Arkansas Project ended his commitment to the Conservative movement and facilitated public dissemination of insider details on what he described as G.O.P. machinations. The article explains how Brock was "summoned" to a meeting with Rex Armistead in Miami, Florida at an airport hotel. Brock claims that Armistead laid out for him an elaborate "Vince Foster murder scenario" – a scenario that he found implausible.

=== The Clinton Chronicles: A Political Firestorm ===
In 1997, crime reporter Dan Moldea was approached by Regnery Publishing House, a conservative group whose leadership was impressed by Moldea's published works, to publish a book on the Foster case.

In researching Foster's death, Moldea found that documents relating to the Whitewater corporation were removed from Foster's office on July 22 and sent to the Clintons’ personal attorney, and that the most oft-used conspiracy scenario could be traced back to Park Police Major Robert Hines, who shared the idea with Reed Irvine (Accuracy in Media) and Christopher Ruddy (New York Post). Moldea concludes, and Maj. Hines publicly maintains, that Hines incorrectly told Irvine and Ruddy "... that there is no exit wound in Foster's head ... I don't think there was anything nefarious here; he was being approached by reporters and he wanted something to say." Still, the "missing exit wound" claim continued to surface.

Moldea's research sought, among other things, to discover the origins of this line of investigation into the Clintons' credibility. In an interview for Salon.com, he suggests that "Foster had some blond hair and carpet fibers on his suit jacket, and he had semen in his underwear. So, the Jerry Falwells and the right-wing crowd get a hold of this information, and... they start making movies alleging that the Clintons were involved in this murder."

In 1994, Falwell subsidized the creation of a film called The Clinton Chronicles that featured Ruddy's claims that the gun that killed Foster was placed in his hand after the fact, and that Foster's body was laid out to give the appearance of suicide, among others. Funding for the film was provided by Citizens for Honest Government, an organization to which Falwell gave $200,000 in 1994 and 1995.

Citizens for Honest Government covertly paid individuals who had provided information to media outlets such as the Wall Street Journal editorial page and the American Spectator magazine;" and in 1995, made discretionary payments to two Arkansas state troopers who had spoken out in support of the idea of a conspiracy surrounding Foster's death. The two troopers, Roger Perry and Larry Patterson, had also previously given testimony supporting Paula Jones's claims of sexual misconduct and misuse of government resources against Bill Clinton (see Troopergate).

== See also ==
- Furtive fallacy
- Murder of Seth Rich
- Clinton body count conspiracy theory
