= Eugene Lyons (disambiguation) =

Gene or Eugene Lyons may refer to:

- Eugene Lyons (1898–1985), American journalist and political biographer
- Gene Lyons (actor) (1921–1974), American member of Ironside cast
- Gene Lyons (born 1943), American political columnist
