= The Hunting of the President =

2004 documentary film by Nickolas Perry and Harry Thomason

- Directed by: Nickolas Perry; Harry Thomason
- Written by: Nickolas Perry; Harry Thomason
- Based on: The Hunting of the President by: Joe Conason; Gene Lyons
- Produced by: Douglas Jackson
- Distributed by: Regent Releasing
- Release date: 2004
- Running time: 90 minutes
- Country: United States
- Language: English

The Hunting of the President is a 2004 English-language documentary film about former U.S. President Bill Clinton. Clinton and his wife Hillary Clinton appear in archived footage. The film is based on the book The Hunting of the President: The Ten-Year Campaign to Destroy Bill and Hillary Clinton, written by investigative journalists Joe Conason and Gene Lyons, and published by Thomas Dunne Books in 2000. Narrated by Morgan Freeman, the film premiered at the 2004 Sundance Film Festival.

The book and movie explore Clinton friends Jim and Susan McDougal, former Associate Attorney General Webster Hubbell, and Arkansas Governor Jim Guy Tucker. Interviewed for the book and movie, Susan McDougal discusses legal threats from the independent counsel to pressure her to implicate the Clintons in something illegal. She told the independent counsel the Clintons did nothing wrong, and the independent counsel said they had statements prepared and she simply had to agree with the pre-written claims.

The film was nominated for Best Documentary Screenplay from the Writers Guild of America.

== Book ==
- Conason, Joe, and Lyons, Gene, The Hunting of the President, ©2000 Thomas Dunne Books. (ISBN 0-312-27319-3)

== See also ==
- Arkansas Project
- Troopergate (Bill Clinton)
- Vast right-wing conspiracy
- Whitewater controversy
