= Gilbert Vanderwerken =

American businessman (1810–1894)

Gilbert Vanderwerken (5 February 1810 – 22 January 1894) was a businessman and manufacturer of omnibuses in the 19th century.

== Biography ==
Vanderwerken was born in 1810 in Waterford, New York. He left home at the age of 17 to become an apprentice to a stagecoach builder in Newark, New Jersey. In 1830, he opened his own coach-building business in Newark, but it went bankrupt during the financial depression of 1837.

Vanderwerken relocated to Washington, D.C., between 1848 and 1850 to take personal control of Washington's first successful omnibus line. The Vanderwerken Company line, closely following the horse-drawn coach routes of the early 19th century, traveled from Georgetown to the Navy Yard via M Street and Pennsylvania Avenue for a one-way fare of 12.5 cents. The omnibus, seating twelve passengers, bore the names of persons, historical events, or pictures of other fashionable modes of transportation on the side panels. The stables were located in a former tobacco warehouse at 3222 M Street in Georgetown. The Washington and Georgetown Railroad leased the omnibus line on July 1, 1862, and soon replaced it, donating the vehicles to the Army Medical Department.

Living in Washington, D.C., Vanderwerken purchased 1,316 acres (5.33 km^{2}) of Virginia property as pastureland for the horses. About 1852, Vanderwerken improved the farm by having a dwelling erected on "a hilltop in a grove of fine oak trees at the northwest corner of Little Falls and Glebe Roads." The dwelling was intended to be used as rental housing and as a summer retreat for the family. On his property, he also established a quarry business, the Potomac Blue Stone Company. The stone blasted from the palisades was used to build Healy Hall of Georgetown University and St. Elizabeths Hospital.

During the Civil War, the Vanderwerken family remained in Georgetown, having agreed to allow Union General Winfield Scott Hancock use of the house known as Falls Grove as an army hospital. In return, Hancock guaranteed protection of the buildings and fine grove of trees. The General used the two-story carpenter shop as his headquarters. Because of the strategic location of the property, it also became the site of Fort Ethan Allen and Fort Marcy. The property on which Fort Ethan Allen was constructed was returned to the heirs of Gilbert Vanderwerken following the war.

Fort Ethan Allen was ordered abandoned in the fall of 1865, and soon thereafter was dismantled. Much of what could be salvaged from the fort was sold by the government at public auction. The land under Fort Ethan Allen belonged throughout the war to Vanderwerken. After the war, as partial payment for the use of his land, Vanderwerken was given some of the lumber from the fort. The lumber reportedly was used to build Bellevue, the home of Vanderwerken's daughter and son-in-law, Alfred and Jane Grunwell. Bellevue is located at 3311 N. Glebe Road.
