= The Strange Death of Vincent Foster =

Book by Christopher Ruddy

The Strange Death of Vincent Foster: An Investigation
- Cover of the first edition
- Author: Christopher Ruddy
- Language: English
- Subject: Suicide of Vince Foster
- Publisher: Free Press
- Publication date: 1997
- Publication place: United States
- Media type: Print
- Pages: 320
- ISBN: 978-0-684-83837-3

The Strange Death of Vincent Foster: An Investigation is a 1997 book by the journalist Christopher Ruddy. Ruddy first wrote about the Foster story while reporting for The New York Post and the Pittsburgh Tribune-Review, owned by the millionaire Richard Scaife. The book is about a conspiracy theory tying Bill and Hillary Clinton to the alleged murder of Vincent Foster. There were three separate official investigations of Foster's death, each concluding that he committed suicide. Ruddy believes Kenneth Starr's investigation was part of the conspiracy, calling Starr a "patsy for the Clintonites and those that believe that the stability and reputation of America is more important than justice."

== Content ==
Former FBI Director William S. Sessions described Ruddy's inquiry into Foster's death as "serious and compelling". Richard Brookhiser (editor of the conservative National Review) wrote in The New York Times that "Ruddy argues that his doubts do not require him to posit some vast conspiracy of silence... At the same time Ruddy clearly believes that something dastardly happened, and he cannot stop dark hints from leaking out." Brookhiser wrote "'If,' Ruddy writes on page 1, Vince Foster 'had been killed ...' If Ruddy didn't want to make such an Oliver Stone argument, even hypothetically, he should have left his rhetorical teasers on the cutting-room floor."

Jacob Cohen (professor at Brandeis University) wrote in National Review that the book was "conspiracy central", while Ann Coulter "ripped it as a 'conservative hoax book' that was 'discredited' by conservatives." A Slate review called the book "absurd".
