= Wladyslaw Pleszczynski =

Wladyslaw "Wlady" Pleszczynski (born 1949) is an American conservative editor and writer. He is editorial director and web editor of The American Spectator. His tenure at Spectator dates back to the early 1980s.

He is also a distinguished visiting fellow at the Hoover Institution, Pleszczynski edited Our Brave New World: Essays on the Impact of September 11 (ISBN 978-0817939014) for Hoover Institution Press in 2002. He has written for the Wall Street Journal, Commentary, Slate, and other publications, as well as appearing on C-SPAN.

Pleszczynski is considered a mentor to Malcolm Gladwell.
