= Joe Conason =

Journalist, author and political commentator (born 1954)

- Born: c. 1954; New York City, U.S.
- Education: Brandeis University
- Occupations: Journalist, author, commentator
- Spouse: Elizabeth Horan Wagley (m. 2002)
- Children: 2
- Relatives: Joseph J. Cohen (grandfather)
- Writing career
- Notable work: Non-fiction
- Website: nationalmemo.com

Joseph Conason (born c. 1954) is an American journalist, author and liberal political commentator. He is the founder and editor-in-chief of The National Memo, a daily political newsletter and website that features breaking news and commentary.

Conason was formerly the executive editor of the New York Observer, where he wrote a popular political column for almost 20 years. He was also a columnist for Salon.com from 1998 to 2010. His articles have appeared in dozens of publications around the world including The New York Times, The Washington Post, The New Yorker, The New Republic, The Nation, The Guardian, The Village Voice and Harpers. A winner of the New York Press Club's Byline Award, Conason has covered every American presidential election since 1980.

Conason's books include The Hunting of the President (2000) and Big Lies: The Right-Wing Propaganda Machine and How It Distorts the Truth (2003). His Man of the World (2016) focuses on the post-presidency of Bill Clinton. The Longest Con: How Grifters, Swindlers, and Frauds Hijacked American Conservatism (2024), chiefly criticizing Donald Trump, exposes fraudsters and charlatans within the ranks of American conservatism and the religious right.

== Early life ==
Conason was born in New York City and grew up in White Plains, New York. Conason's parents, Eleanor (née Levinson; August 20, 1917 – January 5, 2002) and Emanuel Voltaire Conason (1912–2008), co-owned Ellie Conason, a contemporary design and crafts store in White Plains. Emanuel's father Joseph J. Cohen (né Kantorowitz; 1878–1953) was an immigrant from what is now Belarus and filed a petition to change Emanuel's last name to Conason when Emanuel was 19, in order to increase Emanuel's chances of admission to Harvard University.

Conason earned a degree in history from Brandeis University in 1975.

== Career ==
After college, Conason was appointed co-editor of the East Boston Community News and then he joined the staff of The Real Paper, an alternative weekly based in Cambridge, Massachusetts. He covered environmental, racial, and political issues for both publications.

From 1978 to 1990, Conason worked as a columnist, staff writer, and national correspondent for the counter-cultural The Village Voice in New York City where he made a name for himself as an experienced and skilled reporter as well as a sharp commentator. His investigative reporting in 1985 exposed the hidden Manhattan real estate holdings of President of the Philippines Ferdinand Marcos (and his wife, Imelda), thereby helping to topple their dictatorial government.

During 1986–87, Conason traveled repeatedly to the Philippines to write about politics there. In 1989, he arrived in Beijing the night after the Tiananmen Square massacre and reported on the tragic aftermath for The Village Voice. After leaving The Village Voice in the early 1990s, Conason served as editor-at-large for the Condé Nast's Details magazine, which focused on lifestyle, political, and social issues.

For almost two decades (from 1992 to 2010), Conason served as a columnist, political editor, executive editor, and national correspondent for the New York Observer, a weekly publication whose founder, Arthur Carter, had previously been associated with The Nation.

During the presidency of Bill Clinton, Conason's investigative reporting on Whitewater brought him national media attention, and he was a frequent cable television guest during Bill Clinton's impeachment trial from 1998 to 1999. During this time, he wrote about the "Arkansas Project", a secret, multi-million-dollar plan funded by conservative Pittsburgh billionaire Richard Mellon Scaife to find (or invent) negative material about the Clintons.

In 2004, Conason was one of the first journalists to delve into the background and finances of the group known as the "Swift Boat Veterans for Truth", which had targeted Democratic presidential nominee and Vietnam veteran John Kerry. Since 2006, he has served as editor of The Investigative Fund, a nonprofit journalism center.

In July 2011, Conason founded a daily political newsletter called The National Memo to try "to bring to readers a very sharp take on the day's news, a fair amount of original news, and aggregation." According to The National Memo, it aims to combine "the spirit of investigative journalism with new technology and ideas." They cover various political related stories including campaigns, elections, the White House and presidency, Congress, and beyond.

== Writing ==
In 1992, Conason wrote an article for Spy Magazine that claimed then President of the United States George H. W. Bush had cheated on his wife, Barbara. Conason explained in a later Salon article, "I examined the rumors and allegations — and knocked down most of them. Yes, I quoted many anonymous sources on the subject. But I also quoted Washington journalists Jack Germond, Fred Barnes and the great Walter Pincus — along with the president's son George W. — denying any substance to such allegations ... If I have any qualms about the Bush story, they're the same ones that I felt at the time. The headline — 'He cheats on his wife' — oversold what we were publishing, as I told [Spy editors Kurt] Andersen and [Susan] Morrison. They disagreed. And the Spy style tended to preface allegations with the word "alleged" less diligently than other publications."

In February 2000, Conason published an investigative profile of George W. Bush in Harper's Magazine that examined his business career in Texas and how his former business partners potentially profited from state investments after Bush became governor. This story was revived in 2002, early in Bush's presidency, when his ties to Harken Energy came under scrutiny.

Along with Arkansas journalist Gene Lyons, Conason was the co-author of The Hunting of the President: The 10 Year Campaign to Destroy Bill and Hillary Clinton (St. Martin's Press, 2001) with Arkansas journalist, Gene Lyons. The book focused on what he described as a "vast right-wing conspiracy" to bring down Bill Clinton—a term initially used by Hillary Clinton in defending her husband against accusations during his ultimately successful 1992 presidential bid—by identifying the main participants, revealing their tactics, tracing the millions of dollars spent on their efforts, and examining how (and why) mainstream news organizations helped those determined to bring down the Clintons. The book, a New York Times bestseller, was later turned into a documentary in 2004, which Conason co-produced.

Conason's next endeavor, Big Lies: The Right-Wing Propaganda Machine and How It Distorts the Truth, addressed what he labeled right-wing bias and purporting to debunk ten lies he claimed are perpetrated by conservative propaganda. This was Conason's second New York Times-bestselling book.

Conason profiled Bill Clinton for Esquire in December 2005, after traveling to Africa with the former president and covering the inaugural conference of the Clinton Global Initiative. The cover story, titled "The Third Term: The Dawning of a Different Sort of Post-Presidency", was later included in Best American Political Writing of 2006, published by Thunder's Mouth Press.

The Raw Deal: How the Bush Republicans Plan to Destroy Social Security and the Legacy of the New Deal, about what Conason claimed was the Bush administration's efforts to "end Social Security as we know it", appeared in 2005 with a preface by Al Franken, another liberal writer who later served as a U.S. Senator from Minnesota.

Following The Raw Deal and Big Lies, Conason wrote It Can Happen Here: Authoritarian Peril in the Age of Bush (St. Martin's Press, January 2008). The title comes from Sinclair Lewis' 1935 novel It Can't Happen Here, which portrayed an American dictatorship. In this book, Conason discussed what he viewed as a move towards authoritarianism during the administration of George W. Bush.

During the 2016 United States presidential election campaign, Conason and Gene Lyons published a free e-book called The Hunting of Hillary, which was primarily based on their previous book, The Hunting of the President. The e-book reviews more than twenty years of alleged Clinton scandals including Whitewater with a particular focus on Hillary Clinton.

In September 2016, Simon & Schuster published Man of the World: The Further Endeavors of Bill Clinton, Conason's account of the 42nd president's post-presidency. Conason interviewed Bill, Hillary, and Chelsea Clinton and many of Clinton's friends, aides, rivals and supporters to offer a comprehensive analysis of Clinton's post-presidency.

=== The Longest Con (2024) ===
In 2024, Conason published The Longest Con: How Grifters, Swindlers, and Frauds Hijacked American Conservatism, which chiefly criticizes Donald Trump, exposes fraudsters and alleged charlatans within the ranks of American conservatism and the religious right dating back to Joseph McCarthy. NBC and The New Yorker recommended it as important reading for understanding politics in 2024.

== Public appearances ==
Conason has made many appearances on radio and television including MSNBC and CNN.

== Personal life ==
Conason is Jewish. In October 2002, Conason married Elizabeth Horan Wagley, then the development director of the U.S. branch of Médecins du Monde. They have two children, Edward and Eleanor, and currently reside in New York City.

== Books ==
- The Longest Con: How Grifters, Swindlers, and Frauds Hijacked American Conservatism, St. Martin's Press, 2024; ISBN 978-1250621160
- Man of the World: The Further Endeavors of Bill Clinton, Simon & Schuster, 2016; ISBN 9781439154106
- Sarah Posner, Joe Conason, God's Profits: Faith, Fraud, and the Republican Crusade for Values Voters, PolipointPress, 2008; ISBN 9780979482212
- It Can Happen Here: Authoritarian Peril in the Age of Bush, St. Martin's Press, 2007 ISBN 978-0-312-37930-8
- The Raw Deal: How the Bush Republicans Plan to Destroy Social Security and the Legacy of the New Deal, PoliPointPress, 2005; ISBN 9780976062127
- Big Lies: The Right-Wing Propaganda Machine and How It Distorts the Truth. St. Martin's Press. June 15, 2003. ISBN 978-0-312-31561-0.
- Gene Lyons; Joe Conason (February 3, 2001). The Hunting of the President: The Ten-Year Campaign to Destroy Bill and Hillary Clinton. St. Martin's Press. ISBN 978-1-4668-2873-5.
