= Robert Stacy McCain =

American journalist

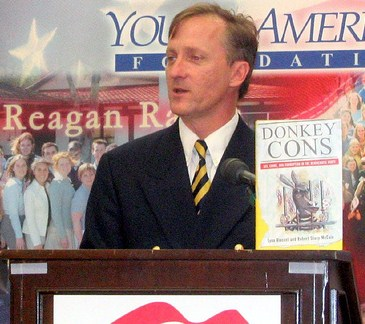
- McCain at Young America's Foundation event
- Born: October 6, 1959 (age 66); Atlanta, Georgia, U.S.
- Education: Jacksonville State University
- Occupations: Journalist, columnist, editor, blogger, author, political activist
- Notable credit(s): The Washington Times, Donkey Cons, theothermccain.com
- Website: http://theothermccain.com/

Robert Stacy McCain (born October 6, 1959) is an American conservative journalist, writer, and blogger. McCain is a former assistant national editor and reporter for The Washington Times and co-author (with Lynn Vincent) of the 2006 book Donkey Cons: Sex, Crime, and Corruption in the Democratic Party. He is proprietor of the blog, The Other McCain.

== Early life ==
Robert Stacy McCain was born on October 6, 1959.

== Career ==
=== The Washington Times ===
McCain joined the staff of The Washington Times in November 1997. In addition to his regular duties as an editor, McCain also contributed numerous by-lined news and feature articles to The Washington Times. He frequently reported on controversial issues in the "culture war," including stories related to sexuality, education, and history. His writing about communism included feature stories about Joseph McCarthy, The Black Book of Communism, and the obituary of former U.S. Communist Party leader Gus Hall. McCain's reporting on controversies surrounding sexuality included features about Alfred Kinsey, the Jesse Dirkhising murder case, the Centers for Disease Control and Prevention (CDC), and Judith Levine's controversial 2002 book, Harmful to Minors.

In 2003, McCain was named editor of the "Culture, Etc." page of The Washington Times, which appears on Page A2 of the newspaper Monday through Friday. Over the years, McCain interviewed many prominent authors and personalities.

In 2006, McCain co-wrote Donkey Cons with Lynn Vincent (ISBN 978-1-59555-024-8), and created a blog to promote the book.

McCain also contributed freelance articles, reviews and commentary pieces to a number of publications including The American Spectator, Reason, The American Conservative, Ripon Forum, and Chronicles: A Magazine of American Culture.

=== 2008 - present ===
In January 2008, McCain announced he would resign from The Washington Times in order to concentrate on a book project and began blogging about the 2008 presidential race as "The Other McCain." In March 2010, McCain returned to the Times as a freelance writer, covering a New York congressional race with a candidate with connections to the Tea Party.

On March 13, 2013, McCain was named the editor-in-chief at ViralRead.com.

In February 2017, McCain was permanently banned from Twitter for "participating in targeted abuse."

== Controversy ==
The Southern Poverty Law Center reported in 2000 that McCain was once a member of the League of the South. Writer Barrett Brown accuses McCain of failing to disclose conflicts of interest, writing in his book Hot, Fat and Clouded, that McCain is "a member of the sons of Confederate Veterans, for instance, an organization which the reader may recall from a few seconds ago, when McCain was covering it in the context of an objective news article regarding a controversial dispute between the organization of which he's a member and a fellow whom he and the organization both strongly opposed -- and who belonged to a certain race with whom McCain has elsewhere expressed great interest."

Brown also accuses McCain of writing under the pseudonym "Burke C. Dabney" for the white supremacist magazine American Renaissance.

== Personal life ==
McCain lives on the Atlantic Seaboard with his wife. They have six children, whom they homeschooled. He is a Baptist, and has remarked, "I am a poor excuse for a Christian, but I really do have a deep faith in God".

McCain frequently derides now-deceased U.S. Senator and former presidential candidate John McCain as "Crazy Cousin John". The distant kinship is based on a common ancestor in South Carolina listed in the 1790 Census.
