= Fort Ethan Allen (Arlington, Virginia) =

- U.S. National Register of Historic Places
- Virginia Landmarks Register
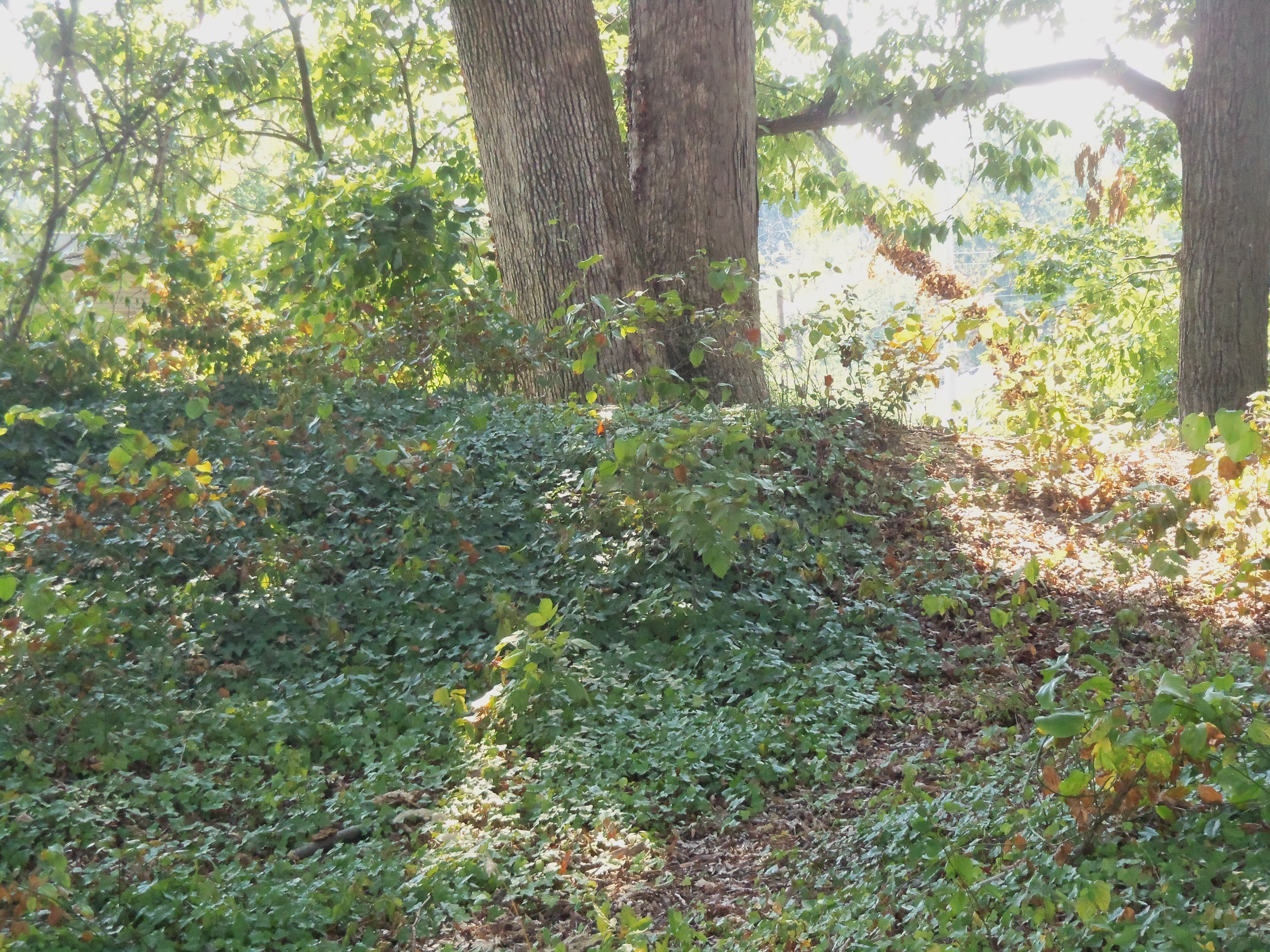
- A section of the earthworks that remain.

- Location within District of Columbia Location within Virginia Location within the United States
- Location: Address Restricted, Arlington, Virginia
- Coordinates: 38°55′26″N 77°7′26″W
- Area: 9.8 acres (4.0 ha)
- Built: 1861
- Architect: Barnard, Gen. John Gross
- NRHP reference No.: 04000052
- VLR No.: 000-5819

Significant dates
- Added to NRHP: February 11, 2004
- Designated VLR: December 3, 2003

Fort Ethan Allen was an earthwork fortification that the Union Army built in 1861 on the property of Gilbert Vanderwerken in Alexandria County (now Arlington County), Virginia, as part of the Civil War defenses of Washington (see Washington, D.C., in the American Civil War). The remains of the fort are now within Arlington County's Fort Ethan Allen Park.

== History ==
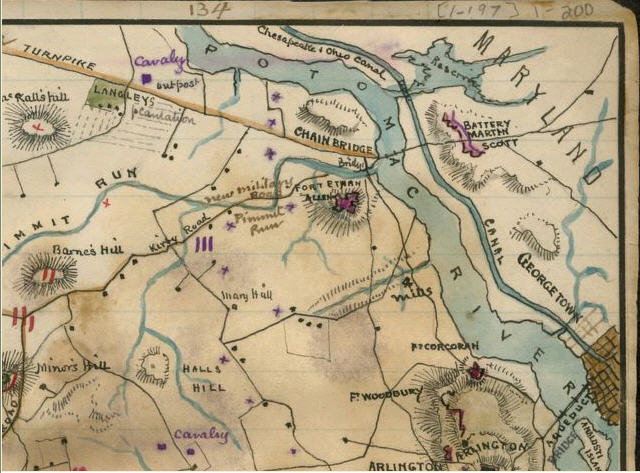
Map of Civil War fortifications near Chain Bridge, including Fort Ethan Allen (September 1861)

The Union Army built Fort Ethan Allen in September 1861, shortly after the Army's rout at the First Battle of Bull Run (Manassas) in late July of that year. The fortification was a large bastion-style fort that was located in the County's highlands near the Potomac River.

Before the Army constructed the fort, farmland and forests filled the area. To allow for clear lines of sight toward other fortifications and approaches to Washington, D.C., the Army removed trees and other vegetation that were near the site.

Built like other northern Virginia defenses, the fort was constructed following the directives of General John G. Barnard of the United States Army Corps of Engineers. The walls of the fort were made stronger than most other such forts because it protected Chain Bridge, one of the most important approaches to Washington from the south.

The Chain Bridge forts in Virginia (Fort Marcy and Fort Ethan Allen) considerably strengthened the web of fortifications that defended the northern flank of the Arlington Line. Because of its size and location, Fort Ethan Allen was a critical element of this comer of the Washington defenses.

A line of trenches and roads, which were used to transport troops and supplies, connected the fortifications of the Arlington Line. In addition, the fort was connected by a long series of trenches and earthworks to the nearby Fort Marcy and Potomac River.

The fort consisted of four main faces, with additional angles built into the north and east faces. It maintained a perimeter of 768 yards (702 m) with emplacements for 34 guns. Interior structures included two bomb-proofs, ammunition magazines, and other supporting structures.

A May 7, 1864, report from the Union Army's Inspector of Artillery (see Union Army artillery organization) noted the following:

Fort Ethan Allen, Col. A. A. Gibson commanding.–Garrison, nine companies Second Pennsylvania Heavy Artillery–1 colonel, 29 commissioned officers, 1,346 men, and 1 ordnance-sergeant. Armament, nine 6-pounder field guns, three 10-pounder Parrotts, three 32-pounder bronze howitzers, four 24-pounder siege guns, two 8-inch sea-coast howitzers, eleven 30-pounder Parrotts, six 24-pounder Coehorn mortars, four 10-inch siege mortars. Magazines, four; dry and serviceable. Ammunition, full supply and in good order. Implements, complete and serviceable. Drill in artillery, ordinary; needs improving. Drill in infantry, very indifferent; needs much improving. Discipline, indifferent. Garrison larger than necessary. Cavalry garrison, one company (E) Thirteenth New York Cavalry–2 commissioned officers, 78 enlisted men, 53 equipped, 52 horses.

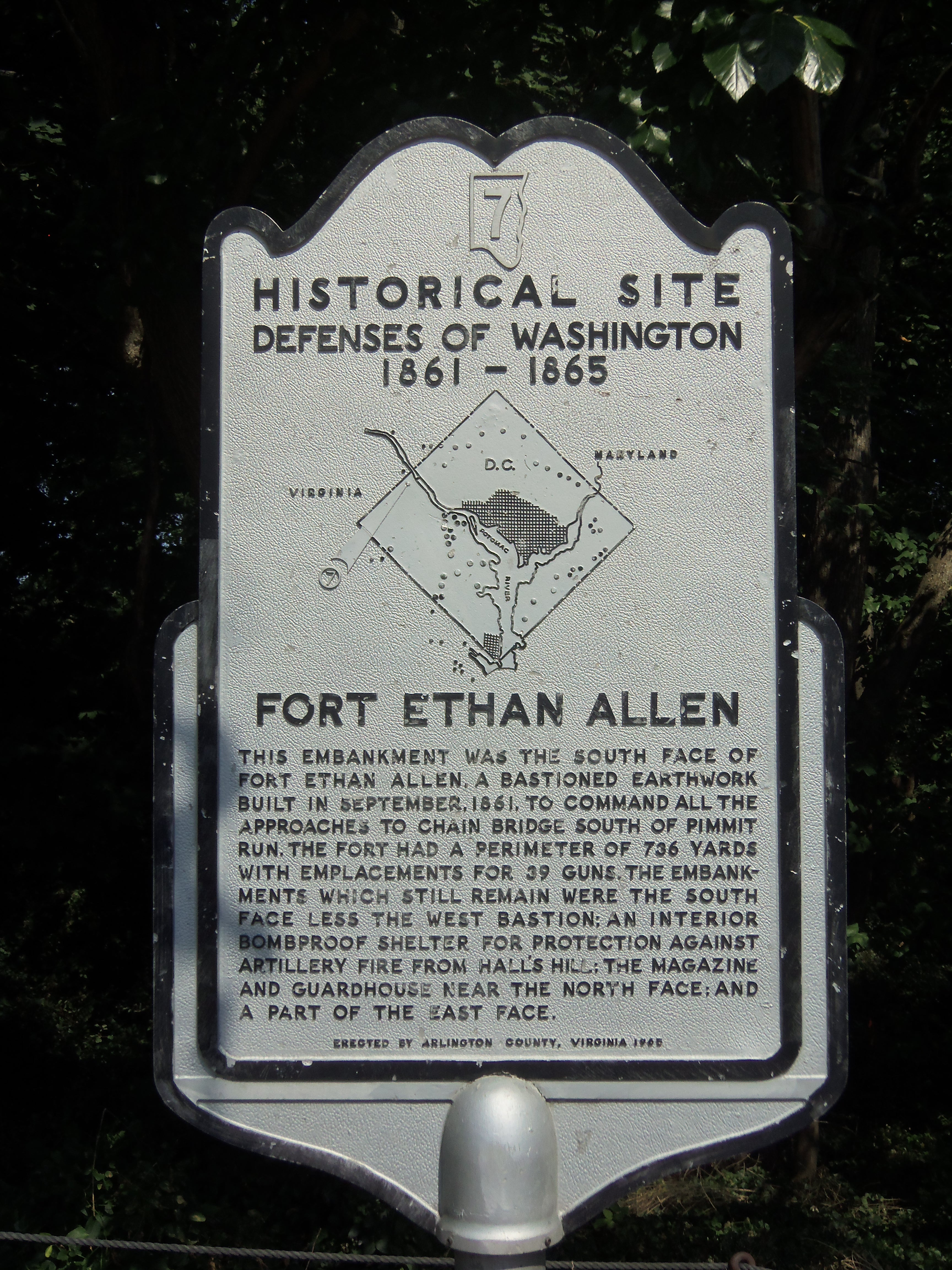
1965 historical marker at Fort Ethan Allen (2013)

There was no military action at the fort throughout the Civil War; the only Confederate Army attack on Washington's fortifications occurred north of the city in 1864 during the Battle of Fort Stevens. Perhaps the most memorable wartime occurrence at Fort Ethan Allen was a visit by President Abraham Lincoln during the fort's construction.

In 1965, the Arlington County government erected a historic marker near the site of the fort. The Arlington County Board designated the fort to be a local historic district on October 3, 1978. The National Park Service listed the fort on the National Register of Historic Places on February 11, 2004.

In 2014, the Arlington County government installed nine interpretive panels within Fort Ethan Allen Park as part of its Neighborhood Conservation Program. In addition, the Virginia Civil War Trails has placed a historic marker near the fort's site.

== Existing remnants ==
Fort Ethan Allen retains several major aboveground features. These include large earthworks, one bombproof, gun platforms, and traces of magazines. The fort's remaining interior structures remain visible, as do the fort's south face, centrally located bombproof, and remaining north face structures. An outlier trench, which the Arlington County Board has designated as a local historic district, remains to the southwest of the fort.

== See also ==
- List of Arlington County Historic Districts
