= Daniel J. Flynn =

American author

Daniel J. Flynn is an American author and columnist. He is a senior editor at The American Spectator. He has written for the Los Angeles Times, the Chicago Tribune, the Boston Globe, the New York Post, City Journal, and National Review. He lives in Massachusetts.

Flynn is a former U.S. Marine reservist.

== Books ==
- The Man Who Invented Conservatism: The Unlikely Life of Frank S. Meyer (Encounter Books, 2025)
- Cult City: Jim Jones, Harvey Milk, and 10 days that shook San Francisco (ISI Books, 2018)
- The War on Football: Saving America's Game (Regnery Publishing, 2013)
- Blue Collar Intellectuals: When the Enlightened and the Everyman Elevated America (ISI Books, 2011)
- A Conservative History of the American Left (Penguin Random House, 2008)
- Intellectual Morons: How Ideology Makes Smart People Fall for Stupid Ideas (Penguin Random House, 2004)
- Why the Left Hates America (Penguin Random House, 2002)
