= Mark W. Smith =

American lawyer and writer (born 1968)

Mark Smith
- Born: September 4, 1968 (age 58); Cheverly, Maryland, U.S.
- Education: University of South Carolina (BA); New York University (JD)
- Occupations: Author, Commentator, Lawyer
- Website: www.marksmithlawgroup.com

Mark W. Smith (born September 4, 1968, in Cheverly, Maryland) is the New York Times bestselling author of several books, and the founding partner of a law firm in New York City. Smith is a regular political and legal commentator in the national media and is a former semi-professional baseball player.

Mark is a trial lawyer and conservative writer. He is the author of Official Handbook of the Vast Right-Wing Conspiracy (2004), and of Disrobed: The New Battle Plan to Break the Left's Stranglehold on the Courts (2007).

Graduating from New York University School of Law in 1995, Smith is currently a trial lawyer in private practice in New York City. He has previously served as a public interest lawyer representing a variety of clients (such as a case in 1997 about hair-braiding regulations in New York), many of whom alleged infringements upon their Constitutional rights. He has also been an adjunct professor of law at the University of Kansas Law School, where he taught a course on American laws with respect to firearms ownership, and clerked for a federal judge.

== Early life and education ==
Smith was born in Maryland and raised in Vermont. He played semi-professional baseball in the Northern League for the Saxtons River Pirates as an infielder. After spending three years at the University of Vermont, Smith went on to receive a bachelor's degree in Economics in 1992 from the University of South Carolina where he studied with Robert W. Clower, the former Managing Editor of the American Economic Review and Rhodes Scholar.

After graduating from the New York University School of Law (J.D.) in 1995, Smith clerked for D. Brook Bartlett, Chief Judge, United States District Court for the Western District of Missouri.

== Career ==
Upon the completion of his clerkship, Smith joined Skadden, Arps, Slate, Meagher & Flom LLP in New York City. Smith co-founded the law firm of Smith Valliere PLLC, in 2007.

In 2008, Smith served as lead trial counsel in a jury trial in New York City on behalf of large private MRI medical practice against over 50 insurance companies.

Smith is also the author of The Official Handbook of the Vast Right-Wing Conspiracy: The Arguments You Need to Defeat the Looney Left and Disrobed: The New Battle Plan to Break the Left's Stranglehold on the Courts.

Smith has appeared as a national radio personality in many major media markets, including on radio outlets such as Clear Channel Communications, XM Radio, Sirius Radio, WABC (New York), Fox News Radio, KRLA (Los Angeles), WRKO (Boston), America's Talk Satellite Network (Florida), WKAT (Miami), WIND (Chicago) KNTS (San Francisco), KSKY (Dallas), KLUP (San Antonio), KPIT (Pittsburgh), KNTP (Philadelphia), WITH (Baltimore) and Salem Communications.

In March 2009, Smith hosted a charity event for the Humane Society of New York at the Hudson Terrace in New York City.

== Bibliography ==
- The Official Handbook of the Vast Right-Wing Conspiracy. Washington, D.C.: Regnery, 2004. ISBN 0-89526-085-9.
- Disrobed: The New Battle Plan to Break the Left's Stranglehold on the Courts. New York: Three Rivers Press. ISBN 0-307-33925-4.
- #Duped: How the Anti-gun Lobby Exploits the Parkland School Shooting—and How Gun Owners Can Fight Back. New York: Bombardier Books, 2018. ISBN 978-1642930115.
- First They Came for the Gun Owners: The Campaign to Disarm You and Take Your Freedoms. New York: Bombardier Books, 2020. ISBN 978-1642938289.
- Disarmed: What the Ukraine War Teaches Americans About the Right to Bear Arms. New York: Bombardier Books, 2023. ISBN 978-1637589236.
