= Steve Kangas =

Steve Kangas (Steven Robert Esh, May 11, 1961 – February 8, 1999) was an American journalist, political activist and chess teacher known for his website Liberalism Resurgent and highly political Usenet postings. His stay in Berlin turned him from a conservative into an outspoken liberal. His writings were sharply critical of the business propaganda of the overclass and the CIA. Kangas became increasingly fascinated with capitalists and began voicing his opinions and theories across the internet.

== Death ==
On February 8, 1999, Kangas was found dead from a self-inflicted gunshot wound in a restroom on the 39th floor of the One Oxford Center, Pittsburgh, home to the offices of Richard Mellon Scaife. Kangas’ blood alcohol was 0.14 and his backpack contained 47 rounds of ammunition and a copy of Hitler's Mein Kampf.
