= Reed Irvine =

American economist and activist (1922–2004)

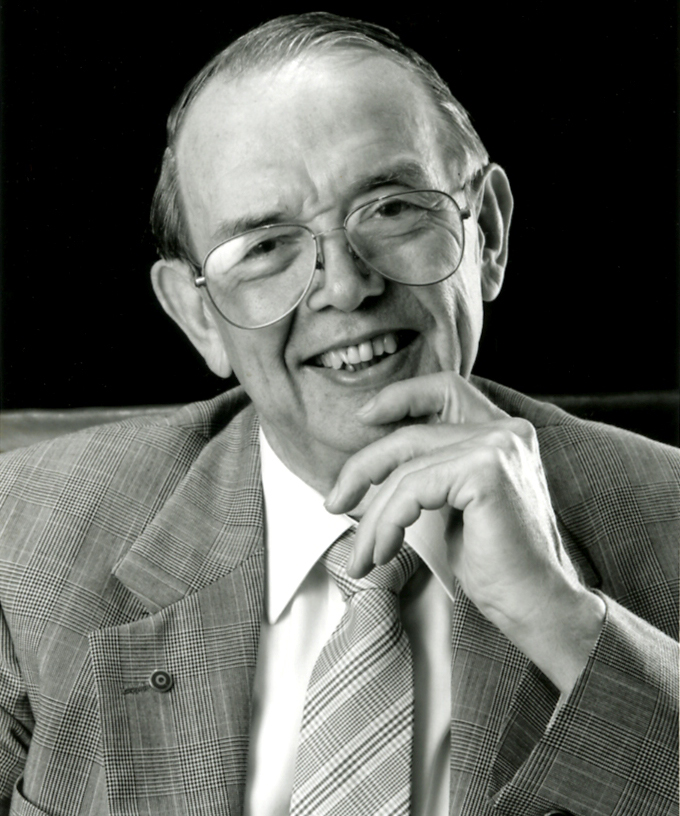
- Born: Reed John Irvine; September 29, 1922; Salt Lake City, Utah, U.S.
- Died: November 16, 2004 (aged 82); Rockville, Maryland, U.S.
- Education: University of Utah (BA); University of Oxford (BA)
- Spouse: Kay Araki Irvine
- Children: 1

Reed Irvine (September 29, 1922 – November 16, 2004) was an American economist and activist who founded the conservative media watchdog organization Accuracy in Media, and remained its head for 35 years. Irvine was motivated by his belief that established news media from the dominant television news media to large city newspaper reporting was colored and biased in favor of a liberal perspective. He became concerned that this dominant perspective was shaping the way the dominant media reported foreign news and events.

Notable commentaries focused on the Salvadoran Civil War, the Persian Gulf War, and the Clinton administration.

== Early life and education ==
Reed John Irvine was born in Salt Lake City on Sept. 29, 1922, the son of William J. and Edna May Irvine. He graduated from the University of Utah in 1942, and served as a Japanese interpreter-translator on Saipan, Tinian, and Okinawa, with a commission in the U.S. Marine Corps during World War II. After the war he received a Fulbright scholarship to the University of Oxford, where he earned another bachelor's degree in economics.

== Career ==
During the El Salvador Civil War, he criticized reporter Raymond Bonner with particular regard to his reporting in the New York Times of the El Mozote massacre. He devoted an entire edition of the AIM Report to Bonner, reporting that "Mr. Bonner had been worth a division to the communists in Central America." In 1992, as part of the peace settlement established by the Chapultepec Peace Accords, the United Nations-sanctioned Truth Commission for El Salvador investigating human rights abuses committed during the war supervised the exhumations of the El Mozote remains by an Argentinian team of forensic specialists. The Commission stated in its final report: "There is full proof that on 11 December 1981, in the village of El Mozote, units of the Atlácatl Battalion deliberately and systematically killed a group of more than 200 men, women and children, constituting the entire civilian population that they had found there the previous day and had since been holding prisoner" and "More than 500 identified victims perished at El Mozote and in the other villages. Many other victims have not been identified." Bonner's reporting suggested the total might be higher, citing the Human Rights Commission of El Salvador, but it noted that it was "not possible for an observer who was not present at the time of the massacre to determine independently how many people died or who killed them."

During the Persian Gulf War in 1991, he accused CNN of airing "Saddam Hussein's version of the truth."

== Personal life ==
He had been married to Kay Araki Irvine for 57 years at the time of his death. They had one son, Don Irvine, who's continuing the legacy as the Publisher of Accuracy in Media.

== Awards ==
- George Washington medal, Freedoms Foundation at Valley Forge, 1980
- In 1987 Irvine received an Ethics in Journalism award from the World Media Association, a group founded in 1978 by Sun Myung Moon of the Unification Church. In 1994, Irvine said about the conservative Washington Times, founded by Unification Church leader Sun Myung Moon: "The Washington Times is one of the few newspapers in the country that provides some balance."

== Legacy ==
According to Michael T. Kaufman, Irvine's "Accuracy in Media" "paved the way for the tide of conservative talk shows, Web sites and news programming that would follow decades later." According to Alex S. Jones of the Shorenstein Center on Media, Politics and Public Policy at Harvard's Kennedy School of Government, "...AIM really was the fountainhead of the effort to denounce the liberal media, and create the image of the mainstream media as very liberal..."

In 1993, Irvine wrote The News Manipulators: Why You Can't Trust the News, with A. I. M. investigator Cliff Kincaid and Joseph C. Goulden, ISBN 0962505315.
