= Christopher Ruddy =

American journalist

- Born: January 28, 1965 (age 61); Mineola, New York, U.S.
- Education: St. John's University, New York (BA); London School of Economics (MPP)

Christopher Ruddy (born January 28, 1965) is an American business executive and former journalist. A political conservative, Ruddy is the CEO and majority owner of Newsmax Media.

== Background ==
Ruddy grew up on Long Island in Williston Park, New York, where his father was a police officer in Nassau County. He graduated from Chaminade High School in Mineola, New York before graduating summa cum laude with a degree in history from St. John's University, New York in 1987. He earned a master's degree in public policy from the London School of Economics and also studied at the Hebrew University of Jerusalem as an undergrad. He worked briefly as a bilingual high school social studies teacher in the Bronx, New York. Ruddy holds an Honorary Doctorate of Letters from St. John's University.

In 2012, the Los Angeles Times published an article entitled "Race and the liberation of Dachau" by Elliott Perlman, who interviewed the daughter of a Polish Jewish survivor of Dachau, and based on her evidence, her father himself. Her father confirmed, as an eyewitness to the liberation of Dachau, what Paul Parks had described in the documentary that Ruddy had claimed to be without evidence. Ruddy then moved to the New York Post, which he joined as an investigative reporter late in the summer of 1993. After initially writing about abuse of Social Security disability benefits, he focused on the Whitewater scandal involving then-president Bill Clinton.

In 1995, Ruddy joined the Pittsburgh Tribune-Review as a national correspondent covering the Clinton White House and other topics.

Ruddy has studied as a Media Fellow with the Hoover Institution. Ruddy serves on the board of directors of the Financial Publishers Association (FIPA), an industry trade group whose goal is "to share knowledge of best business practices to help our members' publications grow and prosper, while empowering readers with unbiased, independent information".

Ruddy is a member of the International Council, chaired by Henry Kissinger, at the CSIS, a bipartisan Washington, D.C. think tank focused on national security and foreign affairs. Ruddy also served as a representative on the U.S. delegation headed by Senators Joseph Lieberman and Lindsey Graham to the NATO 44th Munich Security Conference.

In 2010, Britain's Daily Telegraph ranked Ruddy as one of the "100 Most Influential Conservatives" in the U.S. The paper said: "Chris Ruddy is an increasingly powerful and influential player in the conservative media and beyond."

From 2009 to 2013, Ruddy served on the board of directors of the American Swiss Foundation, a nonprofit organization that fosters relations between the two countries. In 2015, he was elected to the board of directors of the Zweig Fund and the Zweig Total Return Funds, two New York Stock Exchange-traded closed-end funds managed by Virtus.

Ruddy has been both a "Patron" and a "Sustaining Donor" to the Wikimedia Foundation. He is an alumnus of the American Swiss Foundation.

== Newsmax ==
Following Ruddy's work at the Pittsburgh Tribune-Review, he started Newsmax with the owner of the Tribune-Review, Richard Mellon Scaife, and a $25,000 investment in 1998. They raised $15 million from 200 private investors, whom they subsequently bought out (in 2000). Ruddy then owned a 60 percent stake, with the rest owned by Scaife as a silent partner. Richard Scaife died in 2014 at the age of 82.

Newsmax now trades as NMAX on the New York Stock Exchange, after its initial public offering on March 31, 2024. The stock had an IPO price of $10 and rose over 700% on its first day of trading—the best-performing public debut since 2022. Newsmax's stock subsequently dropped 77.5% on April 2, which prompted financial commentators to label Newsmax as a meme stock.

== Journalism ==
New York Post editor Eric Breindel recommended Ruddy for a job at the Pittsburgh Tribune-Review owned by Richard Mellon Scaife. In November 1994, Ruddy was hired to investigate the story full-time by the Tribune-Review. In between Ruddy's departure from the Post and joining the Tribune-Review, he put out a report through the Western Journalism Center criticizing the Fiske investigation as inadequate. With the help of Scaife, the Center took out full-page ads in major newspapers to promote the report (Scaife gave $330,000 to the Center in 1994–95 before ending his support).

Ruddy's discussion of questions regarding the death of White House counsel Vince Foster drew mixed reactions. Ruddy claimed that Park Police had staged the scene of Foster's death as described in their reports. One of the officers named by Ruddy sued him along with the Western Journalism Center, seeking $2 million in damages for libel. The suit was dismissed because Ruddy had said nothing libelous "of and concerning the officer."

Ruddy later built on his work on the Foster case for his book The Strange Death of Vincent Foster. In reviewing the book for The New York Times, Richard Brookhiser of the National Review called it "the St. Mark version of the gospel of the Foster cover-up: a plain narrative of the perceived failings of the official investigation, with minimal speculation." Shortly after the book came out, Fiske's successor as independent counsel, Kenneth Starr, released his report from the third investigation into Foster's death. Starr also concluded that Foster had died by suicide.

Ruddy ended his investigative reporting after founding Newsmax, but continues to write an occasional blog while he shapes overall editorial policy. He told Jeremy Peters of The New York Times that his outlets provide "news that Americans in the heartland would like to see."

== Politics ==
Ruddy describes himself as a libertarian conservative and "Reaganite", although he is not registered as a Republican.

Throughout his career, Ruddy has often staked out positions at variance with the Republican Party. For example, Ruddy broke with the Bush administration on the Iraq War, and was one of the first conservatives to do so. "I came out very strongly against the war in Iraq when it wasn't in vogue, back in 2004," Ruddy told The Palm Beach Post. "I lost some subscribers. But we are close to spending a trillion dollars on the war and there is no exit strategy," he added. "Lots of Republicans and conservatives are not that gung-ho on the war anymore and I think we broke the ice."

=== Bill Clinton ===
The Palm Beach Post interview also noted that Ruddy, disenchanted by the war and runaway federal spending under Bush, re-evaluated the Clinton years and offered a kinder view of the administration he once criticized. Compared with his reporting during Bill Clinton's presidency, Ruddy eventually took a more subdued view to Hillary Clinton's presidential campaign. He said she had moderated and no longer generated the same animosity among conservatives. Ruddy told The New York Times he and Scaife had changed their views: "Both of us have had a rethinking. Clinton wasn't such a bad president. In fact, he was a pretty good president in a lot of ways, and Dick feels that way today."

In the fall of 2007, Ruddy published a positive interview with former president Clinton on Newsmax.com, followed by a positive cover story in Newsmax magazine. The New York Times said with reference to the event that politics had made "strange bedfellows."

Newsweek reported Ruddy praised Clinton for his foundation's global work, and explained that the interview, as well as a private lunch he and Scaife had had with Clinton (which Ruddy says was orchestrated by Ed Koch), were due to the shared view of himself and Scaife that Clinton was doing important work representing the U.S. globally while America was the target of criticism. He also said that he and Scaife had never suggested Clinton was involved in Foster's death, nor had they spread allegations about Bill Clinton's sex scandals, although their work may have encouraged others. Ruddy and Scaife again met Clinton for lunch at his office in September 2008. "We had a great time with him," Ruddy said of the meeting. He added, "We consider Bill Clinton a friend and he considers us friends." Forbes indicated the relationship between Ruddy and Clinton has continued and described them as "lunch chums."

During a 2010 campaign swing through Florida, President Clinton departed from his schedule to make a visit to Newsmax's offices in West Palm Beach. After a private meeting with Ruddy, Clinton toured Newsmax's offices and met with its staff.

A May 2009 Sunday magazine profile in The New York Times on the former president, "The Mellowing of William Jefferson Clinton," offered more details of the relationship between Ruddy and Clinton. The Arkansas Times said details about the friendship between Ruddy and Clinton in The New York Times profile was the "most amazing revelation" of their profile of the former president. Ruddy told the Times though he remained a "Reagan conservative", he had re-evaluated the Clinton presidency and suggested he had earned high marks as president for success in ending welfare, keeping government in check, and supporting free trade. Ruddy also noted that the Clinton Foundation was doing remarkable work globally.

In July 2012, Ruddy was a member of the official delegation that accompanied President Clinton on his five-nation tour of Africa, reviewing Clinton Foundation initiatives in the area of health care, HIV/AIDS programs, education, and poverty alleviation.

During the delegation's visit to Maputo, Mozambique, Ruddy blogged for the Clinton Foundation website, "The Clinton Foundation demonstrates that public-private partnerships and strategic engagement of private citizens, community members, and local governments can achieve great results in health care. And as I saw firsthand today in Mozambique, this work is innovative in its scope and in its purpose – which is to ensure governments can own and maintain their own health care systems without further reliance on aid. I applaud the Clinton Foundation for bringing together groups and individuals from all sides of the political spectrum to build a world that's more equal, more sustainable, and that benefits us all."

=== Donald Trump ===
Ruddy is a confidant of Donald Trump. While speaking with Politico, he addressed the occurrence of significant tweets from the President on Friday nights and Saturdays. Ruddy said, "He understands the news cycle. ... It's an opportunity to get out news on a Saturday, when other news organizations aren't pushing too much new. He realizes that Saturday is a free media day for him." The story described Ruddy as a Mar-a-Lago member and longtime friend of Trump's.

On June 12, 2017, Ruddy claimed that Trump met with Robert Mueller to offer him the job of FBI Director just days before it was announced that he would be appointed special counsel for the Russian investigation. Ruddy did not provide any proof of this. He also claimed in the same interview that Trump was considering terminating Mueller's position as special prosecutor. However, it was not clear if this was based on Trump's comments or the comments of his lawyer made during the previous week.

=== Joe Biden ===
In July 2021, Ruddy published an op-ed via Newsmax that praised President Joe Biden for his efforts to prioritize the rollout of COVID-19 vaccines in the United States, stating that he "inherited an effective vaccine from President Donald Trump, took it into his arms, and ran with it", and that "for the moment, we as Americans can applaud President Biden's success with the vaccine rollout. It is saving countless lives — and that is a good thing." The op-ed, however, came amid criticism of the Newsmax TV channel for having aired an interview with anti-vaccination advocate Peter A. McCullough.

== Publications ==
Books

- Vincent Foster: The Ruddy Investigation (United Publishing Company, 1996)
- The Strange Death of Vincent Foster: An Investigation (Free Press, Simon & Schuster, 1997. ISBN 0-684-83837-0.)
- Bitter Legacy: NewsMax Reveals the Untold Story of the Clinton-Gore Years (NewsMax Media, 2002. ISBN 0-9716807-3-6.)

== See also ==
- New Yorkers in journalism
