= Gene Lyons =

American political columnist (born 1943)

Gene Lyons (born September 20, 1943) is an American political columnist who has defended President Bill Clinton.

== Writing ==
He and Joe Conason co-authored The Hunting of the President: The 10 Year Campaign to Destroy Bill and Hillary Clinton, a documentary book published in 2000, with a supporting film. The book outlines a purported right-wing campaign waged against President of the United States Bill Clinton leading eventually to the president's impeachment because he lied under oath about having extramarital sexual relations with a White House intern. It extends the discussion in Lyons' 1996 book Fools for Scandal: How the Media Invented Whitewater.

A winner of the 1980 National Magazine Award for Public Service for the Texas Monthly article “Why Teachers Can’t Teach”, he was an associate editor at Texas Monthly in 1981, and General Editor at Newsweek from 1982 to 1986. He has written hundreds of articles, essays and reviews for such magazines as Harper’s, The New York Times Magazine, The New York Review of Books, Washington Monthly, The Nation, Esquire, Slate, and Salon. His other books include The Higher Illiteracy (University of Arkansas, 1988) and Widow’s Web (Simon & Schuster, 1993).

Lyons writes a column for the Arkansas Times that is syndicated nationally by Andrews McMeel Syndication.

== Personal ==
Lyons is a native of Elizabeth, New Jersey. He graduated from Rutgers in 1965, and earned a Ph.D. in English from the University of Virginia in 1969. He taught at the University of Massachusetts Amherst, University of Arkansas and University of Texas before becoming a full-time writer in 1976.

He has written that he "live[s] differently from most political writers: on a gravel road in a rural county with no stoplights, probably more cows than people, and that voted 2-to-1 for McCain/Palin".

He is not related to character actor Gene Lyons.
