= Richard Mellon Scaife =

American Mellon family heir, and newspaper owner (1932–2014)

- Born: July 3, 1932; Pittsburgh, Pennsylvania, U.S.
- Died: July 4, 2014 (aged 82); Pittsburgh, Pennsylvania, U.S.
- Education: University of Pittsburgh (BA)
- Employer: Owner of Pittsburgh Tribune-Review
- Known for: Conservative political involvement Newspaper owner Mellon family heir
- Political party: Republican
- Spouses: Frances L. Gilmore (m. 1956; div. 1991); Margaret "Ritchie" Battle (m. 1991; div. 2012)
- Children: 2
- Parent: Sarah Mellon
- Relatives: Cordelia Scaife May (sister)
- Website: www.scaife.com

Richard Mellon Scaife (/skeɪf/; July 3, 1932 – July 4, 2014) was an American billionaire, a principal heir to the Mellon banking, oil, and aluminum fortune, and the owner and publisher of the Pittsburgh Tribune-Review. In 2005, Scaife was number 238 on the Forbes 400, with a personal fortune of $1.2 billion. By 2013, Scaife had dropped to number 371 on the listing, with a personal fortune of $1.4 billion.

During his life, Scaife provided financial support to conservative public policy organizations over four decades. He provided support for conservative and libertarian causes in the United States, mostly through the private, nonprofit foundations he controlled: the Sarah Scaife Foundation, Carthage Foundation, and Allegheny Foundation, and until 2001, the Scaife Family Foundation, now controlled by son David.

== Early life ==
Scaife was born in Pittsburgh, Pennsylvania, to Alan Magee Scaife, the head of an affluent Pittsburgh family, and Sarah Cordelia Mellon, who was a member of the influential Mellon family, one of the most powerful families in the country. Sarah was the niece of former United States Secretary of the Treasury Andrew W. Mellon. She and her brother, financier R.K. Mellon, were heirs to the Mellon fortune that included Mellon Bank and major stakes in Gulf Oil and Alcoa aluminum.

Scaife attended high school at Deerfield Academy in Deerfield, Massachusetts where he almost didn't graduate after getting caught drinking off campus at the age of 14. He was expelled from Yale University in the aftermath of a drunken party in which he launched an empty beer keg down a flight of stairs, injuring a classmate. Yale gave him the opportunity to repeat his freshman year, but he continued to skip class and flunked out. With the help of his father, who was chairman of the board of trustees, he attended the University of Pittsburgh and graduated with a bachelor's degree in English in 1957.

Scaife inherited positions on several corporate boards in 1958 when his father Alan died unexpectedly. However, his family had become estranged from his uncle, R. K. Mellon, who retained control of the companies. His mother encouraged him to get involved in the family's philanthropic foundations, and he did so. (See management of Scaife family foundations.) He inherited much of the Mellon fortune when his mother died in 1965.

A portion of the fortune was placed in trust funds and the rest in foundations. The trusts expired in 1985 and, per tax law, the foundations must give away 5% of their assets per year. Disbursements from each foundation are done through boards of directors.

In 1973, he became estranged from his sister Cordelia and he took control of many of the family foundations while Cordelia supported her own charities, including Planned Parenthood and the National Aviary in Pittsburgh. Shortly before her death, the siblings reconciled, and he eulogized her in January 2005, lauding Cordelia for devoting her life and resources to "worthwhile causes".

== Business ==
=== Purchase of the Tribune-Review ===
In 1970, Scaife purchased a small market newspaper, then known as the Tribune-Review. The paper was based in Greensburg, the county seat and center of Westmoreland County, located about 30 miles southeast of Pittsburgh. For a number of years, the paper was published and distributed only in the Westmoreland area.

Scaife made headlines in the fall of 1973 when a Tribune-Review reporter was fired for making the remark "one down and one to go" during the Watergate era when Vice President Spiro T. Agnew resigned over corruption charges dating back to his days as governor of Maryland. In the controversy that followed nearly half the paper's 24 person newsroom staff resigned. In 1992, the two main newspapers in Pittsburgh were embroiled in a lengthy labor dispute that ultimately led the larger paper, the Pittsburgh Press, to cease operations, and for the remaining paper, the Pittsburgh Post-Gazette, to suspend publication for nearly six months until the Post-Gazette acquired the Press late that year.

During this time, Scaife expanded operations of his newspaper into Pittsburgh. He essentially created a newspaper from the ground up and named it the Pittsburgh Tribune-Review while maintaining the Greensburg operation separately. He moved the Pittsburgh headquarters to the D. L. Clark building on Martindale Street on Pittsburgh's North Side.

=== Leadership and media interests ===
The Pittsburgh Tribune-Review continues to challenge the Post-Gazette in the Pittsburgh media market. Twelve years after Scaife's newspaper began publishing, the Post-Gazette reported major financial losses, and the unions representing its employees agreed to wage concessions to keep it afloat. Unlike Scaife, the owners of the Post-Gazette, the Block family, were unwilling to sustain major losses year after year. According to the Scaife divorce papers, Richard Scaife has consistently spent between $20 and $30 million per year to cover the Tribune-Review's losses. According to the Audit Bureau of Circulation, the Tribune-Review has a combined 221,000 regional circulation, about 7,000 subscribers fewer than its competitor.

In 2005, the Pittsburgh Tribune-Review announced that operations of its suburban editions would be consolidated, with "staff reductions" in the newsrooms, business, and circulation departments. Two managers were laid off immediately along with several other staff members later in 2005.

With Scaife as publisher, the small circulation newspaper was the chief packager of editorials and news columns claiming that then United States President Bill Clinton or his wife, then First Lady Hillary Clinton were responsible for the death of Deputy White House counsel Vince Foster. Scaife paid freelancer Christopher Ruddy to write about the Foster case for the Tribune-Review and other right-leaning media. Special Prosecutor Ken Starr, appointed to investigate Clinton, concluded Foster had, in fact, committed suicide.

In 2004, Scaife was reported to own 7.2 percent of Newsmax Media, a news-based Web site with conservative political content founded by Ruddy in 1998. In 2009, Scaife reportedly controlled 42% of NewsMax, with Ruddy the 58% majority owner, CEO and editor.

Scaife owned a majority interest in Pittsburgh-based all-news radio station KQV.

From 1977 to 1989 Scaife owned the Sacramento Union newspaper in the state capital of Sacramento, California.

== Political activities ==
According to his unpublished memoir, Scaife was motivated by concerns that the general trend towards liberalism in America would lead not just to inferior public policy but to the annihilation of American civilization.

While Scaife was not known for describing to others the motives or aims of his many contributions, in his book he tells of how he and a network of other influential conservatives called themselves "The League to Save Carthage", the name chosen because they believed the threat of political progressivism was so dire it could not even be compared to the decline of Rome in the face of barbarians. Rather the situation was closer to Ancient Carthage, which had been totally obliterated by Rome, a defeat Scaife and his fellow conservatives attributed to the passivity of its elites in the face of the enemy.

=== Support for Richard Nixon ===
As early as 1968, Scaife was actively involved at the highest levels of the Nixon campaign. He was appointed to lead the United Citizens for Nixon-Agnew during the fall of 1968.

Scaife gained notoriety for evading weak campaign finance laws to donate US$990,000 to the 1972 re-election campaign of U.S. President Richard M. Nixon. Scaife was not charged with a crime, but about $45,000 went to a fund linked to the Watergate scandal. Scaife later said he was repulsed by the scandal and refused to speak with Nixon after 1973. Following Robert Duggan's suicide and then Watergate, he shifted his political giving from politicians' campaigns to anti-communist research groups, legal defense funds, and publications. During the scandal, John Ehrlichman suggested having Scaife buy out The Washington Post in a hostile takeover from Katharine Graham in order to halt Bob Woodward and Carl Bernstein's reporting.

=== Opposition to Bill Clinton ===
Scaife's publications were substantially involved in coverage against then-President Bill Clinton:

- Scaife was the major backer of The American Spectator, whose Arkansas Project set out to find facts about Clinton and in which Paula Jones' accusations of sexual harassment against Clinton were first widely publicized.
- On April 15, 1998, The New York Times revealed that Scaife had spent nearly $2 million on the project.
- In a 1999 series of articles on Scaife and foundations that support conservative causes, The Washington Post named a close Scaife associate, Richard Larry, and not Scaife himself as the man who drove the Arkansas Project, while also acknowledging that Scaife was still the project's lead financier. The question of how political intellectualism was centered in the subject or in his key aides, such as Richard Larry, R. Daniel McMichael, or others, remains an open question.

The project not only accused Clinton of financial and sexual indiscretions (some later verified, others not), but also gave root to conspiracist notions that the Clintons collaborated with the CIA to run a drug smuggling operation out of the town of Mena, Arkansas and that Clinton had arranged for the murder of White House aide Vince Foster as part of a coverup of the Whitewater scandal. The possibility that money from the project had been given to former Clinton associate David Hale, a witness in the Whitewater investigation, led to the appointment of Michael J. Shaheen as a special investigator. Shaheen subpoenaed Scaife, who testified before a federal grand jury in the matter.

In the fall of 2007, however, Ruddy published a positive interview with former President Clinton on Newsmax, followed by a positive cover story in the magazine. The New York Times noted with reference to the event that politics had made "strange bedfellows".

Newsweek reported that Ruddy praised Clinton for his Foundation's global work, and explained that the interview, as well as a private lunch he and Scaife had had with Clinton, which Ruddy says was orchestrated by Ed Koch, were due to his shared view, with Scaife that Clinton was doing important work representing the U.S. globally while America was the target of criticism. He also said that he and Scaife had never suggested Clinton was involved in Foster's death, nor had they spread allegations about Clinton's sex scandals, although their work may have encouraged others.

Despite his political opposition to Clinton, the two men forged a friendship after Clinton left office. They became so close that Clinton spoke at a private memorial service for Scaife on August 2, 2014.

=== Political donations ===
According to campaignmoney.com, from 1999 through 2006, Scaife, under the name "R. Scaife", made ten contributions of over $200 to political campaigns, for a total of $19,000. Under the name "R.M. Scaife", he made four donations totaling $22,000. Under the name "Richard Scaife", he made 23 donations over this period which totaled $142,904. Besides donations to the Republican National Committee and various political campaigns such as Santorum 2000 and the Santorum Victory Committee for Rick Santorum, he has also supported political action committees such as the Pro-Growth Action Team, the Free Congress PAC (formerly: Committee For the Survival Of a Free Congress), and the Club for Growth Inc. PAC. Scaife also funded the Western Journalism Center, headed by Joseph Farah. He was named to the PoliticsPA list of "Pennsylvania's Top Political Activists".

== Philanthropy ==
Scaife gave away an estimated $1 billion plus adjusted for inflation from his family fortune on philanthropy. He estimated that $620 million of this was "aimed at influencing American public affairs". The Washington Post called him "the leading financial supporter of the movement that reshaped American politics in the last quarter of the 20th century." At the same time, according to journalist Jane Mayer, he gave almost no interviews or speeches on his motives and aims", and "rarely spoke with those who ran the institutions he funded".

=== Management of the Scaife family foundations ===
When Scaife refocused his political giving away from individuals and toward anti-communist research groups, legal defense funds, and publications, the first among these was the Hoover Institution on War, Revolution, and Peace at Stanford University.

Through contacts made at Hoover and elsewhere, Scaife became a major, early supporter of The Heritage Foundation, which has since become one of Washington's most influential conservative public policy research institutes. He served as vice-chairman of the Heritage Foundation board of trustees.

Later, he supported such varied conservative and libertarian organizations as:

- American Enterprise Institute
- Atlas Economic Research Foundation
- David Horowitz Freedom Center
- Committee for a Constructive Tomorrow, which advocates for free-market solutions to environmental issues and dissent on anthropogenic global warming
- Commonwealth Foundation for Public Policy Alternatives, a Harrisburg-based libertarian think tank
- Federalist Society
- Foundation for Economic Education
- Free Congress Foundation (headed by Jim Gilmore)
- Freedom House
- GOPAC (headed by Newt Gingrich)
- Independent Women's Forum
- Intercollegiate Studies Institute (which operates the Collegiate Network)
- Judicial Watch
- Landmark Legal Foundation
- The Media Institute
- Media Research Center (headed by Brent Bozell)
- Pacific Legal Foundation
- Reason Foundation

By 1998, his foundations were listed among donors to over 100 such groups, to which he had disbursed some $340 million by 2002.

=== Pepperdine University ===
Scaife also endowed a new school of public policy at Pepperdine University. Independent Counsel Kenneth Starr was named the first dean of this school. Pepperdine has denied any connection between Scaife and the selection of Starr. Starr accepted the post in 1996, but in the ensuing controversy, he gave up the appointment in 1998 before ever having started at Pepperdine. After the investigation, Starr was appointed to head Pepperdine's law school in 2004, and became president of Baylor University in 2010.

=== Other philanthropic support ===
Scaife was identified with his contributions to conservative and libertarian causes. The Washington Post in 1999 dubbed him "funding father of the Right."

However, Scaife supported certain policy research groups which are not explicitly conservative, such as the Center for Strategic and International Studies (CSIS), the National Endowment for Democracy (NED), and the Foreign Policy Research Institute (FPRI), at the University of Pennsylvania, among others. He was also a major donor to abortion rights advocates, including Planned Parenthood, giving "millions" to the organization, although most of the donations ended in the 1970s, according to The Washington Post.

In the late 1990s, Scaife provided more than $1 million to the Corporation for Public Broadcasting, the prime benefactor of the Public Broadcasting Service (PBS). During the height of the Clinton scandals, his donations to restore and beautify the White House led to an invitation by Hillary Clinton for a black-tie celebration. She warmly received him and posed for a photograph on the same day her husband's sex scandal hit the press. Scaife told the New York Post that he appreciated Mrs. Clinton's invitation. "I'm honored", he said, "Lord knows, it's more than I got from [the first] George Bush".

Scaife also supported non-political groups. He was a key benefactor of a number of Pittsburgh-based arts organizations: Pittsburgh Symphony Orchestra, the Sarah Scaife Galleries at the Carnegie Institute of Pittsburgh art museum, the Brandywine Conservancy, the Phipps Conservatory, and the National Gallery of Art in Washington, D.C., as well as Goodwill Industries of Pittsburgh. He and his foundations contributed to Sarah Scaife's favorite causes: population control (e.g. Planned Parenthood), environmental conservation, and hospitals; Jonas Salk developed his polio vaccine in a Sarah Scaife funded laboratory. He also supported a variety of educational institutions, notably the University of Chicago, The Fletcher School of Law and Diplomacy at Tufts University, Carnegie Mellon University, Boston University, the University of Pittsburgh, the University of Rochester, Smith College, Bowling Green State University, and his prep school, Deerfield Academy.

== Personal life ==
Scaife's first marriage was to Frances L. Gilmore. The couple had two children. The couple subsequently divorced.

In June 1991, he married his longtime companion Margaret "Ritchie" Battle who had made the couple active in the social and cultural life of Pittsburgh. The couple subsequently separated, and, on December 27, 2005, the Pittsburgh Police responded to a call placed by Richard Scaife reporting trespassing at Scaife's residence in the prestigious Shadyside section of Pittsburgh. They arrived to find his estranged wife, pounding on doors and peeking in windows of the couple's mansion. Mrs. Scaife refused to leave the property, and was arrested and charged with defiant trespass.

On April 8, 2006, the Tribune-Review published an article describing a fight between Scaife's estranged wife and three of his servants over a dog that Scaife told the New York Daily News his wife had given him. Both newspapers reported that Scaife's servants went to the hospital for scrapes and bruises after the fracas. Scaife later hung a sign on his lawn: "Wife and dog missing – reward for dog". Three days later, on April 11, Scaife confided to a gossip columnist that he and Margaret Scaife planned to divorce and that their marriage began without a prenuptial agreement. The New York Daily News column estimated his vulnerable assets at half of $1.2 billion.

In September 2007, the Post-Gazette and reporter Dennis Roddy found that the Scaife divorce papers, which had been under seal, were available to the public on the Web site of the Allegheny County Prothonotary's office. The Post-Gazette made the divorce papers available in full on its site. The papers include a full list of the possessions Margaret Scaife alleged her husband had taken and was keeping from her.

In addition to his home, he owned houses in Pebble Beach, California; Nantucket, Massachusetts; and Ligonier, Pennsylvania.

He was named to the PoliticsPA list of "Sy Snyder's Power 50" list of influential individuals in Pennsylvania politics in 2002 and 2003.

On May 18, 2014, he announced that his doctors had diagnosed him with an untreatable form of cancer as part of an introspective column in the Tribune-Review.

== Steve Kangas incident ==
On February 8, 1999, former military intelligence specialist and progressive writer Steve Kangas committed suicide less than 60 feet (18 m) from Scaife's office door inside One Oxford Centre in Pittsburgh. He had been a critic of Scaife and believed that Scaife-funded initiatives posed a danger to the nation. Scaife hired Rex Armistead and a reporter from the Tribune-Review to investigate whether or not Kangas had been out to kill Scaife.

== Death ==
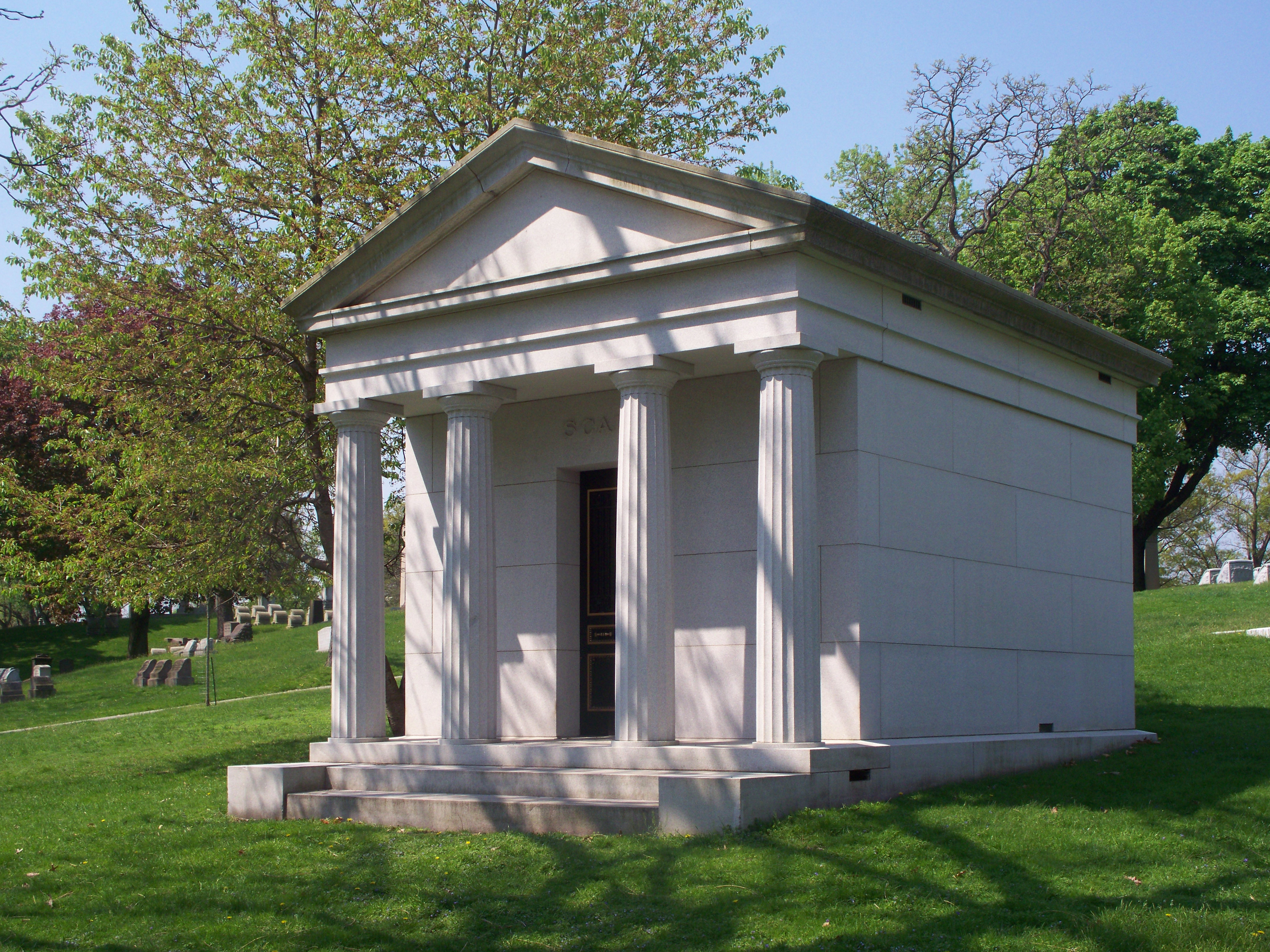
Scaife family mausoleum (1914), Allegheny Cemetery, Pittsburgh, burial place of Richard Mellon Scaife

Scaife died after a battle with cancer on the morning of July 4, 2014, at his home, one day after his 82nd birthday.

== See also ==
- The World's Billionaires
