= Fort Marcy (Virginia) =

Historical fort in Fairfax County, Virginia, United States

- Part of the Civil War defenses of Washington, D.C.
- Fairfax County, Virginia
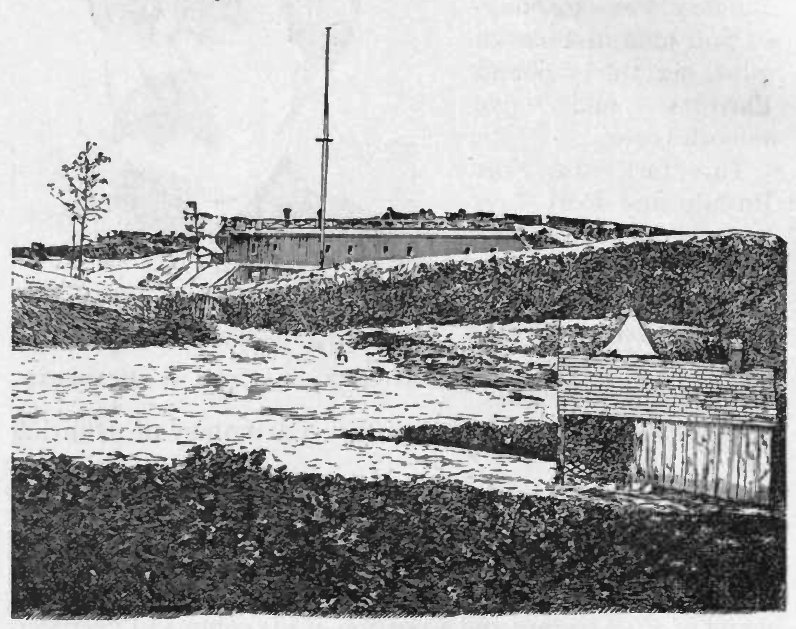
- Fort Marcy as it appeared during the Civil War

Site information
- Type: Earthwork fort
- Controlled by: Union Army
- Condition: Park

Location
- Location within District of Columbia
- Coordinates: 38°56′06″N 77°07′34″W

Site history
- Built: 1861
- Built by: U.S. Army Corps of Engineers
- In use: 1861–1865
- Materials: Earth, timber
- Demolished: 1865
- Battles/wars: American Civil War

Fort Marcy was a Union fortification protecting Washington, D.C. during the American Civil War. Its remains are now administered by the National Park Service as part of the George Washington Memorial Parkway in Fairfax County, Virginia.

== History ==
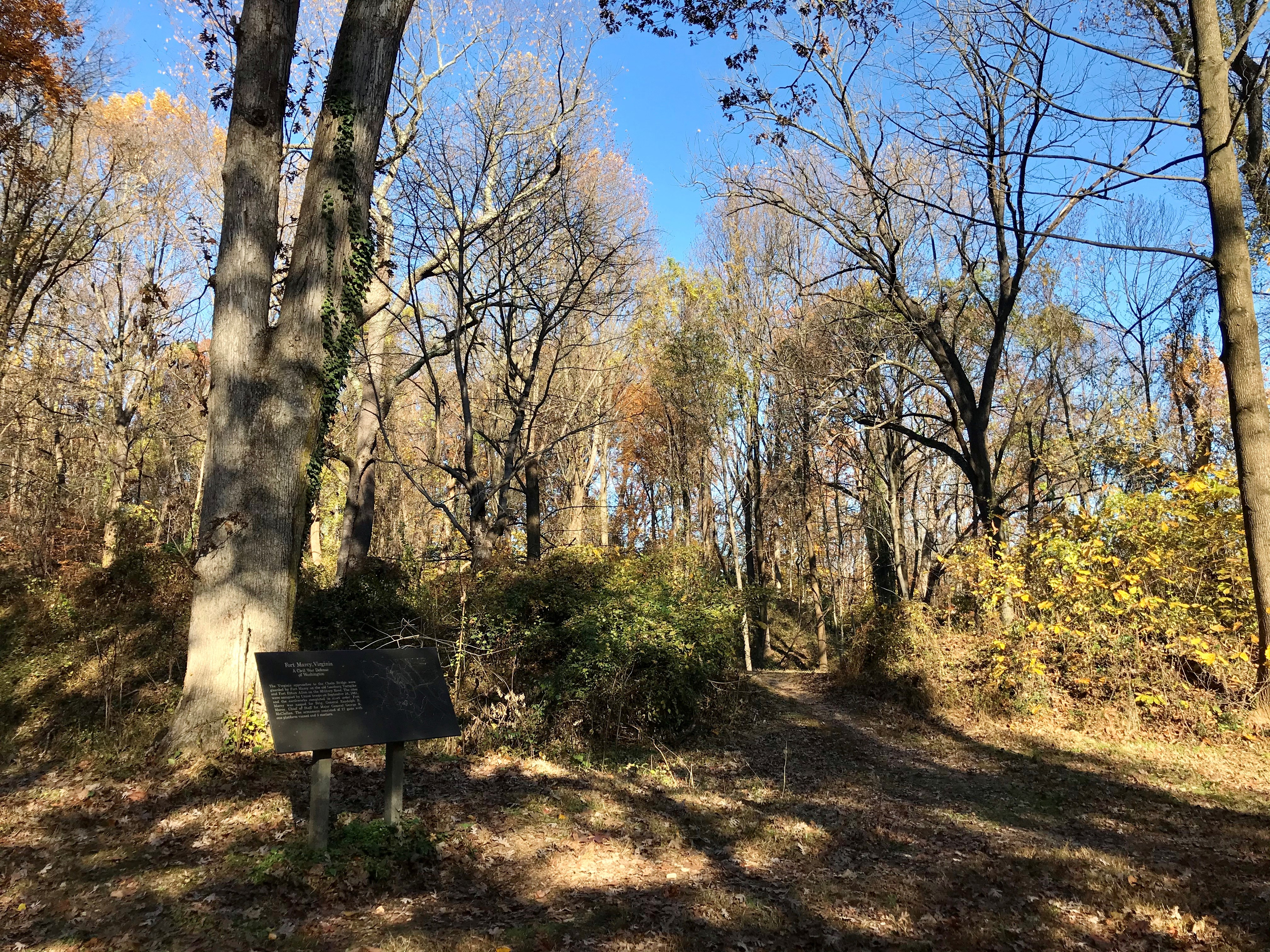
Looking towards Fort Marcy's ramparts, November 2020

Fort Marcy is approximately 1/2 mile (0.80 km) south of the Potomac River on the south side of the Chain Bridge Road leading from Chain Bridge to Langley and McLean, Virginia. By car it can only be reached from the northbound lanes of the George Washington Parkway. The hill on which the fort is located was known as Prospect Hill. It is near the location where the famous but bloodless duel between Henry Clay and John Randolph was fought in 1826.

The perimeter of the fort is 338 feet (103 m). When completed, the fort mounted 18 guns, a 10-inch (25 cm) mortar and two 24-pound (10 kg) Coehorn mortars. The batteries were aimed toward the south and west.

Originally the fort was called Fort Baldy Smith, after General William Farrar Smith, the troops of whose division began construction of the work. His division crossed Chain Bridge on the night of September 24, 1861, and immediately commenced construction of Fort Marcy and Fort Ethan Allen. The 79th New York Highlanders, the 141st Pennsylvania and the Iron Brigade also helped complete the work in the fall of 1862. A force of about 500 contrabands were also employed and the 152nd New York worked on the entrenchments, which are still in a very good state of preservation. The fort was not completed until the fall of 1862.

It is a relatively undisturbed fort and was named in honor of a native of Massachusetts, Randolph B. Marcy, a distinguished soldier, father-in-law and chief of staff to General George B. McClellan. Detachments of the 4th New York and 3rd Pennsylvania Heavy Artillery and the 130th Pennsylvania Infantry were among the troops that performed garrison duty here during the war. An interesting incident of history is that the body of troops which afterwards became famous as the "Iron Brigade" was originated at this fort in the summer of 1861, and was composed of the 19th Indiana, the 2nd, 6th and 7th Wisconsin Regiments. The 24th Michigan was added to the brigade soon after the Battle of South Mountain. These units remained together until the close of the war.

At the end of the Civil War in 1865, the system of fortifications (now known as Fort Circle Parks) which surrounded Washington, D.C. were dismantled. The lumber and other materials were sold at auctions and the land returned to pre-war owners.

=== Modern history ===
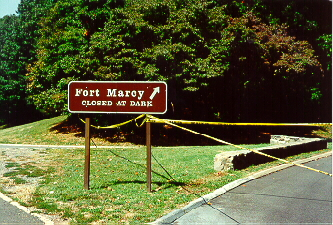
Entrance to Fort Marcy Park, photos and maps

==== Vincent Foster ====
The body of former deputy White House Counsel Vince Foster was found in Fort Marcy Park following his death on July 20, 1993.

==== Kevin Ward ====
The body of Kevin Ward, the mayor of Hyattsville, Maryland, was found in Fort Marcy Park by United States Park Police officers on January 25, 2022, after an apparent suicide. The cause of death was reported to be a gunshot wound.
