= The American Spectator =

Conservative American magazine

- Editor: R. Emmett Tyrrell Jr.
- Categories: Politics
- Founder: George Nathan; Truman Newberry
- First issue: 1967; 59 years ago
- Company: American Spectator Foundation
- Country: United States
- Based in: Alexandria, Virginia, U.S.
- Language: English
- Website: spectator.org
- ISSN: 0148-8414

The American Spectator is a conservative American magazine covering news and politics, edited by R. Emmett Tyrrell Jr. and published by the non-profit American Spectator Foundation. It was founded in 1967 by Tyrrell (the current editor-in-chief) and Wladyslaw Pleszczynski.

The magazine has featured work by several authors such as Malcolm Gladwell, Greg Gutfeld and Dinesh D'Souza. Writers who currently frequently contribute include Daniel Flynn, Paul Kengor, Robert Stacy McCain, Scott McKay, George Neumayr, and George Parry.

It gained popularity in the 1990s during its investigation of Bill Clinton under what became known as its Arkansas Project. During the same period, The American Spectator received a $1.8 million donation from Richard Mellon Scaife. Despite this success, the magazine has not been able to maintain the circulation it reached at the time.

== History ==
The magazine American Spectator is published by the nonprofit media organization American Spectator Foundation. The foundation itself was founded in 1969, with "the stated goal of bringing quality journalism to the forefront of the national political conversation".

The magazine's circulation increased tenfold during the investigation of Bill Clinton and Hillary Clinton under what became known as its "Arkansas Project".

During the 1990s, political commentator Rush Limbaugh gave free promotion of the magazine and paid advertisements on his radio and TV shows, which reached an audience of 20 million.

Following financial shortfalls, and resistance from Tyrell to having the Arkansas Project audited, The American Spectator was sold to George Gilder, leading to layoffs and a relocation to Great Barrington, Massachusetts. Circulation has not returned to the near 300,000 that the magazine saw during its investigation of the Clintons.

In the early 1990s, The American Spectator published two lengthy essays by writer David Brock, "The Real Anita Hill" and the "Troopergate story", both of which alleged inappropriate behavior by then-President Bill Clinton. Brock has since denounced the former article in the 2003 book Blinded by the Right: the Conscience of an Ex-Conservative, in which he states that the article caused the magazine's content to move "away from thoughtful essays and scholarly reviews and humor pieces" to "hit jobs".

=== 21st century ===
In 2011, Assistant Editor Patrick Howley published a piece detailing his infiltration of a protest in Washington, D.C. In the article, Howley asserts his aim to "mock and undermine" the protest against American imperialism, and writes in the first person about his experiences protesting at the National Air and Space Museum. This article, and the methods detailed within, was condemned by The Guardian, The Atlantic's "Atlantic Wire" blog, and The Economist, because they believed the correspondents who worked on the story had conflated journalism and politics. Matt Steinglass of The Economist wrote that Howley "winds up offering a vision of politics as a kind of self-focused performance art, or perhaps (to say the same thing) a version of Jackass."

In September 2020, the American Spectator Foundation filed a lawsuit in federal court against Press Holdings Media Group, a for-profit company that owns the British conservative magazine The Spectator. The lawsuit alleged that Press Holdings used The American Spectator's trademark name and imagery when publishing the Spectator USA website and the U.S. version of its magazine. The Spectator denied the claims. Its chairman, Andrew Neil, noting the 1828 foundation of his own magazine, said of the assertion that The American Spectator had dominion over the word "spectator" in the US: "Given our distinguished history in Britain and America, our worldwide fame as The Spectator Magazine – the oldest in the world – and the prevalence of other magazines with 'spectator' in their titles, we find that claim not only wrong but absurd".

The American Spectator has been criticized for its "hype and hysteria" and "out-of-control screeds that attack the obvious suspects and lack corroboration". The environmental campaigning organization Greenpeace claims that the magazine is part of a "conservative media network with clear Koch influence [that] serves as a reliable platform for attacks on the scientific consensus of global warming".

== Online publication ==
The magazine's final monthly print publication was released in July/August 2014. While The American Spectator did issue a September/October PDF-only version late in mid-November 2014, the masthead still claimed that it was "published monthly, except for combined July/Aug and Jan/Feb issues." A note from Editorial Director Wladyslaw Pleszczynski admitted that "...we have some problems of our own." Pleszczynski added that the issue "was ready for release well over a month ago but for reasons affecting many a print publication these days couldn't be published on actual pages and after considerable delay is now being released in digital form only." Subsequently, online publications have become permanent and available.

The latest editions of the magazine:

- Summer 2021 Magazine "The Biden Economy"
- Winter 2020 Magazine "Liberty in Crisis"
- Summer 2020 Magazine "Make America Great – Yet Again"
- Fall 2019 Magazine "Technical Difficulties"

== Return to print ==
The magazine returned to print in the fall of 2017 under the direction of Hannah Rowan. It is published in the winter and summer.

== Core editorial staff ==
- Editor in Chief: R. Emmett Tyrrell Jr.
- Editorial Director: Wladyslaw Pleszczynski
- Publisher: Melissa Mackenzie
- Managing Editor: Hannah Rowan
- Senior Editors: F. H. Buckley, Daniel J. Flynn, Paul Kengor, George Neumayr, Grover C. Norquist, Ben Stein
- Contributing Editors: Jed Babbin, David Catron, Dov Fischer, Shmuel Klatzkin, Jeffrey Lord, Robert Stacy McCain, George Parry, Arnold Steinberg, Larry Thornberry
