= Clarence Thomas Supreme Court nomination =

1991 US Supreme Court nomination

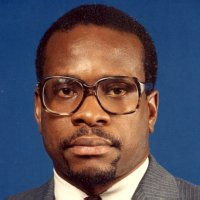
- Official portrait of Clarence Thomas as chairman of the Equal Employment Opportunity Commission
- Nominee: Clarence Thomas
- Nominated by: George H. W. Bush (president of the United States)
- Succeeding: Thurgood Marshall (associate justice)
- Date nominated: July 1, 1991
- Date confirmed: October 15, 1991
- Outcome: Approved by the U.S. Senate

Vote of the Senate Judiciary Committee on motion to report favorably
- Votes in favor: 7
- Votes against: 7
- Result: Motion failed

Vote of the Senate Judiciary Committee on a motion to report without recommendation
- Votes in favor: 13
- Votes against: 1
- Result: Nomination sent to the full Senate without recommendation

Senate confirmation vote
- Votes in favor: 52
- Votes against: 48
- Result: Confirmed

On July 1, 1991, President George H. W. Bush nominated Clarence Thomas for the Supreme Court of the United States to replace Thurgood Marshall, who had announced his retirement. At the time of his nomination, Thomas was a judge on the United States Court of Appeals for the District of Columbia Circuit; President Bush had appointed him to that position in March 1990.

The nomination proceedings were contentious from the start, especially over the issue of abortion. Many women's groups and civil rights groups opposed Thomas based on his conservative political views, just as they had opposed Bush's Supreme Court nominee from the previous year, David Souter.

Toward the end of the confirmation process, sexual harassment allegations against Thomas by Anita Hill, a law professor who had previously worked under Thomas at the United States Department of Education and then at the Equal Employment Opportunity Commission, were leaked to the media from a confidential FBI report. The allegations led to further investigations and a media frenzy about sexual harassment. Televised hearings were re-opened and held by the Senate Judiciary Committee before the nomination was moved to the full, Democratic-controlled Senate for a vote.

On October 15, 1991, Thomas was confirmed to the Supreme Court of the United States by a narrow Senate majority of 52 to 48. He took the oath of office on October 23, 1991.

== Nomination ==
Justice William Brennan stepped down from the Supreme Court in 1990. Thomas was one of five candidates on Bush's shortlist and was the one Bush was most interested in nominating. However, Bush's staff made three arguments against nominating Thomas at the time: Thomas had only served eight months as a judge; Bush could expect to replace Justice Thurgood Marshall with Thomas in due time; and multiple senior advisors told Bush that they did not feel that Thomas was ready. Bush eventually decided to nominate Judge David Souter of the First Circuit instead, who was easily confirmed.

White House Chief of Staff John H. Sununu promised that Bush would fill the next Supreme Court vacancy with a "true conservative" and predicted a "knock-down, drag-out, bloody-knuckles, grass-roots fight" over confirmation. On July 1, 1991, President Bush nominated Judge Clarence Thomas of the District of Columbia Circuit to replace retiring justice Thurgood Marshall, a civil rights icon and the court's first African American justice. When introducing Thomas that day, the president called him "the best person" in the country to take Marshall's place on the court, a characterization belied, according to constitutional law expert Michael Gerhardt, by Thomas's "limited professional distinction, with his most significant legal experiences having been a controversial tenure as chairman of the Equal Employment Opportunity Commission and barely more than one year of experience as a federal court of appeals judge."

In 1992, Gerhardt described the Thomas nomination as "a bold political move calculated to make it more difficult for many of the same civil rights organizations and southern blacks, who opposed Judge Robert Bork's Supreme Court nomination, to oppose Justice Thomas." He also wrote that, "in selecting Justice Thomas, President Bush returned to a practice – nominating extreme ideologues for the Supreme Court – that many hoped had ended with the Senate's rejection of Judge Bork."

Kenneth M. Duberstein (former White House Chief of Staff under Ronald Reagan) and John C. Danforth served as Thomas's "sherpas" (advisors tasked with guiding him through the rigors of their confirmation). Duberstein had previously been a sherpa to Bush's earlier Supreme Court appointee, David Souter, during his nomination process. He had also played a similar advisory role years prior to George Shultz during his confirmation process for United States Secretary of State.

=== Reception ===
Attorney General Richard Thornburgh had previously warned Bush that replacing Thurgood Marshall, who was widely revered as a civil rights icon, with any candidate who was not perceived to share Marshall's views would make the confirmation process difficult; and the Thomas nomination filled various groups with indignation, among them the NAACP, Urban League and the National Organization for Women, who believed he would likely swing the ideological balance on the court to the right. They especially opposed Thomas's appointment because of his criticism of affirmative action and also because they were suspicious of his position on Roe v. Wade.

In the second half of the 20th century, Supreme Court nominees were customarily evaluated by a committee of the American Bar Association (ABA) before being considered by the Senate Judiciary Committee. Anticipating that the ABA would rate Thomas poorly, the White House and Republican Senators pressured the ABA for at least the mid-level "qualified" rating, and simultaneously attempted to discredit the ABA as partisan. (Note: Senior Republicans claimed that while Thomas was well-qualified, the ABA would not support him because they asserted that the ABA had been politicized. The White House attempted to preemptively discredit the ABA as partisan, and Republican Senators threatened to bar the ABA from future participation if it gave Thomas anything less than a "qualified" rating.) Ultimately, on a scale of well-qualified, qualified, or unqualified, 12 members of the Standing Committee on the Federal Judiciary voted that he was "qualified", one abstained, and the other two voted "not qualified", for an overall vote of qualified. This vote represented one of the lowest levels of support for Supreme Court nominees. Although the ABA vote was viewed as a "significant embarrassment to the Bush administration", it ultimately had little impact on Thomas's nomination.

Some of the public statements of Thomas's opponents foreshadowed the confirmation fight that would occur. One such statement came from African-American activist attorney Florynce Kennedy at a July 1991 conference of the National Organization for Women in New York City. Referring to the failure of Ronald Reagan's nomination of Robert Bork, she said of Thomas, "We're going to 'bork' him." The liberal campaign to defeat the Bork nomination served as a model for liberal interest groups opposing Thomas. Likewise, in view of what had happened to Bork, Thomas's confirmation hearings were also approached as a political campaign by the White House and Senate Republicans.

== Judiciary Committee review ==
=== Hearings ===
Public confirmation hearings on the Thomas nomination began on September 10, 1991, and lasted for ten days. The senators' focus as they questioned Thomas and an array of witnesses for and against the nomination was on Thomas's legal views, as expressed in his speeches, writings, and the decisions he had handed down as a federal appeals court judge.

Under questioning, Thomas repeatedly asserted that he had not formulated a position on Roe v. Wade, or had any conversations with anyone regarding the issue.

At one point in the beginning of the proceedings, Senate Judiciary Committee chairman Joe Biden asked Thomas if he believed the Constitution granted any sort of property rights to individuals as described in Richard Epstein's book Takings: Private Property and the Power of Eminent Domain, which had been published by Harvard University Press in 1985. Biden held the book up for Thomas to see and denounced its contents. In his book, Epstein argues that the government should be regarded with the same respect as any other private entity in a property dispute. The Cato Institute later paraphrased Biden's general line of questioning in the hearing as, "Are you now or have you ever been a libertarian?"

=== Committee vote ===
After extensive debate, the Judiciary Committee voted 13–1 on September 27, 1991, to send the Thomas nomination to the full Senate without recommendation. A motion earlier in the day to give the nomination a favorable recommendation had failed 7–7. Anita Hill's sexual harassment allegations against Clarence Thomas became public after the nomination had been reported out from the committee. Up to that time, there had been no public suggestion of inappropriate behavior or misconduct in Thomas's past.

== Sexual harassment allegations ==
On October 6, 1991, after the conclusion of the confirmation hearings, and while the full Senate was debating whether to give final approval to Thomas's nomination, NPR Supreme Court correspondent Nina Totenberg aired information from a leaked Judiciary Committee/FBI report stating that a former colleague of Thomas, University of Oklahoma law school professor Anita Hill, accused him of making unwelcome sexual comments to her when the two worked together at the Department of Education (ED) and then at the Equal Employment Opportunity Commission (EEOC). In the same FBI report, Thomas testified that he had once promoted Allyson Duncan over Hill as his chief of staff at the EEOC.

Shortly after the president selected Thomas as his nominee, democratic committee staffers began hearing rumors that Thomas had sexually harassed one or more women in the past. In early September, committee chairman Joe Biden asked the Bush White House to authorize an FBI investigation into Hill's charges. FBI agents interviewed Hill on September 23, and interviewed Thomas on September 25. Despite the allegations, Biden saw no reason to postpone the committee's scheduled vote on Thomas's nomination.

After Totenberg's story aired, Biden quickly came under pressure to reopen the hearings from House Democratic women and from various groups that had opposed the Thomas nomination earlier in the process. As a result, the final Senate vote on the nomination was postponed and the confirmation hearings were reopened. It was only the third time in the Senate's history that such an action had been taken (and had not been done since 1925, when the nomination of Harlan F. Stone was recommitted to the Judiciary Committee). Amid the resulting frenzy the president declared that he had "total confidence" in Thomas.

=== Anita Hill testimony ===
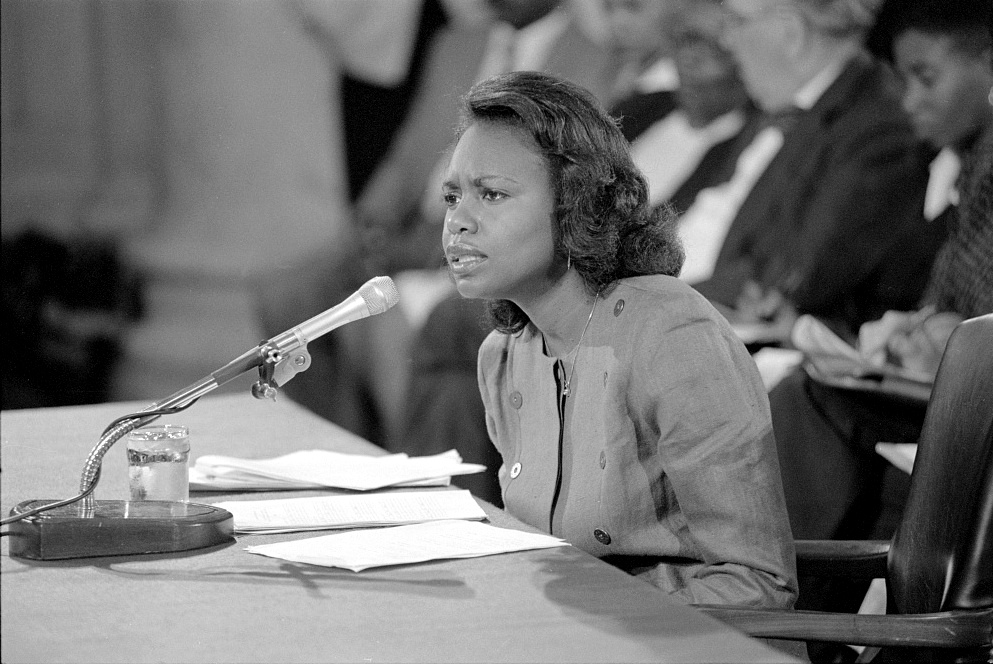
Anita Hill testifying in front of the Senate Judiciary Committee on October 11, 1991

The morning of October 11, 1991, Hill was called to testify during the hearing. She said she was testifying as to the character and fitness of Thomas to serve on the high court and was ambivalent about whether his alleged conduct had in fact risen to the level of being illegal sexual harassment.

Ten years earlier, in 1981, Hill had become an attorney-adviser to Clarence Thomas at the United States Department of Education (ED). When Thomas became chairman of the U.S. Equal Employment Opportunity Commission (EEOC) in 1982, Hill followed Thomas to serve as his special assistant until she resigned in mid-1983. Hill alleged in her 1991 testimony that it was during her employment at ED and EEOC that Thomas made sexually provocative statements.

She testified that she followed Thomas to EEOC because "[t]he work, itself, was interesting, and at that time, it appeared that the sexual overtures ... had ended." She also testified that she wanted to work in the civil rights field, and that she believed that "at that time the Department of Education, itself, was a dubious venture".

Hill provided lurid details about Thomas's alleged inappropriate behavior at the Department of Education: "He spoke about acts that he had seen in pornographic films involving such matters as women having sex with animals and films showing group sex or rape scenes ... On several occasions, Thomas told me graphically of his own sexual prowess ... and made embarrassing references to a porn star by the name of Long Dong Silver". She also said that the following incident occurred later after they had both moved to new jobs at the EEOC: "Thomas was drinking a Coke in his office, he got up from the table at which we were working, went over to his desk to get the Coke, looked at the can and asked, 'Who has put pubic hair on my Coke?'"

=== Statements in support of Hill's allegations ===
Two women, Angela Wright and Rose Jourdain, made statements to Senate staffers in support of Hill. Ultimately, however, Wright and Jourdain were dismissed by the Judiciary Committee without testifying. The reasons why Wright was not called (or chose not to be called) to testify are complex and a matter of some dispute; Republican Senators wanted to avoid the prospect of a second woman describing inappropriate behavior by Thomas, while Democratic Senators were concerned about Wright's credibility and Wright herself was reluctant to testify after seeing the committee's treatment of Hill, including Pennsylvania Senator Arlen Specter stating that he felt Hill's testimony was perjurious in its entirety. During the Thomas nomination proceedings, Wright and Hill were the only people who publicly alleged that then-Judge Thomas had made unsolicited sexual advances, and Hill was the only one who testified to that effect.

Wright, who was one of Thomas's subordinates at the EEOC until he fired her, told Senate Judiciary Committee staff that Thomas had repeatedly made comments to her much like those he allegedly made to Hill, including pressuring her for dates, asking her the size of her breasts, and frequently commenting on the anatomy of other women. Wright said that after she turned down Thomas for a date, Thomas began to express discontent with her work and eventually fired her. Thomas said that he fired Wright for poor performance and for using a homophobic epithet.

Rose Jourdain also did not testify but corroborated Wright's statements, saying Wright had spoken to her about Thomas's statements at the time they were allegedly made. Jourdain stated that Wright had become "increasingly uneasy" around Thomas because of his constant commentary about her body and looks, and that Wright once came to Jourdain's office in tears as a result.

Another former Thomas assistant, Sukari Hardnett, did not accuse Thomas of sexual harassment, but told the Judiciary Committee staff that "if you were young, black, female, reasonably attractive and worked directly for Clarence Thomas, you knew full well you were being inspected and auditioned as a female."

=== Clarence Thomas testimony ===
The afternoon of October 11, 1991, Thomas testified that the accusations against him were false and that, "I deny each and every single allegation against me today that suggested in any way that I had conversations of a sexual nature or about pornographic material with Anita Hill, that I ever attempted to date her, that I ever had any personal sexual interest in her, or that I in any way ever harassed her."

Clarence Thomas also stated that, "This is a case in which this sleaze, this dirt, was searched for by staffers of members of this committee. It was then leaked to the media. And this committee and this body validated it and displayed it in prime time over our entire nation." He called the hearing a "high tech lynching":

This is not an opportunity to talk about difficult matters privately or in a closed environment. This is a circus. It's a national disgrace. And from my standpoint, as a black American, it is a high-tech lynching for uppity blacks who in any way deign to think for themselves, to do for themselves, to have different ideas, and it is a message that unless you kowtow to an old order, this is what will happen to you. You will be lynched, destroyed, caricatured by a committee of the U.S. Senate rather than hung from a tree.

Senator Orrin Hatch asked Thomas his response to Hill's graphic claims inquiring: "[D]id you ever say in words or substance something like there is a pubic hair in my Coke?" and "Did you ever use the term 'Long Dong Silver' in conversation with Professor Hill?" Thomas firmly denied having said either, as well as denying having read The Exorcist, in which the character Burke Dennings says at a party, "There appear[s] to be an alien pubic hair floating around in my gin."

=== Testimony and statements in support of Thomas ===
In addition to Hill and Thomas, the Judiciary heard from several other witnesses over the course of three days, October 11–13, 1991. Several witnesses testified in support of Clarence Thomas and rebutted Hill's testimony. Phone logs were also submitted into the record showing contact between Hill and Thomas in the years after she left the EEOC.

Among those testifying on behalf of then-Judge Thomas was Jane Campa "J.C." Alvarez, a woman who for four years was Thomas's special assistant at EEOC. Alvarez said that "[t]he Anita Hill I knew before was nobody's victim." Alvarez went on to say that Thomas "demanded professionalism and performance." According to Alvarez, Thomas would not tolerate "the slightest hint of impropriety, and everyone knew it." Alvarez asserted that Hill's allegations were a personal move on her part to advance her own interests: "Women who have really been harassed would agree, if the allegations were true, you put as much distance as you can between yourself and that other person. What's more, you don't follow them to the next job – especially, if you are a black female, Yale Law School graduate. Let's face it, out in the corporate sector, companies are fighting for women with those kinds of credentials."

Another witness who testified on behalf of then-Judge Thomas was Nancy Fitch, a special assistant historian to Thomas at EEOC, who said "[t]here is no way" Thomas did what Hill alleged. "I know he did no such thing", she declared. Also Diane Holt, Thomas's personal secretary for six years, said that, "At no time did Professor Hill intimate, not even in the most subtle of ways, that Judge Thomas was asking her out or subjecting her to the crude, abusive conversations that have been described. Nor did I ever discern any discomfort, when Professor Hill was in Judge Thomas's presence." Additionally, Phyllis Berry-Myers, another special assistant to Thomas, said that he "was respectful, demand[ing] of excellence in our work, cordial, professional, interested in our lives and our career ambitions". Berry-Myers said that her "impression" was that Professor Hill desired a greater relationship with Judge Thomas than "just a professional one".

Nancy Altman who worked with Hill and Thomas at the Department of Education testified that, "It is not credible that Clarence Thomas could have engaged in the kinds of behavior that Anita Hill alleges, without any of the women who he worked closest with – dozens of us, we could spend days having women come up, his secretaries, his chief of staff, his other assistants, his colleagues – without any of us having sensed, seen or heard something." Senator Alan K. Simpson was puzzled by why Hill and Thomas met, dined, and spoke by phone on various occasions after they no longer worked together.

== Confirmation vote by the full Senate ==
The Senate voted 52–48 on October 15, 1991, to confirm Thomas as an associate justice of the Supreme Court. In all, Thomas won with the support of 41 Republicans and 11 Democrats, while 46 Democrats and 2 Republicans voted to reject his nomination. As of 2025, Thomas is the most recent Supreme Court justice to be confirmed at a time when majority control of the Senate was held by the opposition party to the president.

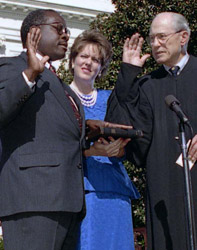
Clarence Thomas being sworn in as a member of the U.S. Supreme Court by Justice Byron White during an October 23, 1991, White House ceremony, as wife Virginia Thomas looks on

Vote to confirm the Thomas nomination
October 15, 1991	Party		Total votes
October 15, 1991	Democratic	Republican	Total votes
Yea	11	41	52
Nay	46	2	48
Result: Confirmed
Roll call vote on the nomination: Senator / Party / State / Vote; Brock Adams / D / Washington / Nay; Daniel Akaka / D / Hawaii / Nay; Max Baucus / D / Montana / Nay; Lloyd Bentsen / D / Texas / Nay; Joe Biden / D / Delaware / Nay; Jeff Bingaman / D / New Mexico / Nay; Kit Bond / R / Missouri / Yea; David Boren / D / Oklahoma / Yea; Bill Bradley / D / New Jersey / Nay; John Breaux / D / Louisiana / Yea; Hank Brown / R / Colorado / Yea; Richard Bryan / D / Nevada / Nay; Dale Bumpers / D / Arkansas / Nay; Quentin Burdick / D / North Dakota / Nay; Conrad Burns / R / Montana / Yea; Robert Byrd / D / West Virginia / Nay; John Chafee / R / Rhode Island / Yea; Dan Coats / R / Indiana / Yea; Thad Cochran / R / Mississippi / Yea; William Cohen / R / Maine / Yea; Kent Conrad / D / North Dakota / Nay; Larry Craig / R / Idaho / Yea; Alan Cranston / D / California / Nay; Al D'Amato / R / New York / Yea; John Danforth / R / Missouri / Yea; Tom Daschle / D / South Dakota / Nay; Dennis DeConcini / D / Arizona / Yea; Alan J. Dixon / D / Illinois / Yea; Chris Dodd / D / Connecticut / Nay; Bob Dole / R / Kansas / Yea; Pete Domenici / R / New Mexico / Yea; David Durenberger / R / Minnesota / Yea; J. James Exon / D / Nebraska / Yea; Wendell Ford / D / Kentucky / Nay; Wyche Fowler / D / Georgia / Yea; Jake Garn / R / Utah / Yea; John Glenn / D / Ohio / Nay; Al Gore / D / Tennessee / Nay; Slade Gorton / R / Washington / Yea; Bob Graham / D / Florida / Nay; Phil Gramm / R / Texas / Yea; Chuck Grassley / R / Iowa / Yea; Tom Harkin / D / Iowa / Nay; Orrin Hatch / R / Utah / Yea; Mark Hatfield / R / Oregon / Yea; Howell Heflin / D / Alabama / Nay; Jesse Helms / R / North Carolina / Yea; Ernest Hollings / D / South Carolina / Yea; Daniel Inouye / D / Hawaii / Nay; Jim Jeffords / R / Vermont / Nay; J. Bennett Johnston / D / Louisiana / Yea; Nancy Kassebaum / R / Kansas / Yea; Bob Kasten / R / Wisconsin / Yea; Ted Kennedy / D / Massachusetts / Nay; Bob Kerrey / D / Nebraska / Nay; John Kerry / D / Massachusetts / Nay; Herb Kohl / D / Wisconsin / Nay; Frank Lautenberg / D / New Jersey / Nay; Patrick Leahy / D / Vermont / Nay; Carl Levin / D / Michigan / Nay; Joe Lieberman / D / Connecticut / Nay; Trent Lott / R / Mississippi / Yea; Richard Lugar / R / Indiana / Yea; Connie Mack III / R / Florida / Yea; John McCain / R / Arizona / Yea; Mitch McConnell / R / Kentucky / Yea; Howard Metzenbaum / D / Ohio / Nay; Barbara Mikulski / D / Maryland / Nay; George J. Mitchell / D / Maine / Nay; Daniel Patrick Moynihan / D / New York / Nay; Frank Murkowski / R / Alaska / Yea; Don Nickles / R / Oklahoma / Yea; Sam Nunn / D / Georgia / Yea; Bob Packwood / R / Oregon / Nay; Claiborne Pell / D / Rhode Island / Nay; Larry Pressler / R / South Dakota / Yea; David Pryor / D / Arkansas / Nay; Harry Reid / D / Nevada / Nay; Donald Riegle / D / Michigan / Nay; Chuck Robb / D / Virginia / Yea; Jay Rockefeller / D / West Virginia / Nay; William Roth / R / Delaware / Yea; Warren Rudman / R / New Hampshire / Yea; Terry Sanford / D / North Carolina / Nay; Paul Sarbanes / D / Maryland / Nay; Jim Sasser / D / Tennessee / Nay; John Seymour / R / California / Yea; Richard Shelby / D / Alabama / Yea; Paul Simon / D / Illinois / Nay; Alan Simpson / R / Wyoming / Yea; Bob Smith / R / New Hampshire / Yea; Arlen Specter / R / Pennsylvania / Yea; Ted Stevens / R / Alaska / Yea; Steve Symms / R / Idaho / Yea; Strom Thurmond / R / South Carolina / Yea; Malcolm Wallop / R / Wyoming / Yea; John Warner / R / Virginia / Yea; Paul Wellstone / D / Minnesota / Nay; Tim Wirth / D / Colorado / Nay; Harris Wofford / D / Pennsylvania / Nay; Sources:

The 99 days that elapsed from the date Thomas's nomination was submitted to the Senate to the date on which the Senate voted whether to approve it was the second longest of the 16 nominees receiving a final vote since 1975, second only to Robert Bork, who waited 108 days. Also, the percentage of senators voting against his confirmation, 48% (48 of 100), was the greatest against a successful nominee since 1881, when 48.9% of senators (23 of 47) voted against the nomination of Stanley Matthews. Vice President Dan Quayle presided over the vote in his role as President of the Senate, prepared to cast a tie-breaking vote if needed for confirmation.

Eight days after winning confirmation, on October 23, Thomas took the prescribed constitutional and judicial (set by federal law) oaths of office, and became the 106th member of the court. He was sworn in by Justice Byron White in a ceremony initially scheduled for October 21, but postponed due to the death of Chief Justice William Rehnquist's wife.

== Cultural impact ==
Public interest in, and debate over, Hill's testimony is said by some to have launched modern-day public awareness of the issue of sexual harassment in the United States. Some people also link this to what is known as the Year of the Woman (1992), when a significant number of liberal women were simultaneously elected to Congress. Some also called these women the "Anita Hill Class".

Michael Isikoff claimed the case influenced the coverage of the allegations of sexual harassment against Bill Clinton in the 1990s.

== Books ==
=== Authors skeptical about Hill's accusations ===
Ken Foskett, an investigative reporter for the Atlanta Journal-Constitution, wrote a book about Justice Thomas in 2004. Foskett concludes that, "Although, it was plausible that Thomas said what Hill alleged, it seems implausible that he said it all in the manner Hill described." Foskett elaborates:

Bullying a woman simply wasn't in Thomas's nature and ran contrary to how he conducted himself around others in a professional environment. And if the context wasn't as Hill alleged, was it fair to turn private conduct into a political weapon to defeat his nomination?

=== Undecided authors ===
Scott Douglas Gerber wrote a book in 1998 about the jurisprudence of Justice Thomas, and came to the following conclusion about the Anita Hill allegations: "Frankly, I do not know whom to believe." Gerber also wryly noted the reaction when an author (David Brock) who had criticized Hill did a U-turn: "the left maintains that it proves that Hill was telling the truth, while the right contends that it simply shows that Brock is an opportunist trying to sell books."

=== Authors supporting Hill's accusations ===
Jane Mayer and Jill Abramson, reporters for The Wall Street Journal, wrote an article for the May 24, 1993, issue of The New Yorker challenging David Brock's assertions. The two authors would later conclude in an investigative book on Thomas that "the preponderance of the evidence suggests" that Thomas lied under oath when he told the committee he had not harassed Hill. Mayer and Abramson say Biden abdicated control of the Thomas confirmation hearings and did not call Angela Wright to the stand. They report that four women traveled to Washington, D.C., to corroborate Anita Hill's claims, including Wright and Jourdain.

According to Mayer and Abramson, soon after Thomas was sworn in, three reporters for The Washington Post "burst into the newsroom almost simultaneously with information confirming that Thomas's involvement with pornography far exceeded what the public had been led to believe." These reporters had eyewitness testimony and video rental records showing Thomas's interest in and use of pornography. However, according to Jeffrey Toobin, because Thomas was already sworn in by the time the video store evidence emerged, The Washington Post dropped the story. The book by Mayer and Abramson was subsequently made into a movie.

Strange Justice was a finalist for the National Book Award in 1994 and received an extraordinary amount of media attention. Conservatives like John O'Sullivan panned the book, while liberals such as Mark Tushnet praised it, saying it established "that Clarence Thomas lied" during the hearings. Richard Roeper of the Chicago Sun-Times called the book character assassination: "I don't care if Clarence Thomas had an inflatable doll on his sofa and a framed autograph from Long Dong Silver on the wall. Just because a man has an immature interest in dirty stuff doesn't mean he harassed anyone."

David Brock wrote an article titled "The Real Anita Hill" for the 1992 The American Spectator magazine and a 1993 book of the same name, arguing against her veracity. In his 2003 book, Blinded by the Right: The Conscience of an Ex-Conservative, he said that he had "lied in print to protect the reputation of Justice Clarence Thomas". He also said that Thomas had used an intermediary to give him personal details on a woman who had corroborated Hill's accusations to make her retract her statement. Brock's 2003 book has an entire chapter (Chapter 5) devoted to describing his experience writing "The Real Anita Hill" article and book in the early 1990s.

=== Autobiographies by Hill and Thomas ===
In 1997, Anita Hill penned her autobiography, Speaking Truth To Power, in which she addressed why she had filed no complaint at the time of the alleged harassment in the early 1980s:

I assessed the situation and chose not to file a complaint. I had every right to make that choice. And until society is willing to accept the validity of claims of harassment, no matter how privileged or powerful the harasser, it is a choice women will continue to make.

In 2007, Clarence Thomas published his memoirs, also revisiting the Anita Hill controversy. He described her as touchy and apt to overreact, and described her work at the EEOC as mediocre. He wrote:

On Sunday morning, courtesy of Newsday, I met for the first time an Anita Hill who bore little resemblance to the woman who had worked for me at EEOC and the Education Department. Somewhere along the line, she had been transformed into a conservative, devoutly religious Reagan-administration employee. In fact, she was a left-winger who'd never expressed any religious sentiments whatsoever during the time I'd known her, and the only reason why she'd held a job in the Reagan administration was because I'd given it to her.

In an op-ed piece in The New York Times on October 2, 2007, Hill wrote that she "will not stand by silently and allow [Justice Thomas], in his anger, to reinvent me."

== Films ==
Showtime dramatized the confirmation hearing in Strange Justice, a television film starring Delroy Lindo as Thomas and Regina Taylor as Hill, first aired August 29, 1999.

HBO dramatized the Senate hearing in Confirmation, a television film starring Kerry Washington as Hill and Wendell Pierce as Thomas, first aired April 16, 2016.

Clarence Thomas discussed his confirmation hearings and the Anita Hill allegations in the 2020 documentary Created Equal: Clarence Thomas In His Own Words.

== See also ==
- George H. W. Bush Supreme Court candidates
- Senate Judiciary Committee reviews of nominations to the Supreme Court of the United States
