= Cinny Kennard =

American executive, author and broadcast journalist

Cynthia "Cinny" Clare Kennard is an American business and nonprofit executive, author and former broadcast journalist. She is a board member of Wallis Annenberg Legacy Foundation, based in Los Angeles. Kennard was the Executive Director of the Annenberg Foundation for over a decade working alongside Foundation CEO Wallis Annenberg.

Kennard was a television news correspondent with CBS News in London, Los Angeles and Moscow, and a local television reporter in Texas, California and Indiana. Her journalism awards include a 1992 Alfred I. duPont–Columbia University Award for coverage of the 1991 Persian Gulf War.

She went on to a long career in nonprofit executive management with NPR, Smithsonian Media, and The Annenberg Retreat at Sunnylands.

== Early career ==
Kennard started her journalism career in the late 1970s at WNLK Radio in Norwalk, Connecticut, as a reporter, anchor, and talk show host. She was then an anchor and correspondent for WANE television in Fort Wayne, Indiana; KHOU television in Houston, Texas; and WFAA television station in Dallas, where she covered the Anita Hill and Clarence Thomas sexual harassment hearings, the 1992 U.S. presidential election, and the historic 1990 race where Ann Richards became the governor of Texas.

As a correspondent for CBS News, Kennard covered the 1992 Los Angeles riots, the 1993 Russian constitutional crisis and the war in the former Yugoslavia.

== Academic career at the University of Southern California ==
In 1999, Kennard became an assistant professor of broadcast journalism at the USC Annenberg School for Communication and Journalism from 1999 to 2003. She is currently a senior fellow at the USC Annenberg School for Communication and Journalism's Center on Communication and Leadership and Policy, where she leads the Women and Communication Leadership Initiative.

While at USC, Kennard helped to launch the International Journalism Program and other projects aimed at improving broadcast journalism, such as Reliable Resources, a Pew Charitable Trust-sponsored project to improve radio and television political coverage, and the Walter Cronkite Award for excellence in television political journalism, which was established as part of the Reliable Resources project.

She researched and published widely on the role of females in broadcast war coverage, including co-authoring, "Characteristics of War Coverage by Female Correspondents," in the book, Media and Conflict in the 21st Century (Palgrave Macmillan, 2005). Her research on gender and television war coverage was presented at several conferences, including the American Political Science Association. Kennard also co-authored a piece on gender and communications in, "The Shriver Report: A Woman's Nation Changes Everything."

== Executive career ==
Kennard transitioned from broadcast journalist to managing director and managing editor of NPR West, launching NPR's footprint in the Western United States in Culver City, California.

She continued her journalism career overseeing programming and operations for The Tavis Smiley Show, Day to Day, and the bi-coastal Morning Edition.

Kennard is the former senior vice president of programming at Smithsonian Enterprises and managed the Smithsonian joint venture with Showtime-CBS, the Smithsonian Channel. She also worked with former Secretary of the Smithsonian G. Wayne Clough on an e-book, "Best of Both Worlds: Museums, Libraries, and Archives in a Digital Age."

Kennard also served as a jury member of the Alfred I. duPont-Columbia University Award for excellence in broadcast journalism for about 10 years.

== Annenberg Retreat at Sunnylands (2010 - 2013) ==
Kennard served as Senior Advisor to the President at the Annenberg Retreat at Sunnylands, where national and foreign dignitaries and diplomats gather for Camp David-style summits and retreats. She was responsible for working to bring top elected officials to Sunnylands, including former President Barack Obama, former U.S. House Speaker John Boehner, Chinese President Xi Jinping and Abdullah II bin Al-Hussein, the King of Jordan.

Kennard completed the strategic plan for Sunnylands and is the executive producer of, "A Place Called Sunnylands," an award-winning orientation film that runs in the Sunnylands Visitor Center.

In January 2015 she became managing director to work with Board Chair Wallis Annenberg and Executive Director Leonard Aube.

== Annenberg Foundation (2015-2025) ==
Kennard served as Executive Director answering directly to CEO Wallis Annenberg at the Annenberg Foundation. Kennard’s leadership spanned a decade including during the COVID pandemic, when she worked with city and civic leaders on emergency response. Kennard was a co-founder of the first LA County Office to address food insecurity in Los Angeles, advocating for a food czar during COVID. She worked with the National Wildlife Federation to create the Wallis Annenberg Wildlife Crossing, the largest urban Wildlife Crossing in the world.

Kennard launched Annenberg Tech and Pledge LA in 2018 to expand tech access in Los Angeles. Kennard oversaw daily operations of the Annenberg Space for Photography, which closed in 2020 during the Pandemic after a ten-year run.

== Committees and boards ==
Kennard is Chair of the Advisory Board at the USC Center on Philanthropy & Public Policy, a member of The Trusteeship of the International Women’s Forum, and co-founder of Women Leaders in Philanthropy, a national group of female foundation executives. She is a member of the Milken Institute's Future of Aging Advisory Board Leadership Council.

She co-founded the Carole Kneeland Project for Responsible Journalism and serves as an executive board member.

Kennard is the Chair of the Board at the USC Center on Philanthropy and Public Policy and a member of The Trusteeship of the IWF and co-founded the Women Leaders in Philanthropy Group

== Personal life ==
Kennard is married to Vittorio Morandin and currently lives in Los Angeles. She was born to an Irish-Catholic family in Milford, Connecticut. Kennard is a graduate of the Academy of Our Lady of Mercy, Lauralton Hall (Class of 1972). She graduated with a bachelor's degree in communications from Northeastern University in 1977.
