= The Republican Noise Machine =

2004 book by David Brock

- Cover
- Author: David Brock
- Subject: Media bias
- Publisher: Crown Publishers
- Publication date: May 18, 2004
- Pages: 432
- ISBN: 1-4000-4875-3
- Dewey Decimal: 320.5209 B
- Preceded by: Blinded by the Right
- Followed by: Free Ride: John McCain and the Media

The Republican Noise Machine: Right-Wing Media and How It Corrupts Democracy is a 2004 book written by David Brock which chronicles how the American right wing was able to build its media infrastructure, and the tactics used by right-wing groups to pressure the media and spread misinformation to the public. The book was the prelude to Brock's launching of his organization Media Matters for America.

== Author ==
David Brock authored The Real Anita Hill in 1993, and had a hand in many other political books, including examinations of Bill and Hillary Clinton. He has said that his previous work was lies and distortions and disavowed his previous attacks he calls a smear campaign funded by wealthy right wing groups. His book Blinded By The Right: The Conscience Of An Ex-Conservative was a 2002 best-seller.

== Summary ==
Brock details the conservative media strategy subsequent to the time of Barry Goldwater, predicated on corporate funding of think tanks, such as The Heritage Foundation. Brock believes such think tanks serve not only as propagandists, but as tutors for industry lobbyists, and a training ground for conservative journalists who are not limited by the standards of objectivity and impartiality emphasized in the conventional news media.

According to Brock, conservative and Republican strategists "concoct smears, distortions, and outright lies", and then disseminate the product as 'talking points' to right-wing radio and Fox News, which Brock says set a narrative echoed by more mainstream news sources.

In an article published in Salon, Brock describes his involvement in a “Republican Noise Machine", by recounting that “[f]rom the Washington Times, to a stint as a 'research fellow' at the Heritage Foundation (the Right’s premier think tank), to a position as an 'investigative writer' at the muckraking magazine The American Spectator, and as the author of a best-selling right-wing book, I forwarded the right-wing agenda not as an open political operative or advocate but under the guise of journalism and punditry, fueled by huge sums of money from right-wing billionaires, foundations, and self-interested corporations.”
