= Academy of Our Lady of Mercy, Lauralton Hall =

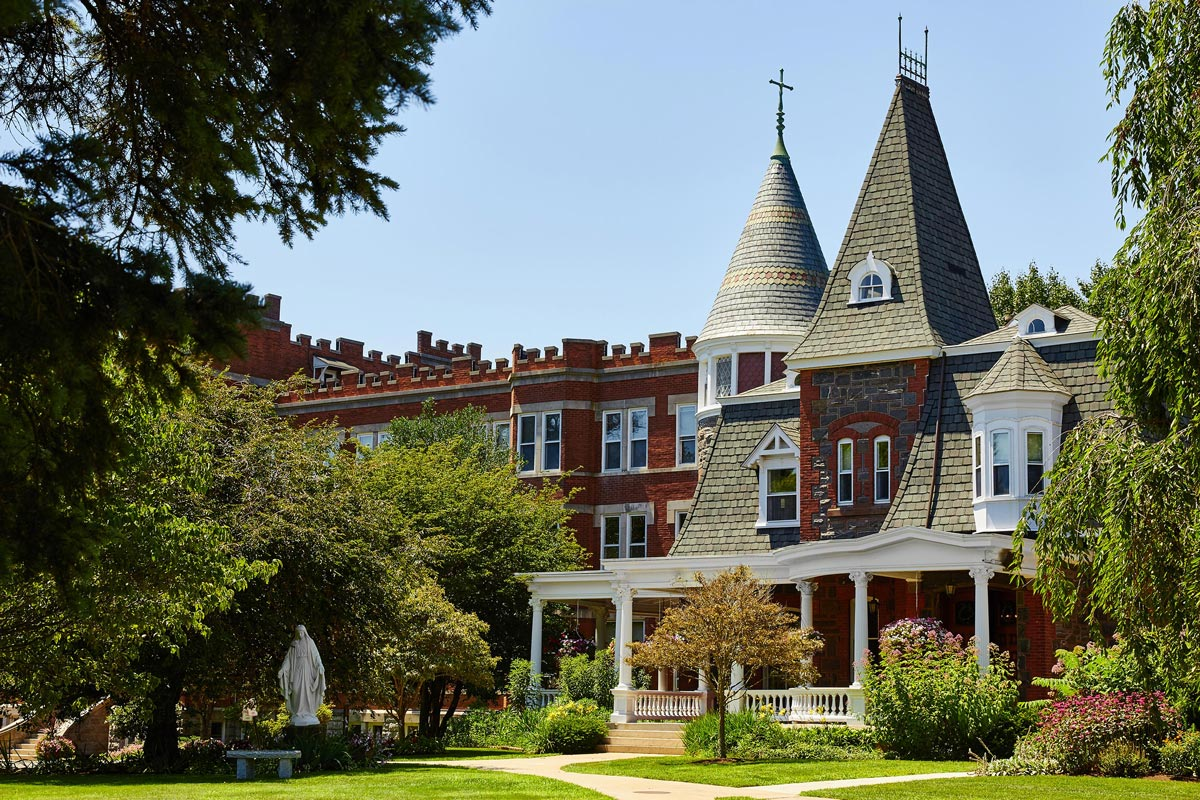

Location
- 200 High Street; Milford, New Haven County, Connecticut 06460; United States; 41°13′23″N 73°03′54″W

Information
- Type: All-girls
- Motto: Fides consequitur quodquonque petit (Faith attains all that it seeks)
- Religious affiliation: Catholic
- Established: 1905 (121 years ago)
- Founder: Sisters of Mercy
- CEEB code: 070415
- Head of school: Beth Coyne
- Staff: 15
- Faculty: 34
- Grades: 9–12
- Enrollment: 280 (as of 2022-2023)
- Campus size: 25 acres (100,000 m^{2})
- Colors: Blue and white
- Athletics: Field hockey, soccer, cross country, swimming, volleyball, basketball, cheer, indoor track, ice hockey, skiing, golf, lacrosse, tennis, softball, rowing, and track and field
- Athletics conference: Southern Connecticut Conference
- Mascot: Crusader
- Nickname: Lauralton; LH
- Team name: Crusaders
- Accreditation: New England Association of Schools and Colleges
- Publication: The Looking Glass (literary magazine), The Lauralton Insider (school magazine), "The Stitch" (school fashion magazine)
- Newspaper: Lauralton Highlights
- Yearbook: The Lauralton
- Tuition: $22,975 Tuition $32,975 International Student Tuition
- Website: www.lauraltonhall.org

The Academy of Our Lady of Mercy, Lauralton Hall, established in 1905 by the Sisters of Mercy, is an independent, Catholic, all-girls high school at 200 High Street in Milford, Connecticut, United States. It is part of the Archdiocese of Hartford.

It is the oldest Catholic college-preparatory school for girls in Connecticut. In August 2011, it was added to the National Register of Historic Places by the Connecticut Historic Preservation Council.

The school's 25-acre campus is located a block from the Metro-North Railroad's Milford station.

Students attend Lauralton Hall from nearly 40 cities and towns.

== Recent accomplishments ==
Lauralton Hall's engineering team consisting of 43 students in grades 9-12 recently participated in its sixth Sikorsky STEM Challenge and won. This year, students were asked to design a lightweight, semi-autonomous cargo transport system with color recognition abilities that would assimilate into the Sikorsky Skyhawk model. The system when activated will drive the Skyhawk rig to the identified colored building top, engage the hoist motor to retrieve the payload with the magnetic hook, and then return the Skyhawk rig to the starting location. The Lauralton Hall design utilized ergonomic buttons for activation and a 3-pulley system to reduce the strain on the hoist motor. Using an Arduino Uno, they programmed a color sensor to detect the correct rooftops and programmed the movements of the hoist and Skyhawk motors. Much of the mechanical design was created on CAD software and 3D printed at Lauralton Hall; this provided the foundational anchoring of the sensor, hardware, and electrical components of the system.

The Lauralton Hall Golf team won the 2023 SCC Girls Golf Championship at Blackhawk Country Club on Thursday, June 1 with a score of 388. Isabella Thomas '23 was also named to the SCC All-Conference team for girls' golf.

Milford United Percussion is a competitive percussion ensemble located at Lauralton Hall under the direction of Mr. Mark Allen, cordially dubbed Mallen by his students. It is composed of current and former students from many Milford high schools and surrounding towns and has been named MAC Festival Class A Champions in 2017, 2018, 2019, and 2023, and in 2024 champions of class Independent A. This group is consistently receiving Platinum ratings at the annual Great East Music Festival. The show this year included music from Betelgeuse the movie.

== Notable alumni ==
- Ursula Curtiss, fiction writer
- Rosa DeLauro, Democratic Congresswoman
- Cinny Kennard, journalist and business executive
- Marie C. Malaro, lawyer and professor
- Mary Newcomb, suffragette and actress
- Eileen Richetelli, former member of the United States diving team

== See also ==
- National Register of Historic Places listings in New Haven County, Connecticut
