= Lone Tree, Oklahoma =

Coordinates: 35°35′33″N 95°44′53″W

Lone Tree is a community in eastern Okmulgee County, Oklahoma, United States, approximately seven and one-half miles from Morris, traveling east on U.S. Route 62, then south on N4080 Rd. It was named for a "lone tree" sitting on the skyline of a mountain. Lone Tree Church is also located in this area near the so-called High Spring Mountains.

Lone Tree is the birthplace of Anita Hill, notable for accusing Supreme Court Justice Clarence Thomas of sexual harassment during his confirmation hearings in 1991.
