= The Minnesota Independent =

American news website

- Website type: Online magazine
- Owner: American Independent News Network
- Creator: American Independent News Network
- Website: www.minnesotaindependent.com
- Commercial: No
- Registration: To Add Comments
- Launched: August 2006; shut down in November 2011
- Current status: Inactive

The Minnesota Independent, formerly Minnesota Monitor, and sometimes known as MnIndy, was an independent online news website. It launched in August 2006, with a focus on coverage of political issues. The website was funded by the American Independent News Network. The website was closed down in 2011.

== Background ==
Minnesota Independent was staffed by both salaried reporters and paid fellows who received a stipend for their writing contributions. The initial pool of writers included a number of journalists and liberal Minnesota bloggers, including original site editor Robin Marty, Somali journalist Abdi Ayne, Joe Bodell and others. Later, the site brought on board professional journalists, such as Eric Black, who had written for the Star Tribune, and former City Pages writers Paul Demko and Molly Priesmeyer.

The site was edited by Paul Schmelzer, and received about 150,000 unique visitors per month. Traffic surpassed 250,000 in the month preceding the 2008 U.S. elections and surpassed 260,000 unique monthly visits in April 2009. A week after election day, the Center for Independent Media cut funding for two of six full-time staff members, Andy Birkey and Molly Priesmeyer, and for the entire freelance staff. Birkey has since been hired back, and a freelance budget, albeit smaller, was reinstated.

== History ==
Minnesota Independent broke a number of stories. During the Keith Ellison Qur'an oath controversy, the Independent's Abdi Aynte reported that Keith Ellison would not change his mind about being sworn in on the Qur'an. The Independent was the first to report that Living Word Christian Center may have violated IRS guidelines during a speech at the Church by Michele Bachmann. The story resulted in an ethical complaint being filed by CREW against the church.

The site also broke news that Minnesota United States Attorney Rachel Paulose was under investigation for mishandling classified information, and that a staffer for Rep. Michele Bachmann had sent out an emailed plea for support that violated house ethics rules.

Minnesota Independent reporter Andy Birkey won a 2010 Page One Award from the Society of Professional Journalists for best continuing coverage of the controversial Christian ministry You Can Run But You Cannot Hide. Media writer Paul Schmelzer won a 2008 Frank Premack Award for Public Affairs Journalism from the University of Minnesota School of Journalism and a 2nd Place in the 2006 Society of Professional Journalists Page One Awards. The site was nominated for the Koufax Award in 2007, and Andy Birkey was a finalist for the 2007 Online Journalism Award for his coverage of LGBT issues. In 2008, the site won three Society of Professional Journalists Page One Awards, and in 2009 increased the number of SPJ prizes to eight, including four first-place awards. Among independent online news enterprises it won best single news story (Paul Demko), best use of multimedia (Newsroom), best use of video (Paul Schmelzer) and best news blog (Newsroom).

== Editorial stance ==
The Minnesota Independent's focus and editorial slant was politically left. Fellows were drawn from media outlets including City Pages and the Star Tribune, as well from the left-of-center blogging community in Minnesota. The site featured a code of ethics that reads in part, "New Journalist Fellows should be honest, tireless, fair and courageous in gathering, reporting and interpreting information for the public."

== Contributors ==
- Andy Birkey
- Patrick Caldwell
- Luke Johnson
- Paul Schmelzer (Editor)
