= Marie C. Malaro =

American lawyer (1933–2018)

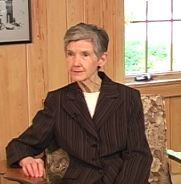
- Born: Marie Louise Clogher; January 23, 1933; New Haven, Connecticut, U.S.
- Died: July 16, 2018 (aged 85); Easton, Maryland, U.S.
- Education: Regis College (BA); Boston College (JD)
- Occupation: Lawyer
- Known for: Legal counsel for the Smithsonian Institution and Director of the Museum Studies Program at the George Washington University
- Notable work: A Legal Primer on Managing Museum Collections (1985); Museum Governance: Mission, Ethics, Policy (1994)
- Spouse: James C. Malaro (m. 1962)
- Children: 2

Marie Clogher Malaro (January 23, 1933 – July 16, 2018) was an American lawyer who served as legal counsel for the Smithsonian Institution, authored two books on museum collections and the law, and was Director of the Museum Studies Program at the George Washington University in Washington, D.C. Her work and research helped to pioneer the field of museum collections law.

== Early life and education ==
Malaro was born to Eaten James and Marie Louise (née Grenier) Clogher in New Haven, Connecticut on January 23, 1933. She grew up in the town of North Haven, Connecticut, but was educated at a private girls' school, Academy of Our Lady of Mercy, Lauralton Hall, in nearby Milford.

Malaro attended Regis College in Weston, Massachusetts, graduating in 1954 with a B.A. in history. She continued her studies at Boston College Law School, where she became the first women to make the Boston College Law Review. She earned her J.D. in 1957.

== Career ==
After passing the Connecticut bar exam in the summer of 1957, Malaro accepted a job as a lawyer for the Connecticut state legislature. She married James C. Malaro in 1962 and moved to Washington, D.C. to start a family.

In 1971, Malaro began working as legal counsel for the Smithsonian Institution. Her experience with the legal and ethical issues of museum collections policy was featured at the first annual American Law Institute - American Bar Association (ALI-ABA) Legal Issues in Museum Administration conference in 1972. She became a regular contributor of the seminar, writing articles and presenting lectures, until 1994.

Malaro was made Associate General Counsel of the Smithsonian in 1984. The next year, she published her first book, A Legal Primer on Managing Museum Collections. It was known at the time as "the bible of U.S. collections management."

In 1986, Malaro was made Director of the Museum Studies Program at the George Washington University (GWU), a position she held until 1997. Upon her retirement, Malaro was named professor emerita.

From 1988 to 1989, Malaro served as a member of The American Association of Museums (AAM, now the American Alliance of Museums) Ethics Task Force.

In 1994, Malaro published her second book, Museum Governance: Mission, Ethics, Policy.

The AAM honored Malaro at their 2006 Annual Meeting by naming her to their Centennial Honor Roll. The honor "was created to pay tribute to 100 of America's museum champions who have worked during the past 100 years to innovate, improve and expand how museums in the United States serve the public."

== Publications ==
- Malaro, Marie C. and Ildiko DeAngelis. A Legal Primer on Managing Museum Collections. Smithsonian Institution Press, 1985.
- Malaro, Marie C. Museum Governance: Mission, Ethics, Policy. Smithsonian Institution Press, 1994.
- Malaro, Marie C. "Governance." In Museums: A Place to Work, Planning Museum Careers, by Jane R. Glaser and Artemis A. Zenetou, 47–54. London: Routledge, 1996.
- Malaro, Marie C. "Legal Concerns." In Museums: A Place to Work, Planning Museum Careers, by Jane R. Glaser and Artemis A. Zenetou, 55–60. London: Routledge, 1996.
- Malaro, Marie C. "Deaccessioning: The American Perspective." In Reinventing the Museum: Historical and Contemporary Perspectives on the Paradigm Shift, edited by Gail Anderson, 331–340. Lanham: AltaMira Press, 2004.

=== Book reviews ===
- Endersby, Linda Eikmeier. "Book Review: A Legal Primer on Managing Museum Collections, 3rd edition." History News 68, no. 4 (October 2013): 30–31. https://www.jstor.org/stable/43503078.
- Keller, William B. "Book Review: A Legal Primer on Managing Museum Collections." Journal of the Art Libraries Society of North America 5, no. 4 (December 1986): 181–182. https://www.jstor.org/stable/27947681
- Merritt, Elizabeth. "Shaping the Financial Future of Museums: A Commentary by Marie Malaro." American Alliance of Museums: Center for the Future of Museums Blog.
