= The 65 Project =

Legal activism

- Founder: Melissa Moss
- Origins: Media and legal activist network with Facts First USA
- Methods: Disciplinary Bar Complaints, Negative Publicity
- Key people: Michael Teter
- Parent organization: Law Works
- Website: The65project.com

The 65 Project is a legal activism campaign seeking to "disbar and discredit" Trump-affiliated lawyers who worked on lawsuits supporting Trump's attempt to overturn the 2020 election. It has been described as a "dark money group."

The 65 Project's Managing Director is Michael Teter, an attorney suing Fox News as counsel for Ray Epps. The project was also devised by Democratic political consultant Melissa Moss, a former senior Clinton administration official, and operates through a not-for-profit named "Law Works."

== Methods ==
In line with the group's mission, the 65 Project files ethics complaints with bar associations, some of which have been dismissed for lack of evidence. These complaints have included high-profile figures, such as Ted Cruz, John Eastman and Cleta Mitchell. The 65 Project has also stated its interest in changing lawyers's professional rules, including placing limits on lawyers's public statements about elections.

The group stated in early 2022 it planned to take action against 111 attorneys. As of July 2023, all but one of the 65 Project's concluded complaints had been dismissed or found no punishable offense. In 2022, attorneys pursued by the group said they had received additional attempts after previous complaints were unsuccessful.

The group is advised by David Brock, who described the idea of the 65 Project as bringing attorney bar complaints, and to "shame them and make them toxic in their communities and in their firms". In the same 2022 interview with Axios, Brock said the project would target the livelihood and reputations of the attorneys.

== Reactions ==
Concerns over the methods of The 65 Project have been raised since at least March 2022. Bruce Green, the director of Fordham Law School's Louis Stein Center for Law and Ethics, emphasized that the 65 Project's complaints were "designed to embarrass" lawyers, discouraging political work "even if they're playing by the rules." CNN noted that the investigations sought by the 65 Project "unfold in secret" until claims are found meritorious in most states, but that, as Green raised concerns about, the 65 Projects "heavily publicized allegations" would harm lawyers' reputations before claims were reviewed. Complaints filed by The 65 Project have been dismissed since the group's first public announcements, beginning with Georgia attorney Brad Carver. However, the group had continued publishing adversarial media targeting lawyers' professional communities, planning advertising campaigns to run in law journals as recently as late fall 2024.

Alan Dershowitz, whose sanctions for "frivolous" election litigation followed complaints by Marc Elias's firm, compared the results of its work as similar to the "ridicule" faced by suspected communists during McCarthyism and Texas Congressman Lance Gooden described the 65 Project as "a far-left activist group of lawyers actively engaging in partisan tactics." The 65 Project describes itself as "bipartisan," and "defending democracy and the rule of law." The 65 Project elicited criticism from ethics complaint respondent Cleta Mitchell for not also pursuing attorney Marc Elias who had challenged the Iowa election results of Republican Mariannette Miller-Meeks previously.
