= Blinded by the Right =

2002 book by David Brock

- First edition
- Author: David Brock
- Genre: Non-fiction
- Publisher: Crown
- Publication date: 2002
- ISBN: 1-4000-4728-5
- Preceded by: The Seduction of Hillary Rodham
- Followed by: The Republican Noise Machine

Blinded by the Right: The Conscience of an Ex-Conservative is a 2002 book written by former conservative journalist David Brock, detailing his departure from the conservative movement. It is also the story of his coming out as a gay man.

In the book, he states that he visited gay bars with Matt Drudge and other conservatives. The title alludes to the Bruce Springsteen song "Blinded by the Light", while the subtitle alludes to Barry Goldwater's The Conscience of a Conservative, which helped define the modern conservative movement in the United States.

== Synopsis ==
Brock recalls his days at the University of California, Berkeley, and how he was turned off by hecklers at a speech by then United States ambassador to the United Nations, Jeane Kirkpatrick. Brock's main attraction to conservatism was his disdain for communism.

After college, Brock moved with his then-partner (called "Andrew" to conceal his identity) to Washington, D.C. In D.C., Brock worked for The Washington Times and The American Spectator. Brock claims while he was working for those publications he thought he was doing honest journalism, but later stated that he had never corroborated his facts.

While working for The American Spectator, he wrote an article on Anita Hill, which he later expanded into The Real Anita Hill, a book that made him popular in the conservative movement. Brock would later say that many of the details he used were false.

After Bill Clinton was elected, Brock was assigned to write a story, later dubbed Troopergate, about four Arkansas state troopers who held a grudge against Bill Clinton. He claims that the troopers made up stories about affairs that could never be corroborated. Brock was given assurances that the troopers would not get paid for telling their stories. He later discovered he was deceived, and that the troopers had been paid by Richard Mellon Scaife, who bankrolled The American Spectator and the Arkansas Project, a secret project to discredit Clinton.

Brock made sure to conceal the identities of the women identified by the troopers, with the exception of one woman named "Paula". Brock thought that by not revealing her last name, it would be enough to conceal her identity. Brock did not take into account that Little Rock is a small city. Eventually her identity would be revealed as Paula Jones, which led to her civil lawsuit against Bill Clinton.

Following the Troopergate story, Brock wrote a book about Hillary Clinton, The Seduction of Hillary Rodham. Unlike the Anita Hill book, Brock decided not to put anything in the book that he could not corroborate. The book was not as critical of Hillary Clinton as it was promised to be. Brock claims that conservatives planned on the book being so damning as to influence the outcome of the 1996 presidential election.

The Seduction of Hillary Rodham was the beginning of Brock's falling out with the conservative movement. The issue that forced him to leave the conservative movement was the movement's intolerance towards homosexuality. Brock had reluctantly come out of the closet, prior to writing the Hillary Clinton book, and believes this contributed to his being shunned by many in the movement.

Brock voted for Al Gore in 2000, the first time he voted since he voted for Ronald Reagan in 1984. During the period in which he did not vote, he had two rationalizations for his non-voting:

- He believed that his vote did not count in liberal Washington, D.C.
- He believed that not voting allowed him to stay neutral

Brock proclaimed that the latter rationalization was bogus, as he was not neutral during that time period.
