= The American Independent =

American liberal news website

- Website type: News
- Available in: English
- Owners: David Brock, True Blue Media, LLC
- Parent: American Independent Institute
- Website: americanindependent.com
- Commercial: Yes
- Launched: 2014; 12 years ago (originally Blue Nation Review)
- Current status: Active

The American Independent, formerly known as Blue Nation Review or Shareblue Media, is an American progressive news outlet. According to Axios, it publishes "partisan newspapers designed to look like an impartial news source" that "show up on voters' doorsteps in battleground states in the final days before an election." It is affiliated with American Bridge 21st Century, a Democratic Party super PAC.

== History ==
Under its original name Blue Nation Review the site published a report on the spending habits of former U.S. Representative Aaron Schock (R-Ill.), playing a role in his eventual resignation.

In November 2015 the site was sold by Moko Social Media Limited, a multi-media platform developer, to Media Matters for America founder David Brock. Brock terminated almost all of the previous staff and hired Peter Daou – a former Clinton Senate-staffer who worked for her 2008 presidential campaign as a digital media strategist – to head True Blue Media LLC and to write for the website. The website relaunched as Shareblue in September 2016.

Brock said that the main goal of the website was to get presidential candidate Hillary Clinton elected. During the primaries the website endorsed Hillary Clinton and was critical of Bernie Sanders, posting stories like, "With Bernie Sanders As Their Nominee, Democrats Can Kiss The Presidency Goodbye" and, "Why does Bernie Sanders keep denigrating Hillary's supporters?" Tad Devine, a Sanders campaign consultant, called it, "the pond scum of American politics". Nick Merrill, a spokesman for Clinton, viewed Shareblue more as a necessary voice in a world teeming with conservative radio, television, and Internet outlets that fire up the Republican base.

After Clinton won the primary Shareblue focused its attention on Donald Trump "exposing what it considers to be news coverage stacked against" Clinton. The group's major message was, "that a shameful false equivalence was causing the media to soft-pedal Mr. Trump's many transgressions and overplay the few it could find on Mrs. Clinton".

In November 2019 Shareblue Media changed its name to The American Independent.

== Controversies ==
The American Independent and its previous iterations have been involved in some controversies. Specifically, they have been referred to as a pseudo-news outlet by Influence Watch of the politically conservative Capital Research Center. Additionally, Axios has reported that The American Independent is associated with a national for-profit company that publishes partisan news under the guise of local news.

Newsguard, which tracks misinformation online, further stated that, "The American Independent clearly discloses its progressive perspective at the bottom of each page and on a Company page...However, the website does not disclose on its About Us page or within individual stories that it is owned by Brock and funded by the American Bridge 21st Century Foundation. The foundation's associated super PAC describes itself on its website as 'the opposition research engine of the Democratic Party.' Because The American Independent does not disclose it is funded by a politically active, liberal nonprofit, while publishing content that advances the organization's interests, NewsGuard has determined that the website does not gather and present information responsibly."
