= American Independent Institute =

Liberal nonprofit

American Independent
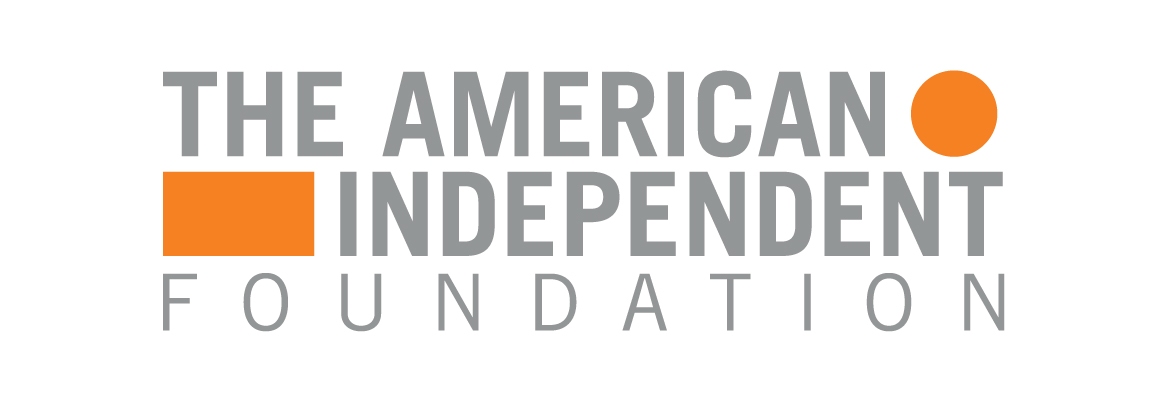
- Founders: David S. Bennahum, David Brock
- Established: 2006, relaunched in 2014
- President: Joe Conason
- Budget: $58.6 million (2024)
- Subsidiaries: The American Independent
- Formerly called: Center for Independent Media (2006–2010); American Independent News Network (2010–2014)
- Location: Washington, D.C.
- Website: tainews.com

The American Independent is a pseudo-news organization funded by Democratic Party political action committees. According to the organization, its aim is to support journalism which exposes "the nexus of conservative power in Washington." The current institute, started by David Brock in 2014, is a relaunch of the former state-based digital news-gathering network known as the American Independent News Network.

As of 2024, the American Independent had state level affiliates in Pennsylvania, Michigan, Montana, Nebraska, and Wisconsin. Its outlets microtarget ideologically moderate and progressive female voters, seeking to sway them to vote for Democrats. The American Independent is run in concert with American Bridge 21st Century, the largest Democratic Party opposition research group. The American Independent does not disclose its donors. According to The Washington Post, "The Independent has quietly positioned itself on the edge of an emerging and controversial industry fueled by ideological donors who are looking to further political agendas with the trappings of old-fashioned journalism."

== History ==
The American Independent News Network was founded as the Center for Independent Media in 2006 by David S. Bennahum, a former journalist with Wired. The group had a stated mission of "investigating and disseminating news that impacts public debate and advances the common good." It operated a news network which consisted of state-based daily news sites The Colorado Independent, Florida Independent, Iowa Independent, Michigan Messenger, Minnesota Independent, New Mexico Independent, and Washington Independent. It changed its name to the American Independent News Network in 2010.

In 2011, the organization's founder, David S. Bennahum, departed the organization after shutting down most of the organization's state websites. The group peaked in traffic and revenues in 2009 and 2010 before both numbers dropped off considerably. By 2013, the American Independent News Network had shuttered all of it sites and gone on hiatus.

The Project for Excellence in Journalism of the Pew Research Center surveyed and analyzed nonprofit news organizations active on the state or national level in 2011 and again in 2013. The studies found that the most consistently ideological of the news outlets were those that were organized in networks, specifically the conservative Watchdog.org network and the liberal American Independent News Network. The 2011 study found that "the liberal American Independent News Network [doesn't] ... reveal much about who's paying their bills, and [its] work skews clearly in one direction, both in the topics [it covers] and the content of individual stories".

== 2014 relaunch ==
In 2014, the dormant American Independent News Network organization was re-launched by David Brock as the American Independent Institute, a journalistic grant-making entity focused on liberal investigative journalism. The Nation reported that year that Brock's newly relaunched group would disperse $320,000 in grants to "reporters investigating right-wing misdeeds."
