= David Brock =

American political consultant and author

- Born: Hackensack, New Jersey, U.S.
- Education: University of California, Berkeley (BA)
- Occupations: Political commentator, author
- Known for: Author of The Real Anita Hill; Founder of Media Matters for America, Correct the Record, Shareblue, and American Bridge 21st Century; Advisor of The 65 Project
- Partner: William Grey (2000–2010)

David Brock is an American liberal political consultant, author, and commentator who founded the media watchdog group Media Matters for America. He has been described by Time as "one of the most influential operatives in the Democratic Party".

Brock began his career as a right-wing investigative reporter during the 1990s. He wrote the book The Real Anita Hill and the Troopergate story, which led to Paula Jones filing a lawsuit against Bill Clinton. In 1997 he switched political sides, aligning himself with the Democratic Party and in particular with Bill and Hillary Clinton.

In 2004, he founded Media Matters for America, a non-profit organization which describes itself as a "progressive research and information center dedicated to comprehensively monitoring, analyzing and correcting conservative misinformation in the U.S. media". He has since also founded super PACs called American Bridge 21st Century and Correct the Record, has become a board member of the super PAC Priorities USA Action, advised The 65 Project, and has been elected chairman of Citizens for Responsibility and Ethics in Washington (CREW). Brock left Media Matters in November 2022. After leaving Media Matters, he founded Facts First USA, a 501(c)(4) group designed to counter Republican-led congressional investigations.

== Early life and education ==
David Brock was born in Hackensack, New Jersey, and was adopted by Dorothea and Raymond Brock. He has a younger sister, Regina, who was also adopted. Brock was raised Roman Catholic. His father, whom Brock has described as "a Pat Buchanan conservative", was a marketing executive.

Brock grew up in Wood-Ridge, New Jersey, where he went to Our Lady of the Assumption School, and later attended Paramus Catholic High School in Paramus, New Jersey. During his sophomore year of high school, Brock's family moved to the Dallas, Texas, area where Brock attended Newman Smith High School. Brock became editor of his high school newspaper, which he says he "fashioned into a crusading liberal weekly in the middle of the Reaganite Sunbelt".

Brock attended the University of California, Berkeley, where he graduated with a B.A. in history in 1985. He also worked as a reporter and editor for The Daily Californian, the campus newspaper. Brock arrived at college as a liberal Democrat, but at Berkeley he was "repelled by the culture of doctrinaire leftism" and turned to the political right. The turning point came with a column supporting the US invasion of Grenada that he wrote for The Daily Californian and that led to demands he resign from the newspaper staff. "I thought it was McCarthyism of the left", Brock later said. "I thought it was extremely intolerant." He then founded a neoconservative weekly, the Berkeley Journal.

== Journalism career ==
=== Conservative journalism ===
While he was at Berkeley, Brock contributed an op-ed to The Wall Street Journal entitled "Combating Those Campus Marxists". It drew the attention of John Podhoretz, who at the time was the editor of Insight on the News, a weekly newsmagazine published by The Washington Times. Podhoretz flew Brock to Washington, D.C. for an interview and hired him as a writer of the Insight on the News. A job Brock took up in 1986. After working at Insight on the News, Brock spent some time as a fellow at the Heritage Foundation.

=== The Real Anita Hill ===
In March 1992, in a 17,000-word article for The American Spectator, Brock challenged the claims of Anita Hill, who had accused Clarence Thomas of sexual harassment. Shortly thereafter Brock became a full-time staff member at that publication. In 1993, Brock expanded his article into a book, The Real Anita Hill. Brock's description of Hill in the book as "a bit nutty and a bit slutty" was widely quoted.

The book became a best-seller. It was later attacked in a book review in The New Yorker by Jane Mayer, a reporter for The New Yorker, and Jill Abramson, who was at that time a reporter for The Wall Street Journal. The two later expanded their article into the book Strange Justice, which cast Anita Hill in a much more sympathetic light. It, too, was a best-seller. Brock replied to their book with a book review of his own in The American Spectator. In that review, he asserted that Mayer and Abramson had no evidence to claim that Clarence Thomas was a habitual user of pornography. Later, in his book Blinded by the Right, he wrote, "When I wrote those words, I knew they were false. I put a lie in print."

=== Troopergate ===
In a January 1994 The American Spectator story about Bill Clinton's time as governor of Arkansas, Brock, by then on staff at the magazine, made accusations that bred Troopergate. Among other things, the story contained the first printed reference to Paula Jones, referring to a woman named "Paula" who state troopers said offered to be Clinton's partner. Jones called Brock's account of her encounter with Clinton "totally wrong", and she later sued Clinton for sexual harassment, a case that became entangled in the independent counsel's investigation of the Whitewater controversy, and set in motion a series of developments that led to the exposure of Clinton's affair with Monica Lewinsky and, ultimately, to Clinton's impeachment trial. The story received an award later that year from Joseph Farah's Western Journalism Center, and was partially responsible for a rise in the magazine's circulation. Brock later recanted much of what he had written about Clinton and Jones.

=== The Seduction of Hillary Rodham ===
After the success of The Real Anita Hill, Simon & Schuster's then-conservative-focused Free Press subsidiary paid Brock a large advance to write a book about Hillary Clinton. The expectation was that it would be a takedown in the style of his writings on Anita Hill and Bill Clinton. The project took a different turn, and the resulting book, The Seduction of Hillary Rodham, proved to be largely sympathetic to Hillary Clinton. Given the large advance and tight one-year deadline by Free Press, Brock was under tremendous pressure to produce another bestseller. However, the book contained no major scoops. In Blinded by the Right (2002), Brock said that he had reached a turning point: he had thoroughly examined charges against the Clintons, could not find any evidence of wrongdoing, and did not want to make any more misleading claims. Brock further said that his former friends in right-wing politics shunned him because Seduction did not adequately attack the Clintons. National Review proposed another theory: since "no liberal source in the world would talk to Brock", he could not collect the kind of information he was after. National Review also suggested that while writing the book, Brock had been "seduced" by Sidney Blumenthal, a champion and friend of the Clinton circle.

When the book came out, it was widely criticized for not breaking any new ground. John Balzar, reviewing the book in the Los Angeles Times, called it "[e]xhaustive to the point of exhaustion" and "predictably critical but unexpectedly measured, at least in comparison to what Beltway gossips anticipated". James B. Stewart, reviewing the book in The New York Times, said that Brock had "tried to do his subject justice in the broadest sense" but added that "[a]t times he goes too far", often "echo[ing] her apologists" and "dismiss[ing] or rationaliz[ing] the sometimes powerful evidence that Hillary Rodham Clinton has lied ... by invoking a relativism rooted in Republican precedents."

== Changing sides ==
The Nation has described Brock as a "conservative journalistic assassin turned progressive empire-builder", while National Review has called him a "right-wing assassin turned left-wing assassin", and Politico has profiled him as a "former right-wing journalist-turned-pro-Clinton crusader". In July 1997, Esquire magazine published a confessional piece by Brock entitled "Confessions of a Right-Wing Hit Man" in which he recanted much of what he said in his two best-known American Spectator articles and criticized his own reporting methods. Discouraged at the reaction his Hillary Clinton biography received, he said, "I ... want out. David Brock the Road Warrior of the Right is dead." Four months later, The American Spectator declined to renew his employment contract, under which he was being paid over $300,000 per year.

Writing again for Esquire in April 1998, Brock apologized to Clinton for his yellow journalism about Troopergate. In 2001, Brock accused one of his former sources, Terry Wooten, of leaking FBI files for use in his book about Anita Hill. Brock defended his betrayal of a confidential source by saying, "I've concluded that what I was involved in wasn't journalism, it was a political operation, and I was part of it. ... So I don't think the normal rules of journalism would apply to what I was doing". Wooten denies the accusation.

=== Blinded by the Right ===
Brock's book Blinded by the Right: The Conscience of an Ex-Conservative was published in 2002. In this book, an "outgrowth" of Confessions of a Right-Wing Hit Man, Brock charted what the Daily Beast called his "remarkable metamorphosis to ardent acolyte from sworn enemy of Bill and Hillary Clinton." Brock apologized for his attacks on the Clintons and Anita Hill and claimed that he had now risen above character assassination. He wrote that he had been "a mad dog, an emotional monster", "a whore for the cash", "a Jew in Hitler's army", and "a witting cog in the Republican sleaze machine", and asserted that he hadn't known "what good reporting was".

Many critics responded with skepticism to Brock's claim to have reformed himself. The reviewer for The Washington Post wrote that Brock "quotes the worst things critics said about him, and agrees with every word". Christopher Hitchens, in The Nation, called Brock's book "an exercise in self-love, disguised as an exercise in self-abnegation", and declared that Brock was failing to state the truth. These and other critics noted that Brock, while claiming to feel remorse for his attacks on the Clintons and professing to have put personal assaults behind him, now seemed as eager to go after targets on the right as he had once gone after targets on the left. Hitchens responded with disgust, for example, to Brock's "coarse attack" in the book on Juanita Broaddrick, who had accused Bill Clinton of rape, but denied the rape under oath. Hitchens was particularly harsh, stating that Brock "inserts a completely gratuitous slander against a decent woman, all of whose independent assertions have survived meticulous fact-checking".

Many readers on the left greeted the book with enthusiasm, and eagerly welcomed Brock. This was especially true of the Clintons. Shortly after the book's publication, Bill Clinton phoned Brock at home and praised it lavishly. Later, according to Politico, "Brock was invited to the former president's Harlem office where he was shocked to discover Clinton had purchased dozens of copies — and stuffed them into a big cabinet". Clinton, it turned out, was mailing them to friends across the country. Clinton "insisted" that Brock contact his speaking agent and give talks around the country attacking conservatives. According to The Nation, Democratic donors "loved Brock's conversion story, particularly since he'd been inside the machine they hoped to replicate." Brock's book is seen as having propelled him into a favorable position among the Democratic Party establishment.

=== The Republican Noise Machine ===
Brock directly addressed the right-wing "machine" in his 2004 book, The Republican Noise Machine, in which he detailed an alleged interconnected, concerted effort to raise the profile of conservative opinions in the press through false accusations of liberal media bias, dishonest and highly partisan columnists, partisan news organizations and academic studies, and other methods. Publishers Weekly (PW) described it as a "blistering j'accuse" that, compared to Blinded by the Right, was "a less gossipy and more systematic assault on the right-wing media juggernaut." According to PW, Brock depicted the mainstream media as being "cowed by spurious charges of 'liberal bias'" and as therefore having "abandoned their role as objective arbiters of truth in favor of an uncritical airing of partisan ideology in the name of 'balance.'" PW stated that Brock could not "be accused of nonpartisanship". Also in 2004, he featured briefly in the BBC series The Power of Nightmares, where he stated that the Arkansas Project engaged in political terrorism.

== Political operative career ==
=== Media Matters for America ===
In 2004, Brock founded the progressive media watchdog group Media Matters for America (MMA) which describes itself as being "dedicated to comprehensively monitoring, analyzing, and correcting conservative misinformation in the U.S. media." Brock said that he founded the organization to combat the conservative journalism sector that he had once been a part of. He founded the group with help from the Center for American Progress. Initial donors included Leo Hindery, Susie Tompkins Buell, and James Hormel. Media Matters is known for its aggressive criticism of conservative journalists and media outlets, including its "War on Fox News". The New York Times, in a 2008 profile, called MMA "a highly partisan research organization" and quoted Democratic operative James Carville as saying that MMA was "more effective than any single entity" on the left. Pollster Frank Luntz called MMA "one of the most destructive organizations associated with American politics today." In a 2011 interview with Politico, Brock vowed to wage "guerrilla warfare and sabotage" against Fox News.

When Brock proposed the idea of Media Matters, Hillary Clinton invited him to the Clintons' Chappaqua home to pitch the idea to potential donors. MMA, according to a 2015 article in The Daily Beast, "operates from a posh Washington office space with a multi-million-dollar budget and nearly 100 employees." In 2014, The Nation stated that "Brock, in partnership with fundraiser Mary Pat Bonner—often described as his secret weapon—has turned out to be unparalleled at maintaining rich liberals' loyalty and support." An insider told The Nation that Brock and Bonner "are probably the most effective major-individual-donor fundraising team ever assembled in the independent-expenditure progressive world."

It was reported in June 2015 that when the House Select Committee on Benghazi questioned Sidney Blumenthal, committee members asked no fewer than 45 questions about Brock and Media Matters. The committee was reportedly interested in Sidney Blumenthal's paid work for Brock's nonprofits, and in the question of "whether Blumenthal and Brock did anything improper as they helped Clinton manage the political fallout from the attacks in Benghazi, Libya, while she was secretary of State."

=== Hillary Clinton's 2008 campaign ===
Brock was active in Hillary Clinton's campaign for the presidency in 2008.

=== American Bridge 21st Century ===
Brock announced in 2010 that he was forming a Super PAC, American Bridge 21st Century, to help elect liberal Democrats, starting with the 2012 election cycle. In 2011, Brock founded the PAC, which seeks "to track every utterance of every major GOP candidate". The Los Angeles Times described him as having "reinvented the art of opposition research". The group's work reportedly "did so much damage to Republicans in the 2012 elections" that they sought to replicate Brock's efforts. In describing Brock's intentions for the super-PAC, The New York Times referred to Brock as a "prominent Democratic political operative", and New York magazine referred to Brock's "hyperpartisanship".

The group had more than 80 staffers as of 2014. It has researchers based in Washington, D.C., plus "a national network of professional trackers" who follow the moves and statements of every conceivable contender for the Republican nomination. The Nation has described American Bridge as "the natural next step" after MMA, explaining that "Brock took the Media Matters method—which involves monitoring virtually every word uttered by the right-wing media—and transferred it to the realm of Republican politicians." Democratic operative Paul Begala told The Nation that in 2012 American Bridge "produced for us a 950-page book of every business deal of Mitt Romney's career. We spent something like $65 million [2012 election], and I believe every single ad was in some ways informed by Brock's research."

=== Correct the Record ===
In late 2013 Brock founded Correct the Record, described by The New York Times as Hillary Clinton's "own personal media watchdog", keeping track of all negative news surrounding her. Brock had first come up with the idea for the group that summer. "Having left the State Department," he said, "Clinton didn't have the kind of robust operation that one would have if one was holding public office. That's where I saw the need." The organization, whose staff "is crammed into a newsroom-style bullpen in the back corner of the offices of American Bridge 21st Century", "keeps constant watch for any conceivable attacks against her, and then aggressively beats them back before they take hold." In September 2015, Brock and Correct the Record produced a piece on Bernie Sanders, linking him to Hugo Chávez and British Labour Party leader Jeremy Corbyn.

=== Priorities USA Action ===
In early 2014, Brock was named to the board of Priorities USA Action as the super PAC also announced its support for a possible Hillary Clinton presidential run in 2016. In February 2015, Brock abruptly resigned his position with the super PAC. In his resignation letter, he accused Priorities officials of conducting "an orchestrated political hit job" against MMA and American Bridge. The New York Times had run an article questioning his groups' fundraising practices, and he charged that "current and former Priorities officials were behind this specious and malicious attack on the integrity of these critical organizations." His resignation "set off panic among influential Democrats", because his other groups' research "provides the foundation for the multimillion-dollar advertising campaigns created with Priorities cash" and because "key Priorities donors have long-standing personal ties with him." Brock was persuaded to return to Priorities later in 2015.

=== The American Democracy Legal Fund ===
Brock also founded and runs the American Democracy Legal Fund, a nonprofit that has been accused of existing solely to create "a steady stream of lawsuits accusing Republicans of ethics and campaign finance violations."

=== American Independent Institute ===
In 2014, Brock relaunched the American Independent News Network, formerly a network of progressive state-based reporting outlets, into the American Independent Institute, a group which provides grants for liberal investigative journalism projects. Brock serves as the group's president. The institute finances journalists "investigating rightwing activities". In 2014, it gave $320,000 in grants "to reporters investigating right-wing misdeeds".

=== CREW ===
In 2014, Brock became the chairman of the Citizens for Responsibility and Ethics in Washington board of directors, in what was characterized as a more explicitly partisan stance for the organization. Brock was elected as CREW's board president after laying out a broad plan to turn the organization into a more muscular and partisan organization. Politico described this as "a major power play that aligns liberal muscle more fully behind the Democratic Party — and Hillary Clinton" and said that Brock had set forth a plan "to turn the group into a more muscular — and likely partisan — attack dog."

While CREW operates as a 501(c)3 nonprofit prohibited from engaging in partisan activity, Brock made clear he intends to create a more politically oriented arm registered under section 501(c)4, and also form a new overtly partisan watchdog group called The American Democracy Legal Fund registered under section 527, allowing it to engage in direct political activity. Along with Brock's election, consultant David Mercer and investor Wayne Jordan joined CREW's board of directors. When asked if CREW would still continue pursuing complaints against Democrats, Brock responded, "No party has a monopoly on corruption and at this early juncture, we are not making categorical statements about anything that we will and won't do. Having said that, our experience has been that the vast amount of violations of the public trust can be found on the conservative side of the aisle."

=== Killing the Messenger ===
In his 2015 book Killing the Messenger: The Right-Wing Plot to Derail Hillary Clinton and Hijack Your Government, Brock described "how the Clintons quickly switched from prey to patrons, setting him on his current path as a fundraiser and progressive provocateur." In the book, Brock accused The New York Times of being a "megaphone for conservative propaganda" directed inordinately at Clinton. He was particularly critical of the Times's senior politics editor and former Washington bureau chief Carolyn Ryan. At the same time, in the words of Politico, he depicted Bill and Hillary Clinton "as personal and political angels".

Calling the book a "trenchant j'accuse", Publishers Weekly said that parts of it "read like a fund-raising prospectus" for MMA but concluded that while "Brock's rhetorical venom and naked partisanship will alienate some readers ... his sharp-eyed reporting makes for a spirited challenge to business-as-usual political discourse." The Daily Beast described the book as "partly a sanitized summary of Brock's already exhaustively-chronicled personal history, partly an attack on the journalism establishment, and partly a call to arms on behalf of his favorite presidential candidate."

Hanna Rosin wrote that it reads like "pages that bullet-point Hillary's accomplishments as secretary of state or the achievements of the Clinton Foundation." Rosin alleged that the book attempted to whitewash any criticisms surrounding the Clintons. Rosin stated: "So dogged is Brock's devotion to Hillary that it often gets in the way of his being credible, not to mention interesting." Responding to Brock's criticism of The New York Times, Eileen Murphy, a spokeswoman for the newspaper, told CNN: "David Brock is an opportunist and a partisan who specializes in personal attacks." Murphy complained that Brock's "partisanship has led him to lash out at some of our aggressive coverage of important political figures and it's unsurprising that he has now turned personal."

In October 2015, Brock gave a presentation at Georgetown University entitled "Is the Mainstream Media in Cahoots with Conservatives?".

=== Purchase of Blue Nation Review ===
In 2015, Brock formed an investment venture, True Blue Media, to purchase an 80 percent stake in Blue Nation Review, an online news website. Blue Nation Review was later re-branded as Shareblue.

=== Hillary Clinton's 2016 campaign ===
The Los Angeles Times has described Brock as "integral to Hillary's run" for the presidency in 2016. Clinton adviser Paul Bagela commented: "What kind of a movement would we be if we rejected converts? He saw the permanent intellectual and ideological infrastructure they have on the right and brought it to the left." A March 6, 2015, article in National Review noted that while other "Democratic kingmakers" were "in retreat" in the wake of the news that Hillary Clinton had "used a private e-mail account on a private server to avoid public scrutiny while secretary of state", Brock remained fiercely loyal. Appearing on MSNBC's Morning Joe in 2015, Brock insisted that Clinton had violated no rules by using a private email server. It was reported on September 1, 2015, that a batch of Hillary Clinton's emails that had been made public included one from Brock entitled "Memo on Impeaching Clarence Thomas". In the memo, Brock discussed possible ways of trying to bring down the Supreme Court justice whose cause he had championed in The Real Anita Hill.

Politico reported in January 2016 that Brock was preparing a new advertisement that would call on presidential candidate Bernie Sanders "to release his medical records before the Iowa caucuses on Feb. 1." Brock was subjected to a storm of criticism for this plan, and only hours after Politico's report, Clinton campaign chairman John Podesta scolded Brock on Twitter. Later in January, Brock responded to a Sanders campaign ad by telling the Associated Press: "From this ad, it seems black lives don't matter much to Bernie Sanders", Sanders aides responded by accusing Brock of "mudslinging". Sanders spokesman Michael Briggs said in a statement: "Bernie Sanders, as everyone knows, has one of the strongest civil rights records in Congress. He doesn't need lectures on civil rights and racial issues from David Brock, the head of a Hillary Clinton Super Pac." Briggs added: "Twenty-five years ago it was Brock – a mud-slinging, right-wing extremist – who tried to destroy Anita Hill, a distinguished African American law professor. He later was forced to apologize for his lies about her. Today, he is lying about Sen Sanders. It's bad enough that Hillary Clinton is raising millions in special-interest money in her Super Pacs. It is worse that she would hire a mudslinger like David Brock."

At a campaign event in Iowa in late January 2016, Bernie Sanders denied any plans to "bus in out-of-state college students to caucus for him", charging that this was a lie and attributing it to Brock. On February 8, 2016, after the near-tie in the Iowa caucuses between Clinton and Sanders, Brock told Politico that "Senator Sanders is trying to live in the purity bubble, and it needs to be burst." He described Sanders's efforts to link Clinton to Wall Street as an "artful smear", and, in a reference to the Democratic National Committee's passing of data to the Sanders campaign the previous December, said that Clinton "would've been hounded out of the race if her staff had done what his did, in stealing data and misleading the press about it, then raising money off it." Clinton's campaign, Brock insisted, "has stayed remarkably positive in the face of a relentlessly negative campaign from Sanders." As for Sanders's platform, Brock maintained that "a unanimous chorus of serious progressive commentators ... find almost nothing of any substantive value in his so-called policies."

=== Activism to bring forth sexual assault allegations ===
The New York Times reported in December 2017 that a group founded by Brock had spent $200,000 in an unsuccessful effort to bring forward accusations of sexual misconduct against Donald Trump during the 2016 presidential race. He was reportedly considering doing the same to congressional Republicans.

== Personal life ==
Brock was formerly in a long-term relationship with restaurant owner James Alefantis. On March 22, 2017, Brock suffered a heart attack while at work at Media Matters headquarters.

== Reception ==
Paul Ryan, a lawyer at the Campaign Legal Center, considered complaining about Brock to the Federal Election Commission and Justice Department, charging that he was "creating new ways to undermine campaign regulation." He was referencing Brock's simultaneous involvement with Correct the Record, American Bridge, and Priorities USA Action since the first two groups worked closely with Hillary Clinton's campaign, while Priorities USA Action, the largest Democratic Party super PAC, is legally prohibited from doing so. Brock claimed to have stopped working directly with American Bridge, although its staffers continued to operate out of his office.

In 2001, Jonah Goldberg wrote in National Review that while Brock has been "hailed by liberals for 'coming clean,' they would never really trust him." He quoted reporter Jill Abramson as having said that "the problem with Brock's credibility" is that "once you admit you've knowingly written false things, how do you know when to believe what he writes?" Similarly, The Guardian referred in 2014 to "residual unease among some liberal operatives that Brock's conversion story fits into a pattern of opportunism and self-promotion rather than ideological transformation." Observing in 2015 that Brock had admitted to mudslinging before, The Daily Beast noted a difficulty in dispatching fears he would do it again. Brock's claim that the Clintons have never committed any wrongdoing has received criticisms from many, including fellow Democrats, who have cited instances of abuse.

Cenk Uygur of The Young Turks criticized Brock's negative coverage of the Bernie Sanders 2016 presidential campaign, specifically the alleged invention of the "Bernie Bro" controversy. Uygur said that Brock's January 10, 2017, open letter of apology to Sanders and his voters, was disingenuous because it was motivated by a desire to raise money from wealthy Democratic donors and to foster a perception of himself as being a member of the U.S. progressive movement.

== Books ==
- Brock, David (1993). The Real Anita Hill: The Untold Story. New York: Free Press. ISBN 978-0-02-904656-2.
- Brock, David (1996). The Seduction of Hillary Rodham (1st pbk. ed.). New York: Free Press. ISBN 978-0-684-83770-3.
- Brock, David (2002). Blinded by the Right: The Conscience of an Ex-Conservative (1st pbk. ed.). New York: Crown Publishing Group. ISBN 978-1-4000-4728-4.
- Brock, David (2004). The Republican Noise Machine: Right-Wing Media and How It Corrupts Democracy (1st ed.). New York: Crown. ISBN 978-1-4000-4875-5.
- Brock, David; Waldman, Paul (2008). Free Ride: John McCain and the Media. New York: Anchor. ISBN 978-0-307-27940-8.
- Brock, David; Rabin-Havt, Ari (2012). The Fox Effect: How Roger Ailes Turned a Network into a Propaganda Machine. New York: Anchor. ISBN 978-0-307-94768-0.
- Brock, David (2015). Killing the Messenger: The Right-Wing Plot to Derail Hillary and Hijack Your Government (1st ed.). New York: Twelve. ISBN 978-1-4555-3376-3.
- Brock, David (2024). Stench: The Making of the Thomas Court and the Unmaking of America (1st ed.). New York: Knopf. ISBN 978-0-5938-0214-4.
