= The Real Anita Hill =

1993 book written and now disavowed by David Brock

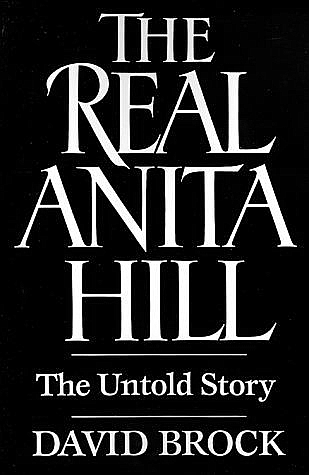
- Author: David Brock
- Language: English
- Subject: Anita Hill
- Genre: Character assassination Propaganda
- Publisher: Free Press
- Publication date: 1993
- Publication place: United States
- ISBN: 978-0029046562
- Followed by: The Seduction of Hillary Rodham

The Real Anita Hill is a controversial 1993 book written by David Brock in which he claimed to reveal the "true motives" of Anita Hill, who had accused Supreme Court Justice Clarence Thomas of sexual harassment during his 1991 confirmation hearings. Brock later revealed he fabricated the motives and has disavowed the book.

== Background ==
In March 1992, Brock had authored a sharply critical story about Hill in The American Spectator magazine which became the nucleus of the book The Real Anita Hill. It was positively reviewed by several people, including George Will in Newsweek, Jonathan Groner, then-associate editor of Legal Times, in The Washington Post ("a serious work of investigative journalism"), and by Christopher Lehmann-Haupt of The New York Times ("carefully reasoned and powerful in its logic"). Excerpts were also printed in the Wall Street Journal. It was negatively reviewed by Jane Mayer and Jill Abramson in The New Yorker, Anna Quindlen in the New York Times, Dierdre English in The Nation, and Anthony Lewis in the New York Times, as well as Molly Ivins, and Ellen Goodman.

== Legacy ==
Brock now describes the book as a "character assassination" and has since "disavowed its premise". He has also apologized to Hill. In his subsequent book, Blinded by the Right, Brock characterized himself as having been "a witting cog in the Republican sleaze machine".
