= Anita Hill =

American law professor and accuser of Clarence Thomas

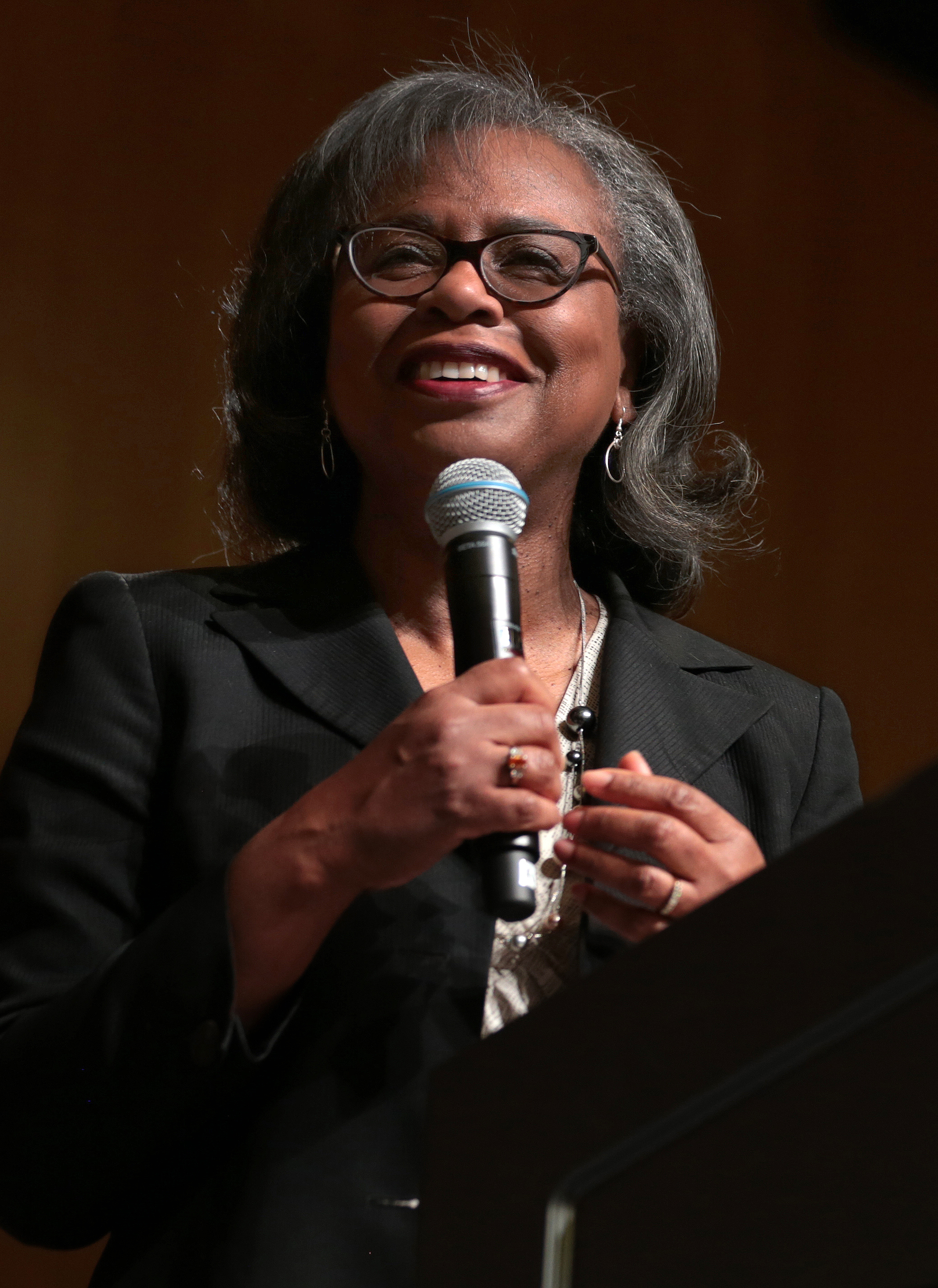
- Hill in 2018
- Born: Anita Faye Hill; July 30, 1956 (age 70); Lone Tree, Oklahoma, U.S.
- Education: Oklahoma State University (BS); Yale University (JD)
- Employer: Brandeis University

Anita Faye Hill (born July 30, 1956) is an American lawyer, educator and author. She is a professor of social policy, law, and women's studies at Brandeis University and a faculty member of the university's Heller School for Social Policy and Management. She became a national figure in 1991 when she accused then-U.S. Supreme Court nominee Clarence Thomas, her supervisor at the United States Department of Education and the Equal Employment Opportunity Commission, of sexual harassment.

== Early life and education ==
Anita Hill was born to a family of farmers in Lone Tree, Oklahoma, the youngest of Albert and Erma Hill's 13 children. Her family came from Arkansas, where her maternal grandfather Henry Eliot and all of her great-grandparents had been born into slavery. Hill was raised in the Baptist faith.

Hill graduated from Morris High School, Oklahoma, in 1973, where she was class valedictorian. Hill received her bachelor's degree in psychology in 1977 from Oklahoma State University, where she was a first-generation college student. In 1980, she earned her Juris Doctor from Yale Law School in New Haven, Connecticut.

== Early career ==
Hill was admitted to the District of Columbia Bar in 1980 and began her law career as an associate with the Washington, D.C. firm of Wald, Harkrader & Ross. In 1981, she became an attorney-adviser to Clarence Thomas, who was then the Assistant Secretary of the U.S. Department of Education's Office for Civil Rights. When Thomas became chairman of the U.S. Equal Employment Opportunity Commission (EEOC) in 1982, Hill served as his assistant, leaving the job in 1983.

Hill then became an assistant professor at the evangelical Christian O. W. Coburn School of Law at Oral Roberts University where she taught from 1983 to 1986. In 1986, she joined the faculty at the University of Oklahoma College of Law where she taught commercial law and contracts.

In 1989, she became the first tenured African American professor at OU. She left the university in 1996 due to ongoing calls for her resignation that began after her 1991 testimony. In 1998, she became a visiting scholar at Brandeis University and, in 2015, a university professor at the school.

== Allegations of sexual harassment against Clarence Thomas ==
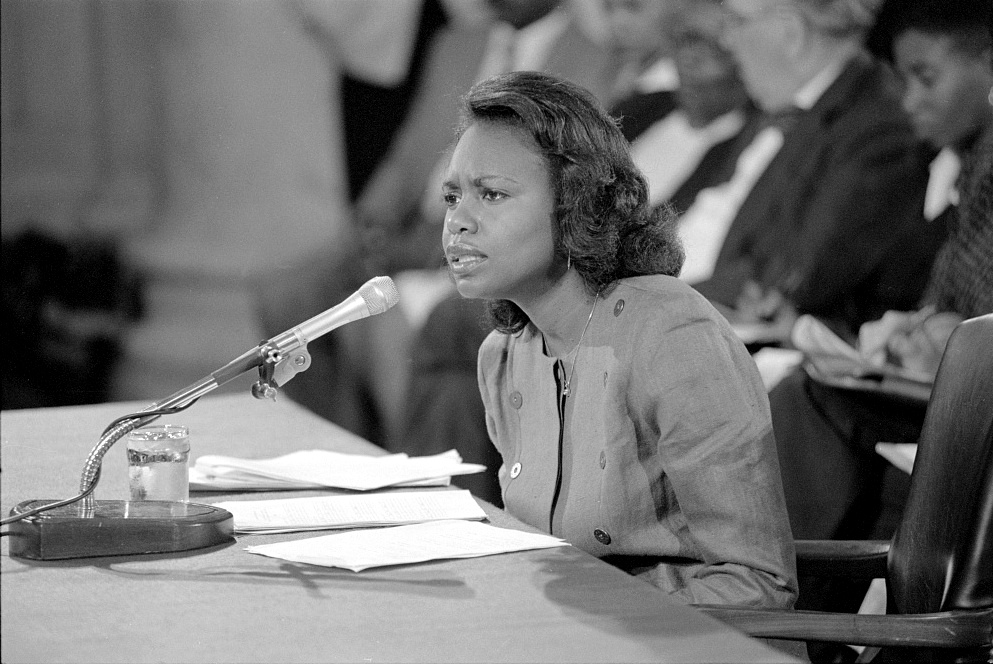
Hill testifying in front of the Senate Judiciary Committee in 1991

In 1991, President George H. W. Bush nominated Clarence Thomas, a federal circuit judge, to succeed retiring Associate Supreme Court Justice Thurgood Marshall. Senate hearings on his confirmation were initially completed with Thomas's good character being presented as a primary qualification for the high court because he had been a judge for just slightly more than one year. There had been little organized opposition to Thomas's nomination, and his confirmation seemed assured until a report of a private interview of Hill by the FBI was leaked to the press. The hearings were then reopened, and Hill was called to testify publicly.

Hill said on October 11, 1991, in televised hearings that Thomas had sexually harassed her while he was her supervisor at the Department of Education and the EEOC. When questioned on why she followed Thomas to the second job after he had already allegedly harassed her, she said working in a reputable position within the civil rights field had been her ambition. She also said in her testimony that she had no other job to go to. The position at the EEOC was appealing enough to keep her from going back into private practice with her previous firm. She said that she realized only later in her life that the choice had represented poor judgment on her part, but that "at that time, it appeared that the sexual overtures... had ended."

According to Hill, Thomas asked her out socially many times during her two years of employment as his assistant, and after she declined his requests, he used work situations to discuss sexual subjects and push advances. "He spoke about... such matters as women having sex with animals and films showing group sex or rape scenes," she said, adding that on several occasions Thomas graphically described "his own sexual prowess" and the details of his anatomy. Hill also recounted an instance in which Thomas examined a can of Coke on his desk and asked, "Who has put pubic hair on my Coke?"

Four female witnesses waited in the wings to support Hill's credibility, but they were not called, due to what the Los Angeles Times described as a private, compromise deal between Republicans and the Senate Judiciary Committee chair, Democrat Joe Biden.

Hill agreed to take a polygraph test. While senators and other authorities agreed that polygraph results cannot be relied upon and are inadmissible in courts, Hill's results did support her statements. Thomas did not take a polygraph test. He made a vehement and complete denial, saying that he was being subjected to a "high-tech lynching for uppity blacks" by white liberals who were seeking to block a black conservative from taking a seat on the Supreme Court. After extensive debate, the United States Senate confirmed Thomas to the Supreme Court by a vote of 52–48, the narrowest margin since the 19th century.

Members questioned Hill's credibility after the timeline of her events came into question. They mentioned the time delay of ten years between the alleged behavior by Thomas and Hill's accusations, and observed that Hill had followed Thomas to a second job and later had personal contacts with Thomas, including giving him a ride to an airport — behavior which they said would be inexplicable if Hill's allegations were true. Hill countered that she had come forward because she felt an obligation to share information on the character and actions of a person who was being considered for the Supreme Court. She testified that after leaving the EEOC, she had had two "inconsequential" phone conversations with Thomas, and had seen him personally on two occasions, once to get a job reference and the second time when he made a public appearance in Oklahoma where she was teaching.

Doubts about the veracity of Hill's 1991 testimony persisted among conservatives long after Thomas took his seat on the Court. They were furthered by right-wing magazine American Spectator writer David Brock in his 1993 book The Real Anita Hill, though he later recanted the claims he had made which he described in his book as "character assassination," and apologized to Hill. After interviewing a number of women who alleged that Thomas had frequently subjected them to sexually explicit remarks, The Wall Street Journal reporters Jane Mayer and Jill Abramson wrote Strange Justice: The Selling of Clarence Thomas, a book that concluded that Thomas had lied during his confirmation process. Richard Lacayo in his 1994 review of the book for Time magazine remarked, however, that "Their book doesn't quite nail that conclusion." In 2007, Kevin Merida, a co-author of another book on Thomas, remarked that what happened between Thomas and Hill was "ultimately unknowable" by others, but that it was clear that "one of them lied, period." Writing in 2007, Neil Lewis of The New York Times remarked that, "To this day, each side in the epic he-said, she-said dispute has its unmovable believers."

In 2007, Thomas published his autobiography, My Grandfather's Son, in which he revisited the controversy, calling Hill his "most traitorous adversary", and writing that pro-choice liberals, who feared he would vote to overturn Roe v. Wade if he were seated on the Supreme Court, used the scandal against him. He described Hill as touchy and apt to overreact, and her work at the EEOC as mediocre. He acknowledged that three other former EEOC employees had backed Hill's story, but said they had all left the agency on bad terms. He also wrote that Hill "was a left-winger who'd never expressed any religious sentiments whatsoever ... and the only reason why she'd held a job in the Reagan administration was because I'd given it to her." Hill denied the accusations in an op-ed in The New York Times saying she would not "stand by silently and allow [Justice Thomas], in his anger, to reinvent me."

In October 2010, Thomas's wife Virginia, a conservative activist, left a voicemail at Hill's office asking that Hill apologize for her 1991 testimony. Hill initially believed the call was a hoax and referred the matter to the Brandeis University campus police who alerted the FBI. After being informed that the call was indeed from Virginia Thomas, Hill told the media that she did not believe the message was meant to be conciliatory and said, "I testified truthfully about my experience and I stand by that testimony." Virginia Thomas responded that the call had been intended as an "olive branch".

=== Effects ===
Shortly after the Thomas confirmation hearings, President George H. W. Bush dropped his opposition to a bill that gave harassment victims the right to seek federal damage awards, back pay, and reinstatement, and the law was passed by Congress. One year later, harassment complaints filed with the EEOC were up 50 percent, and public opinion had shifted in Hill's favor. Private companies also started training programs to deter sexual harassment. When journalist Cinny Kennard asked Hill in 1991 if she would testify against Thomas all over again, Hill answered, "I'm not sure if I could have lived with myself if I had answered those questions any differently."

The manner in which the Senate Judiciary Committee challenged and dismissed Hill's accusations of sexual harassment angered female politicians and lawyers. According to D.C. Congressional Delegate Eleanor Holmes Norton, Hill's treatment by the panel was a contributing factor to the large number of women elected to Congress in 1992. "Women clearly went to the polls with the notion in mind that you had to have more women in Congress," she said. Barbara Smith, co-editor of landmark feminist anthology All the Women Are White, All the Blacks Are Men, but Some of Us Are Brave, described black feminists mobilizing "a remarkable national response to the Anita Hill–Clarence Thomas controversy."

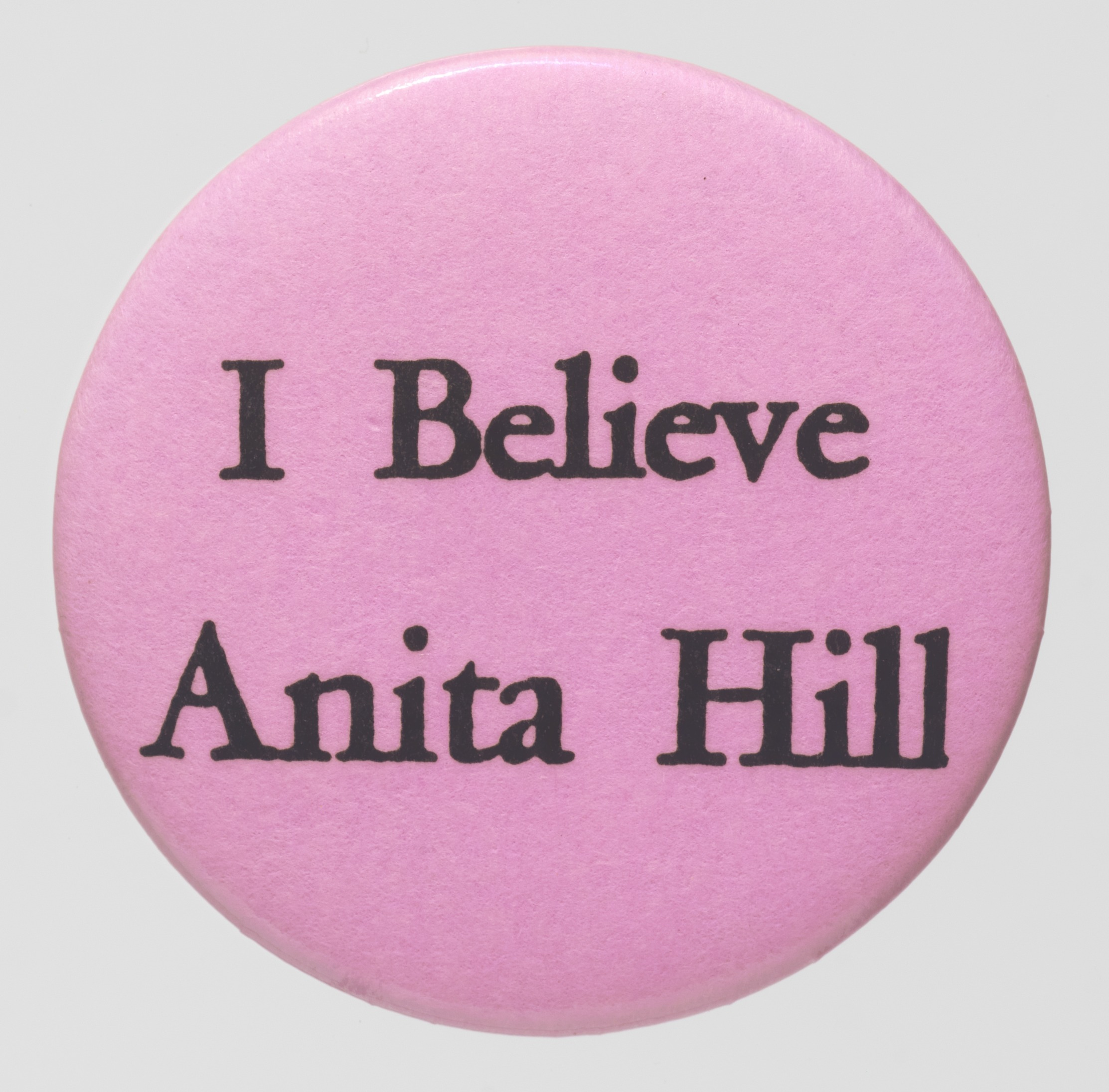
"I Believe Anita Hill" Pin Back Button

In 1992, a feminist group began a nationwide fundraising campaign and then obtained matching state funds to endow a professorship at the University of Oklahoma College of Law in honor of Hill. Conservative Oklahoma state legislators reacted by demanding Hill's resignation from the university, then introducing a bill to prohibit the university from accepting donations from out-of-state residents, and finally attempting to pass legislation to close down the law school. Elmer Zinn Million, a local activist, compared Hill to Lee Harvey Oswald, the assassin of President Kennedy. Certain officials at the university attempted to revoke Hill's tenure. After five years of pressure, Hill resigned. The University of Oklahoma Law School defunded the Anita F. Hill professorship in May 1999, without the position having ever been filled.

On April 25, 2019, the presidential campaign team for Joe Biden for the 2020 United States presidential election disclosed that he had called Hill to express "his regret for what she endured" in his role as the chairman of the Senate Judiciary Committee, presiding over the Thomas confirmation hearings. Hill said the call from Biden left her feeling "deeply unsatisfied". On June 13, 2019, Hill clarified that she did not consider Biden's actions disqualifying, and would be open to voting for him. In May 2020, Hill argued that sexual assault allegations made against Donald Trump as well as the sexual assault allegation against Biden should be investigated and their results "made available to the public."

On September 5, 2020, it was reported that Hill had vowed to vote for Biden and to work with him on gender issues.

== Continued work and advocacy ==
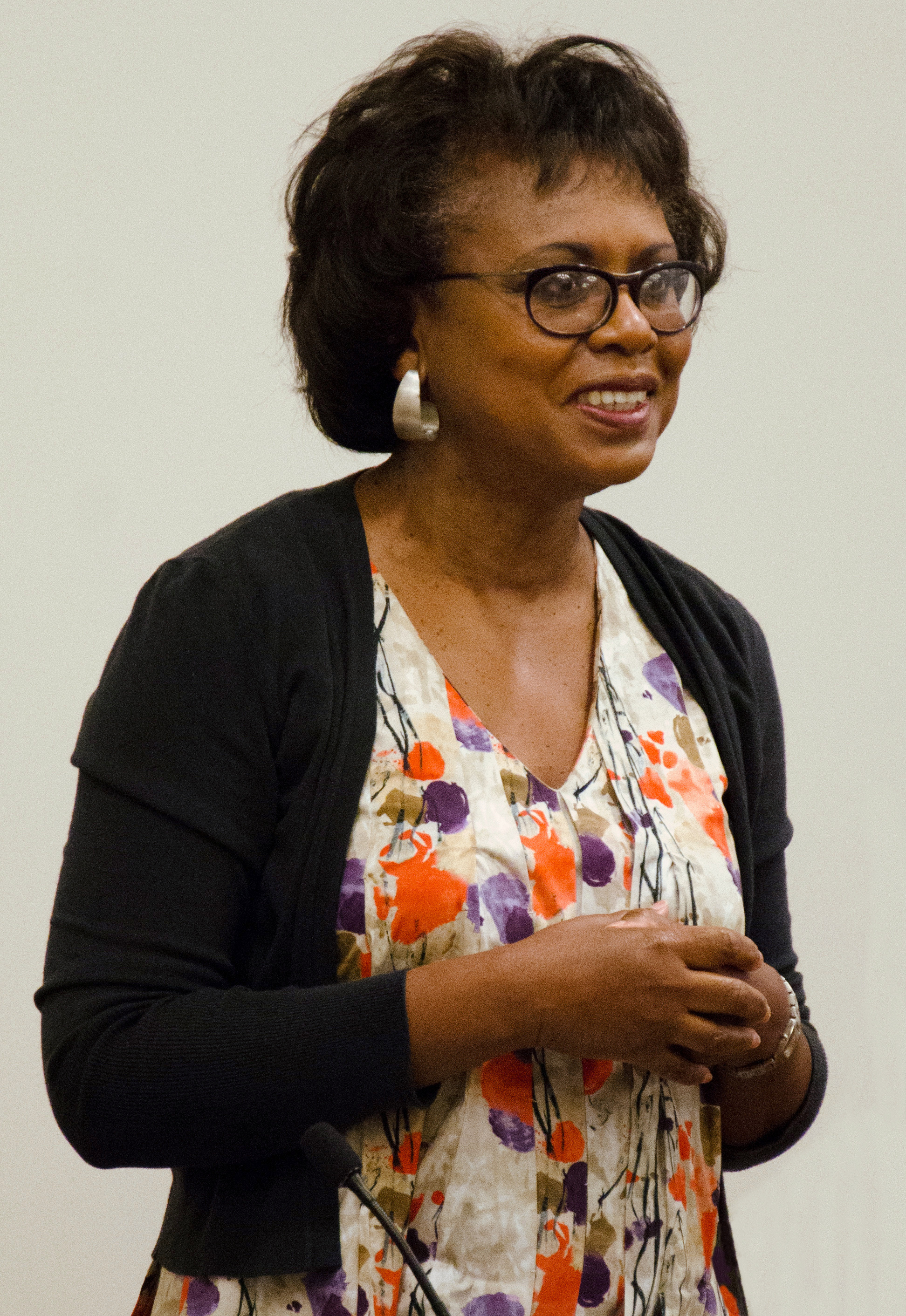
Hill in 2014 speaking at Harvard Law School

Hill continued to teach at the University of Oklahoma, though she spent two years as a visiting professor in California. She resigned her post in October 1996 and finished her final semester of teaching there. In her final semester, she taught a law school seminar on civil rights. An endowed chair was created in her name, but was later defunded without ever having been filled.

Hill accepted a position as a visiting scholar at the Institute for the Study of Social Change at University of California, Berkeley in January 1997, but soon joined the faculty of Brandeis University—first at the Women's Studies Program, later moving to the Heller School for Social Policy and Management. In 2011, she also took a counsel position with the Civil Rights & Employment Practice group of the plaintiffs' law firm Cohen Milstein.

Over the years, Hill has provided commentary on gender and race issues on national television programs, including 60 Minutes, Face the Nation, and Meet the Press. She has been a speaker on the topic of commercial law as well as race and women's rights. She is also the author of articles that have been published in The New York Times and Newsweek and has contributed to many scholarly and legal publications in the areas of international commercial law, bankruptcy, and civil rights.

In 1995, Hill co-edited Race, Gender and Power in America: The Legacy of the Hill-Thomas Hearings with Emma Coleman Jordan. In 1997 Hill published her autobiography, Speaking Truth to Power, in which she chronicled her role in the Clarence Thomas confirmation controversy and wrote that creating a better society had been a motivating force in her life. She contributed the piece "The Nature of the Beast: Sexual Harassment" to the 2003 anthology Sisterhood Is Forever: The Women's Anthology for a New Millennium, edited by Robin Morgan. In 2011, Hill published her second book, Reimagining Equality: Stories of Gender, Race, and Finding Home, which focuses on the sub-prime lending crisis that resulted in the foreclosure of many homes owned by African-Americans. She calls for a new understanding about the importance of a home and its place in the American Dream. On March 26, 2015, the Brandeis Board of Trustees unanimously voted to recognize Hill with a promotion to University Professor of Social Policy, Law, and Women's Studies.

On December 16, 2017, the Commission on Sexual Harassment and Advancing Equality in the Workplace was formed, selecting Hill to lead its charge against sexual harassment in the entertainment industry. The new initiative was spearheaded by co-chair of the Nike Foundation Maria Eitel, venture capitalist Freada Kapor Klein, Lucasfilm President Kathleen Kennedy and talent attorney Nina Shaw. The report found not only a saddening prevalence of continued bias but also stark differences in how varying demographics perceived discrimination and harassment.

In September 2018, Hill wrote an op-ed in The New York Times regarding sexual assault allegations made by Christine Blasey Ford during the Brett Kavanaugh Supreme Court nomination. On November 8, 2018, Anita Hill spoke at the USC Dornsife event "From Social Movement to Social Impact: Putting an End to Sexual Harassment in the Workplace."

== Writings ==
External videos
- Booknotes interview with Hill on Speaking Truth to Power, November 23, 1997, C-SPAN (58:21)

In 1994, Hill wrote a tribute to Thurgood Marshall, the first African American Supreme Court Justice who preceded Clarence Thomas, titled "A Tribute to Thurgood Marshall: A Man Who Broke with Tradition on Issues of Race and Gender". She outlined Marshall's contributions to the principles of equality as a judge and how his work has affected the lives of African Americans, specifically African American women.

On October 20, 1998, Hill published the book Speaking Truth to Power. Throughout much of the book she gives details on her side of the sexual harassment controversy, and her professional relationship with Clarence Thomas. Aside from that, she also provides a glimpse of what her personal life was like all the way from her childhood days growing up in Oklahoma to her position as a law professor.

Hill became a proponent for women's rights and feminism. This can be seen through the chapter she wrote in the 2007 book Women and leadership: the state of play and strategies for change. She wrote about women judges and why, in her opinion, they play such a large role in balancing the judicial system. She argues that since women and men have different life experiences, ways of thinking, and histories, both are needed for a balanced court system. She writes that in order for the best law system to be created in the United States, all people need the ability to be represented.

In 2011, Hill's second book, Reimagining Equality: Stories of Gender, Race, and Finding Home was published. She discusses the relationship between the home and the American Dream. She also exposes the inequalities within gender and race and home ownership. She argues that inclusive democracy is more important than debates about legal rights. She uses her own history and history of other African American women such as Nannie Helen Burroughs, in order to strengthen her argument for reimagining equality altogether.

On September 28, 2021, Hill published the book Believing: Our Thirty-Year Journey to End Gender Violence.

== Awards and recognition ==
Hill received the American Bar Association's Commission on Women in the Profession's "Women of Achievement" award in 1992. In 2005, Hill was selected as a Fletcher Foundation Fellow. In 2008 she was awarded the Louis P. and Evelyn Smith First Amendment Award by the Ford Hall Forum. She also serves on the board of trustees for Southern Vermont College in Bennington, Vermont. She was inducted into the Oklahoma Women's Hall of Fame in 1993. On January 7, 2017, Hill was inducted as an honorary member of Zeta Phi Beta sorority at their National Executive Board Meeting in Dallas, Texas. In 2019, Time created 89 new covers to celebrate women of the year starting from 1920; it chose Hill for 1991. The Wing's Washington, D.C. location has a phone booth dedicated to Hill.

Minor planet 6486 Anitahill, discovered by Eleanor Helin, is named in her honor. The official naming citation was published by the Minor Planet Center on November 8, 2019 (M.P.C. 117229).

=== Honorary doctorates ===
- 2001: Simmons University
- 2001: Dillard University
- 2003: Smith College
- 2007: Lasell University
- 2008: Massachusetts College of Liberal Arts
- 2013: Mount Ida College
- 2017: Emerson College
- 2018: Wesleyan University
- 2019: Lesley University
- 2022: Mount Holyoke College

== See also ==
- Clarence Thomas Supreme Court nomination
- Brett Kavanaugh Supreme Court nomination
- Christine Blasey Ford
