= It Can Happen Here =

It Can Happen Here may refer to:

- It Can Happen Here (Conason book), 2007 book by Joe Conason arguing that the US government was trending towards authoritarianism
- It Can Happen Here (Hinton book), 2021 book about white supremacy by Alexander Laban Hinton

== See also ==
- It Can't Happen Here
- Can't Happen Here (disambiguation)
- Search Wikipedia for "It Can Happen Here"
