= It Can't Happen Here =

1935 dystopian novel by Sinclair Lewis

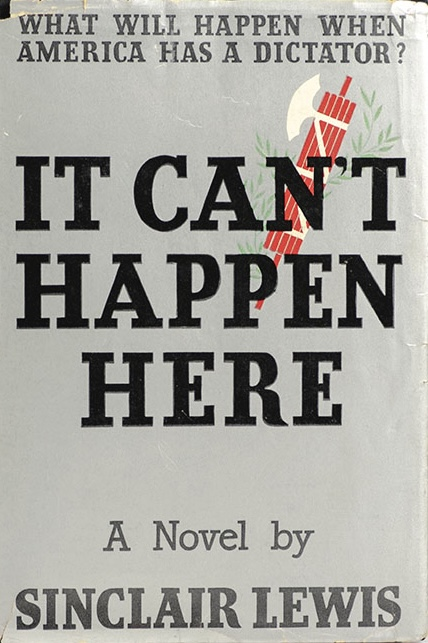
- First edition cover
- Author: Sinclair Lewis
- Language: English
- Genre: Political fiction Dystopian fiction
- Publisher: Doubleday, Doran and Company
- Publication date: October 21, 1935
- Publication place: United States
- Media type: Print (hardcover)
- Pages: 458 pp.
- ISBN: 045121658X

It Can't Happen Here is a 1935 dystopian political novel by the American author Sinclair Lewis. Set in a fictionalized version of the 1930s United States, it follows an American politician, Berzelius "Buzz" Windrip, who quickly rises to power to become the country's first outright dictator (in allusion to Adolf Hitler's rise to power in Nazi Germany), and Doremus Jessup, a newspaper editor who sees Windrip's fascist policies for what they are ahead of time and who becomes Windrip's most ardent critic.

The novel was adapted into a play by Lewis and John C. Moffitt in 1936.

== Premise ==
It Can't Happen Here was published during the heyday of fascism in Europe, which was reported on by Dorothy Thompson, Lewis's wife. The novel describes the rise of Berzelius "Buzz" Windrip, a demagogue who is elected President of the United States, after fomenting fear and promising drastic economic and social reforms while promoting a return to patriotism and "traditional" values. After his election, Windrip takes complete control of the government via self-coup and imposes totalitarian rule with the help of a ruthless paramilitary force, in the manner of European fascists such as Adolf Hitler and Benito Mussolini. The novel's plot centers on journalist Doremus Jessup's opposition to the new regime and his subsequent struggle against it as part of a liberal rebellion.

== Plot ==
In 1936, American Senator Berzelius "Buzz" Windrip enters the presidential election campaign on a populist platform, promising to restore the country to prosperity and greatness, and promising each citizen $5,000 per year (equivalent to $116,000 in 2025). Portraying himself as a champion of "the forgotten man" and "traditional" American values, Windrip defeats incumbent President Franklin D. Roosevelt for the Democratic nomination, and then beats his Republican opponent, Senator Walt Trowbridge, in the November election.

Having previously foreshadowed some authoritarian measures to reorganize the government, Windrip outlaws dissent, incarcerates political enemies in concentration camps, and trains and arms a paramilitary force called the "Minute Men" (named after the Revolutionary War militias of the same name), who terrorize citizens and enforce the policies of a corporatist regime. One of Windrip's first acts as president is to eliminate the influence of Congress, which draws the ire of many citizens as well as the legislators themselves. The Minute Men respond to protests harshly, attacking demonstrators with bayonets.

In addition to these actions, Windrip's administration, known as the "Corpo" government, curtails women's and minority rights, and eliminates individual states by subdividing the country into administrative sectors. The government of these sectors is managed by Corpo authorities, usually prominent businessmen or Minute Men officers. Those accused of crimes against the government appear before kangaroo courts presided over by military judges. A majority of Americans approve of these dictatorial measures, seeing them as painful but necessary steps to restore American power.

Open opponents of Windrip, led by Senator Trowbridge, form an organization called the New Underground (named after the Underground Railroad), helping dissidents escape to Canada and distributing anti-Windrip propaganda. One recruit to the New Underground is Doremus Jessup, a Fort Beulah, Vermont newspaper editor who is a traditional liberal and an opponent of both corporatism and communism, the latter being suppressed by Windrip's administration. Jessup's participation in the organization results in the publication of The Vermont Vigilance, a periodical in which he writes editorials decrying Windrip's abuses of power.

Doremus' family suffers from their resistance to Windrip. Doremus' son-in-law, Fowler Greenhill, a doctor, resists aristocratic military judge Effingham Swan, who then has him killed. Greenhill's spirited wife Mary, Doremus' elder daughter, becomes depressed, but eventually gets her revenge by becoming a military pilot and suicide-attacking Swan's plane, killing herself and Swan and his entourage.

Meanwhile, Doremus' son Philip joins the Corpo regime as a military judge himself, to his father's dismay. Doremus' wife Emma shows only limp opposition to the Corpos, unlike Lorinda Pike, Doremus' secret lover and a local feminist/social activist, who fights Windrip tooth and nail. However, the Underground transfers her to other posts far away from Doremus, so the two regretfully part, though they re-encounter from time to time.

Shad Ledue, the local district commissioner and Doremus' former hired man, resents his old employer. After discovering Jessup's actions, Ledue has him sent to a concentration camp, where he is abused and tortured. Ledue terrorizes Doremus' family and particularly his younger daughter Sissy, whom he unsuccessfully attempts to seduce. (Sissy is dating Julian Falck, a college student who eventually joins the Minute Men as a spy for the Underground.) Sissy discovers evidence of corrupt dealings on the part of Ledue, which she exposes to Francis Tasbrough, a one-time friend of Doremus, and Ledue's superior in the administrative hierarchy.

Tasbrough has Ledue imprisoned in the same camp as Doremus, where inmates sent there by Ledue organize Ledue's murder. Doremus eventually escapes when his friends bribe one of the camp guards. He flees to Canada and rejoins the New Underground. He later serves the organization as a spy, passing along information and urging locals to resist Windrip.

In time, Windrip's hold on power weakens as his promised economic prosperity fails to materialize, and increasing numbers of disillusioned Americans, including Vice President Perley Beecroft, flee the country. Windrip also angers his secretly-gay Secretary of State, Lee Sarason, who had served earlier as his chief political operative and adviser. Sarason and Windrip's other lieutenants, including General Dewey Haik, seize power and exile the president to France. Sarason succeeds Windrip, but his extravagant and relatively weak rule creates a power vacuum in which Haik and others vie for power.

In a putsch, Haik leads a party of military supporters into the White House, kills Sarason and his associates, and proclaims himself president. The two coups cause a slow erosion of Corpo power. Haik's government tries to arouse patriotism by launching an invasion of Mexico, slandering the country in state-run newspapers and ordering a mass conscription of young American men, infuriating many who had until then been Corpo loyalists. Riots and rebellions break out across the country, with many realizing the Corpos have misled them.

General Emmanuel Coon, one of Haik's senior officers, defects to the opposition with a large portion of his army, giving strength to the resistance movement. Although Haik remains in control of much of the country, a civil war soon breaks out as the resistance tries to consolidate its grasp on the Midwest. As the conflict begins, Doremus works as an agent for the New Underground in Corpo-occupied portions of southern Minnesota; the final words of the novel are that "a Doremus Jessup can never die."

== Reception ==
Reviewers at the time, and historians and literary critics ever since, have emphasized the resemblance to Louisiana politician Huey Long, who used strong-arm political tactics and who was building a nationwide "Share Our Wealth" organization in preparing to run for president in the 1936 election. Long was assassinated in 1935 just prior to the novel's publication. The inspiration for Windrip backer Bishop Prang was renowned radio priest Charles Coughlin, who in real life conspired with Long to oust Roosevelt in the 1936 U.S. presidential election.

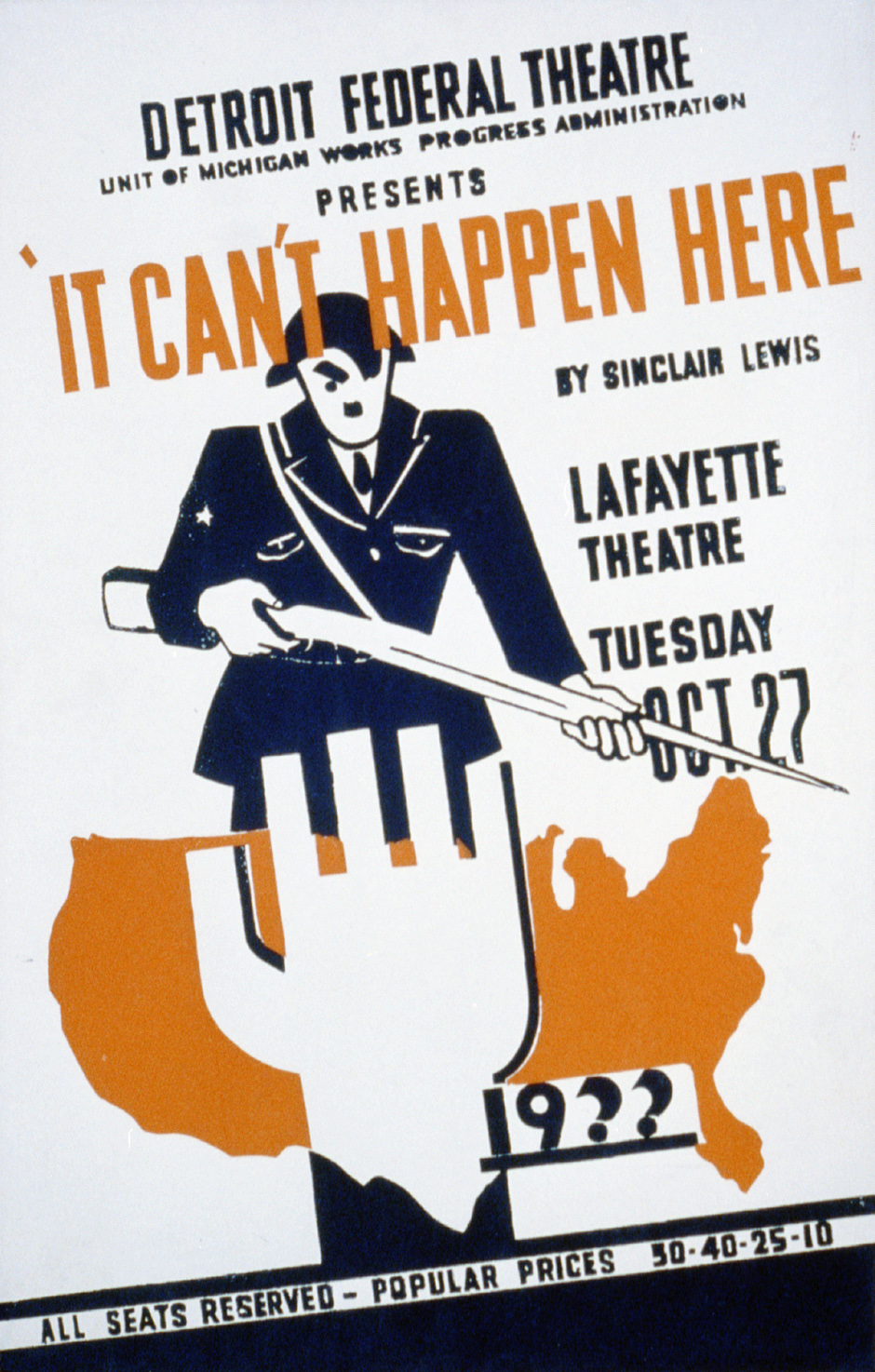
Poster for the stage adaptation of It Can't Happen Here, October 27, 1936, at the Lafayette Theater as part of the Detroit Federal Theatre

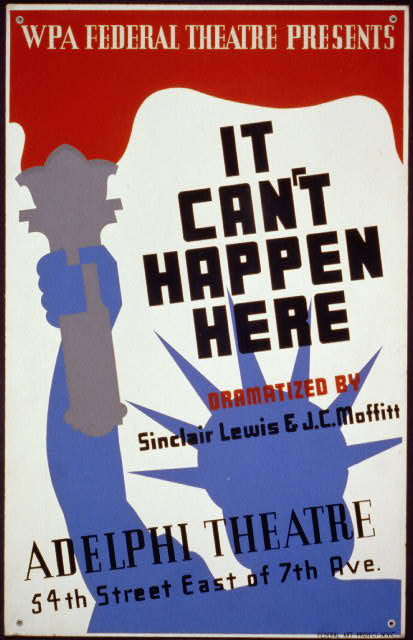
Poster for the Federal Theatre Project presentation of It Can't Happen Here at the Adelphi Theatre in New York City, showing the Statue of Liberty

According to Boulard (1998), "the most chilling and uncanny treatment of Huey by a writer came with Sinclair Lewis's It Can't Happen Here." Lewis portrayed a genuine U.S. dictator on the Hitler model. Starting in 1936, the Works Progress Administration, a New Deal agency, performed the stage adaptation across the country; Lewis had the goal of hurting Long's chances in the 1936 election.

Keith Perry argues that the key weakness of the novel is not that he decks out U.S. politicians with sinister European touches, but that he finally conceives of fascism and totalitarianism in terms of traditional U.S. political models rather than seeing them as introducing a new kind of society and a new kind of regime. Windrip is less a Nazi than a con-man-plus-Rotarian, a manipulator who knows how to appeal to people's desperation, but neither he nor his followers are in the grip of the kind of world-transforming ideology like Hitler's Nazism.

== Adaptations ==
=== Stage ===
In 1936, Lewis and John C. Moffitt wrote a stage version, also titled It Can't Happen Here, which is still produced. The stage version premiered on October 27, 1936, in 21 U.S. theaters in 17 states simultaneously, in productions sponsored by the Federal Theatre Project.

The Z Collective, a San Francisco theater company, adapted the novel for the stage, producing it both in 1989 and 1992. In 2004, Z Space adapted the Collective's script into a radio drama that was broadcast on the Pacifica radio network on the anniversary of the Federal Theatre Project's original premiere.

A new stage adaptation by Tony Taccone and Bennett S. Cohen premiered at the Berkeley Repertory Theatre in September 2016.

=== Unfinished film ===
Metro-Goldwyn-Mayer (MGM) purchased the rights in late 1935 for a reported $200,000 from seeing the galley proofs, with Lucien Hubbard (Wings) as the producer. By early 1936, screenwriter Sidney Howard completed an adaptation, his third of Lewis's novels. J. Walter Ruben was named to direct the film with the cast headed by Lionel Barrymore, Walter Connolly, Virginia Bruce, and Basil Rathbone. Studio head Louis B. Mayer indefinitely postponed production, citing costs, to the publicly announced pleasure of the Nazi regime in Germany. Lewis and Howard countered that financial reason with information pointing to Berlin's and Rome's influence on movies. Will H. Hays, responsible for the enforcement of the Motion Picture Production Code, had notified Mayer of potential problems in the German market. Joseph Breen, head of the Production Code Administration department under Hays, thought the script was too "anti-fascist" and "so filled with dangerous material".

In December 1938, Charlie Chaplin announced his next movie would satirize Hitler (The Great Dictator). MGM's Hubbard "dusted off the script" in January, but the "idea of a dictator ruling America" had now been discussed in public for years. Hubbard rewrote a new climax, "showing a dictatorship in Washington and showing it being kicked out by disgruntled Americans as soon as they realized what had happened." The film was placed back on the production schedule for the third time with shooting starting in June and Lewis Stone playing Doremus Jessup. By July 1939, MGM "admitted it would not make the movie after all" to some criticism.

=== Television ===
The 1968 television movie Shadow on the Land, which also went by the title United States: It Can't Happen Here, was produced by Screen Gems as a backdoor pilot for a series. The TV movie, a thriller which takes place following the fascist takeover, is often cited as an adaptation of Lewis's novel but does not credit the novel.

Inspired by the book, director–producer Kenneth Johnson in 1982 scripted a miniseries entitled Storm Warnings. NBC executives, to whom Johnson presented the script, rejected the original, which they considered too cerebral for the average American viewer. To make the script more marketable, Storm Warnings was revised into a far less subtle alien invasion story in which the invaders initially pose as humanity's friends, but prove to be a genocidal militaristic power with thinly disguised Nazi trappings intent on draining the planet of its water and using humanity predominantly as a food source. The new script formed the basis for the popular miniseries V, which premiered May 3, 1983.

=== Radio ===
A four-part radio adaptation of the 2016 Berkeley Repertory Theatre stage version aired on public radio stations and on YouTube from October 13 through November 8, 2020, during the run-up to the Presidential election. Among the cast members were David Strathairn as Doremus Jessup. The free broadcast was "envisioned in part as a get-out-the-vote initiative."

A six-part radio play version based on the book titled "It Happened Here 2024" started airing on October 2, 2024, in the United States, produced by WNYC Studios, a New York City NPR affiliate. Starring the voice talents of Tony Shalhoub, Edie Falco and John Turturro it adapts both the original book by Lewis and Richard Dresser's novel, "It Happened Here." The story revolves around the impacts of the rise of a fascist dictator in America, who is called "The Great Leader," and how the family and country were torn asunder by white nationalist violence and extremism. Episodes 1 and 2 were released on October 2 and the series plays on the NPR On the Media podcast.

A British adaptation of the book for BBC Radio 4 aired on October 5, 2024. It stars Ben Miles as Jessup and Nathan Osgood as Windrip.

== Legacy ==
Since its publication, It Can't Happen Here has been seen as a cautionary tale, starting with the 1936 presidential election and potential candidate Huey Long.

In retrospect, Franklin D. Roosevelt's internment of Japanese Americans during World War II has been used as an example of "It can happen here," despite nominally being a measure against the fascistic Empire of Japan.

Frank Zappa and The Mothers of Invention released their first album Freak Out! in 1966 with the song "It Can't Happen Here".

In May 1973, in the middle of the Watergate scandal, Knight Newspapers published an ad in their own and other publications, headlined "It Can't Happen Here" and emphasizing the importance of a free press: "There is a struggle going on in this country. It is not just a fight by reporters and editors to protect their sources. It is a fight to protect the public's right to know. [...] It can't happen here as long as the press remains an open conduit through which public information flows." Herbert Mitgang in his op-ed piece said "The headline of this ad is the title of a novel that keeps insinuating itself these days, not because of its literary qualities but because of its prescience." And that Lewis's point was "that home‐grown hypocrisy leads to a nice brand of home‐grown authoritarianism."

Joe Conason's non-fiction book It Can Happen Here: Authoritarian Peril in the Age of Bush (2007) frequently quotes Lewis's book in relation to the presidency of George W. Bush.

=== Presidency of Donald Trump ===
Several writers have compared the demagogue Buzz Windrip to Donald Trump. Michael Paulson wrote in The New York Times that the Berkeley Repertory Theatre's 2016 rendition of the play aimed to provoke discussion about Trump's presidential candidacy. Writing for The Guardian, Jules Stewart discussed the similarities between Trump's America with the country as depicted in the book. In Salon, Malcolm Harris stated: "Like Trump, Windrip uses a lack of tact as a way to distinguish himself" and "The social forces that Windrip and Trump invoke aren’t funny, they’re murderous." In The Washington Post, Carlos Lozada compared Trump to Windrip, opining that "it is impossible to miss the similarities between Trump and totalitarian figures in American literature." Jacob Weisberg wrote in Slate that one "can't read Lewis's novel today without flashes of Trumpian recognition." Following the results of the 2016 United States presidential election, sales of It Can't Happen Here surged significantly, and it appeared on Amazon.com's list of bestselling books. Penguin Modern Classics released a new edition of the novel on January 20, 2017, the same day as the inauguration of Donald Trump.

In 2018, HarperCollins published Can It Happen Here? Authoritarianism in America, a collection of essays about the prospect of authoritarianism in the United States, edited by Cass Sunstein. In 2019, Robert Evans produced the podcast series It Could Happen Here, which speculated on the causes and consequences of a hypothetical second American Civil War. In 2021, New York University Press published a book It Can Happen Here: White Power and the Rising Threat of Genocide in the US by genocide scholar Alexander Laban Hinton. Hinton argued that "there is a real risk of violent atrocities happening in the United States".

== Similar works ==
Books

- Atwood, Margaret (1985). The Handmaid's Tale. Dystopian novel set in a near-future fundamentalist New England.
- Butler, Octavia (1998). Parable of the Talents. Dystopian science-fiction novel sometimes said to predict the rise of Donald Trump's presidency.
- Conason, Joe (2007). It Can Happen Here: Authoritarian Peril in the Age of Bush. Nonfiction book.
- Dick, Philip K. (1962). The Man in the High Castle. A post World War II alternative history, where Nazi Germany and Imperial Japan are in control of America and the world.
- Jameson, Storm (1936). In the Second Year. Book about a fascist Britain.
- Knebel, Fletcher; Bailey II, Charles W. (1962). Seven Days in May. A novel about an attempted military coup in the United States government.
- London, Jack (1908). The Iron Heel. American dystopian novel.
- Moore, Alan; Lloyd, David (illustrator); Weare, Tony (additional art) (May 1982 – March 1988). V for Vendetta. British graphic novel about a terrorist overthrowing a post-apocalyptic fascist Britain.
- Mullin, Chris (1982). A Very British Coup. A novel by a British Labour politician about the derailing of a left wing governments plans for withdrawal from NATO, the removal of American military bases from British soil and unilateral nuclear disarmament
- Roth, Philip (2004). The Plot Against America. Alternate history novel in which Charles Lindbergh defeats Roosevelt in 1940 and begins antisemitic and pro-German policies.
- Sunstein, Cass (2018). Can It Happen Here?: Authoritarianism in America. HarperCollins. ISBN 978-0062696212. Collection of essays.
- Walton, Jo (2006–2008). The "Small Change" trilogy (Farthing, Ha'penny and Half a Crown). An alternate history trilogy where a fascist government takes over Great Britain.

Films & television

- A Very British Coup novel adaptions on TV:
  - A Very British Coup (1988), screenwriter Alan Plater, director Mick Jackson
  - Secret State (2012), a four-part mini-series inspired by the novel
- It Happened Here (1964; also known as It Happened Here: The Story of Hitler's England), a black-and white film about a fictitious fascist government in Britain during World War II.
- The Plot Against America, a 2020 alternate history drama television miniseries by David Simon and Ed Burns, based on the novel of the same name.
