= Harold Wilson plot allegations =

Conspiracy theories involving the UK Prime Minister

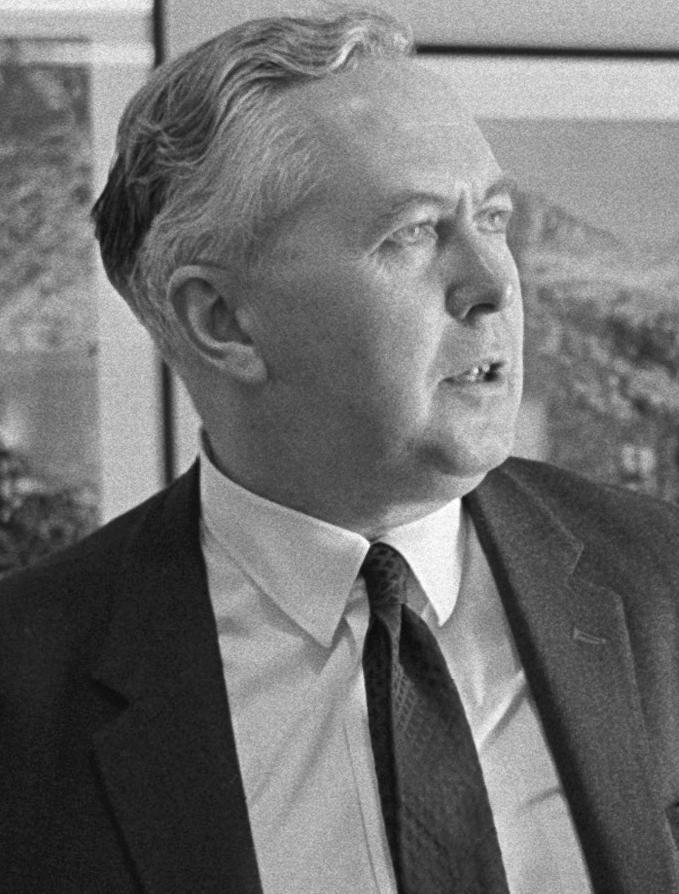
Harold Wilson (1964)

Since the mid-1970s, a variety of allegations have emerged regarding British Labour prime minister Harold Wilson, who served as the prime minister of the United Kingdom from 1964 to 1970 and 1974 to 1976. These range from Wilson having been a Soviet agent (a claim which MI5 investigated and found to be false), to Wilson being the victim of treasonous plots by conservative-leaning elements in MI5 and the British military (e.g., the Clockwork Orange plot), claims which Wilson himself made.

== Background ==
Soviet defector Anatoliy Golitsyn is said to have told a British intelligence officer that Wilson was a KGB operative and that former Labour Party leader Hugh Gaitskell had been assassinated by the KGB to have the pro-US Gaitskell replaced as party leader by Wilson. However, Christopher Andrew, the official historian for Britain's MI5, has described Golitsyn as an "unreliable conspiracy theorist".

In his memoir Spycatcher (1987), former MI5 officer Peter Wright stated that the head of the CIA's Counterintelligence Division, James Angleton, told him that Wilson was a Soviet agent when Wilson became Prime Minister after the 1964 general election. Wright said that Angleton referred to this assertion coming from a source (whom he did not name but who was probably Golitsyn). Golitsyn's words had been frequently taken heed of by Angleton, who had grown suspicious of the loyalty of many political figures, such as Henry Kissinger. According to Wright, Angleton offered to provide further information on the condition that MI5 guarantee to keep the allegations from "political circles", but the management of MI5 declined to accept restrictions on the use of the information and Angleton told them nothing more.

According to Wright, at the end of the 1960s MI5 received information from two Czechoslovak defectors, Josef Frolík and František August, who had fled to the West, alleging the Labour Party had "almost certainly" been penetrated by the Soviets. The two gave a list of Labour MPs and trade unionists as Soviet agents.

MI5 maintained a file on Wilson under the name of Henry Worthington. It repeatedly investigated him over the course of several decades, before officially concluding that Wilson had had no relationship with the KGB, nor did it ever find evidence of Soviet penetration of the Labour Party.

== The 1968 plot ==
In his 1976 memoir Walking on the Water, Hugh Cudlipp recounts a meeting he arranged at the request of Cecil King, the head of the International Publishing Corporation (IPC), between King and Lord Mountbatten of Burma, Prince Charles' great uncle and then-mentor. The meeting took place on 8 May 1968. Attending were Mountbatten, King, Cudlipp, and Sir Solly Zuckerman, the Chief Scientific Adviser to the British government.

According to Cudlipp:

[Cecil] awaited the arrival of Sir Solly and then at once expounded his views on the gravity of the national situation, the urgency for action, and then embarked upon a shopping list of the Prime Minister's shortcomings. He explained that in the crisis he foresaw as being just around the corner, the Government would disintegrate, there would be bloodshed in the streets and the armed forces would be involved. The people would be looking to somebody like Lord Mountbatten as the titular head of a new administration, somebody renowned as a leader of men, who would be capable, backed by the best brains and administrators in the land, to restore public confidence. He ended with a question to Mountbatten—would he agree to be the titular head of a new administration in such circumstances?

Mountbatten asked for the opinion of Zuckerman, who stated that the plan amounted to treason and left the room. Mountbatten expressed the same opinion, and King and Cudlipp left. King subsequently decided to override the editorial independence of the Daily Mirror when he instructed the paper to publish a front-page article he had written that called for Wilson to be removed through some sort of extra-parliamentary action. The board of the IPC met and demanded his resignation for this breach of procedure and the damage to the interests of IPC as a public company. He refused, so was dismissed by the board on 30 May 1968.

In addition to Mountbatten's refusal to participate in King's mooted plot, there is no evidence of any other conspirators. Cudlipp himself appears to see the meeting as an example of extreme egotism on King's part.

A later memoir by Harold Evans, who was editor of The Sunday Times in 1968, said that The Times had egged on King's plans for a coup:

Rees-Mogg's Times backed the Conservative Party in every general election, but it periodically expressed yearnings for a coalition of the right-centre. In the late 1960s it encouraged Cecil King's notion of a coup against Harold Wilson's Labour Government in favour of a government of business leaders led by Lord Robens. In the autumn election of 1974, it predicted that economic crisis would produce a coalition government of national unity well inside five years and urged one there and then between Conservatives and Liberals.

William Rees-Mogg called for a coalition in an 8 December 1968 Times editorial entitled "The Danger to Britain", a day before King visited the Times office.

A BBC programme The Plot Against Harold Wilson, broadcast in 2006, reported that, in tapes recorded soon after his resignation, Wilson stated that for eight months of his premiership he did not "feel he knew what was going on, fully, in security". Wilson alleged two plots, in the late 1960s and mid-1970s respectively. He said that plans had been hatched to install Lord Mountbatten as interim prime minister. He also claimed that ex-military leaders had been building up private armies in anticipation of "wholesale domestic liquidation". On a separate track, elements within MI5 had also, the BBC programme reported, spread black propaganda that Wilson and Marcia Williams (Wilson's private secretary) were Soviet agents, and that Wilson was an IRA sympathiser, apparently with the intention of helping the Conservatives win the February 1974 election.

== Alleged 1974 military coup plot ==
On the BBC television programme The Plot Against Harold Wilson, broadcast on 16 March 2006 on BBC2, it was claimed there were threats of a coup d'état against the Wilson government, which were corroborated by leading figures of the time on both the left and the right. Wilson told two BBC journalists, Barrie Penrose and Roger Courtiour, who recorded the meetings on a cassette tape recorder, that he feared he was being undermined by MI5. The first time was in the late 1960s after the Wilson Government devalued the pound sterling but the threat faded after Conservative leader Edward Heath won the election of 1970. However, after a coal miners' strike Heath decided to hold an election to renew his mandate to govern in February 1974 but lost narrowly to Wilson. There was again talk of a military coup, with rumours of Lord Mountbatten as head of an interim administration after Wilson had been deposed. In 1974 the army occupied Heathrow Airport on the grounds of training for possible IRA terrorist action at the airport. Although the military stated that this was a planned military exercise, Downing Street was not informed in advance, and Wilson himself interpreted it as a show of strength, or warning, being made by the army.

== The Peter Wright allegations ==
Peter Wright claimed that he was confronted by two of his MI5 colleagues and that they said to him: "Wilson's a bloody menace and it's about time the public knew the truth", and "We'll have him out, this time we'll have him out." Wright alleged that there was a plan to leak damaging information about Wilson and that this had been approved by "up to thirty officers". As the 1974 election approached, the plan went, MI5 would leak selective details of the intelligence about Labour leaders, especially Wilson, to "sympathetic" journalists. According to Wright, MI5 would use their contacts in the press and the trade unions to spread around the idea that Wilson was considered a security risk. The matter was to be raised in Parliament for "maximum effect". However Wright declined to let them see the files on Wilson and the plan was never carried out; but Wright does claim it was a "carbon copy" of the Zinoviev letter which was believed to have helped destabilise the first Labour Government in 1924.

On 22 March 1987 former MI5 officer James Miller claimed that the Ulster Workers' Council strike of 1974 had been promoted by MI5 to help destabilise Wilson's government.

In July 1987, Labour MP, Ken Livingstone used his maiden speech to raise the allegations of a former Army press officer, Colin Wallace, that the Army press office in Northern Ireland had been used in the 1970s as part of a smear campaign, codenamed Clockwork Orange, against Harold Wilson and other British and Irish politicians.

== Recent scholarship ==
In The Defence of the Realm (2009), the first authorised history of MI5, by Christopher Andrew, it was shown that MI5 kept a file on Wilson from 1945, when he became an MP – because communist civil servants claimed that he had similar political sympathies. However, Defence of the Realm claims that there was no conspiracy against Wilson, and repeats the Callaghan government claim that there was no bugging of 10 Downing Street. Doubt was cast on this claim, however, in 2010 when newspaper reports made detailed allegations that the bugging of 10 Downing Street had been omitted from the history for "wider public interest reasons". The government did not issue a denial of the allegations. In 1963, on Harold Macmillan's orders following the Profumo affair, MI5 bugged the cabinet room, the waiting room, and the prime minister's study until the bugs were removed in 1977 on James Callaghan's orders. From the records it is unclear if Harold Wilson or Edward Heath knew of the bugging, and no recorded conversations were retained by MI5, so the bugs were possibly never activated.

Intelligence historian Jon Moran, concluded in 2014:

The characterisation of Harold Wilson as paranoid does not take account of the political context of the time, which was characterised by a political style generally which applied to both left and right (including MI5 itself). The suspicion of Wilson and others towards the activities of the security services and other figures resulted from concrete domestic and international developments ... Andrew is correct to be sceptical, and there remains limited evidence of a 'plot', if a plot is defined as a tightly organised high-level conspiracy with a detailed plan. However there is evidence of a conspiracy: a loosely connected series of unlawful manoeuvres against an elected government by a group of like-minded figures.

== See also ==
- Wilson Doctrine, a ban on the tapping of MPs' and peers' telephones
- A Very British Coup, a 1982 novel by Labour politician Chris Mullin
- The Crown, a Netflix series, which dramatises the 1968 Cecil King affair (Season 3, Episode 5)
