= Ed Fraiman =

British filmmaker

Ed Fraiman is a British filmmaker who won the Directors Guild of Great Britain Best Newcomer Award. He learned his craft at the Łódź Film School. He has since directed more than 70 episodes of television in the US and UK for Warner Brothers, Universal Pictures, BBC and Channel 4.

Recently, Ed directed and executive produced 'Anaconda' the spin-off/embedded pilot for the Warner Brothers' show 'The 100' on The CW Network. In total, Ed was the producing director on 29 episodes of the series and directed and/or produced over a third of the episodes spanning 7 seasons of the show.

Prior to his work on 'The 100', Ed was the producing director on the first season of 'Impulse' (TV series) for Universal Pictures and YouTube Red. Other producing director credits include 'Secret State' (TV miniseries) starring Gabriel Byrne, Charles Dance and Gina McKee for Channel 4 Television. Ed directed and executive produced and directed all episodes of the mini-series, which was inspired by Chris Mullin's 1982 novel A Very British Coup. 'Secret State' was nominated for the International Emmy Award for Best TV Movie or Miniseries and subsequently sold to over 40 territories worldwide.

Ed's US television director credits include 5 episodes of Universal Content Productions' 'Royal Pains' for USA network, 4 episodes of CBS Media Ventures Life Is Wild for The CW Network and NBC's 'The Philanthropist''. Ed also directed 3 episodes of the Arthurian drama 'Merlin' (2008 TV series) for Syfy and the BBC.

British television credits include directing the award-winning procedural 'Murphy's Law (British TV series)', 'A Thing Called Love', 'Burn It' for the BBC and the critically acclaimed'As If' (British TV series)' for Channel 4 Television. Ed also directed the BBC's ShakespeaRe-Told adaptation of 'A Midsummer Night's Dream' which was nominated at the Banff World Media Festival for Best Movie Made For Television.

Ed is a partner at Bigscope Films where he has executive produced a slate of feature films including 'Don't Hang Up' (film), 'The Banishing', 'Pressure', 'Alien Outpost' and 'Aasha The Street Dog' (which is in post-production).

Ed is a dual British and American citizen and resides with his family in Santa Monica, California. He is represented by the Verve Talent and Literary Agency.

== Director ==
Impulse (TV series) – (1 episode, 2018)

- Treading Water (2018)

The 100 (TV series) – (9 episodes, 2014–2017; 2019–2020)

- Human Trials (2014)
- Watch The Thrones (2016)
- Nevermore (2016)
- Perverse Instantiation: Part One (2016)
- Heavy Lies The Crown (2017)
- Sanctum (2019)
- The Blood of Sanctum (2019)
- From the Ashes (2020)
- Anaconda (2020)

Secret State (TV series) – (4 episodes, 2012)

- Episode #1.4 (2012)
- Episode #1.3 (2012)
- Episode #1.2 (2012)
- Episode #1.1 (2012)

Royal Pains (TV series) – (3 episodes, 2010–2015)

- Secret Asian Man (2015)
- Pins and Needles (2013)
- Ta Da For (2011)
- Astraphobia (2011)
- Comfort's Overrated (2010)

The Philanthropist (TV series) – (1 episode, 2009)

- Myanmar (2009)

Merlin (TV series) – (3 episodes, 2008)

- A Remedy to Cure All Ills (2008)
- Lancelot (2008)
- The Poisoned Chalice (2008)

Life Is Wild (TV series) – (4 episodes, 2007–2008)

- Love Life (2008)
- The Code (2007)
- The Heart Wants What It Wants (2007)
- Heritage Day (2007)

ShakespeaRe-Told (TV mini-series) – (1 episode, 2005)

- A Midsummer Night's Dream (2005)

A Thing Called Love (TV series) – (2 episodes, 2004)

- Love Hurts (2004)
- Turning Point (2004)

Murphy's Law (TV series) – (2 episodes, 2004)

- Go Ask Alice (2004)
- Ringers (2004)

Burn It (TV series) – (5 episodes, 2003)

- Episode #1.10 (2003)
- Episode #1.9 (2003)
- Episode #1.8 (2003)
- Episode #1.7 (2003)
- Episode #1.6 (2003)

As If (TV series) – (6 episodes, 2002)

- Sasha's POV (2002)
- Alex's POV (2002)
- Rob's POV (2002)
- Sooz's POV (2002)
- Jamie's POV (2002)
- Sacha's POV (2002)

The Bill (TV series) – (4 episodes, 2000–2001)

- Hitting Home (2001)
- Return of the Hunter (2001)
- Appropriate Action (2001)
- Sorted (2000)
- Once Upon a Time (1998 short)
- Lloyds Bank Channel 4 Film Challenge (TV series) – (1 episode, 1997)
- Nurse Ajax (1997)
- Guardian Angel (1996 short)
