= Can't Happen Here =

It Can't Happen Here is a 1935 novel by Sinclair Lewis and the 1936 play version by Lewis and John C. Moffitt.

Can't Happen Here or It Can't Happen Here may also refer to:

- "It Can't Happen Here", a song by Frank Zappa on Freak Out!, his 1966 debut album with the Mothers of Invention
- "Can't Happen Here", a song from Rainbow's 1981 album Difficult to Cure
- "Can't Happen Here", a song from Stabbing Westward's 1994 album, Ungod
- "Can't Happen Here", a song from Atreyu's 2007 album, Lead Sails Paper Anchor

== See also ==
- It Can Happen Here (disambiguation)
- This Can't Happen Here, a 1950 Swedish film
- It Happened Here, a 1966 British film
- "It Couldn't Happen Here", series 2, episode 5 of The Sandbaggers, aired on 25 February 1980
- United States: It Can't Happen Here, a 1982 television film adaptation of Sinclair Lewis' 1935 novel
- It Couldn't Happen Here, a 1988 film starring the Pet Shop Boys
- Can It Happen Here?: Authoritarianism in America, a 2018 non-fiction book by Cass R. Sunstein
