= Stephen Bronner =

American political scientist (born 1949)

Stephen Eric Bronner
- Born: 19 August 1949 (age 77); New York City, New York, United States
- Occupations: Board of Governors Professor of Political Science, Rutgers University

Stephen Eric Bronner (born 19 August 1949) is a political scientist and philosopher, board of governors professor of Political Science at Rutgers University in New Brunswick, New Jersey, United States, and the director of global relations for the Center for the Study of Genocide and Human Rights. Bronner has published over 25 books and 200 journal articles.

== Early life and education ==
Born in New York City, New York, United States on 19 August 1949, Bronner earned a Bachelor of Arts (B.A.) at City College of New York, spent a year at the Universität Tübingen in Germany on a Fulbright-Hays Fellowship in 1973, and completed his Master of Arts (M.A.) and Doctor of Philosophy (Ph.D.) in Political Science from the University of California, Berkeley in 1976.

== Career ==
Bronner has been employed at Rutgers University since 1976, and has held visiting professor positions at the New School for Social Research (1989), and the Universität Leipzig (1998).

Bronner is director of global relations at the Center for the Study of Genocide and Human Rights at Rutgers University, and the executive chair of US Academics for Peace and an advisor to Conscience International. He has been active in civic diplomacy in Iran, Iraq, Palestine, Syria, Sudan, Darfur, Ukraine, and Russia. Some of these experiences are discussed in his books dealing with the internal politics of these nations in Blood in the Sand (2005), Peace out of Reach (2007), and The Bitter Taste of Hope (2017).

Bronner is a contributing editor at Logos: A Journal of Modern Society and Culture. His works include studies of contemporary political theory, political history, and cultural politics.

== Alleged sexual misconduct ==
In 2018, Bronner was accused of sexual assault by several female students and colleagues. After Rutgers University reversed their decision not to investigate, they put Bronner on a paid research sabbatical until their investigation was over. Bronner claims that none of the alleged assaults happened, but stated that he understands some of his comments to women on campus over the years may have caused offense. “I admit I am not always super tactful. Some of my jokes miss the mark. But there was never any harm.” Campus officials "found no proof he violated any school policies" and closed the investigation in March 2020. Bronner had retired in November 2019.

== Theoretical contributions ==
Influenced by critical theory, existentialism, and liberal socialism, Bronner is best known for his reinterpretation of tradition and a host of concepts like the class ideal and the cosmopolitan sensibility.

== Awards and honors ==
Bronner was the recipient of the MEPeace Award by the Network for Middle Eastern Politics in 2011. He received the Michael A. Harrington Prize for Moments of Decision (1991). Bronner received the Charles McCoy Lifetime Achievement Prize from the American Political Science Association in 2005.

== Bibliography ==
=== Scholarly works ===
- Existentialism, Authenticity, Solidarity (New York: Routledge: 2020)
- The Sovereign (New York: Routledge, 2020),
- The Bitter Taste of Hope: Ideas, Ideologies, and Interests in the Age of Obama (Albany: SUNY Press, 2017)
- The Bigot: Why Prejudice Persists (Yale University Press, 2014) ISBN 978-0300162516
- Modernism at the Barricades: Aesthetics, Politics, Utopia (Columbia University Press, 2012) ISBN 978-0231158220
- Critical Theory: A Very Short Introduction (Oxford University Press, 2011) ISBN 978-0199730070
- Peace Out of Reach: Middle Eastern Travels and the Search for Reconciliation (The University Press of Kentucky, 2007) ISBN 978-0813124469
- Blood in the Sand: Imperial Fantasies, Right-Wing Ambitions, and the Erosion of American Democracy (The University Press of Kentucky, 2005) ISBN 0-8131-2367-4
- Reclaiming the Enlightenment: Toward a Politics of Radical Engagement (New York: Columbia University Press, 2004). ISBN 0-231-12608-5. Translation into Spanish: Reivindicación de la Ilustración, Pamplona, Laetoli, 2008. ISBN 978-84-935661-7-3.
- A Rumor about the Jews: Anti-Semitism. Conspiracy, and the Protocols of Zion (Paperback Edition–New York: Oxford University Press, 2004; Hardcover Edition–New York: St. Martin’s Press, 2000; Translation into German–Berlin: Propylaen Verlag, 2000). ISBN 0-19-516956-5; Translation into Spanish: Un rumor sobre los judíos, Pamplona, Laetoli, 2009. ISBN 978-84-92422-06-7.
- Imagining the Possible: Radical Politics for Conservative Times (New York: Routledge, 2002). ISBN 0-415-93260-2
- Of Critical Theory and Its Theorists (2nd Edition–New York: Routledge, 2002; 1st Edition–London: Basil Blackwell, 1994; Translation into Portuguese–Rio de Janeiro: Papirus, 1997). ISBN 0-415-93263-7
- Socialism Unbound (2nd Edition:–Boulder, Colorado: Westview Press, 2000; 1st edition–New York: Routledge, 1990). ISBN 0-8133-6776-X
- Ideas in Action: Political Tradition in the Twentieth Century (Lanham, Maryland: Rowman & Littlefield, 1999; Translation into Korean–Seoul, Korea: Ingansarang Publishers, 2003). ISBN 0-8476-9387-2
- Camus: Portrait of a Moralist (Minneapolis: University of Minnesota Press, 1999; Translation into German–Berlin: Verlag Vorwerk 8, 2002). ISBN 0-8166-3283-9
- Moments of Decision: Political History and the Crises of Radicalism (New York: Routledge, 1992; Translation into German–Frankfurt am Main: Suhrkamp Verlag, 2000). ISBN 0-415-90465-X
- Rosa Luxemburg: A Revolutionary for Our Times (3rd printing– Pennsylvania State University Press, 1997; 2nd printing–New York: Columbia University Press, 1987; 1st printing–London: Pluto Press, 1980). ISBN 0-271-02505-0

=== Popular works ===
- Albert Camus: The Thinker, The Artist, The Man (New York: Franklin Watts, 1996). ISBN 0-531-11305-1
- Leon Blum (New York: Chelsea House Publishing Co., 1986). ISBN 0-87754-511-1
- A Beggar’s Tales (New York: Pella Press, 1978). NO ISBN.
- Afterword for Will Eisner's graphic novel, The Plot (New York: W. W. Norton, 2005). ISBN 0-393-06045-4

=== Edited works ===
- The Logos Reader: Rational Radicalism And the Future of Politics (with Michael J. Thompson) (University Press of Kentucky, 2005). ISBN 0-8131-9148-3
- Planetary Politics: Human Rights, Terror, and Global Society (Lanham, Maryland: Rowman & Littlefield, 2005). ISBN 0-7425-4199-1
- Twentieth Century Political Theory: A Reader (Revised 2nd Edition–New York: Routledge, publication pending 2004; 1st Edition, 1996). ISBN 0-415-94899-1
- Vienna: The World of Yesterday 1889-1914, co-edited with F. Peter Wagner, (Atlantic Highlands, New Jersey: Humanities Press International, 1997). ISBN 0-391-03987-3
- The Letters of Rosa Luxemburg, edited, translated, and with an introduction (2nd edition–Atlantic Highlands, New Jersey: Humanities Press International, 1993; 1st edition–Boulder, Colorado: Westview Press, 1979). ISBN 1-57392-581-0
- Critical Theory and Society, co-edited with Douglas Kellner,(New York: Routledge, 1989). ISBN 0-415-90041-7
- Socialism in History: Political Essays of Henry Patcher (New York: Columbia University Press, 1984). ISBN 0-231-05660-5
- Passion and Rebellion: The Expressionist Heritage co-edited with Douglas Kellner (2nd printing–New York: Columbia University Press, 1988; 1st printing– South Hadley, Massachusetts: Bergin & Garvey; New York: Universe Books; and London: Croom Helm, 1983). ISBN 0-87663-356-4

=== Series editor ===
- "Critical Political Theory and Radical Practice" (New York, NY: Palgrave/Macmillan).
- "Genocide, Atrocity, and Human Rights" (New Brunswick, NJ: Rutgers University Press).
- "Polemics" (Lanham, Maryland: Rowman & Littlefield).
- "Interventions: Social Theory and Contemporary Politics" (Boulder, Colorado: Westview Press).
