= A Very British Coup (TV series) =

1988 British political television series

- Genre: Political drama
- Based on: A Very British Coup by Chris Mullin
- Written by: Alan Plater
- Directed by: Mick Jackson
- Starring: Ray McAnally; Alan MacNaughtan; Keith Allen; Geoffrey Beevers; Marjorie Yates; Jim Carter
- Theme music composer: John E. Keane
- Country of origin: United Kingdom
- Original language: English
- No. of series: 1
- No. of episodes: 3

Production
- Producer: Ann Skinner
- Cinematography: Ernest Vincze
- Editor: Don Fairservice
- Running time: 3 × 1 hour (Including ad breaks)
- Production companies: Skreba Films; Parallax Pictures

Original release
- Network: Channel 4
- Release: 19 June – 3 July 1988

A Very British Coup is a 1988 British political serial adapted from Chris Mullin's 1982 novel of the same name in 1988 by screenwriter Alan Plater and director Mick Jackson. Starring Ray McAnally, the series was first screened on Channel 4 and won BAFTA and Emmy awards, and was screened in more than 30 countries.

The 2012 four-part Channel 4 series Secret State was "inspired" by the same novel. It starred Gabriel Byrne and was written by Robert Jones.

== Plot ==
Harry Perkins, an unassuming, working class, very left-wing Leader of the Labour Party and Member of Parliament for Sheffield Central, becomes Prime Minister in March 1991 after his party wins a landslide majority in that year's general election, defeating the incumbent Conservative government beleaguered by a banking sector crisis. The priorities of the Perkins Government include dissolving all newspaper monopolies, withdrawal from NATO, removing all American military bases on UK soil, unilateral nuclear disarmament, and true open government. Newspaper magnate Sir George Fison, with allies within British political and Civil Service circles, moves immediately to discredit him, with the United States the key, but covert, conspirator. The most effective of the Prime Minister's domestic enemies is the aristocratic Sir Percy Browne, Head of MI5, whose ancestors "unto the Middle Ages" have exercised subtle power behind the scenes. However, Perkins finds support in Joan Cook, his Home Secretary; Fred Thompson, his Press Secretary; Inspector Page, his police bodyguard; and Sir Montague Kowalski, the Chief Scientific Adviser to the Ministry of Defence.

Marcus Morgan, the US Secretary of State, visits London to try to persuade Perkins of his country's need of a nuclear deterrent, suggesting that American financial assistance in repairing the British economy is conditional upon the abandonment of his defence policies. However, as Perkins undiplomatically rejects his pleas, asserting that his government has a mandate to enact said policies, severe financial pressure is applied to Britain in retaliation for his actions. The government turns to the International Monetary Fund (IMF), which agrees to help, but only on condition that expenditure be cut by £10 billion, which would force Perkins to abandon most of his spending commitments. While the IMF offer is being debated in Cabinet, Perkins receives a call from his Foreign Secretary Tom Newsome, who has been having meetings in Sweden, and is able to announce that the International State Bank of Moscow has agreed to lend the money without preconditions. In retaliation, Newsome's affair with Maureen Jackson, a member of the Hampstead Labour Party, is reported by Fison's newspapers, alleging that she posed a security risk owing to spurious IRA connections. Newsome is forced to resign from the Cabinet and his wife commits suicide after being harassed by journalists. During Annette's funeral, Thompson, fearing a smear campaign against the Perkins ministry, asks Perkins if rumours about him being a homosexual are true; Perkins patiently denies the accusation, stating that he had a brief relationship years earlier with a woman who later married someone else, and who had corresponded with him after he became prime minister.

Failed negotiations between the government and trade unions to formulate an economic strategy result in working-to-rule by the United Power Workers' Union purportedly over job losses that the adoption of alternative energy might incur. The resultant blackouts seriously damage public opinion of the Perkins Government. Thompson, with the aid of his aristocratic girlfriend Elizabeth Fain, outlines the members of the conspiracy, including the moderate, politically ambitious Chancellor of the Exchequer Lawrence Wainwright, who lost the last Labour leadership election to Perkins two years before. With this information, Perkins bluffs Wainwright into ending the strike by threatening either to investigate his connections with his co-conspirators via a public inquiry, or leak information about them to the press. With the crisis swiftly resolved, Wainwright is demoted to Northern Ireland Secretary and Cook is promoted to Chancellor of the Exchequer.

The Perkins Government's policies for nuclear disarmament and neutrality, despite the live national broadcast of the disarming of a nuclear warhead, are hampered by the Chiefs of Staff fudging the figures regarding British, NATO and Warsaw Pact military capabilities, representatives of the United States government and armed forces claiming that the removal of US military bases can only be achieved after five years (after the latest possible date for the next general election), and the covert assassination of Sir Montague staged as a road accident.

Browne presents Perkins with forged evidence of financial irregularity suggesting that he had accepted £300,000 from the Soviet government as part of loan negotiations with the International State Bank of Moscow. Implicated in the allegation is Helen Jarvis (née Spencer), a financial advisor who revealed to Perkins illegal dealings in the City which brought about the banking sector crisis which helped Perkins win the last election, who helped negotiate the Moscow State Bank deal, and with whom Perkins was in a relationship years earlier; MI5 manages to ensure her silence on the subject after Browne's assistant Fiennes issues veiled threats to her. With the groundwork having been laid by Fison with manufactured press speculation over Perkins's health and fake opinion polls suggesting overwhelming public support for a Wainwright premiership, Browne blackmails Perkins into resigning on grounds of ill health, suggesting that the forged evidence will be leaked to the press if he does not comply. Although Perkins calmly agrees to Browne's demands, he uses a televised address broadcast live and on all channels meant for the announcement of his resignation to instead expose the attempted blackmail and announce both an early general election (which Perkins frames as a referendum on British democracy) and a public inquiry. Senior Army officers and security service officials watch in silence.

The final sequence, on the morning of the election, is deliberately ambiguous, but implies that a military coup has begun: a polling station is shown with the screen becoming obscured by the shadow of a tank, the quiet of the early morning is disrupted by the noise of a helicopter, and a news broadcast states that "authorities at Buckingham Palace" would "clarify the constitutional situation". The scene quickly cuts to black.

== Cast ==
- Harry Perkins MP, Prime Minister and Leader of the Labour Party – portrayed by Ray McAnally
- Sir Percy Browne, Director General of MI5 – portrayed by Alan MacNaughtan
- Fred Thompson, Downing Street Press Secretary – portrayed by Keith Allen
- Lawrence Wainwright MP, Chancellor of the Exchequer – portrayed by Geoffrey Beevers
- Joan Cook MP, Home Secretary – portrayed by Marjorie Yates
- Tom Newsome MP, Foreign Secretary – portrayed by Jim Carter
- Sir George Fison, owner of a consortium of newspapers – portrayed by Philip Madoc
- Alford, Director-General of the BBC – portrayed by Jeremy Young
- Fiennes, assistant to Sir Percy Browne – portrayed by Tim McInnerny
- Marcus Morgan, US Secretary of State – portrayed by Shane Rimmer
- Thomas Andrews MP, Leader of the Conservative Party and former Prime Minister – portrayed by Roger Brierley
- Inspector Page, Perkins's police bodyguard – portrayed by Bernard Kay
- Sir Montague Kowalski, Chief Scientific Adviser to the Ministry of Defence – portrayed by Oscar Quitak
- Sir Horace Tweed, Principal Private Secretary to the Prime Minister – portrayed by Oliver Ford Davies
- Sir James Robertson, Cabinet Secretary – portrayed by David McKail
- Helen Jarvis, former lover of Perkins – portrayed by Kika Markham

== Production ==
=== Setting ===
The series is set in 1991 and 1992, which was then the near future from when it was made (1988), with a King as the British monarch (the royal cypher on one of the Prime Minister's red boxes is shown as "C III R," suggesting that the monarch is Charles III, who in real-life acceded to the throne in 2022). The 1991 and 1992 dates can be clearly seen on several newspapers and car tax discs shown on screen.

=== Writing ===
The endings of the novel and the television version are significantly different. In the novel, the Prime Minister is forced from office following a catastrophic nuclear accident at an experimental nuclear plant that he had pushed for while Secretary of State for the Public Sector in a previous government. This is the most explicit parallel between Harry Perkins and Tony Benn who was in the post from 1975 to 1979. The ending was changed because "the TV people thought [Mullin] had allowed Perkins to cave in and resign too easily when he's blackmailed."

== Home media and streaming ==
The TV series of A Very British Coup was released in the UK on DVD (region 2) in September 2011. The series is available for streaming within the United Kingdom on Channel 4's website.

== Awards ==
The TV version of A Very British Coup won four Bafta Awards in 1989 – for Best Actor (Ray McAnally), Best Drama Series, Best Film Editor (Don Fairservice) and Best Film Sound – and a 1988 International Emmy Award for Best Drama.

== See also ==
- Clockwork Orange (plot), an alleged 1974–75 British secret service black propaganda campaign against Labour Prime Minister Harold Wilson
- Seven Days in May, a 1964 American political thriller film about a military coup in response to a disarmament treaty with the Soviet Union
- Okkupert, a 2015 Norwegian political thriller TV series about a Russian occupation of Norway in response to a Green government shutting down fossil fuel production
- List of fictional prime ministers of the United Kingdom

== Notes ==
Preceded by Tutti Frutti	British Academy Television Awards; Best Drama Series or Serial; 1989	Succeeded by Mother Love
