= Secret State =

Secret State may refer to:

- Polish Underground State, a political and military entity formed by the union of resistance organizations in World War II occupied Poland
- Secret State (TV series), a 2012 British political thriller
