= Gordon Bagier =

British politician (1924–2012)

Gordon Alexander Thomas Bagier (7 July 1924 – 8 April 2012) was a British Labour Party politician.

== Early life ==
Bagier was educated at Pendower Secondary Technical School (merged with neighbouring St Cuthbert's Grammar School to become its lower school in 1977) on Fox and Hounds Lane (off the A186) in Benwell, Newcastle upon Tyne. He served in the Royal Marines from 1941 to 1945, as a gunner aboard the light cruiser HMS Belfast, and later played a part in her preservation. He was a signals inspector on British Railways. He served as a councillor on Keighley Borough Council 1956–60 and Sowerby Bridge Urban Council from 1962, and as President of the Yorkshire District Council of the National Union of Railwaymen.

== Parliamentary career ==
At the 1964 general election, Bagier stood in the Sunderland South constituency, where he defeated the sitting Conservative Member of Parliament, Paul Williams. He held the seat until his retirement at the 1987 general election, when his successor was the left-wing journalist Chris Mullin.

== Personal life ==
He married Violet Sinclair in 1949. They had two sons and two daughters. He died on 8 April 2012.

Parliament of the United Kingdom
Preceded by Paul Williams	Member of Parliament for Sunderland South; 1964–1987	Succeeded by Chris Mullin
