= 1953 Sunderland South by-election =

UK parliamentary by-election

The 1953 Sunderland South by-election was held on 13 May 1953. It was held due to the death of the Labour MP Richard Ewart. It was gained by the Conservative candidate Paul Williams who had unsuccessfully contested the seat in the 1951 general election. It was the first time since 1924 that an incumbent government had gained a seat from the opposition in a by-election. The gain was held at the 1955 general election.

Sunderland South by-election, 1953
Party	Candidate	Votes	%	±%
Conservative	Paul Williams	23,114	48.6	−1.1
Labour	Alexander G.S. Whipp	21,939	46.1	−4.2
Liberal	Roy Francis Leslie	2,524	5.3	New
Majority		1,175	2.5	N/A
Turnout		47,557		
Conservative gain from Labour		Swing		
