= Nela Navarro =

Nela Navarro is a professor at Rutgers University where she is an executive committee member of the UNESCO Chair in Genocide Prevention and the Associate Director of the Center for the Study of Genocide and Human Rights.

She was a lecturer at Columbia University's School of International and Public Affairs (SIPA), Columbia University's Chazen Business School, and abroad at Shanghai International Studies University.

== Biography ==
Navarro serves as an editor for "Genocide, Human Rights and Political Violence".

At Rutgers University, Navarro advises and coordinates The Rutgers Humanist, a student magazine that examines local, regional, and international human rights issues. Students and staff members have the opportunity to become Editor-in-Chiefs of a critical human rights issue of topic for the magazine. The first spread was published in Spring 2011.

In 2012, Navarro received a "Women on the Front Line Award" from the New York Theological Seminary (NYTS). She was awarded at the NYTS conference, "111 Years of Walking Gender Justice."
