= Alexander Laban Hinton =

American historian

- Born: United States

Academic background
- Education: Wesleyan University

Academic work
- Institutions: Rutgers University
- Main interests: Anthropology; Genocide Studies

Alexander Laban Hinton is an American anthropologist whose work focuses on genocide, mass violence, extremism, transitional justice, and human rights. He has written extensively on the Cambodian genocide and, in 2016, was an expert witness at the Khmer Rouge Tribunal. He has authored many books, including, It Can Happen Here: White Power and the Rising Threat of Genocide in the US and Anthropological Witness: Lessons from the Khmer Rouge Tribunal. As of 2024, he is a distinguished professor at Rutgers University. He serves as an academic advisor to the Documentation Center of Cambodia, as well as on the international advisory boards of journals such as the Genocide Studies and Prevention, Journal of Genocide Research, and Journal of Perpetrator Research.

== Research ==
Alexander Hinton is the author of seventeen books and he is co-editor of the CGHR-Rutgers University Press book series, Genocide, Political Violence, Human Rights. He also co-organized the 2014-2016 Rethinking Peace Studies initiative and is co-convener of the Global Consortium on Bigotry and Hate (2019–2024). Hinton's 2022 book, Anthropological Witness, centers on his 2016 experience testifying as an expert witness at the Khmer Rouge tribunal in Cambodia. Essays by Hinton include the application of this type of anthropological analysis to extremist patterns in contemporary cultures, such as the development of Make America Great Again and the Project 2025 objectives in the USA political culture.

=== Research positions ===
During 2011–2013, Hinton was president of the International Association of Genocide Scholars. He was a member/visitor at the Institute for Advanced Study in Princeton, New Jersey during the same period. As of 2023, Hinton holds the positions of director of the Center for the Study of Genocide and Human Rights, Distinguished Professor of Anthropology, and UNESCO Chair in Genocide Prevention at Rutgers University.

== Awards and prizes ==
Among other awards, Hinton received the 2009 Robert B. Textor and Family Prize for Excellence in Anticipatory Anthropology, the 2022 Anthropology in the Media Award from the American Anthropological Association, and a 2024 Lifetime Achievement Award from the International Network of Genocide Scholars.

== Scholarly works ==
Notable publications by Hinton include:

- Biocultural Approaches to the Emotions (Cambridge University Press, 1999) ISBN 9780521655699
- Genocide: An Anthropological Reader (Blackwell, 2002) ISBN 978-0-631-22355-9
- Annihilating Difference: The Anthropology of Genocide (California, 2002) ISBN 9780520927575
- Why Did They Kill? Cambodia in the Shadow of Genocide (California, 2005) [Awarded 2008 Stirling Prize] ISBN 9780520241794
- Night of the Khmer Rouge (Paul Robeson Gallery, 2007)
- Genocide: Truth, Memory, Representation (Co-edited, Duke, 2009)
- Transitional Justice: Global Mechanisms and Local Realities after Genocide and Mass Violence (Rutgers, 2010) ISBN 978-0-8135-4761-9
- Hidden Genocides: Power, Knowledge, Memory (Co-edited, Rutgers, 2014) ISBN 978-0-8135-6162-2
- Colonial Genocide in Indigenous North America (co-edited, Duke, 2014) ISBN 978-0-8223-5763-6
- Genocide and Mass Violence (co-edited, Cambridge, 2015) ISBN 9781107694699
- Man or Monster? The Trial of a Khmer Rouge Torturer (Duke, 2016) ISBN 978-0-8223-6258-6
- The Justice Facade: Trials of Transition in Cambodia (Oxford, 2018) ISBN 9780198820956
- Rethinking Peace: Discourse, Memory, Translation, and Dialogue (co-edited, Rowman and Littlefield, 2019) ISBN 9781786610386
- It Can Happen Here: White Power and the Rising Threat of Genocide in the US (NYU, 2021) ISBN 9781479808052
- Anthropological Witness: Lessons from the Khmer Rouge Tribunal (Cornell, 2022) ISBN 9781501765698
- Perpetrators: Encountering Humanity's Dark Side (co-authored, Stanford, 2023) ISBN 9781503634275
