= Sunderland South =

Parliamentary constituency in the United Kingdom, 1950–2010

Coordinates: 54.890°N 1.378°W

- Former borough constituency for the House of Commons
- Boundary of Sunderland South in Tyne and Wear for the 2005 general election

- Location of Tyne and Wear within England
- County: Tyne and Wear

1950–2010
- Seats: One
- Created from: Sunderland
- Replaced by: Houghton and Sunderland South, Sunderland Central and Washington and Sunderland West

Sunderland South was, from 1950 until 2010, a constituency represented in the House of Commons of the Parliament of the United Kingdom. It elected one Member of Parliament (MP) by the first past the post system of election.

== History ==
Sunderland South, as can be inferred from the name, formed the southern part of the County Borough (now City) of Sunderland. The constituency was created by the Representation of the People Act 1948 for the 1950 general election when the existing two-member Sunderland seat was split in two. Parts also transferred from Houghton-le-Spring.

It was abolished for the 2010 general election when most of its contents were divided between the two new constituencies of Sunderland Central (eastern areas) and Houghton and Sunderland South (western areas). St Anne's ward was transferred to the new constituency of Washington and Sunderland West.

== Boundaries ==
=== 1950–1955 ===
- The County Borough of Sunderland wards of Bishopwearmouth, Hendon, Humbledon, Pallion, Park, St Michael's, Sunderland East, Thornhill, and West.

=== 1955–1974 ===
- The County Borough of Sunderland wards of Bishopwearmouth, Hendon, Humbledon, Pallion, Park, Pennywell, St Michael's, Thorney Close, and Thornhill.

Minor changes.

=== 1974–1983 ===
- The County Borough of Sunderland wards of Bishopwearmouth, Hendon, Humbledon, Pennywell, Ryhope, St Chad's, St Michael's, Silksworth, Thorney Close, and Thornhill.

Boundaries expanded southwards in line with those of the County Borough, including the gain of Ryhope and Silksworth from Houghton-le-Spring. Existing boundary with Sunderland North realigned, including the loss of Pallion ward.

=== 1983–1997 ===
- The Metropolitan Borough of Sunderland wards of Grindon, Hendon, Ryhope, St Chad's, St Michael's, Silksworth, Thorney Close, and Thornholme. Minor changes to take account of new ward boundaries.

=== 1997–2010 ===
- The City of Sunderland wards of Grindon, Hendon, St Chad's, St Michael's, Silksworth, South Hylton, Thorney Close, and Thornholme. South Hylton ward transferred from Sunderland North. Ryhope ward transferred to the new constituency of Houghton and Washington East.

== Political history ==
Having been a Labour–Conservative marginal in the 1950s and 1960s, Sunderland South was held by the Labour Party from 1964 until 2010. Its last MP was journalist-politician Chris Mullin, who served between the 1987 and 2010 general elections, inclusive. Sunderland South was abolished as a result of the Fifth Periodic Review of Westminster constituencies, which took effect at the 2010 election. Mullin did not seek re-election in 2010.

The constituency was well known for trying to be the first seat to declare its results, doing so in the general elections of 1992, 1997, 2001 and 2005.

== Members of Parliament ==
| Election | Member | Party |
|---|---|---|
| 1950 | Richard Ewart | Labour |
| 1953 | Paul Williams | Conservative |
| 1964 | Gordon Bagier | Labour |
| 1987 | Chris Mullin | Labour |
| 2010 | constituency abolished: see Houghton and Sunderland South & Sunderland Central | |

== Elections ==
=== Elections in the 1950s ===
General election 1950: Sunderland South
| Party | Candidate | Votes | % | ±% |
|---|---|---|---|---|
| Labour | Richard Ewart | 27,192 | 49.6 | |
| Conservative | H. Wilkinson | 22,012 | 40.2 | |
| Liberal | Charles Jonathan Kitchell | 5,604 | 10.2 | |
| Majority | | 5,180 | 9.4 | |
| Turnout | | 54,808 | 83.3 | |
| Labour win (new seat) | | | | |

General election 1951: Sunderland South
| Party | Candidate | Votes | % | ±% |
|---|---|---|---|---|
| Labour | Richard Ewart | 27,257 | 50.3 | +0.7 |
| Conservative | Paul Williams | 26,951 | 49.7 | +9.5 |
| Majority | | 306 | 0.6 | −8.8 |
| Turnout | | 54,208 | 94.1 | +10.8 |
| Labour hold | | Swing | | |

1953 Sunderland South by-election
| Party | Candidate | Votes | % | ±% |
|---|---|---|---|---|
| Conservative | Paul Williams | 23,114 | 48.6 | −1.1 |
| Labour | Alexander G.S. Whipp | 21,939 | 46.1 | −4.2 |
| Liberal | Roy Francis Leslie | 2,524 | 5.3 | New |
| Majority | | 1,175 | 2.5 | |
| Turnout | | 47,557 | | |
| Conservative gain from Labour | | Swing | | |

General election 1955: Sunderland South
| Party | Candidate | Votes | % | ±% |
|---|---|---|---|---|
| Conservative | Paul Williams | 24,727 | 51.9 | +2.2 |
| Labour | Ernest Armstrong | 22,953 | 48.1 | −2.2 |
| Majority | | 1,774 | 3.8 | |
| Turnout | | 47,680 | 77.4 | −16.7 |
| Conservative gain from Labour | | Swing | | |

General election 1959: Sunderland South
| Party | Candidate | Votes | % | ±% |
|---|---|---|---|---|
| Conservative | Paul Williams | 27,825 | 50.9 | −1.0 |
| Labour | Ernest Armstrong | 26,835 | 49.1 | +1.0 |
| Majority | | 990 | 1.8 | −2.0 |
| Turnout | | 54,660 | 80.3 | +2.9 |
| Conservative hold | | Swing | | |

=== Elections in the 1960s ===
General election 1964: Sunderland South
| Party | Candidate | Votes | % | ±% |
|---|---|---|---|---|
| Labour | Gordon Bagier | 25,900 | 51.6 | +2.5 |
| Conservative | Paul Williams | 24,334 | 48.4 | −2.5 |
| Majority | | 1,566 | 3.2 | |
| Turnout | | 50,234 | 75.8 | −4.5 |
| Labour gain from Conservative | | Swing | | |

General election 1966: Sunderland South
| Party | Candidate | Votes | % | ±% |
|---|---|---|---|---|
| Labour | Gordon Bagier | 27,567 | 57.5 | +5.9 |
| Conservative | Philip Edwin Heselton | 20,398 | 42.5 | −5.9 |
| Majority | | 7,169 | 15.0 | +11.8 |
| Turnout | | 47,965 | 75.5 | −0.3 |
| Labour hold | | Swing | | |

=== Elections in the 1970s ===
General election 1970: Sunderland South
| Party | Candidate | Votes | % | ±% |
|---|---|---|---|---|
| Labour | Gordon Bagier | 26,840 | 56.4 | −1.1 |
| Conservative | Denis Orde | 20,722 | 43.6 | +1.1 |
| Majority | | 6,118 | 12.8 | −2.2 |
| Turnout | | 47,562 | 70.1 | −5.4 |
| Labour hold | | Swing | −1.1 | |

General election February 1974: Sunderland South
| Party | Candidate | Votes | % | ±% |
|---|---|---|---|---|
| Labour | Gordon Bagier | 28,296 | 49.6 | −6.8 |
| Conservative | Mark Thorpe Wright | 19,700 | 34.5 | −9.1 |
| Liberal | Wilfred John Nicholson | 9,098 | 15.9 | New |
| Majority | | 8,596 | 15.1 | +2.2 |
| Turnout | | 57,094 | 75.2 | +5.1 |
| Labour hold | | Swing | +8.0 | |

General election October 1974: Sunderland South
| Party | Candidate | Votes | % | ±% |
|---|---|---|---|---|
| Labour | Gordon Bagier | 28,623 | 55.0 | +5.4 |
| Conservative | John Charles Buchanan Riddell | 15,593 | 30.0 | −4.5 |
| Liberal | Wilfred John Nicholson | 7,828 | 15.0 | −0.9 |
| Majority | | 13,030 | 25.0 | +9.9 |
| Turnout | | 52,044 | 68.1 | −7.1 |
| Labour hold | | Swing | | |

General election 1979: Sunderland South
| Party | Candidate | Votes | % | ±% |
|---|---|---|---|---|
| Labour | Gordon Bagier | 29,403 | 53.1 | −1.9 |
| Conservative | James Richard Harris | 21,002 | 37.9 | +7.9 |
| Liberal | Paul Macdonald Barker | 4,984 | 9.0 | −6.0 |
| Majority | | 8,401 | 15.2 | −9.8 |
| Turnout | | 55,389 | 70.0 | +1.9 |
| Labour hold | | Swing | −4.9 | |

=== Elections in the 1980s ===
General election 1983: Sunderland South
| Party | Candidate | Votes | % | ±% |
|---|---|---|---|---|
| Labour | Gordon Bagier | 22,869 | 45.7 | −7.4 |
| Conservative | Andrew Mitchell | 17,321 | 34.6 | −3.3 |
| SDP | John Anderson | 9,865 | 19.7 | +10.7 |
| Majority | | 5,548 | 11.1 | −4.1 |
| Turnout | | 50,055 | 66.6 | −3.4 |
| Labour hold | | Swing | | |

General election 1987: Sunderland South
| Party | Candidate | Votes | % | ±% |
|---|---|---|---|---|
| Labour | Chris Mullin | 28,823 | 54.0 | +8.3 |
| Conservative | George Howe | 16,210 | 30.4 | −4.2 |
| SDP | Keith Hudson | 7,768 | 14.6 | −5.1 |
| Green | Douglas Jacques | 516 | 1.0 | New |
| Majority | | 12,613 | 23.6 | +12.5 |
| Turnout | | 53,317 | 71.1 | +4.5 |
| Labour hold | | Swing | +6.3 | |

=== Elections in the 1990s ===
General election 1992: Sunderland South
| Party | Candidate | Votes | % | ±% |
|---|---|---|---|---|
| Labour | Chris Mullin | 29,399 | 57.9 | +3.9 |
| Conservative | George Howe | 14,898 | 29.4 | −1.0 |
| Liberal Democrats | John Lennox | 5,844 | 11.5 | −3.1 |
| Green | Terence Scouler | 596 | 1.2 | +0.2 |
| Majority | | 14,501 | 28.5 | +4.9 |
| Turnout | | 50,737 | 69.9 | −1.2 |
| Labour hold | | Swing | +2.5 | |

General election 1997: Sunderland South
| Party | Candidate | Votes | % | ±% |
|---|---|---|---|---|
| Labour | Chris Mullin | 27,174 | 68.1 | +10.2 |
| Conservative | Timothy Schofield | 7,536 | 18.9 | −10.5 |
| Liberal Democrats | John Lennox | 4,606 | 11.5 | 0.0 |
| UKIP | Margaret Wilkinson | 609 | 1.5 | New |
| Majority | | 19,638 | 49.2 | +20.7 |
| Turnout | | 39,925 | 58.8 | −11.1 |
| Labour hold | | Swing | +10.4 | |

=== Elections in the 2000s ===
General election 2001: Sunderland South
| Party | Candidate | Votes | % | ±% |
|---|---|---|---|---|
| Labour | Chris Mullin | 19,921 | 63.9 | −4.2 |
| Conservative | James Boyd | 6,254 | 20.1 | +1.2 |
| Liberal Democrats | Mark Greenfield | 3,675 | 11.8 | +0.3 |
| BNP | Joseph Dobbie | 576 | 1.8 | New |
| UKIP | Joseph Moore | 470 | 1.5 | New |
| Monster Raving Loony | Rosalyn Warner | 291 | 0.9 | New |
| Majority | | 13,667 | 43.8 | −5.4 |
| Turnout | | 31,187 | 48.3 | −10.5 |
| Labour hold | | Swing | −2.7 | |

General election 2005: Sunderland South
| Party | Candidate | Votes | % | ±% |
|---|---|---|---|---|
| Labour | Chris Mullin | 17,982 | 58.6 | −5.3 |
| Conservative | Robert Oliver | 6,923 | 22.5 | +2.4 |
| Liberal Democrats | Gareth Kane | 4,492 | 14.6 | +2.8 |
| BNP | David Guynan | 1,166 | 3.8 | +2.0 |
| Monster Raving Loony | Rosalyn Warner | 149 | 0.5 | −0.4 |
| Majority | | 11,059 | 36.0 | −7.8 |
| Turnout | | 30,712 | 49.3 | +1.0 |
| Labour hold | | Swing | −3.9 | |

== See also ==
- History of parliamentary constituencies and boundaries in Tyne and Wear
- History of parliamentary constituencies and boundaries in Durham
