= Paul Williams (Conservative politician) =

British politician

Paul Glyn Williams (14 November 1922 – 10 September 2008) was a British Conservative Party politician who served as the Member of Parliament (MP) for Sunderland South from 1953 to 1964. He was also a prominent businessman. He was one of 8 Conservative "Suez rebels" who resigned the Conservative Party whip to protest against the government's decision to withdraw from Suez.

== Personal life ==
Williams was the son of businessman Samuel O. Williams and his wife Esmée (née Cail). He was educated at Marlborough College and Trinity Hall, Cambridge (BA 1942), where he won a half blue in athletics and was secretary of the Cambridge University Conservative Association. After graduating in 1942, he served as a flight lieutenant in the RAF during the Second World War, flying transport aircraft.

His first marriage, in 1947, was to former model, Barbara Joan Hardy. They had two daughters, but were divorced in 1964. He later married Gillian Foote, and they had one daughter. He lived near Devizes in Wiltshire. He was survived by his second wife, and his three daughters.

== Business activities ==
Williams became a businessman after his war service. He was a director of: First South African Cordage, 1947–1954; Transair, 1953–1962; Hodgkinson Partners Ltd., PR consultants, 1956–1964; Minster Executive, 1977–1983; and Chairman of the Backer Electric Company Limited, 1978–1987, and of Henry Sykes, 1980–1983. He was a consultant to P-E International plc, 1983–1991, and to Hogg Robinson Career Services, 1991–1995.

He was chairman and managing director of Mount Charlotte Investments from 1966 to 1977, a hotel company that later merged with Thistle Hotels.

== Politics ==
Williams also became politically active as a Conservative after the war. He contested Arthur Blenkinsop's safe Labour seats of Newcastle upon Tyne East in February 1950, and then the marginal constituency of Sunderland South in October 1951, losing narrowly to Labour candidate Richard Ewart by 306 votes. After Ewart's early death, Williams won the seat by 1,175 votes at a by-election in 1953, the first time that the government party had won an opposition seat in a by-election since 1924.

He became a "Suez rebel" in December 1953, urging the government to suspend negotiations with Egypt to evacuate the canal zone, and voted against the Conservative government's Suez policy in July 1954. He increased his majority in the May 1955 general election, but, after further disagreement with government policy to withdraw from Suez, he and seven other backbench Conservative MPs resigned their party's whip in May 1957. He sat as an Independent Conservative until he and four other rebels were persuaded to resume the whip in July 1958. He was re-elected with a reduced majority in 1959. He lost his seat in the October 1964 general election, with Labour candidate Gordon Bagier winning by 1,566 votes.

He held right-wing views, being pro-British Empire, anti-Europe and anti-American, and supported white governments in Africa. He supported white rule in Southern Rhodesia and South Africa. His views were almost polar opposites of those held by the new Conservative leader in 1964, Edward Heath, who remarked of Williams in 1966: "I thoroughly disagree with his views. I always have and I suspect I always will. They are not the view of the modern Tory party, nor the views of the great majority of people in this country." After that rebuke, there was little chance that Williams's parliamentary career would revive.

An early member (1962) of the Conservative Monday Club, Williams was National Club Chairman from 1964 to 1969, standing down in the latter year because of business pressures. In November 1965, Peterborough in the Daily Telegraph stated that "the Club owed a good deal of its standing to its Chairman, Paul Williams", and commended his "political acumen". In 1966 he issued a press statement on behalf of the club criticising the conservative opposition: "Mr Angus Maude is right in saying that 'to the electorate at large the opposition has become a meaningless irrelevance.' To some of us outside Parliament it appears to be neither Conservative nor an opposition ... we must oppose socialism, not condone it." In his outgoing Chairman's address at the club's AGM in April 1969 Williams called for a more aggressive opposition, appealing for "patriotism and moral rejuvenation, and a return for self-respect in the individual and the nation". (Copping, (ii) pp. 13, 16). He remained on the club's executive council until 1973 and was still listed as a vice-president in 1991.

Parliament of the United Kingdom
| Preceded by Richard Ewart | Member of Parliament for Sunderland South; 1953–1964 | Succeeded by Gordon Bagier |
Party political offices
| Preceded by Paul Bristol | Chairman of the Monday Club; May 1964 – April 1969 | Succeeded by George Pole |
