= Richard Ewart =

British politician (1904–1953)

Richard Ewart (15 September 1904 – 8 March 1953) was a Labour Party politician in England. He was elected at the 1945 general election as Member of Parliament (MP) for Sunderland. When that 2-seat constituency was divided for the 1950 general election, he was returned for the new Sunderland South constituency, which re-elected him in 1951. He died in office in 1953, aged 48.

Parliament of the United Kingdom
Preceded by Samuel Storey and Stephen Furness	Member of Parliament for Sunderland; 1945–1950; With: Fred Willey	Constituency divided
New constituency	Member of Parliament for Sunderland South; 1950–1953	Succeeded by Paul Williams
