= George Pole =

British politician (died 2014)

George Edward Pole (died 7 September 2014) was a British Conservative Party member and activist, and an early member (pre-1966) of the Conservative Monday Club, of which he served as National Chairman, 1970–2.

At the Conservative Party Conference in Blackpool in 1970, he submitted on behalf of the London South Kensington Conservative Party Constituency Association, the following motion: "That this conference calls for immediate withdrawal of sanctions against Rhodesia and supports Her Majesty's Government in negotiating with the Rhodesian regime to normalise relations".

In January 1971, Pole, as Chairman, led a delegation of fifteen members of the Monday Club to South Africa, and Rhodesia where they were cordially received and treated to a reception at the home of Ian Douglas Smith the Prime Minister. In January 1973, Pole led a further delegation of twelve Monday Club members on a fact-finding tour of Ulster, visiting the main towns and border areas, and interviewing officials.

Party political offices
| Preceded by Paul Williams | Chairman of the Monday Club; April 1969 - June 1972 | Succeeded by The Hon. Jonathan Guinness |
