= Perpetrator studies =

Field of research regarding the perpetrators of mass killings and political violence

Perpetrator studies, also known as perpetrator research, is a nascent interdisciplinary, scholarly field of research into the perpetrators of mass killings and/or political violence. It is covered in the Journal of Perpetrator Research and other publications.

Anthropologists, historians, and psychologists are among those who have made contributions to the field. The field is relatively novel, with the notable Journal of Perpetrator Research publishing its first issue in 2017, with the aim of studying perpetrators' motives and philosophies. Researchers have also explored the "processes through which genocide took shape" that have contributed to what scholars view as a phenomenon of mostly "ordinary people" becoming highly motivated to commit collective atrocities.

== Development ==
Some of the earliest research done in the field of perpetrator studies, particularly in the aftermath of World War II, involved determining why perpetrators become perpetrators in the first place. Researchers such as R. Hilberg and H. Arendt, who studied Holocaust perpetrators including Adolf Eichmann, determined that these perpetrators are, for the most part, "ordinary people". However, the circumstances they are in are often what prompt them to take such drastic action.

Despite an inherent intrigue about the perpetrators of international violence, the post-World War II Nuremberg Trials sparked significant interest in perpetrator studies as an academic field. The Nuremberg Trials, which took place in Nuremberg, Germany, set an international precedent for trying individuals charged of committing genocide and other serious international crimes. Following the trials and conviction of several defendants, such as Martin Bormann and Karl Dönitz, researchers Douglas Kelley, Gustave Gilbert, and Leon Goldensohn had open and extensive conversations with prisoners held at Nuremberg, subsequently publishing works on those prisoners' experiences and perceived mental health states. The conclusions of this research, supported by personality tests such as the Rorschach test, concluded that the perpetrators indeed fit societal definitions of "normal".

== See also ==
- Hate studies
- International criminal law
- Perpetrator trauma
- Bibliography of genocide studies
