= It Can Happen Here (Conason book) =

2007 book by Joe Conason

It Can Happen Here: Authoritarian Peril in the Age of Bush
- Author: Joe Conason
- Language: English
- Subject: Authoritarianism, George W. Bush
- Publisher: Thomas Dunne Books, an imprint of St. Martin's Press
- Publication date: February, 2007 (1st edition, hardcover)
- Publication place: United States
- Media type: Hardcover
- Pages: 238 pages (1st edition, hardcover)
- ISBN: 0-312-35605-6 (1st edition, hardcover)
- Dewey Decimal: 973.93 22
- LC Class: E902 .C658 2007

It Can Happen Here: Authoritarian Peril in the Age of Bush (2007) is a nonfiction book written by liberal writer and commentator Joe Conason.

Conason discusses what he sees as a trend towards authoritarianism during the administration of US President George W. Bush, focusing on manipulation of intelligence and public opinion surrounding the Iraq War, disregard of national and international law (the NSA warrantless wiretapping controversy and signing statements are used as examples), the increased mix of big business and government, and more. The title comes from Sinclair Lewis' novel It Can't Happen Here (1935), which portrays an American dictatorship and is quoted frequently throughout the book.
