= Center for the Study of Genocide and Human Rights =

United States-based research center

- Abbreviation: CGHR
- Formation: 2008; 18 years ago
- Type: Research Center
- Legal status: U.S. 501(c)(3) organization
- Headquarters: Rutgers University
- Location(s): Newark and New Brunswick, NJ, United States
- Director: Alex Hinton

The Center for the Study of Genocide and Human Rights (CGHR) is a non-profit organization established in 2008 and based at Rutgers, The State University of New Jersey. CGHR examines genocide and mass violence -- as well as their aftermaths and prevention -- through an annual center-wide thematic as well as longer-term projects on global challenges like prevention, bigotry and hate, education and resilience, and Mideast and U.S.-Russian dialogue. In addition, CGHR hosts the UNESCO Chair in Genocide Prevention. CGHR is led by founder and Director Alexander Hinton and Associate Director Nela Navarro and involves the work of a team of visiting scholars, project leaders, affiliated faculty and students, and partners across the United States and the globe.

== Mission ==
According to CGHR's website, the Center's mission "is to understand and prevent genocide and mass atrocity crimes. In doing so, CGHR takes a critical prevention approach. On the one hand, we grapple with critical human rights issues, including the most pressing 21st century challenges that may give rise to genocide, atrocity crimes, and related interventions. On the other hand, we use a critical lens to rethink assumptions and offer alternative ideas and solutions."

== Programs ==
CGHR has a number of research initiatives related to genocide and human rights, including its UNESCO Chair in Genocide Prevention and projects on U.S.-MidEast Dialogue, Forgotten Genocides, Human Rights Education, Raphael Lemkin, and Truth in the Americas. Most recently, the Center convened the 2019-24 Global Consortium on Bigotry and Hate with eight international partners.

== Media Coverage ==
Articles about CGHR have appeared in the local, national, and international media.

== CGHR-Related Publications ==
CGHR Rutgers University Press book, “Genocide, Political Violence, Human Rights”

CGHR e-zine, “The Rutgers Humanist”

CGHR e-journal, "Global Voices"

CGHR conference and event-related publications
