= It Can Happen Here (Hinton book) =

2021 non-fiction book by Alexander Hinton

It Can Happen Here: White Power and the Rising Threat of Genocide in the U.S.
- First edition
- Author: Alexander Laban Hinton
- Language: English
- Genre: Non-fiction
- Publisher: New York University Press
- Publication date: 2021
- Publication place: United States

It Can Happen Here: White Power and the Rising Threat of Genocide in the U.S. is a 2021 book by anthropologist Alexander Laban Hinton and published by New York University Press. Hinton argued that "there is a real risk of violent atrocities happening in the United States".

== See also ==
- It Can't Happen Here
