= Secret State (TV series) =

2012 British political thriller TV series

- British and Irish DVD cover
- Genre: Political drama
- Based on: A Very British Coup by Chris Mullin
- Written by: Robert Jones
- Directed by: Ed Fraiman
- Starring: Gabriel Byrne; Charles Dance; Douglas Hodge; Gina McKee; Rupert Graves; Ruth Negga
- Theme music composer: Alex Heffes
- Country of origin: United Kingdom
- Original language: English
- No. of series: 1
- No. of episodes: 4

Production
- Producer: Johann Knobel
- Cinematography: Owen McPolin
- Editor: Mark Thornton
- Running time: 4 x 1 hour (Including ad breaks)
- Production companies: Company Pictures; Newscope Films

Original release
- Network: Channel 4
- Release: 7 November – 28 November 2012

Secret State is a 2012 British four-part political thriller, starring Gabriel Byrne, Charles Dance and Gina McKee, and inspired by Chris Mullin's 1982 novel A Very British Coup. It delves into the relationship between a democratically elected government, the military and big business. The first episode premiered on Channel 4 on 7 November 2012, with the other three parts being shown over the following three weeks.

== Plot ==
In the run up to a general election, a devastating industrial accident on Teesside leaves 19 people dead and raises questions about the safety procedures of a US petrochemical company, PetroFex. The British prime minister claims to have secured a compensation package from them, but on his return from PetroFex HQ, his plane crashes in the Atlantic under mysterious circumstances. Deputy Prime Minister Tom Dawkins (Gabriel Byrne) takes command, and during his quest to find the truth and justice for the victims, he uncovers a conspiracy at the heart of the political system.

== Main cast ==
- Gabriel Byrne as Tom Dawkins MP, the Deputy Prime Minister who becomes Prime Minister of the United Kingdom after the death of his predecessor, Charles Flyte.
- Charles Dance as John Hodder MP, the Chief Whip.
- Stephen Dillane as Paul Jacob Clark, the CEO of PetroFex.
- Rupert Graves as Felix Durrell MP, the Home Secretary and later Chancellor of the Exchequer.
- Ralph Ineson as Sergeant Wrigglesworth, Dawkins' Diplomatic Protection Group bodyguard.
- Russell Kilmister as Nillis Jacobson, a senior executive at PetroFex.
- Sylvestra Le Touzel as Ros Yelland MP, the Foreign Secretary
- Anna Madeley as Gina Hayes, Dawkins' press officer.
- Gina McKee as Ellis Kane, a freelance journalist.
- Ruth Negga as Agnes Evans, a GCHQ analyst.
- Lia Williams as Laura Duchenne, the Director General of MI5.
- Jamie Sives as Lee Foulds, Dawkins' personal secretary.
- Al Weaver as Joss Leyton a senior GCHQ analyst.
- Douglas Hodge as Anthony Fossett, an investigative reporter and former MI6 officer.
- Nicholas Farrell as General Munnery, the Chief of Defence Staff.
- Anton Lesser as Sir Michael Rix, the head of the Royal Caledonian Bank.
- Tobias Menzies as Charles Flyte, the former prime minister who is killed at the start of the series.

Chris Mullin, the author of A Very British Coup, which served as inspiration for Secret State, appears as a vicar in a cameo role.

== See also ==
- A Very British Coup (TV series), an adaption of A Very British Coup made in 1988
- List of fictional prime ministers of the United Kingdom
