= A Very British Coup =

Novel by Chris Mullin

- Cover of the first edition
- Author: Chris Mullin
- Language: English
- Genre: Novel
- Published: 1982
- Publisher: Hodder & Stoughton
- Publication place: United Kingdom
- Media type: Print
- OCLC: 455822994

A Very British Coup is a 1982 novel by British Labour politician Chris Mullin. The novel has twice been adapted for television; as A Very British Coup in 1988 and as Secret State in 2012.

== Plot ==
Harry Perkins is the left-wing Leader of the Labour Party and Member of Parliament for Sheffield Central. Beating all the odds, Harry becomes Prime Minister following a landslide victory in the 1989 general election, and sets out to dismantle media monopolies, establish Britain as a neutral country through withdrawal from NATO, the removal of American military bases from British soil and unilateral nuclear disarmament, achieve public control of finances, revive manufacturing by withdrawing from the Common Market and imposing import controls, and create an open government. Many people in the media, financial services, and the intelligence services are deeply unhappy with Perkins' win and his policies, and they unite with the United States government to stop him by any means. Shortly after entering office, Perkins hires Independent Socialist journalist Fred Thompson as an aide to answer his letters and to keep an eye on the Civil Service at the Cabinet Office.

After Perkins undiplomatically rejects the pleas of the US Secretary of State to reconsider his defence policies, a run on pound sterling and a resultant balance of payments crisis are engineered to discredit him, with the US and other NATO members refusing to offer standby credit. The International Monetary Fund offers to grant Britain a loan only on the condition of cutting public spending by £10 billion (approximately £24 billion in 2022) over two years. Foreign Secretary Tom Newsome, feigning illness, embarks on a secret tour of Algeria, Libya and Iraq, securing £10 billion in standby credit in support of Labour's policies of the removal of American military bases and the creation of a Palestinian homeland. In retaliation, DI5 reports Newsome's affair with Maureen Jackson, a young member of the Hampstead Labour Party, to Perkins. Although Perkins is reluctant to accept Newsome's resignation, he is left with no choice after the story is reported in the newspapers, implying a security threat due to Maureen's flatmate being a member of the Workers' Revolutionary Party. Following his resignation, Newsome returns home to find his wife having committed suicide by overdosing.

Reg Smith, the Secretary of the United Power Workers' Union, calls for a work-to-rule by power workers in protest against the Perkins ministry's proposed ten per cent pay increase for workers, obstensibly hoping to secure a fifty per cent increase and extra holiday time. Smith is an asset of American intelligence, having secured his loyalty through paid lecture tours, and is opposed to Perkins' policies of abolishing the House of Lords and the honours system due to his personal desire for a peerage. With newspaper magnate Sir George Fison and BBC editor Jonathan Alford, amongst others, ensuring media support for Smith's case (which they depict as comparable to Lech Wałęsa's and Solidarity's), the resultant blackouts and Perkins' refusal to deploy soldiers as strike-breakers seriously damages the government's approval rating. Smith calls off the work-to-rule once enthusiasm amongst his members wanes.

At a Chequers conference held to discuss Perkins' defence policies, the General Staff attempt to misinform the Perkins Cabinet about the extent to which nuclear disarmament and the removal of American bases could be achieved, and the military capabilities of NATO and the Warsaw Pact. The only civil servant supportive of Perkins' policies is Sir Montague Kowalski, Chief Scientific Adviser to the Ministry of Defence. At this conference, Home Secretary Joan Cook overhears Chancellor of the Exchequer Lawrence Wainwright conspiring with Sir Peregrine Craddock, the Director General of DI5. Conspiratorial opposition to Perkins' defence policies also includes Smith's creation of Trade Unions for Multilateral Nuclear Disarmament (TUM), aggressive media campaigns accusing Perkins of leaving Britain defenceless against Soviet invasion, and the organisation of civil disruption by police at a Campaign for Nuclear Disarmament demonstration at which Perkins himself was speaking.

Perkins' premiership is brought to an end by an accident at the experimental Windermere nuclear power station, which threatened to contaminate an area including Blackpool and Liverpool with radiation. Although Perkins approved the station as Secretary of State for the Public Sector to save British manufacturing jobs, DI5 utilise Perkins' affair with Molly Spence, then the mistress and now the wife of Michael Jarvis, the managing director of British Insulated, the firm which built Windermere's reactors, to imply that his support had been bought. Believing that Molly was threatening to leak the story, Perkins agrees to DI5's recommendation that he resign on grounds of ill health.

Following Perkins' resignation, a disputed leadership selection process results in Wainwright being elected leader by a majority of Labour MPs and Leader of the Commons Jock Steeples being selected as leader by Labour's National Executive Committee. With the King appointing the former as Prime Minister on the advice of DI5, Wainwright replaces the entire Cabinet and abandons most of Perkins' policies, much to the jubilation of the conspirators who cheer their achievement of 'a very British coup'.

The epilogue reveals that Perkins, Cook, and Steeples would never hold government office again, that Sir Peregrine quietly retired, that Fison and Smith both received peerages, and that Thompson married his aristocratic girlfriend Elizabeth Fain, moved to Scotland, and started writing a (likely to be unpublished) book about what really happened to Perkins' premiership.

== Main characters ==
- Harry Perkins MP, Prime Minister and Leader of the Labour Party
- Sir Peregrine Craddock, Head of MI5, head conspirator (changed to Sir Percy Browne in the television series)
- Frederick Thompson, former reporter and Perkins' Press Secretary
- Lawrence Wainwright MP, Chancellor of the Exchequer, conspirator
- Joan Cook MP, Home Secretary, later Chancellor of the Exchequer
- Tom Newsome MP, Foreign Secretary, resigns over affair
- Jock Steeples, Lord President of the Council and Leader of the House of Commons, briefly acting Labour leader
- Sir George Fison, owner of a consortium of newspapers, conspirator
- Alford, Director-General of the BBC, conspirator
- Fiennes, assistant to Craddock
- Marcus Morgan, United States Secretary of State
- Inspector Page, Head of Security for the Prime Minister
- Sir Montague Kowalski, Government Chief Scientific Adviser
- Sir Horace Tweed, Prime Minister's aide
- Sir James Robertson, Cabinet Secretary
- Molly Jarvis (née Spence), former lover of Perkins (changed to Helen Jarvis, née Spencer in the television series)

== Analysis ==
The book was written in 1981, at a time when Tony Benn looked likely to become deputy leader of the Labour Party which at the time was strongly challenging the government of Margaret Thatcher in the opinion polls. It also has strong echoes of the persistent rumours that have circulated over the years about attempts by members of the British security services, and other wings of the British Establishment, to undermine and depose Harold Wilson's Labour government of the mid-1970s. This first became widespread public knowledge around 1986 with the controversy over Spycatcher, after the publication of the novel but before the broadcast of the TV version. The story also has echoes of the 1975 Australian constitutional crisis in which there was alleged CIA involvement to remove a government proposing to close US military bases on Australian soil.

Some editions of the book include a quote by Peregrine Worsthorne from his article "When Treason Can Be Right", which argues that treason to defend the UK's alliance with the USA would be justified. This indicates the choice of name for Sir Peregrine, the chief conspirator in the novel.

== Editions ==
The novel was published by Serpent's Tail, and was re-released in 2010. Subsequent reprints have been credited by Mullin to the appointment of Jeremy Corbyn as Labour leader in 2015.

== Sequel ==
In 2015 Mullin revealed that he was working on a sequel, which was published in March 2019 under the title The Friends of Harry Perkins.

== Adaptations ==
The novel has twice been adapted for television.

=== A Very British Coup (1988) ===
The first version, also titled A Very British Coup, was adapted in 1988 by screenwriter Alan Plater and starred Ray McAnally.

=== Secret State (2012) ===
The 2012 four-part Channel 4 series, Secret State, was "inspired" by the same novel. Starring Gabriel Byrne, this version was written by Robert Jones.

== See also ==
- Politics in fiction
- Harold Wilson conspiracy theories
- List of fictional prime ministers of the United Kingdom
