= Clockwork Orange (plot) =

Alleged coup plot in the United Kingdom

Clockwork Orange was a secret British security services project alleged to have involved a right-wing smear campaign against British politicians from 1974 to 1975. The black propaganda led Prime Minister Harold Wilson to fear that the security services were preparing a coup d'état. The operation takes its name from A Clockwork Orange, a 1971 Stanley Kubrick film based on Anthony Burgess' 1962 novel of the same name.

== Project ==
The project was undertaken by members of the British intelligence services and the British Army press office in Northern Ireland, whose job also included routine public relations work and placing disinformation stories in the press as part of a psychological warfare operation against the Provisional Irish Republican Army.

One of the project's members, Colin Wallace, who was the press officer at the Army Headquarters in Northern Ireland, also claims that in 1973, after MI5 became the primary intelligence service in Northern Ireland, the project began giving briefings to foreign journalists against members of Wilson's government. These briefings included distributing forged documents in an attempt to show that the subjects of the briefings were communists or Irish republican sympathisers leading a campaign to destabilise Northern Ireland or were taking bribes.

After his resignation, Wilson claimed that he was the target of a planned military coup. He also denounced a campaign to smear him staged by members of MI5 in order to force his resignation. According to journalist Barry Penrose, Wilson "spoke darkly of two military coups which he said had been planned to overthrow his government in the late 1960s and in the mid 1970s."

In January 1974, while Wilson was still Leader of the Opposition, the British Army carried out Operation Marmion, the occupation of London's Heathrow Airport on the grounds of training for possible violent non-state actor activity at the terminal. The operation was repeated in June, July, and September of that year; Wilson was now Prime Minister following the result of the February general election, but these later rehearsals were executed without his foreknowledge. The military deployments were perceived by many in the left as a practice run for a military takeover rather than an anti-terrorist exercise.

Airey Neave, a Conservative Member of Parliament, was alleged to have been involved with Clockwork Orange, and to have briefed Wallace on a number of occasions.

In the House of Commons, on 30 January 1990, junior defence minister Archie Hamilton admitted the existence of a proposed project called Clockwork Orange, although he went on to say that the project was never approved for operation and that there was no evidence that the proposed project involved a smear campaign against politicians.

The former Cabinet Secretary Lord Hunt conducted a secret inquiry into the allegations and, in August 1996, he said to journalist David Leigh:

There is absolutely no doubt at all that a few, a very few, malcontents in MI5 ... a lot of them like Peter Wright who were rightwing, malicious and had serious personal grudges – gave vent to these and spread damaging malicious stories about that Labour government.

== Books and films ==
- Paul Foot, Who framed Colin Wallace? (1989)
- Peter Wright, Spycatcher (1987)
- Hidden Agenda (1990) – A Ken Loach film in which a similar plot by a "a secret right-wing group" against Harold Wilson is described.
