= Chris Mullin (politician) =

British Labour politician (born 1947)

Sir Chris Mullin
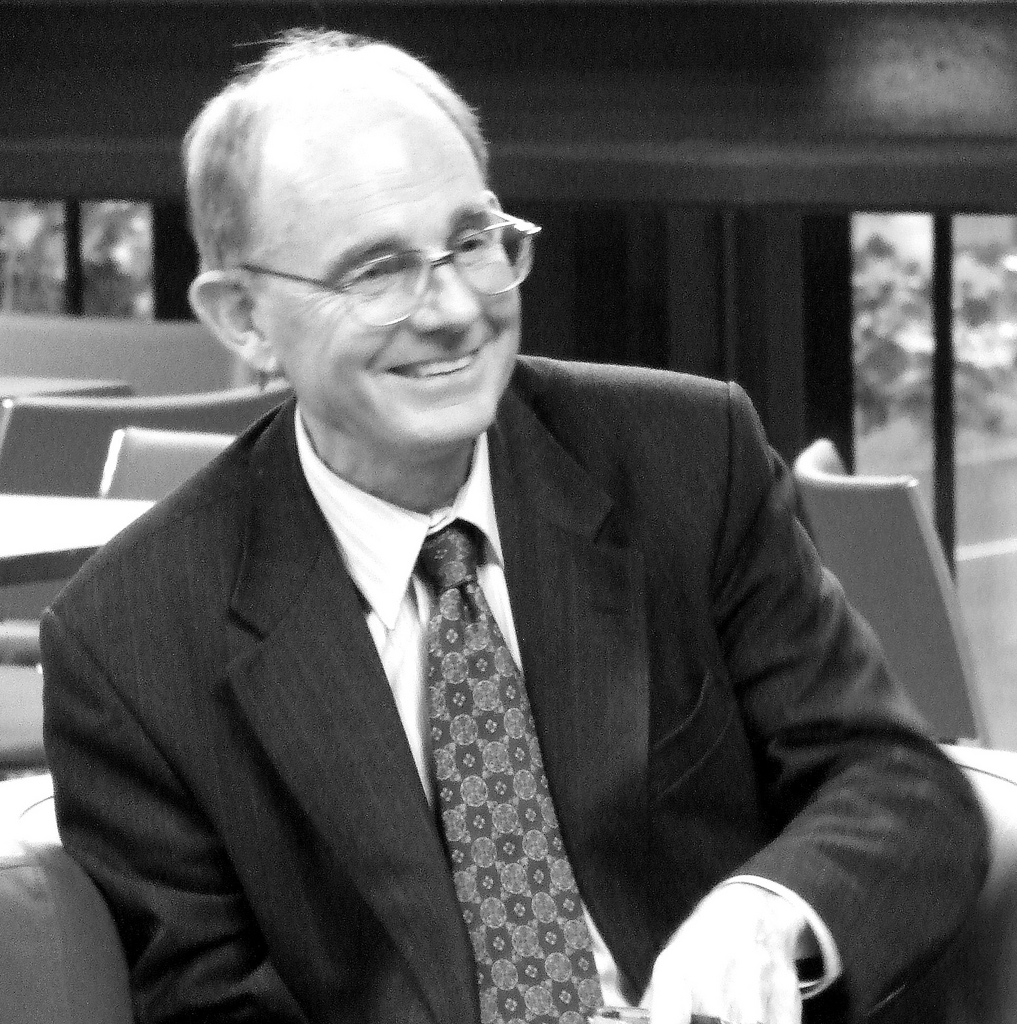
- Mullin in 2009

Parliamentary Under-Secretary of State for Foreign and Commonwealth Affairs
- In office 13 June 2003 – 10 May 2005
- Prime Minister: Tony Blair
- Preceded by: Mike O'Brien
- Succeeded by: The Lord Triesman

Parliamentary Under-Secretary of State for International Development
- In office 26 January 2001 – 11 June 2001
- Prime Minister: Tony Blair
- Preceded by: George Foulkes
- Succeeded by: Hilary Benn

Parliamentary Under-Secretary of State for the Environment, Transport and the Regions
- In office 29 July 1999 – 25 January 2001
- Prime Minister: Tony Blair
- Preceded by: Alan Meale
- Succeeded by: Bob Ainsworth

Chairman of the Home Affairs Select Committee
- In office 18 July 2001 – 15 July 2003
- Prime Minister: Tony Blair
- Preceded by: Robin Corbett
- Succeeded by: John Denham
- In office 17 July 1997 – 18 October 1999
- Preceded by: Ivan Lawrence
- Succeeded by: Robin Corbett

Member of Parliament for Sunderland South
- In office 11 June 1987 – 12 April 2010
- Preceded by: Gordon Bagier
- Succeeded by: Constituency abolished

Personal details
- Born: 12 December 1947 (age 78) Chelmsford, Essex, England
- Party: Labour
- Spouse: Ngoc Mullin
- Children: 2
- Education: University of Hull
- Occupation: Politician and author
- Profession: Journalist
- Website: chrismullinexmp.com

Sir Christopher John Mullin (born 12 December 1947) is a British journalist, author and Labour politician.

As a journalist in the 1980s, Chris Mullin led a campaign that resulted in the release of the Birmingham Six, victims of a miscarriage of justice. In March 2022, a court case settled that Mullin would not need to release any notes relating to who may have planted the two bombs. Mullin is the author of four novels, including A Very British Coup (1982), which was later adapted for television, and its sequel The Friends of Harry Perkins. Mullin is also a celebrated diarist.

Mullin was the Member of Parliament (MP) for Sunderland South from 1987 until 2010. In Parliament, he served as Chairman of the Home Affairs Select Committee and as a Minister in the Department for Environment, Transport and the Regions, the Foreign and Commonwealth Office and in the Department for International Development.

== Early life ==
Mullin is the son of a Scottish Protestant father and an Irish Catholic mother, both of whom worked for Marconi. Mullin was educated at St Joseph's College, a Roman Catholic boarding independent school for boys (now co-educational) in the town of Ipswich in Suffolk, followed by the University of Hull, where he studied Law. He joined the Labour Party after his politics shifted leftward in response to the Vietnam War.

== Journalist and activist ==
Before being elected as an MP, Mullin was a journalist, training with the Daily Mirror. In this period Mullin travelled to Russia and China. From there, his first main activity as a journalist came in the Vietnam War. He has been highly critical of the American strategy in Vietnam and has stated that he believes that the war, intended to stop the advance of Communism, instead only delayed the coming of market forces in the country. Mullin also reported from Cambodia in 1973 and 1980.

=== Birmingham Six ===
Mullin, working for the Granada current affairs programme World in Action, was pivotal in securing the release of the Birmingham Six, a long-standing miscarriage of justice. In 1985, the first of several World in Action programmes casting doubt on the men's convictions was broadcast. In 1986, Mullin's book, Error of Judgment: The Truth About the Birmingham Pub Bombings, set out a detailed case supporting the men's claims that they were innocent. It included his claim to have traced and interviewed those who were actually responsible for the bombings. It was described the writer Sebastian Faulks as, 'one of the greatest feats ever achieved by an investigative journalist'. In 2024 Mullin published an updated edition of Error of Judgement which included the names of three of the four men responsible for the bombings.

In March 1990, ITV broadcast the Granada Television documentary drama, Who Bombed Birmingham?, which re-enacted the bombings and subsequent key events in Mullin's campaign. Written by Rob Ritchie and directed by Mike Beckham, it featured John Hurt as Mullin, with Martin Shaw as World in Action producer Ian McBride, Ciaran Hinds as Richard McIlkenny, one of the Six, and Patrick Malahide as Michael Mansfield (QC). It was repackaged for export as The Investigation – Inside a Terrorist Bombing, and first shown on American television on 22 April 1990. Granada's BAFTA-nominated follow-up documentary after the release of the six men, World in Action Special: The Birmingham Six – Their Own Story, was telecast on 18 March 1991.

In 2019, Mullin was criticised by the relatives of some of the victims of the attack for not naming IRA bombing suspects whom he met whilst investigating the case in the 1980s. Mullin was called "scum" and a "disgrace". Mullin has defended this decision on the grounds of journalistic ethics. He was quoted in The Guardian as having said: "In order to track down the bombers, I had to give assurances not only to guilty but to innocent intermediaries that I would not, during their lifetime, disclose the names of those who cooperated. Had I not done so, no-one would have cooperated".

=== Bennism and Tribune ===
Mullin edited two collections of Tony Benn's speeches and writings, Arguments for Socialism (1979) and Arguments for Democracy (1981), and, as editor of the left-wing weekly Tribune from 1982 to 1984, provided effective support for Benn and his ideas. Mullin also sought to turn Tribune into a readers' cooperative, to its shareholders' chagrin.

== Novelist ==
Mullin has published a total of four novels. His first novel was A Very British Coup, published in 1982, which portrays the destabilisation of a left-wing British government by the forces of the Establishment. He wrote it having discussed the idea of a left-wing Prime Minister being undermined by the Establishment following the 1981 Labour Party Conference with Peter Hain, Stuart Holland and Tony Banks. Holland revealed in this discussion that he had written a number of chapters in a potential novel containing this story and that Hain had contacted publishers regarding the possibility of a similar novel. Subsequently, Mullin was told by the former BBC correspondent Peter Hardiman Scott that he had been writing a book on this topic at the time.

The novel was adapted for television by Alan Plater, with substantial alterations to the plot, and screened in 1988. The screenwriter was Alan Plater and it was directed by Mick Jackson. Starring Ray McAnally, the series was first screened on Channel 4 and won Bafta and Emmy awards, and was syndicated to more than 30 countries. The book was also the basis for the 2012 four-part Channel 4 series, Secret State. Starring Gabriel Byrne, this version was written by Robert Jones. Mullin later wrote a sequel to A Very British Coup called The Friends of Harry Perkins which was published in 2019. The book explores Brexit and American–Chinese relations amongst other topics.

Mullin also published The Last Man Out of Saigon in 1986 featuring a plot in which a CIA agent sent into Vietnam in the last week of the war to set up a network of agents and also The Year of the Fire Monkey, a thriller about a CIA attempt to assassinate Chairman Mao using a Tibetan agent, in 1991.

== Political career ==
=== Early political career ===
Mullin stood unsuccessfully in the 1970 general election against Liberal Leader Jeremy Thorpe in North Devon. Mullin also fought Kingston-upon-Thames in February 1974.

By 1980, he was an executive member of the Labour Co-ordinating Committee. Mullin was also on the executive of the influential Campaign for Labour Party Democracy. As such he was an active supporter of Tony Benn when, in 1981, disregarding an appeal from party leader Michael Foot to abstain from inflaming the party's divisions, Benn stood against the incumbent Deputy Leader of the Labour Party, Denis Healey. In addition Mullin edited two collections of Benn's speeches and writings Arguments for Socialism (1979) and Arguments for Democracy (1981). He was widely regarded as a leading 'Bennite', a highly influential movement within the Labour Party in the early 1980s.

=== Parliament ===
Mullin was first elected MP for Sunderland South in 1987, and was returned at every subsequent election up to and including 2005. His constituency was the first to declare in every general election between 1992 and his standing down in 2010 (1992, 1997, 2001 and 2005). Mullin joked about being the UK's sole MP for half an hour and muses about forming a government. He did not seek re-election in 2010. Mullin was on the left of the party and his selection for Sunderland South (occasioned by the retirement of Gordon Bagier MP) met with the disapproval of Neil Kinnock, at the time the Leader of the Labour Party. In the late 1980s, the right-wing, tabloid press targeted Mullin for his left-wing views frequently. Headlines included: 'Kinnock's Top Ten Loony Tunes (Mullin was no. 8),'Loony MP back Bomb Gang' (Sun, Jan 29, 1988) '20 things you didn't know about crackpot Chris" (The Sun) and "Mr Odious" {@ {Sun, January 1989)}

Having reported from Cambodia in 1973 and 1980, in 1990 he was outspoken on the British Government's record in Cambodia, being a leading voice in some of the first protracted debates on Britain's provision of clandestine military support to Khmer terrorists, allied to the Khmer Rouge. and attributing increasing public interest in the issue to the documentary films of John Pilger.

He was a member of the Socialist Campaign Group, Secretary of the All-Party Parliamentary Group for Vietnam, a member of the All-Party Group on Tibet and Chair of the All-Party Parliamentary Group for Cambodia, Member of the Home Affairs Select committee (1992–97), and Chairman of the Home Affairs Select Committee from 1997 to 1999 and again from 2001 to 2003. In 2009-10 he was a member of the Parliamentary Reform Committee which among other things recommended that the appointment of select committee chairs should be by election rather than appointment. A reform that was subsequently implemented.

=== In government ===
Despite occasional criticism of the government, he replaced Alan Meale as Parliamentary Under-Secretary of State at the Department of the Environment, Transport, and the Regions in July 1999 before taking over from George Foulkes as Parliamentary Under-Secretary, Department for International Development in 2001.

Despite having voted against the Iraq war, he returned to government in June 2003, as a Parliamentary Under-Secretary at the Foreign and Commonwealth Office in charge of Africa, but after the 2005 election again returned to the backbenches. Before the Labour victory of 1997, Mullin had attained a reputation for campaigning on behalf of victims of injustice and opposition to the curtailing of civil rights. His campaigning stance had to change while a minister because of the collective responsibility of government. His vote against the government's proposal for 90 days' detention without trial for persons suspected of terrorism, as one of 49 Labour rebels, seemed to indicate a re-emergence of his civil libertarian instincts. Mullin criticised the Labour government's rotation of Ministers expressing his belief that the Blair Government changed Ministers too often and noted this in his final speech to the House of Commons.

After leaving government, Mullin also voted against the United Kingdom maintaining a nuclear deterrent.

=== Expenses claims ===
During the UK Parliamentary expenses scandal, Mullin, one of the lowest claimers, provided some comic relief when it was revealed that the television at his second home is a very old black-and-white model with a £45 TV licence.

=== Leaving parliament ===
On 10 May 2008, the Sunderland Echo site reported that Mullin had decided to stand down at the 2010 general election. 'Better to go while people are still asking why, rather than when'. Soon after retiring he moved to a cottage in a walled garden in Northumberland which he restored. It featured on Gardener's World in August 2016. In 2011 he was a judge of the Man Booker Prize. From 2011 to 2017 he was chair of the Heritage Lottery Fund in the North East. In 2017 he was appointed to the Northumberland National Park Authority. In 2023 he was appointed to chair the board of the Tyne and Wear Museums. He is also a trustee of the Chillingham Wild Cattle Association.

=== Diaries ===
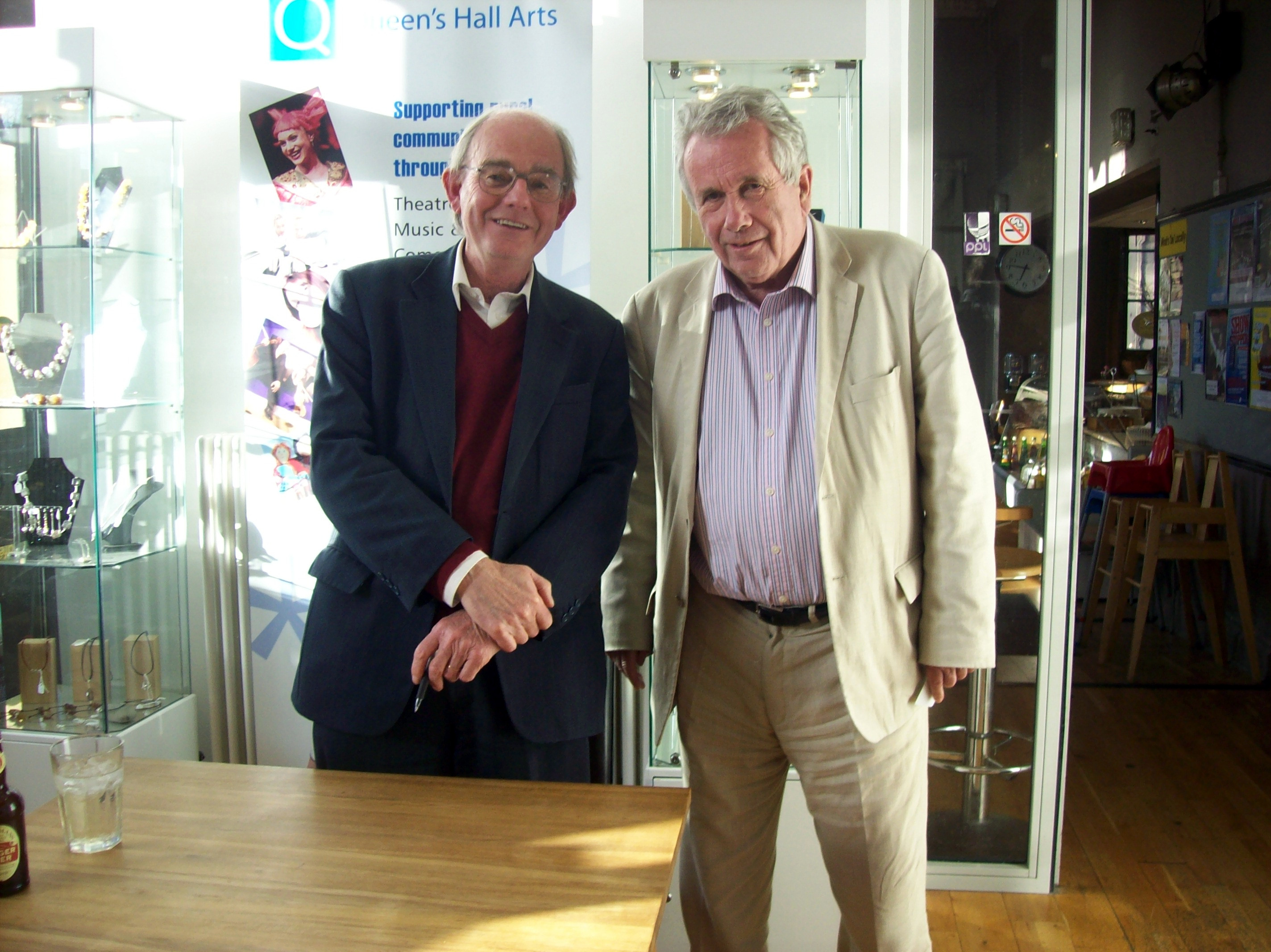
Chris Mullin with Martin Bell at Hexham book festival in 2009

Mullin published four volumes of widely praised diaries. The first three documented the rise and fall of New Labour from the death of the party leader John Smith in 1994 to the 2010 general election: A View from the Foothills (2009) (recounting Mullin's ministerial career from 1999–2005), Decline & Fall: Diaries 2005–2010 (2010) and A Walk-On Part: Diaries 1994–1999 (2011). Among other things, Mullin recorded his gradual disillusion with the Labour Party's left wing and his rather reluctant support, after Smith's death, for fellow North-Eastern MP Tony Blair (whom he dubbed "The Man") as the person most likely to lead the party back to power. He admired Blair as a leader and for his capacity to create a broad-based Labour Party. In spite of Iraq, Mullin remains an admirer of Blair, viewing him as a leader of exceptional ability. Peter Riddell of the Times suggested that A View From the Foothills deserved to become "the central text for understanding the Blair years", while Decline & Fall, in which Mullin (by then a backbencher again) expressed wry consternation at the way the government operated under Blair's successor Gordon Brown, were commended for their independence of outlook, revealing, as Jenni Russell put it in the Sunday Times, Mullin's "readiness to like people who don't echo his politics".

The first three volumes were adapted for the stage by Michael Chaplin as A Walk on Part. It premiered at the Live Theatre in Newcastle-upon-Tyne in May 2011, before moving to the Soho Theatre in London. Mullin regularly gives talks on his diaries, politics and the rise and fall of New Labour.

The fourth volume, Didn’t You Use to Be Chris Mullin? Diaries 2010–2022, chronicling the post-parliamentary period of his life, from the fallout of the 2010 general election to the death of Queen Elizabeth II, was released in May 2023.

== Personal life ==
Mullin and his wife, Nguyen Thi Ngoc, who he met while in Vietnam, married in April 1987, in Ho Chi Minh City, had two daughters, and live in Callaly, Northumberland. His hobbies include gardening.

In football he supports Sunderland A.F.C., and mentioned it in the May 1997 State Opening of Parliament speech.

== Honours ==
On 28 January 2011, his alma mater, Hull University, awarded him an honorary Doctorate in Law, in recognition of his achievements. In December 2011, Newcastle University awarded Chris Mullin an honorary degree. Mullin also taught a module at Newcastle University called 'The Rise and Fall of New Labour'. He was also awarded an honorary degree by the University of Essex in 2011. Mullin has also received honorary degrees from the University of Sunderland (2010) and City University London (1992).

On 12 June 2026, it was announced that he has been awarded a knighthood by Charles III as part of the 2026 UK Birthday Honours “for political and public service”.

== Works ==
=== Novels ===
- A Very British Coup (1982)
- The Last Man Out of Saigon (1986)
- The Year of the Fire Monkey (1991)
- The Friends of Harry Perkins (2019)

=== Non-fiction ===
- Error of Judgment: The Truth about the Birmingham Bombings (ISBN 978-1-85371-365-1)
- A View from the Foothills: The Diaries of Chris Mullin (2009) (ISBN 978-1-84668-223-0)
- Decline & Fall: Diaries 2005–2010 (2010) (ISBN 978-1-84668-399-2)
- A Walk-On Part: Diaries 1994–1999 (2011) (ISBN 978-1-84668-523-1)
- Hinterland (2016) (ISBN 978-1-78125-605-3)
- Didn’t You Use to Be Chris Mullin? Diaries 2010–2022 (2023) (ISBN 978-1-78590-791-3)

=== As editor ===
- Tony Benn Arguments for Socialism (1979) Penguin Books ISBN 978-0-14-005489-7
- Tony Benn Arguments for Democracy (1981) Jonathan Cape ISBN 978-0-224-01878-4

Parliament of the United Kingdom
Preceded by Gordon Bagier	Member of Parliament for Sunderland South; 1987–2010	Succeeded by seat abolished
Media offices
Preceded by Richard Clements	Editor of Tribune; 1982–1984	Succeeded by Nigel Williamson
Non-profit organization positions
Preceded by Pierre Schori	Board Chair, International Alert; 2016–2018	Succeeded by Carey Cavanaugh
