= The Sacramento Union =

Former daily newspaper in California

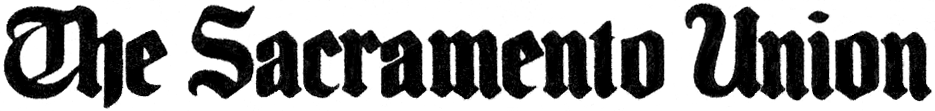
- "The Oldest Daily in the West"
- The March 19, 1851 front page of the first edition of The Sacramento Union
- Type: Daily newspaper
- Format: Broadsheet
- Founder: Charles L. Hansicker
- Founded: March 19, 1851
- Ceased publication: January 14, 1994
- Language: English
- Headquarters: 301 Capitol Mall; Sacramento, CA 95814
- Circulation: 105,000 (at max)
- ISSN: 2641-1792
- OCLC number: 8804968

The Sacramento Union was a daily newspaper founded in 1851 in Sacramento, California. It was the oldest daily newspaper west of the Mississippi River before it closed its doors after 143 years in January 1994, no longer able to compete with The Sacramento Bee, which was founded in 1857.

== History ==
=== Origins ===
The first newspaper published for Sutter's Fort, which was the start of Sacramento, was the Placer Times. It first a published by E.C. Kemble on April 28, 1849. Other papers soon followed, including the Sacramento Transcript, founded on April 1, 1850. The battle between those two papers was so fierce, that workers faced serious wage cuts. A group of eight disgruntled journeymen printers left the Times and the Transcript to start their own morning daily newspaper called the Sacramento Daily Union. The name "Union" was selected in reference to the group of printers running the business and being pro-Unionist.

The paper was first issued on Wednesday, March 19, 1851. Charles L. Hansicker was publisher and head of the firm with included six other proprietors. Dr. John F. Morse, a physician in charge of a local hospital, was hired as editor. On the front page of the first issue, Morse wrote: "It will be our aim to publish the first news in the best style and at the lowest prices." On June 1, 1851, the firm launched the Steamer Union, an edition of the paper focused on California news for circulation in the Atlantic states.

In January 1852, publisher Hansicker exited the firm, which at that time was taken over by E.J. Jefferies. On January 10, 1852, the firm launched a weekly edition called the Weekly Union. In May 1852, editor Morse exited the business. He was succeeded by A.C. Russell, who after four months was replaced as editor by Lauren S. Upson. In June 1852, the firm launched an illustrated sheet with engravings on California subjects called the Pictorial Union. In October 1852, Henry W. Larkin and Paul Morrill bought a controlling interest in the firm.

On November 2, 1852, the paper's office at 121 J Street was destroyed in a fire called the Great Conflagration. More than 80% of structures in Sacramento were burned. The plant was rebuilt on the same spot. In May 1853, business manager James Anthony became a co-owner. Anthony, Larkin and Morrill eventually became the paper's sole owners, with Anthony was the lead partner. At that time, circulation was 500.

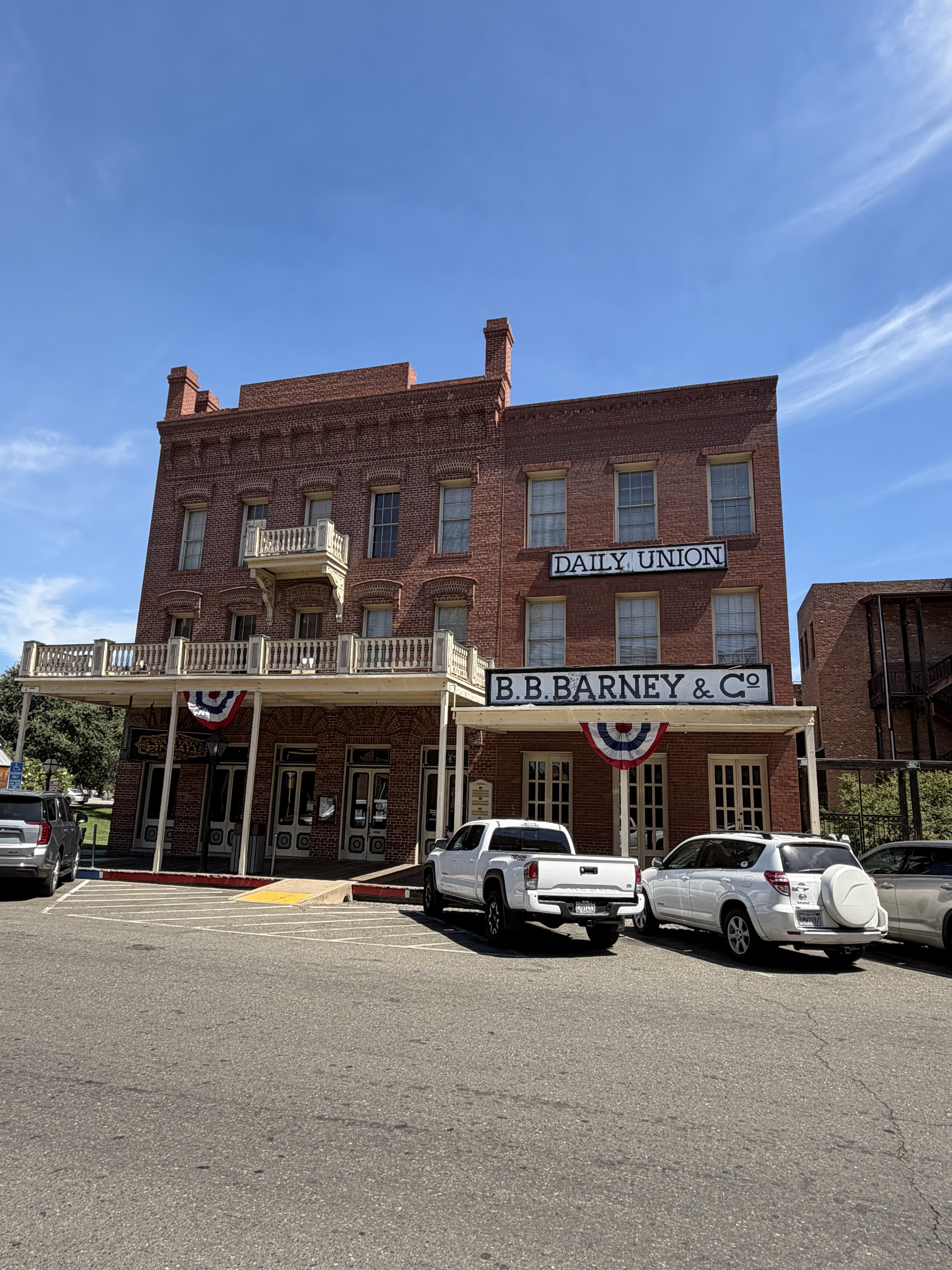
A building at 117-121 J Street in Old Sacramento, a reconstruction of the Sacramento Daily Union building erected in 1851.

During the American Civil War, editor Upson wrote in support of the Union, and was often called the journalist who kept California from joining the The Confederacy. Upson was a friend of Theodore Judah and the Central Pacific Railroad, and called for the first public meeting to fundraise for First transcontinental railroad. He was also instrumental in establishing Sacramento's public school system, flood control, hospitals and other civic improvements

In May 1861, the paper relocated to a new building at 1017 Third Street. The total cost of the new plant was $18,000. In 1863, Anthony began penning editorials in opposition to Collis Potter Huntington and the Big Four Railroaders, believing the industrialists and their railroad corporations too powerful in the state. In 1864, editor Upson retired due to failing health. During the 1867 California gubernatorial election, the Union was in opposition to circuit court clerk and railroad lobbyist George Congdon Gorham, which contributed to his defeat.

=== Mark Twain and The Union ===
Humorist Samuel Langhorne Clemens, who is better known by his pen name of Mark Twain, was the most famous contributor to the Sacramento Union, although his limited involvement in the newspaper would be over emphasized by Union staff in the century to follow. After Clemens, then age 30, resigned from the San Francisco Morning Call in early 1866, he was without work for months. It was then he approached James Anthony, one of the owners of the Union who was a good friend, and pitched him the idea of paying him to travel to the Sandwich Islands (modern day Hawaii) and then write to the paper of his experiences. The publisher agreed.

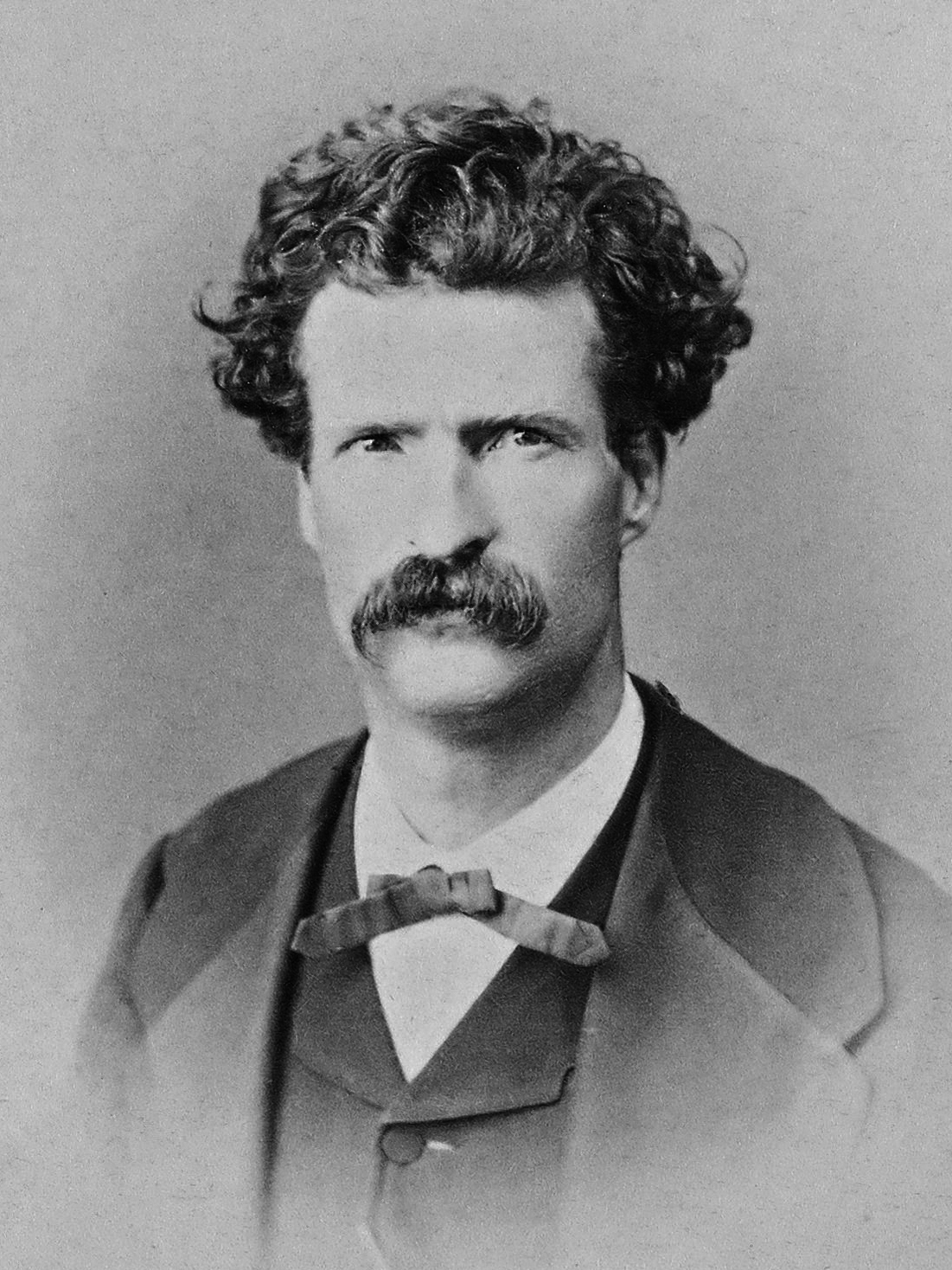
Mark Twain, photographed in 1867, a year after his Hawaiian trip

On March 7, 1866, Clemens left San Francisco aboard the steamboat Ajax. He sent the Union a total of 25 letters for publication from his four months abroad. His 15th letter, published on July 19, was a detailed account on the loss of Hornet and a lifeboat containing its remaining 15 crew members washing ashore at Laupāhoehoe, Hawaii. Clemens was assisted in his reporting by diplomat Anson Burlingame, who snuck him into the hospital by having him carried in by stretcher. Burlingame interview the crewmembers while Clemens took notes.

In total, Clemens wrote 90,000 words during his trip to Hawaii, with about 35,000 of those words later republished in his travel memoir, "Roughing It," with another 5,000 new words added. Upon returning to Sacramento, Clemens charged the Union $20 for each week he travelled, per their agreement, and an extra $100 for the Hornet story. The cashier declined to pay the extra amount but one of the owners never hesitated to pay and laughed at the situation.

Afterward, Clemens was one of two unsigned reporters to cover the California State Fair for the Union in September 1866. His contributions to the paper ended there. Author Edgar M. Branch speculated this last assignment was either a favor to the owner or one last stab at journalism, an opportunity to join the paper's staff with the experience contributing to Clemens' decision to abandon local reporting for good and focus on lecturing, which propelled his career.

In the years to follow, there was a belief shared amongst Union staff was that one of the desks at the paper's office belonged to Clemens. One writer incorrectly believed for years he had used Clemens' desk, and was disappointed upon learning the truth. During the Great Depression, journalist Herb Caen claimed that staff, to keep the Union in business, would take battered old desks from their office and sell them for $100, falsely claiming they were "Mark Twain's Desk." In 1937, Grabhorn Press republished the Clemens letters for the first time in book form, titled, "Letters From Hawaii."

After the paper's new office at 301 Capital Mall was completed in 1968, its lobby was named in Twain's honor. A collection of Twain memorabilia was put on display there for visitors and a bronze bust of Twain was a focal point in the room. Artist Walter Russell was commissioned by the Mark Twain Memorial Foundation to create the bust in honor of Twain's 100th birthday. It was unveiled at dinner held at the Ritz-Carlton Hotel (New York City) and later was housed in Great Britain, but returned to the United States during WWII. Publisher James S. Copley later bought the bust for the Copley Library until giving it to the Union. From then on, the bust featured a plaque inscribed with an excerpt Twain wrote on his time writing for the Union, calling it "a great and influential daily journal." After the Union ceased, the bust was donated to UC Davis and ever since housed at the Shields Library.

In 1974, from November 11–20, the Union and Western Airlines organized a sight-seeing tour for up to 300 people to follow in Twain's footsteps in Hawaii. Tickets were $597, and the group included Union staff and a Mark Twain impersonator.

=== Mid 19th to Mid 20th century (1867-1966) ===
In February 1867, a rival paper called The Daily Record was first published in Sacramento. It was founded by James J. Keegan, and was under the influence of the Central Pacific Railroad. In 1870, the Record was enlarged, larger than the Union. That same, year, the railroad company banned carriers from selling copies of the Union on its cars. At that time the Union had a circulation of 24,000 (9,000 daily, 15,000 weekly), making it the largest of more than 90 papers published in California. The New-York Tribune called the Union the "miners' Bible" due to how many gold prospectors read it.

In April 1872, Capt. A.D. Wood, of Vallejo, and William H. Mills bought the Record from Kegan. In October 1874, Wood sold out to Hill. In December 1875, the Union was put up for sale at auction by W.H. Larkin, James Anthony and Paul Morrill. The only bid was placed by Morrill at $65,000. Years earlier the three declined an offer to sell the paper for $250,000. The Union owners voided the auction and then entered into negotiations to sell the paper for much less to the Central Pacific Railroad. In February 1875, the Union was acquired by an association of property owners for $45,000, with Mills acquiring a large stake. On Feb. 22, the Record and Union merged to form the Sacramento Record-Union. By 1901, CPR, which had become Southern Pacific Railroad, was looking to sell the Record-Union, having lost an average of $2,000 a month operating it, a total loss of $750,000.

Two years later, SPR and Mills divested from the business, leaving the paper entirely in the hands of the Pacific Improvement Company. In June 1903, Alfred Holman bought the Record-Union, and soon dropped the word "Record" from the name. In December 1906, Holman sold the Union to E.A. Forbes, owner of the Marysville Appeal and Chico Enterprise-Post, for $100,000. A month later Holman bought The Argonaut. In February 1908, the Calkins Newspaper Syndicate bought the Union for $175,000. In July 1908, a group of 300 residents appeared at the Union's office demanding editor Leonard S. Calkins retract an editorial against Mayor Clinton L. White and the city itself. In March 1909, creditors took control of the Union and put L.E. Bontz in charge. Two months later and the Calkins Newspaper Syndicate declared bankruptcy. All of the company's remaining papers were acquired by the Union Trust Company. In November 1910, Bontz bought the Union.

Lynn C. Simpson became a co-owner in June 1914, and the two sold the Union to C.M. Wooster in August 1918, followed by Ben S. Allen and John S. Craig in May 1919. Allen bought out Craig in February 1920, and sold the Union to James D. Meredith in August 1921. The paper relocated for the second time in 71 years to 1910 M Street in October 1921. Benjamin E. Bradley became a co-owner in June 1923, and the two sold the Union to W.W. Chapin in February 1925. Carl H. Brockhagen was another Union co-owner, who acquired the Portland Telegram in September 1927. Chapin sold his stake in the Union to C.A. Hughes in March 1928. Brockhagen acquired the San Francisco Bulletin in September 1928. Hughes left the Union in May 1929 and Brockhagen then put his son Robert "Bob" Brockhagen in charge.

On September 1, 1929, William H. Dodge, of Beverly Hills, formerly a general manager at Scripps Howard, bought the Union from Brockhagen and Herbert Fleischhacker. Dodge then became its publisher. In January 1948, Dodge was the passenger in an automobile heading to Coronado for the annual California Newspaper Publishers Association convention when it collided with a truck in Bellflower. Dodge was hospitalized, and died from his injuries that October. He was age 68. Dodge's son-in-law William A. Simpson Jr. succeed him as publisher. In May 1962, a group of 50 local businessmen formed a corporation to buy the paper. At that time Leonard V. Finder was named publisher. Over the past decade the paper had doubled its circulation to 60,000.

=== Conservatism and The Bee rivalry (1966-1989) ===
In February 1966, the paper's board of directors voted to sell the paper to Copley Press, and shareholders voted to approve the deal that March. Copley Press paid $2.64 million. At that time the morning Union had a circulation of 65,000 while the afternoon Bee had a circulation of 169,000. Board chairman James S. Copley was a conservative with close ties to the Republican Party. The deal was completed that May, and thus, the Union became editorially pro-Republican. A year later, in April 1967, board chairman Copley and Governor Ronald Reagan broke ground at the Capitol Mall on a new headquarters to house a new long-run, photo-offset press.

In December 1974, Conservative John P. McGoff, president of Panax Corp., bought the Union from Copley Press, which had lost money every year it owned it. McGoff immediately sold off four of the paper's 10 printing presses, laid off 20% of staff and leased out the building's top two floors. In January 1977, the Union filed a $3 million antitrust lawsuit against McClatchy Newspapers, owners of the Bee, accusing the company of operating an illegal mass media monopoly in the Sacramento and San Joaquin valleys. In response, McClatchy countersued, accusing its rival of deliberately and illegally selling advertising and subscriptions at a loss in order to damage the Bee.

In December 1977, McGoff sold a 50% stake in Sierra Publishing Co., which published the Union, to conservative banker Richard Mellon Scaife for $13 million. That same month, the Bee announced it will add a morning edition stating January 23, 1978, putting it head-to-head with the Union. In response, the Union filed for a preliminary injunction to stop the Bee, but a judge denied the request. In April 1978, the Bee switched all editions to the morning after the Mailers Union went on strike. The change was made permanent that June. The Union tried to capitalize on this change by launching an afternoon "Five-Star" edition but discontinued if after seven weeks.

In June 1979, a South Africa government commission linked McGoff to the Muldergate scandal. An investigation reveled that five years earlier, McGoff was secretly given $10 million by the country's Department of Information to purchase The Washington Star in an attempt to further foreign interests. After his bid proved unsuccessful, McGoff used $6 million from the slush fund to buy the Union, with the total sale price at $7.75 million. In July 1979, McClatchy filed a motion to dismiss the suit after McGoff ignored a subpoena to appear in court and answer questions regarding the source of funds he used to buy the Union. The judge denied the dismissal request, but did give McGoff a $10,000 fine. In August 1979, McGoff and McClatchy tentatively agreed to each drop their suit and countersuit.

In August 1980, the Union's executive staff was restructured and a long-range plan to expand the circulation size and scope was announced. This happened amid rumors McGoff was looking to sell his 50% stake, which he denied. In January 1982, McGoff sold out to Scaife. At that time the Union's daily circulation was 112,409 while the Bee's was 217,000. On August 15, 1988, the Union switched from the standard broadsheet size to a tabloid, and launched a marketing campaign with the slogan "Grab the Tab." That year the paper lost an estimated $5 million as circulation declined to 83,272.

=== Final years and closure (1989-1994) ===
In July 1989, Scaife agreed to sell the Union to local real estate developers Daniel "Danny" Benvenuti Jr., age 35, and David Kassis, age 29. About 300 employees were laid off and then rehired. That December the deal was finalized. They paid $7 million for the Union, and primarily bought it in order to build a skyscraper on the property. But the real-estate market cooled and the project never martialized. In January 1990, James H. Smith was named publisher. A month later the paper announced plans to revert back to broadsheet.

In August 1990, Joseph Farah was named editor. The Southern Poverty Law Center reported "circulation dropped by more than 25% as Farah dragged the already conservative paper sharply to the right during his 15 months at its helm. A former Union journalist said Farah was "a mouthpiece for the fundamentalist Christian right, preoccupied with abortion, homosexuals and creationism." Smith resigned in August 1991, and Farah resigned in October 1991. The two then founded the Western Journalism Center.

In June 1992, a group of investors led by real-estate developer Greg Hardcastle and J. J. McClatchy, whose family owned the Bee, announced plans to by the Union. The paper's printing plant and office building were not included in the deal. At that time Union circulation was 61,465 compared to the Bee at 264,462. Both Smith and Farah were to be hired back as publisher and editor once the deal was done. But McClatchy soon backed out and the sale was postponed. That August, in anticipation of the sale, the Union sold off its press to another paper in Mexico and contracted Herald Printing Co., a local commercial printer. About 15 jobs were eliminated.

However, the deal kept on getting delayed, but an agreement was eventually reached with Hardcastle, only for it to officially fall through in early October 1992. The reason was Hardcastle failed to secure the millions needed to operate the business. The deal, priced at $200,000, was only for the paper's name, advertising and circulation lists. By then circulation had fallen to 40,000. Benvenuti Jr. lost almost $7 million just keeping the paper afloat. Later in October, Herald Printing Co., headed by Ralph Danel Jr., acquired the Union and promised to maintain its Conservative voice. All 119 employees were rehired. Danel Jr. became publisher and hired Steven Morales as associate publisher and general manager.

Danel Jr. lost $100,000 every month he kept the Union open. To stem the losses, he cut staff by 25%. In October 1993, the Union decreased publication from seven to three days a week. Circulation then was 35,000. The losses continued and the formerly daily Union published its final edition on Friday, January 14, 1994. The cover featured a color photo of the paper's last staff under the blaring headline, "We're history," coined by the newspaper's last editor, Ken Harvey. The final circulation count was 31,500. In 1999, Danel Jr. donated the Union's bound print archive and Mark Twain bust to the Sacramento State University Library. The collection was appraised at $60,000.

== Revival attempt ==
=== Magazine (2004-2005) ===
On February 9, 2004, the Western Journalism Center, which operated the American far-right website WorldNetDaily and was led by Smith and Farah, announced plans to relaunch the Sacramento Union as a daily news site at SacUnion.com with a monthly glossy magazine. Smith was named publisher. Farah served on the new Union's adversity board. The revived news outlet was described as politically Conservative.

In August 2004, Kenneth E. Grubbs Jr. was named editor. Grubbs Jr. previously worked as director of the National Journalism Center until he was fired. On October 1, 2004, an expanded website was launched. In November 2004, the magazine's first bi-monthly edition was published. After an investor backed out, nine staffers were let go and the print magazine was discontinued in May 2005.

=== Tabloid (2006-2009) ===
On July 21, 2006, the Western Journalism Center relaunched the Union's print edition, this time as a tabloid-sized free bi-weekly newspaper disturbed at local newsstands In April 2007, the Union made the unusual move to pay to run two pages of Conservative editorial content in the left-leaning Sacramento News & Review for 13 weeks. In March 2009, editor-in-chief James Dutra announced the tabloid had ceased and the Union's website was soon taken offline.

== Newspaper building ==
On December 8, 1968, the Sacramento Union dedicated its new office at 301 Capitol Mall in downtown Sacramento several years after Copley Press purchased the property. In 1989, Danny Benvenuti purchased the business, and sold it two years later. However, he kept the property and leased it back to the paper. He planned to construct a high-rise office space at the paper's headquarters, but by 1997, the plan was abandoned.

In 2004, John Saca partnered with CalPERS and bought the site. He planned to build a $500 million hotel and condominium project with two 53-story towers. The project was called the "Towers on Capitol Mall". In October 2005, crews demolition crews razed the old daily Union office building. Construction halted in 2007 as project costs ballooned. The lot remained vacant for years. In 2024, Shingle Springs Band of Miwok Indians purchased the land for $17 million.

== Archives ==
=== Print ===
The Special Collections department of the Shields Library at UC Davis is home to 660 bound volumes of the newspaper. The library also has photograph from 1966 to 1994, newspaper chippings organized by subject from 1972 through 1992, along with business records from the last eighteen months The Union was in business. Microfilmed copies of the paper are available from 1851 to 1854; 1856-1864 and 1869–1994.

=== Digitized ===
The California Digital Newspaper Collection at UC Riverside has digitized copies of the newspaper available online for free. This collection encompasses 36,834 issues containing 536,183 pages published from March 19, 1851, to April 30, 1966.

The Chronicling America collection by the Library of Congress has digitized copies of the Sacramento Daily Record-Union available online for free dating from 1880 to 1899.

Newspapers.com has digitized copies of the newspaper available online for a paid subscription, with 1,197,480 searchable pages dating from 1880 to 1991.

== Notable staff ==
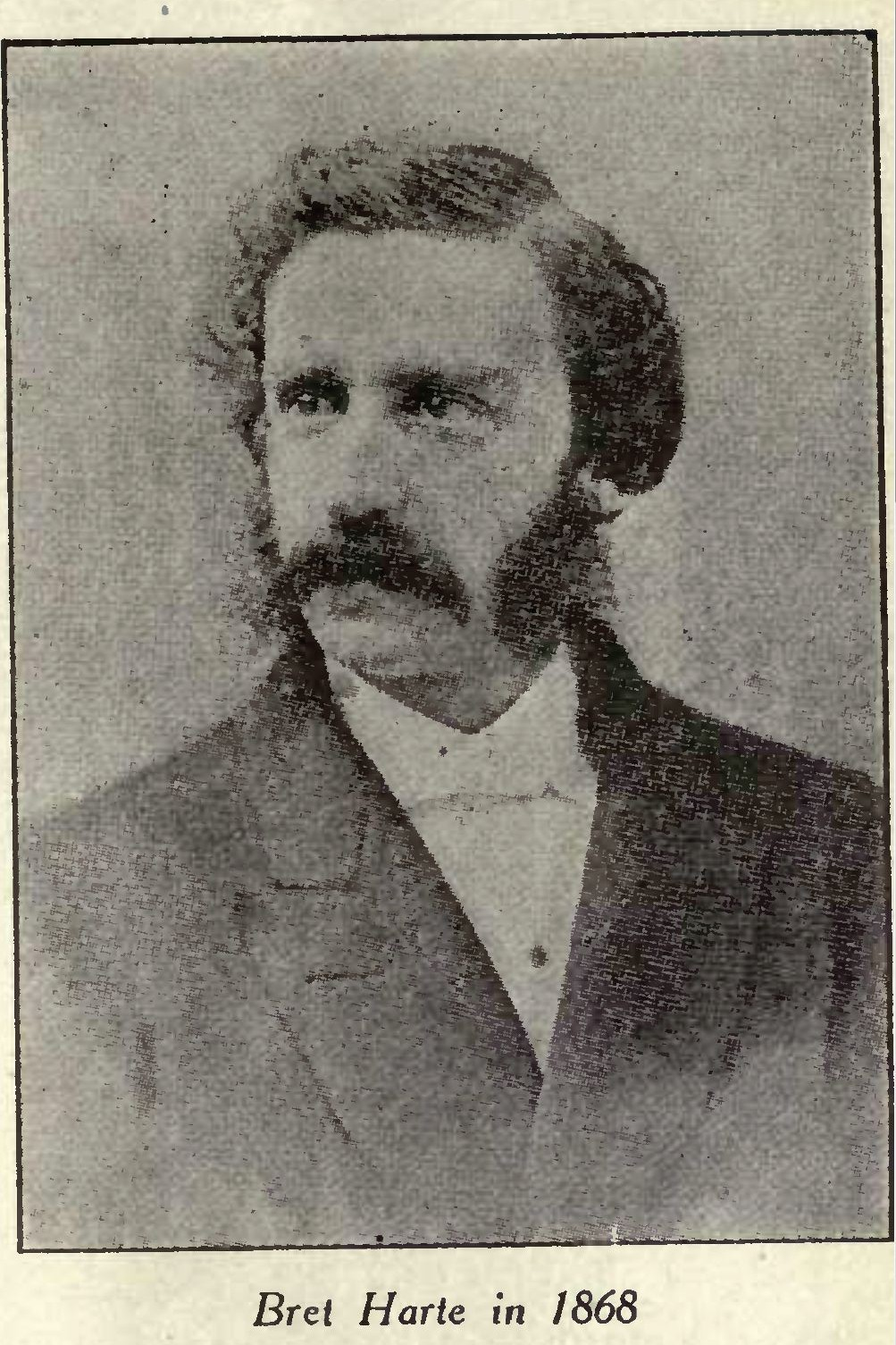
Union writer Bret Harte in 1868

- Bret Harte
- Charles Fayette McGlashan - Correspondent (Utah)
- Dan De Quille
- Eliza D. Keith
- Edward Augustus Dickson - Reporter
- Herb Caen - Sports writer
- Joseph Farah - Editor
- Mark Twain - Correspondent (Hawaii)
- Thomas Gardiner, one of the founders of the Los Angeles Times, publisher of the Union in 1852.

=== California Newspaper Hall of Fame ===
As of 2026, three former journalists have been inducted by the California Press Foundation into the California Newspaper Hall of Fame for their work at the Sacramento Union. They are editor Lauren Upson (1959), publisher James Anthony (1962) and associate editor Edward C. Kemble (1974).
