= The Argonaut =

Literary publication in San Francisco

- Editor: Frank M. Pixley; Alfred Holman
- Founder: Frank Somers
- Founded: 1877
- Final issue: 1956

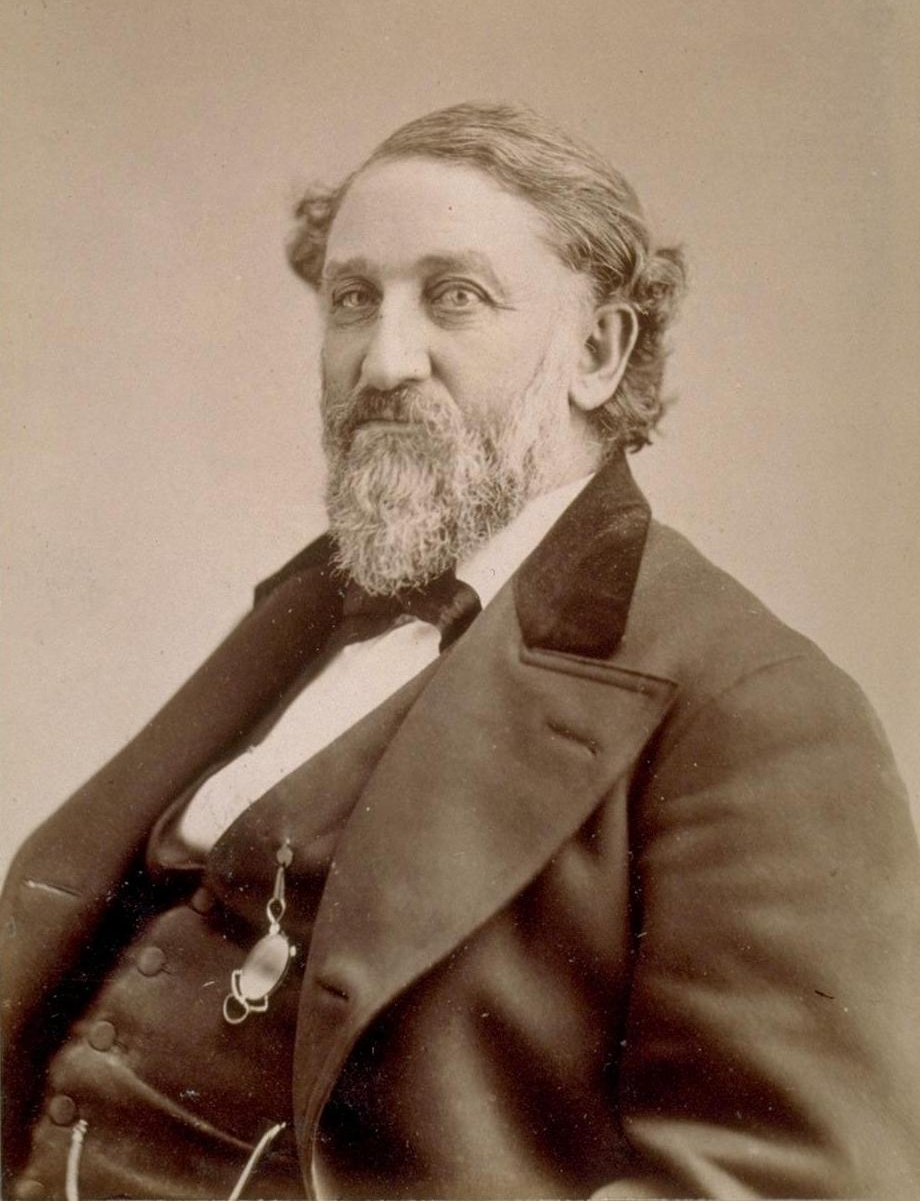
Frank M. Pixley, longtime editor and publisher of The Argonaut

The Argonaut was a newspaper based in San Francisco, California from 1878 to 1956. It was founded by Frank Somers, and soon taken over by Frank M. Pixley, who built it into a highly regarded publication. Under Pixley's stewardship it was considered "the leading literary production of the San Francisco press and was a powerful influence in State and municipal politics."

The magazine was known for containing strong political Americanism combined with art and literature. Many 19th-century writers such as Ambrose Bierce, Yda Addis, Emma Frances Dawson, and Gertrude Atherton appeared regularly in its pages. It was considered one of the most important publications in California, and it had a great deal of political influence.

As a staunch Republican, Pixley used The Argonaut to support Leland Stanford and other owners of the Central Pacific Railroad. Pixley, who served as The Argonaut's editor and publisher, had been California's eighth attorney general when Stanford was governor. The journal was founded as a counterweight to Denis Kearney, an Irish-born labor leader who represented many of the Irish immigrants who worked for the railroad. Pixley, who wanted someday to become governor of California himself, was said to have handed out gold coins to sway voters.

Jerome Hart became editor in 1891. Pixley sold the journal before his death in 1895 for $11,000.00. This period was seen as a low point in The Argonaut's quality.

Alfred Holman purchased the newspaper in 1907, shortly after selling all his interests in the Sacramento Union. He served as publisher and editor until 1924.

The title comes from the local term for gold prospectors during the California gold rush, who were called argonauts.

== Modern publications using the same title ==
In the early 1990s, Warren Hinckle launched a print publication titled The Argonaut, and an online version called Argonaut360. Hinckle made a jocular claim to continuity with the original publication (along with some colorful embellishments on the original publication's history), and used numbering consistent with the original publication. In 1990, the San Francisco Historical Society also launched a journal called The Argonaut.
