= William Veeder =

Professor

- Born: September 14, 1940 (age 86); Denver, Colorado, U.S.

Academic background
- Education: University of Notre Dame; University of Iowa; University of California, Berkeley; Iowa Writers' Workshop

Academic work
- Discipline: Literature
- Institutions: University of Chicago

William Veeder (born September 14, 1940) is a scholar of 19th-century American and British literature and a professor emeritus in the Department of English at the University of Chicago.

== Early life ==
William Veeder was born on September 14, 1940, in Denver, Colorado to Virginia Holderness and lawyer William H. Veeder. He grew up in Arlington, Virginia.

== Education ==
William Veeder completed his undergraduate studies at Notre Dame, and then spent two years at the University of Iowa Writers’ Workshop, where he earned his Master of Fine Arts. Veeder received his Ph.D. from the University of California at Berkeley in 1969, and joined the faculty at the University of Chicago that same year.

He received the Quantrell Award in 1975.

== Critical methodology ==
William Veeder’s critical methodology is primarily rooted in psychoanalysis and gender studies, but he is also a strong advocate of close reading, a critical approach whereby “one gets to content through form”. He is guided by a quote from an art criticism essay written by Henry James, in which James asserted, “In the arts, feeling is always meaning.” Veeder begins his classes with this quote, usually underlining the words “always” and "meaning” and capitalizing the word “always.”

== Works ==
Veeder has been working for over 40 years on a historical novel named "Pierce" about Ambrose Bierce and Emma Frances Dawson, which as of 2026 was unpublished.

Veeder's publications include:

- Henry James, the Lessons of the Master: Popular Fiction and Personal Style in the Nineteenth Century. U of Chicago P, 1975.
- The Woman Question: Society and Literature in Britain and America, 1837–1883, Volume 1: Defining Voices. Elizabeth K. Helsinger, Robin Lauterbach Sheets, William Veeder. U of Chicago P, 1989, c1983.
- The Woman Question: Society and Literature in Britain and America, 1837–1883, Volume 2: Social Issues. Elizabeth K. Helsinger, Robin Lauterbach Sheets, William Veeder. U of Chicago P, 1989, c1983.
- Mary Shelley & Frankenstein: the Fate of Androgyny. U of Chicago P, 1986.
- Dr. Jekyll and Mr. Hyde: After One Hundred Years. Edited by William Veeder and Gordon Hirsch. U of Chicago P, 1988.
- Art of Criticism. Edited by William Veeder and Susan M. Griffin. U of Chicago P, 1988.

His essays have appeared in:

- The Henry James Review
- New essays on The portrait of a lady. Edited by Joel Porte. Cambridge University Press, 1990.
- Henry James: the shorter fiction, reassessments. Edited by N.H. Reeve. St. Martin’s Press, 1997.
- American gothic: new interventions in a national narrative. Edited by Robert K. Martin & Eric Savoy. University of Iowa Press, c1998.
- Mary Shelley’s Frankenstein. Edited and introduced by Harold Bloom.
