= R. H. Beamer House =

Historic house in California, United States

- U.S. National Register of Historic Places
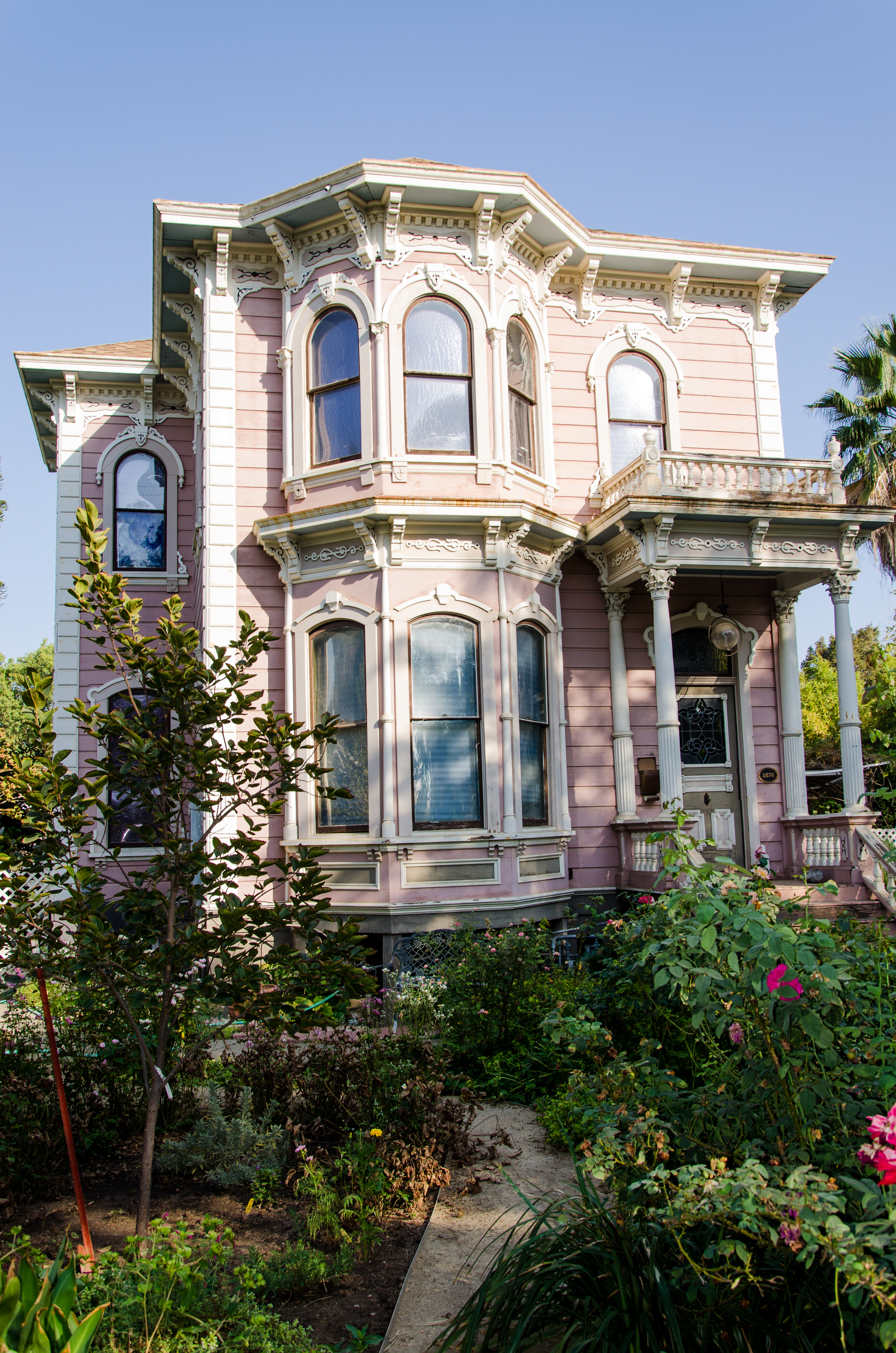

- Location within California Location within the United States
- Location: 19 3rd St., Woodland, California
- Coordinates: 38°41′2″N 121°46′9″W
- Area: 0.4 acres (0.16 ha)
- Built: 1904
- Architectural style: Italianate
- NRHP reference No.: 82002283
- Added to NRHP: August 2, 1982

The R. H. Beamer House, also known as the Beamer-Schell House, is a historic house located at 19 3rd St. in Woodland, California. Built in 1904, the house was designed in the Italianate style, of which it has been called "an outstanding example". The house's design features a hipped roof with two chimneys, wide eaves, and a denticulated cornice with many brackets. The front entrance is a portico supported by Corinthian columns and pilasters and topped by a balustrade. The front of the house features a two-story bay with three windows on each story; the south side of the house has a similar bay.

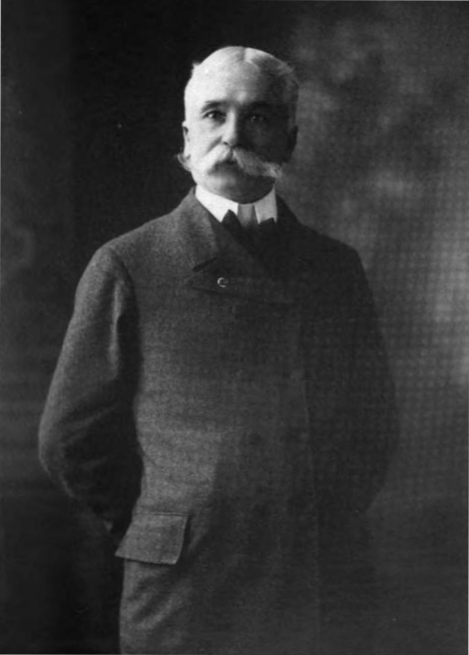
Richard Henderson Beamer

The house was built for Richard Henderson Beamer, a prominent resident whom The Sacramento Union described as "Woodland's chief citizen". The onetime mayor of Woodland, Beamer also held many other political offices at the state and county level. Beamer also played an important role in local banking as a director and later president of the Farmers and Merchants Bank of Woodland. In addition, Beamer helped establish the Woodland Public Library and planted the trees in the surrounding park himself.

The R. H. Beamer House was added to the National Register of Historic Places on August 2, 1982.
