= Chris Gaubatz =

American national security consultant

- Born: Chris Allen Gaubatz
- Occupation: National security consultant
- Known for: Undercover work for Muslim Mafia

Chris Allen Gaubatz is an American national security consultant who is known for posing as an intern for the Council on American–Islamic Relations (CAIR) in order to gather information on the group's inner workings, which were published in the 2009 book Muslim Mafia by his father Paul David Gaubatz and Paul Sperry. The Southern Poverty Law Center and The Intercept have described Gaubatz as a conspiracy theorist.

== Early life and career ==
Gaubatz is the son of Paul David Gaubatz, a former Air Force Office of Special Investigations (OSI) Special Agent, and he grew up in England, Korea, California, and Utah. He later worked for several Fortune 500 companies, conducting fraud investigations, asset protection, and insurance sales. He began investigating CAIR in 2007, by posing as an intern and attending conferences affiliated with the organization.

== Undercover for Muslim Mafia ==
For his undercover operation at CAIR, later to be published in the book Muslim Mafia: Inside the Secret Underworld That's Conspiring to Islamize America, Gaubatz called himself David Marshall, an alleged Muslim student at Ferrum College. Gaubatz worked undercover for six months in the organization as part of the operation. The book was championed by at least four Republican members of the U.S. House at the time of its publication. CAIR later filed a federal lawsuit against Gaubatz and his father for stealing 12,000 documents from the organization. Several of CAIR's claims were later dismissed in court.

== Later activities ==
Gaubatz later served as Vice President of former FBI agent John Guandolo's organization Understanding the Threat (UTT), designated an anti-Muslim "hate group" by the Southern Poverty Law Center (SPLC), and considered a part of the counter-jihad movement.

In 2016, Gaubatz represented UTT at a congressional hearing on radical Islam at the invitation of Senator Ted Cruz. According to the SPLC "in his testimony, Gaubatz shared his story of infiltration and pushed other anti-Muslim conspiracy theories." Gaubatz reportedly "accused prominent Muslim-American charities of being front groups for Hamas and the Muslim Brotherhood, and said that 'the global Islamic movement' had infiltrated the FBI and Department of Homeland Security." Gaubatz also accused the two Muslim Reps. Keith Ellison and André Carson of having ties to the Muslim Brotherhood, due to the two having attended an Islamic Society of North America (ISNA) event, which Gaubatz claimed to be a front group for the Muslim Brotherhood.

When working for UTT, Gaubatz along with Guandolo traveled throughout the country providing training seminars to law enforcement and civilians on the "jihadi threat". Gaubatz left UTT in 2018. After his resignation from UTT, Gaubatz became president of the RAIR Foundation, or Rise Align Ignite Reclaim, which was founded by prolific anti-Muslim Twitter user Amy Mek, who was exposed as Amy Mekelburg by HuffPost the same year. Gaubatz has also worked with ACT for America.

In local Republican Party and Tea Party movement events since his resignation from UTT in 2018 Gaubatz has claimed that CAIR consists of "suit-wearing jihadis" whose ideology is "indistinguishable from that of al-Qaeda or the Islamic State," and suggested that the refugee resettlement program is "a way for terrorists to infiltrate the U.S." He has also claimed that Muslims "have a religious duty to lie in furtherance of jihad," and that "there is no such thing as radical Islam, only Islam." He has also alluded to a conspiracy theory that radical Muslims were involved with the 2017 Las Vegas shooting.
