= Paul E. Sperry =

American journalist

- Education: University of Texas at Austin (BA)
- Occupations: Investigative journalist, author
- Notable work: Muslim Mafia (2009)

Paul E. Sperry is an American conservative author, writer and investigative journalist. He is currently a reporter for RealClearInvestigations.

Sperry previously served as Washington bureau chief for Investor's Business Daily and WorldNetDaily, and has been a media fellow at the Hoover Institution. He has written books and articles critical of the Bush administration and the Obama administration. His writings have also been described as anti-Muslim, and he has served as editor-in-chief of the website counterjihad.com. He has regularly appeared on Fox News, and has a Bachelor of Arts from the University of Texas at Austin.

== Early career ==
While reporting for Investor's Business Daily in 1999, Sperry was banned from attending future White House social events after he was involved in a heated 10-minute exchange with Bill Clinton, Sperry asking when the president would hold his next press conference. Sperry joined WorldNetDaily the following year, after having reported for Investor's Business Daily for over a decade.

== Writings ==
In his first book published in 2003, Crude Politics: How Bush's Oil Cronies Hijacked the War on Terrorism, Sperry investigated the links between the administration of George W. Bush and commercial oil companies. He concluded that these oil interests in many ways were the driving force behind the war on terror.

His 2005 book Infiltration: How Muslim Spies and Subversives Have Penetrated Washington argued that American Muslims were "covertly trying to infiltrate the U.S. government", and that Muslims "conceal their Islamist agendas to gain acceptance in Washington". In the book Muslim Mafia: Inside the Secret Underworld That's Conspiring to Islamize America in 2009, his co-author's son Chris Gaubatz worked undercover at the Council on American-Islamic Relations (CAIR) to expose the view that "outwardly benign Muslim organizations support violent jihad and undermine law enforcement—with the ultimate goal of 'eliminating and destroying' American society 'from within'," and "how Muslims have for years been secretly infiltrating American society, government, and culture, pretending to be peace-loving and patriotic, while supporting violent jihad and working to turn America into an Islamic state."

As a reporter, Sperry wrote numerous articles against Democratic politicians such as Barack Obama, Nancy Pelosi, Eric Holder, and Adam Schiff. He described Obama as the "defender-in-chief of Islam", and warned of an "Islamic fifth column" growing inside the United States. He has said that Obama was "'flooding' the United States with a 'huge surge' of Muslim immigrants." Sperry has also noted that "unbeknown to most Americans", Obama in order to try to mandate racial equality, was creating a "diversity police state" while "furiously mining data on their health, home loans, credit cards, places of work, neighborhoods, even how their kids are disciplined in school—all to document 'inequalities' between minorities and whites."

In 2020, former Attorney General Eric Holder told Sperry on Twitter to "shut the hell up" about federal prosecutor Molly Gaston's donations to former President Obama. In 2023, it was revealed in the Twitter Files that Democratic Rep. Adam Schiff had lobbied to get Sperry's Twitter account suspended over his reporting on a Trump whistleblower in 2020. Sperry's Twitter account was eventually suspended in 2021, and in 2022. Sperry told Brian Kilmeade on Fox News that he was exploring legal options against Schiff as a result.

Following the January 6 United States Capitol attack, Sperry was among the first to spread the conspiracy theory that antifa were inciting the violence, writing on Twitter in a widely retweeted post that a "former FBI agent" had informed him that "at least 1 ‘bus load’ of antifa thugs infiltrated peaceful Trump demonstrators." The tweet was then picked up by The Gateway Pundit.

== Bibliography ==
- Crude Politics: How Bush's Oil Cronies Hijacked the War on Terrorism. W Pub Group. 2003. ISBN 978-0785262718.
- Infiltration: How Muslim Spies and Subversives Have Penetrated Washington. Nelson Current. 2005. ISBN 978-1595550033.
- Muslim Mafia: Inside the Secret Underworld That's Conspiring to Islamize America. Co-authored with Gaubatz, P. David. WND Books. 2009. ISBN 978-1935071105.
- The Great American Bank Robbery: The Unauthorized Report About What Really Caused the Great Recession. Thomas Nelson. 2011. ISBN 978-1595552709.
