= Joseph Farah =

American conservative writer (born 1954)

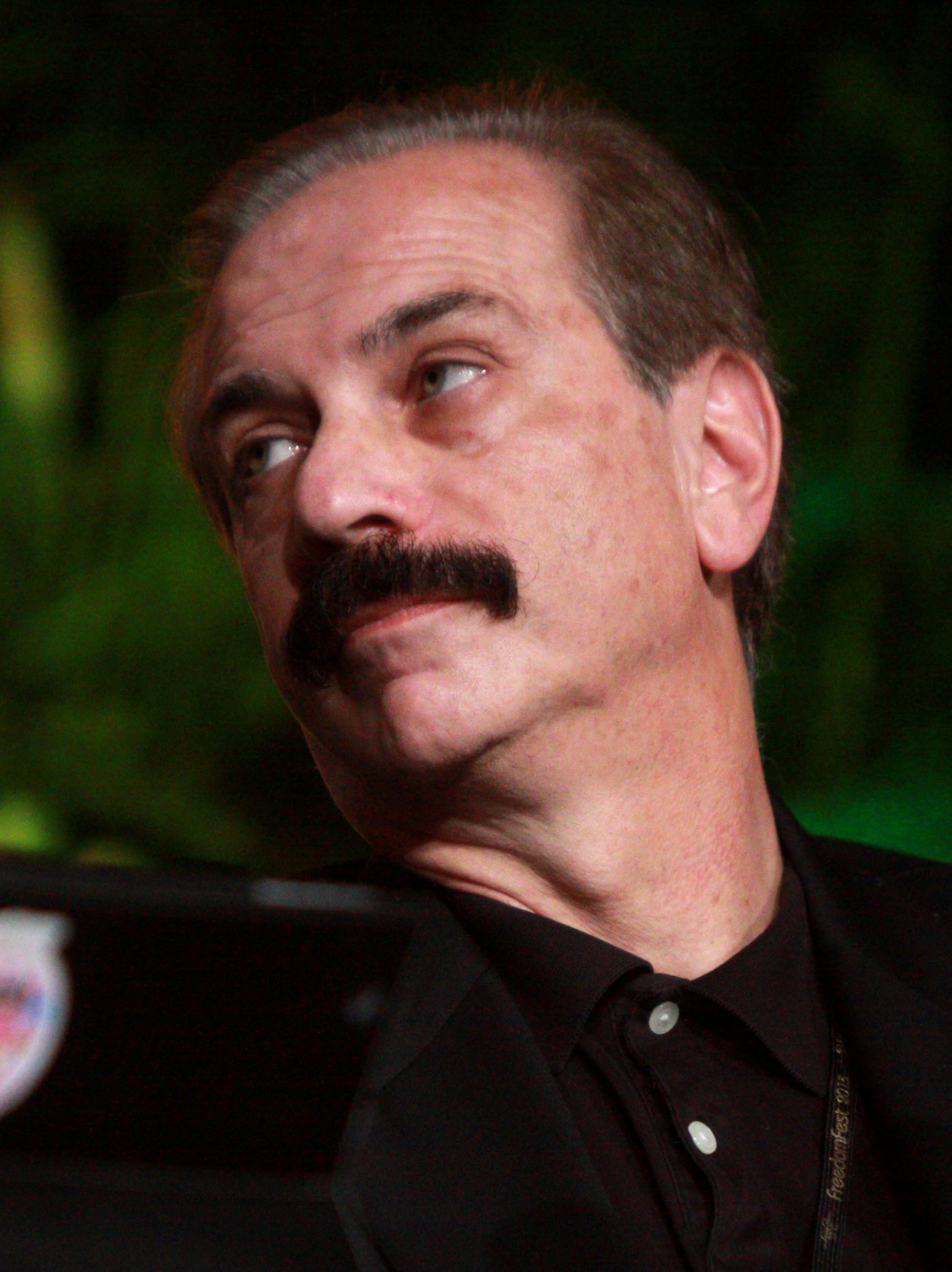
- Farah in 2013
- Born: Joseph Francis Farah; July 6, 1954 (age 72); Paterson, New Jersey, U.S.
- Education: William Paterson University (BA)
- Occupations: Journalist; author
- Spouse: Elizabeth Graham
- Children: 5, including Alyssa
- Writing career
- Notable awards: The Washington Times Foundation National Service Award (1996)

Joseph Francis Farah (born July 6, 1954) is an American author, journalist, and editor-in-chief of the far-right (Note: Sources describing WorldNetDaily as far-right: Balleck, Barry J. (June 1, 2018). "Farah, Joseph Francis". Modern American Extremism and Domestic Terrorism: An Encyclopedia of Extremists and Extremist Groups. ABC-CLIO. pp. 110–111. ISBN 9781440852756 – via Google Books. "Joseph Francis Farah (b. 1955) is editor in chief and CEO of WorldNetDaily (WND, About), a far-right "news" Web site he founded in 1997"; Strømmen, Hannah M. (October 30, 2024). "The War Bible". The Bibles of the Far Right. Oxford University Press. p. 152. ISBN 978-0-19-778989-6 – via Google Books. "Farah is the editor-in-chief of the far-right news website World Net Daily, which is cited several times in Breivik's manifesto."; Andersen, Robin (September 29, 2017). "Weaponizing Social Media: "The Alt-Right," the Election of Donald J. Trump, and the Rise of Ethno-Nationalism in the United States". In Andersen, Robin; de Silva, Purnaka L. (eds.). The Routledge Companion to Media and Humanitarian Action. New York: Routledge. pp. 490–491. doi:10.4324/9781315538129-49. ISBN 9781315538129 – via Taylor & Francis. "It started in January 2016 with an opinion piece Ulukaya wrote for CNN Money, about his efforts to motivate businesses to help end the refugee crisis. Though Ulukaya never mentioned Muslims, the piece attracted the far-right website World Net Daily that published a story titled, "American Yogurt Tycoon Vows to Choke U.S. With Muslims.""; Moffitt, Benjamin (February 2, 2023). "What Was the 'Alt' in Alt-Right, Alt-Lite, and Alt-Left? On 'Alt' as a Political Modifier". Political Studies. 72 (3). Sage: 903–923. doi:10.1177/00323217221150871. "Despite Trump's claim that there was no alt-left, within days, editor of the far-right site World Net Daily Joseph Farah published a column entitled 'Let's take a look at the Alt-Left'"; Massing, Michael (February 2009). "Un-American". Columbia Journalism Review. "Far-right Web sites like World Net Daily and Newsmax.com floated all kinds of specious stories about Obama that quickly careened around the blogosphere and onto talk radio."; Sullivan, Andrew (September 6, 2009). "Obama's in the ER but he'll get his reforms". The Sunday Times. ISSN 0956-1382. "One of the most popular far-right websites, WorldNetDaily"; Bruno, Debra; Bruno, Debra (February 21, 2016). "There's the major media. And then there's the 'other' White House press corps". The Washington Post. "Les Kinsolving, a reporter for the far-right World Net Daily, was a familiar White House gadfly from the days of the Nixon administration on."; Mackey, Robert (August 15, 2020). "White House Plants Pro-Trump Conspiracy Theorists Among Reporters in Briefing Room". The Intercept. "... Powe is a former blogger for WorldNetDaily, the far-right website that helped create the racist 'birther' conspiracy theory to undermine President Barack Obama."; Perry, Samuel (October 12, 2020). "Evangelical leaders like Billy Graham and Jerry Falwell Sr. have long talked of conspiracies against God's chosen – those ideas are finding resonance today". The Conversation. "WND is a far-right website that entered the mainstream during President Obama's presidency. The website was a hub for the birther conspiracy.") website WorldNetDaily (WND). Farah gained prominence for promoting conspiracy theories surrounding the suicide of Vince Foster and is a proponent of birtherism, a debunked conspiracy theory that Barack Obama is not a natural-born citizen of the United States.

== Early life ==
Joseph Francis Farah was born in Paterson, New Jersey, on July 6, 1954. His father was of Syrian and Lebanese ancestry and his mother was of French Canadian ancestry. His father was a schoolteacher. He graduated from William Paterson University, in Wayne, New Jersey with a B.A. in communications.

== Career ==
Farah worked for six years as executive news editor at the Los Angeles Herald Examiner until the paper shuttered in 1989.

On July 22, 1990, Farah became editor of The Sacramento Union. The paper had been losing up to $3 million annually, and in early 1990 it was purchased from Richard Mellon Scaife by Daniel Benvenuti Jr. and David Kassis. Farah and the paper's owners envisioned the paper as a conservative alternative to The Sacramento Bee. "We just thought the way to go was to be unabashedly conservative in our approach," explained Farah to The Washington Post. Among other things, Farah convinced Rush Limbaugh to write a daily column, which ran on "Page 1." Farah prohibited advertisement for films rated NC-17 in the newspaper.

In 1991, Farah left the Union and co-founded the Western Journalism Center. He writes a weekly print column for The Jerusalem Post which is nationally syndicated through Creators Syndicate.

He launched the online WorldNetDaily in 1997. The website has been categorized as far-right and is known for publishing unreliable or fringe material.

In April 2019, WorldNetDaily announced that Farah had suffered a stroke and would withdraw from the website's day-to-day operations until he recovers.

=== Promotion of conspiracy theories ===
Farah gained prominence for promoting conspiracy theories surrounding the suicide of Vince Foster.

Farah is a proponent of birtherism, the conspiracy theory related to President Barack Obama's status as a natural-born citizen of the United States and resultant eligibility to serve as U.S. president, stating, "It'll plague Obama throughout his presidency. It'll be a nagging issue and a sore on his administration, much like Monica Lewinsky was on Bill Clinton's presidency" and "It's not going to go away, and it will drive a wedge in an already divided public." Despite the release of President Obama's notarized birth certificate abstract, he continued to promote birtherism. Farah offered a $15,000 award for the release of the certificate, but did not pay the award after its release.

== Personal life ==
He is married to Elizabeth Graham and is a conservative evangelical Christian. He has five children, including Alyssa Farah Griffin, who served as the Press Secretary for Vice President Mike Pence and later served as Deputy Assistant to the Secretary of Defense for Media Affairs and Press Secretary for the Department of Defense.

== Books ==
- Collaborated with Rush Limbaugh on See, I Told You So (1994)
- Farah, Joseph; Richard Pombo (1996). This Land Is Our Land: How to End the War on Private Property. St. Martin's Press. ISBN 978-0-312-14747-1.
- Farah, Joseph (2005). Taking America Back: A Radical Plan to Revive Freedom, Morality, and Justice. WND Books. ISBN 978-1-58182-469-8.
- Farah, Joseph (2007). Stop the Presses!: The Inside Story of the New Media Revolution. WND Books. ISBN 978-1-58182-469-8.
- Farah, Joseph (2008). None of the Above: Why 2008 Is the Year to Cast the Ultimate Protest Vote. WND Books. ISBN 978-1-935071-01-3.
- Farah, Joseph (2010). The Tea Party Manifesto: A Vision for an American Rebirth. WND Books. ISBN 978-1-935071-28-0.
