= Muslim Mafia =

2009 book by Paul David Gaubatz and Paul Sperry

Muslim Mafia: Inside the Secret Underworld That's Conspiring to Islamize America
- Front cover
- Author: Paul David Gaubatz and Paul Sperry
- Cover artist: Linda Daly
- Language: English
- Subject: Islamic terrorism, Nonfiction
- Publisher: WND Books
- Publication date: October 15, 2009 (1st edition)
- Media type: Hardcover; electronic
- Pages: 448
- ISBN: 978-1-935071-10-5
- Dewey Decimal: 320.5/57
- LC Class: BP173.7 .G38 2009

Muslim Mafia: Inside the Secret Underworld That's Conspiring to Islamize America is a 2009 book by Paul David Gaubatz and Paul Sperry. According to the Charlotte Observer, it "portrays the Council on American-Islamic Relations (CAIR) as a subversive organization allied with international terrorists."

The book prompted endorsements from a number of conservative writers and requests by several conservative members of the United States Congress for investigations into CAIR's possible terrorist links and undue influence. It also prompted denouncements from CAIR, media outlets and other members of Congress. The manner in which its source documents were obtained led CAIR to sue one of the authors.

== Overview ==
The book is based on a six-month undercover investigation of the Washington-based CAIR by Chris Gaubatz—son of co-author Paul David Gaubatz—who posed as a convert to Islam. The book uses documents Chris Gaubatz obtained as a CAIR intern to support the book's assertions that CAIR is a front for the Muslim Brotherhood, and that CAIR supports international jihad against the U.S.

== Impact and reception ==
=== Political ===
With a foreword by U.S. Congresswoman Sue Myrick (Republican, North Carolina), the book attracted endorsements from three other Congressmen—Trent Franks (Republican, Arizona), John Shadegg (Republican, Arizona), and Paul Broun (Republican, Georgia)—as well as media attention beginning with its release in mid-October 2009.

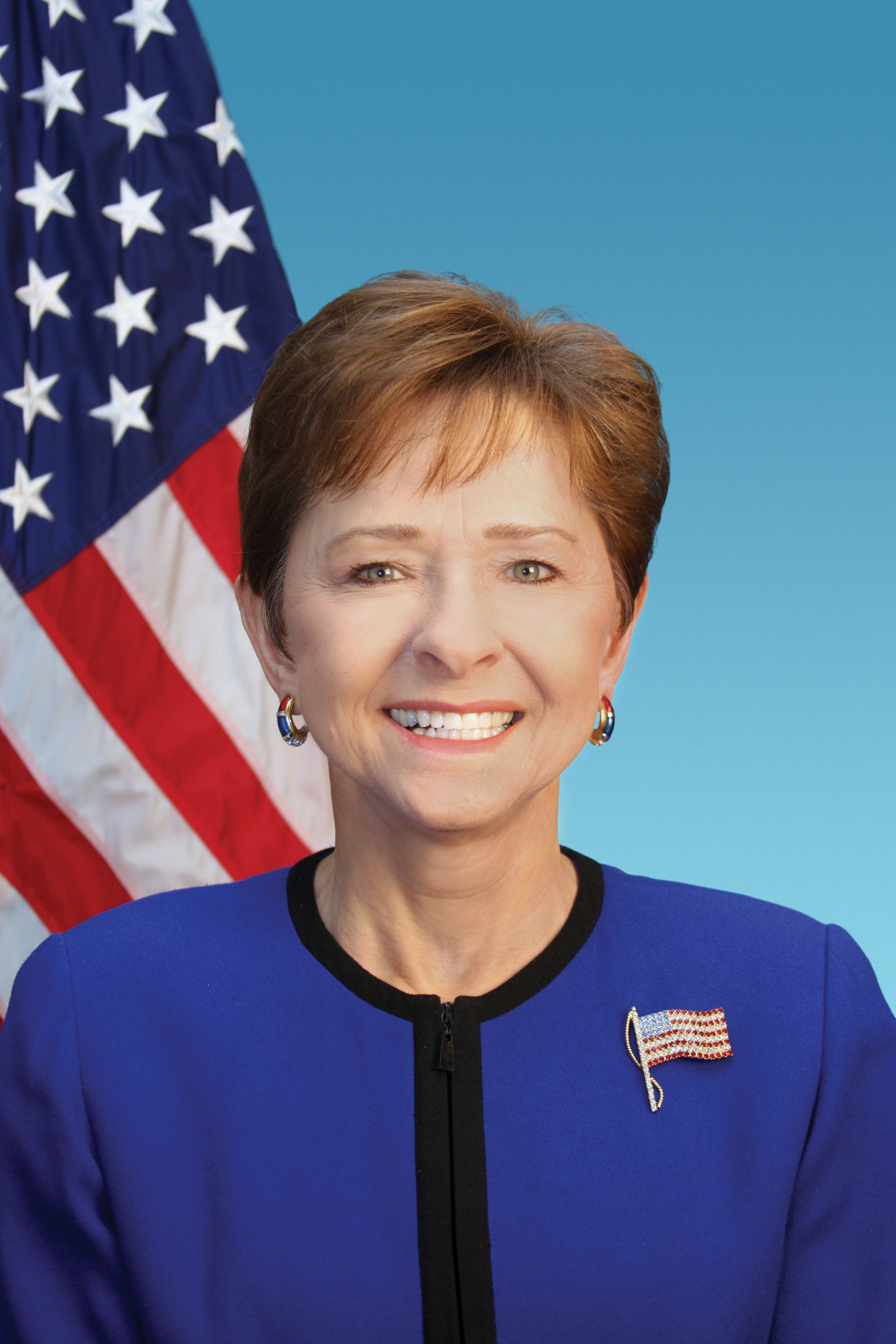
Congresswoman Sue Myrick, who wrote a foreword to Muslim Mafia

The four Congressmen then wrote Attorney General Eric Holder on October 21, 2009, saying that in light of the book's claims of CAIR attempting to influence national security policy within Congress, they were very concerned about CAIR's relationships with terrorist groups, and requesting that the United States Department of Justice (DOJ) provide each Congressman a summary of DOJ's evidence and findings that led DOJ to name CAIR an unindicted co-conspirator in the Holy Land Foundation terrorism trial.

Congresswoman Loretta Sanchez (Democrat, California), "appalled" by the situation created by the book and the four Republican endorsements, said "I urge the rest of my colleagues to join me in denouncing this witch hunt, which is clearly intended to create fear and distrust in our Capitol Hill community." The book and its endorsement from the four Congressmen were denounced on the House floor by Congressman Keith Ellison (Democrat, Minnesota), the first Muslim elected to the U.S. Congress, in a speech that included a statement by the House's Tri-Caucus (consisting of about 87 House members), officially entered into the Congressional Record and broadcast on C-SPAN on October 26, 2009.

The four Republican Congressmen, joined by Senator Tom Coburn (Republican, Oklahoma) and Congressman Patrick McHenry (Republican, North Carolina), then wrote IRS Commissioner Douglas H. Shulman on November 16, 2009, asking that CAIR be investigated for excessive lobbying and failing to register as a lobbying organization.

=== Media ===
In the wake of the Fort Hood shooting, the book received an editorial endorsement from former Congressman Tom Tancredo (Republican, Colorado), writing in the November 6 edition of The Denver Post.

Arab-American comedian Dean Obeidallah poked fun at the book, writing on October 14, 2009, in The Huffington Post that "a 'Muslim Mafia' does sound cool on some level. Americans love mafia shows, so this 'Muslim Mafia' could inspire the first show on US TV to star Muslims. Or maybe I like the term 'Muslim Mafia' so much because my father is Muslim and my mom is Sicilian. With this pedigree, I'm a shoe-in [sic] for a top position in the 'Muslim Mafia.'" A highly critical opinion piece in Dubai's Khaleej Times opined that the book's "attack" on Muslim congressional interns and CAIR was "probably more politically significant" than the Fort Hood shooting." Bahrain's Gulf Daily News called the book "extremely biased". The TPMMuckraker also reported on the book and its reception, quoting Suhail Khan, the Fellow for Muslim-Christian Understanding at the Institute for Global Engagement, as saying: "Some perfectly well-meaning members—Myrick, Shadegg, Broun, and Franks, who I've met and are good people—have been really duped by this Gaubatz character."

== Litigation ==
In November 2009 the book received further attention when federal judge Colleen Kollar-Kotelly ordered several of the book's source documents removed from Gaubatz's website, after CAIR brought a federal civil lawsuit against Gaubatz and his son (who had obtained the documents as a CAIR intern) for stealing the documents. U.S. District Judge Colleen Kollar-Kotelly concluded that the Gaubatzs "unlawfully obtained access to, and have already caused repeated public disclosure of, material containing CAIR's proprietary, confidential and privileged information," which CAIR says included names, addresses, telephone numbers and e-mail addresses of CAIR employees and donors. As a result, the judge ordered Gaubatz to remove certain documents from his website. Judge Kollar-Kotelly also said that CAIR's employees reported a dramatic increase in the number of threats by email, letter, or phone by since the release of Gaubatz's book.

Gaubatz agreed in early November to return more than 12,000 pages of CAIR records while the judge considered the lawsuit, but in late November before he could do so the U.S. Government, which previously had no role in the lawsuit, filed a sealed motion in the case and agents from the FBI served the Gaubatzes' attorneys with a grand jury subpoena demanding the records.

Other media sources carrying commentary on the book included Politico, which reported on CAIR's lawsuit against the Gaubatzs, noting: "In an interesting twist, despite the book's harsh claims that CAIR is part of a 'jihadist network,' the suit does not allege libel or defamation".

== First publication ==
- Muslim Mafia: Inside the Secret Underworld that's Conspiring to Islamize America, P. David Gaubatz and Paul Sperry, WND Books, October 15, 2009, 448 pages, ISBN 1-935071-10-6, ISBN 978-1-935071-10-5 (HC).
