= Shields Library =

Coordinates: 38°32′23″N 121°44′57″W

The Peter J. Shields Library, or Shields Library, is a four-story library named after Peter J. Shields. It is located in the eastern part of main campus of UC Davis in unincorporated Yolo County, adjacent to Davis. The library is an essential study and resource location for UCD students, as well as for many UC Davis alumni.

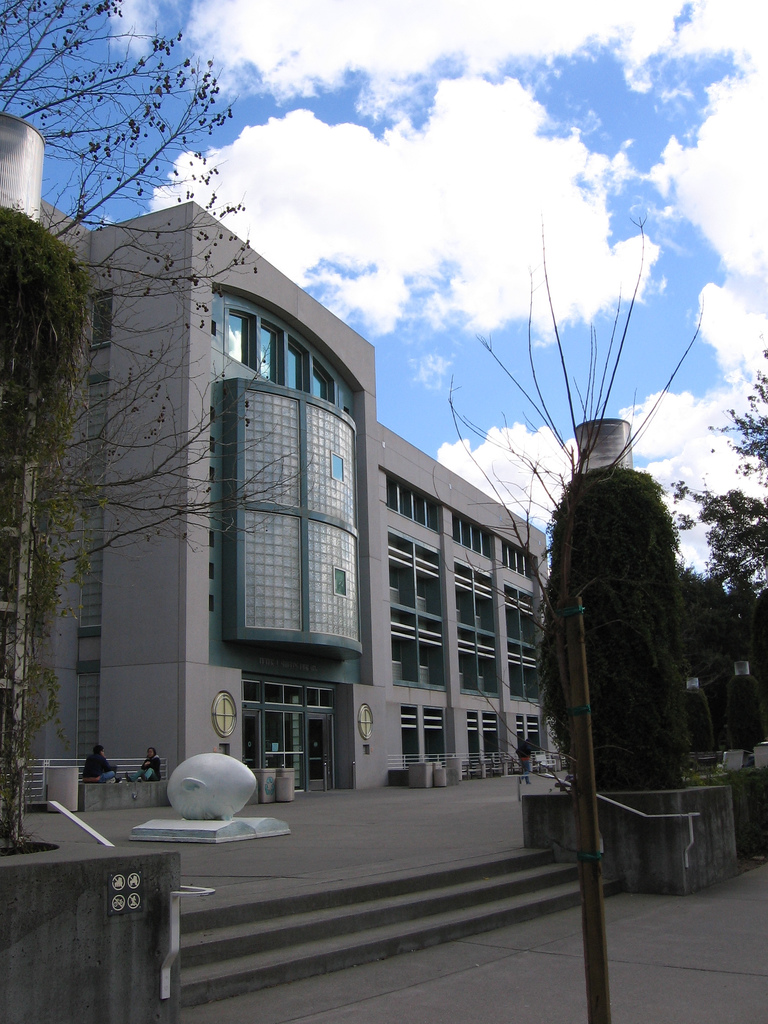
The exterior of the Peter J. Shields Library

== History ==
The rectangular building the large library occupies was built in three parts starting in the year 1940, when the oldest north wing was built. The main entrance used to face north towards the Quad (the large rectangular grassy field which was the historic geographic center of campus). When UC Davis shut down during World War II, the main reading room was used to train the Army Signal Corps. Expansion of the library (stage two) began about 15 years later in the 1960s, which added the south and east sides of the building. The front entrance also changed its orientation from facing north to facing east. The last expansion stage, which opened spring quarter of 1990, added the western side of the library and once again moved the main entrance to the west. This orientation remains the same as of now.

== The interior ==
The library contains 3.2 million volumes, making it the largest library in Yolo County and the third largest in the University of California system. In addition to books, the Shields Library contains many study tables, computers, and pieces of art work scattered across the interior of the library.

Shields Library includes four individual departments: Biological Agricultural Science, Humanities, Social Sciences & Government Information Services, Special Collections, and Library Instruction.

The Shields Library contains the Franklin Templeton Bloomberg Lab, the location of the campus's Bloomberg terminals.

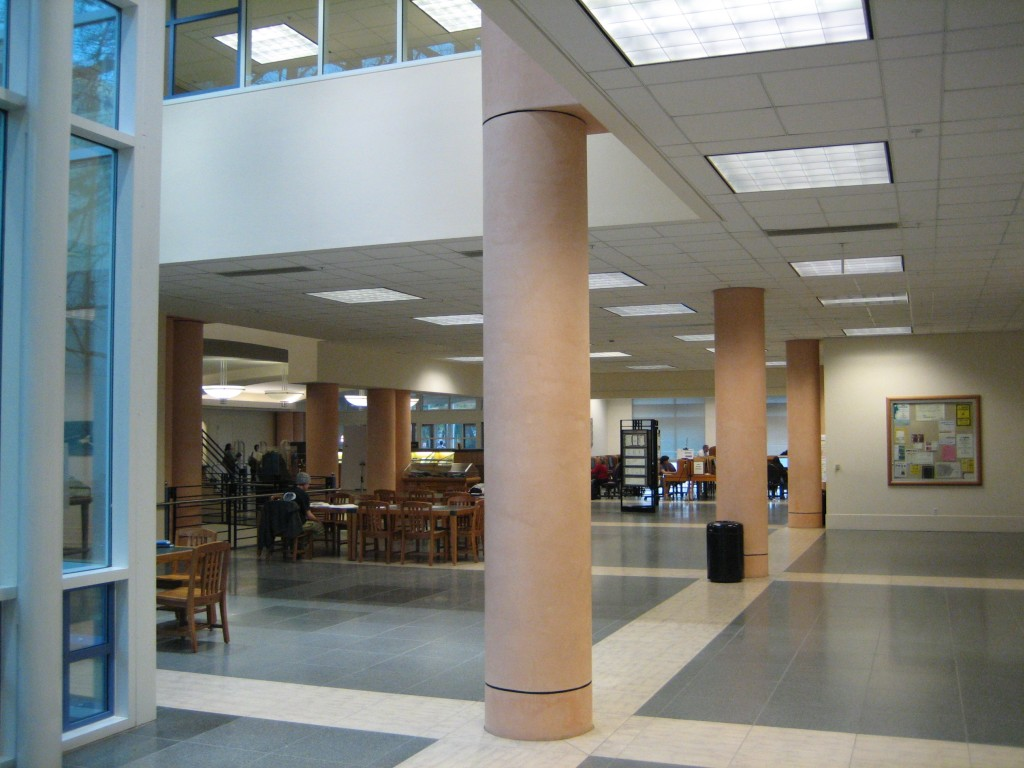
Inside of the Peter J. Shields Library
