= WorldNetDaily =

American far-right fake news website

- Website type: Far-right politics; Fake news
- Available in: English
- Founded: 1997; 29 years ago
- Owners: WorldNetDaily.com, Inc.
- Founder: Joseph Farah
- Editor: Joseph Farah
- Website: www.wnd.com

WND (an initialism of its original name, WorldNetDaily) is an American far-right news and opinion website. It is known for promoting fake news and conspiracy theories, including the false claim that former President Barack Obama was born outside the United States.

The site was founded in May 1997 by Joseph Farah, who is its current editor-in-chief and CEO. The website publishes news, editorials, and opinion columns, while also aggregating content from other publications.

== History ==
In 1997, Joseph Farah created the news website WorldNetDaily as a division of the Western Journalism Center. It was subsequently spun off in 1999 as a for-profit organization with the backing of $4.5 million from investors, Farah owning a majority of the stock. The site describes itself as "an independent news company dedicated to uncompromising journalism". In 1999, WorldNetDaily.com, Inc. was incorporated in Delaware with offices in Cave Junction, Oregon.

The website gained notoriety for stoking false "birther" conspiracy theories about President Barack Obama.

In 2018, Farah wrote about WorldNetDaily's financial problems, saying it faced an "existential threat". Farah ceased contributing to the site after his March 12, 2019, column; the site announced a few weeks later that he had suffered a major stroke. In April 2019, The Washington Post reported that WorldNetDaily suffered from declining revenue and diminishing readership. Farah blamed the website's financial woes on what he claimed was suppression by powerful technology companies.

In 2019, WorldNetDaily created the WND News Center, a nonprofit organization where its reporting operation would move. The structure is similar to that used by another conservative news website, The Daily Caller.

=== Application for congressional press credentials (2002) ===
Seeking credentials to cover the United States Congress in 2002, WND was opposed by the Standing Committee of Correspondents. This panel of journalists is charged by Congress with administering press credentials. Until 1996, Internet-only publications had been deemed unacceptable. WND turned to the United States Senate Committee on Rules and Administration for help, arguing that the panel's decision had violated the site's constitutional rights to due process, equal protection, and freedom of the press. Faced "with legal threats and negative publicity, the panel reversed itself, voting 3–2 to award WND its credentials". Shortly after, the rules were formally adjusted to clarify the participation of online publications.

=== Ann Coulter speech at Homocon (2010) ===
In 2010, when Ann Coulter accepted an invitation to attend and speak at GOProud's Homocon 2010 convention, Farah announced the withdrawal of Coulter's name from the list of speakers at the company's 'Taking America Back' conference. Coulter responded by saying that speaking engagements do not imply endorsement of the hosting organization.

== Content ==
WND provides news, editorials, letters to the editor, forums, videos and conducts a daily poll. Its CEO Joseph Farah has said that WND provides "the broadest spectrum of opinion anywhere in the news business", but acknowledges "some misinformation by columnists". WND's content is predominantly conservative. Besides providing articles written by its own staff, the site links to news from other publications.

WND's political lean has been described as alt-right and far-right. (Note: Sources describing WorldNetDaily as far-right: Strømmen, Hannah M. (October 30, 2024). "The War Bible". The Bibles of the Far Right. Oxford University Press. p. 152. ISBN 978-0-19-778989-6 – via Google Books. "Farah is the editor-in-chief of the far-right news website World Net Daily, which is cited several times in Breivik's manifesto."; Andersen, Robin (September 29, 2017). "Weaponizing Social Media: "The Alt-Right," the Election of Donald J. Trump, and the Rise of Ethno-Nationalism in the United States". In Andersen, Robin; de Silva, Purnaka L. (eds.). The Routledge Companion to Media and Humanitarian Action. New York: Routledge. pp. 490–491. doi:10.4324/9781315538129-49. ISBN 9781315538129 – via Taylor & Francis. "It started in January 2016 with an opinion piece Ulukaya wrote for CNN Money, about his efforts to motivate businesses to help end the refugee crisis. Though Ulukaya never mentioned Muslims, the piece attracted the far-right website World Net Daily that published a story titled, "American Yogurt Tycoon Vows to Choke U.S. With Muslims.""; Moffitt, Benjamin (February 2, 2023). "What Was the 'Alt' in Alt-Right, Alt-Lite, and Alt-Left? On 'Alt' as a Political Modifier". Political Studies. 72 (3). Sage: 903–923. doi:10.1177/00323217221150871. "Despite Trump's claim that there was no alt-left, within days, editor of the far-right site World Net Daily Joseph Farah published a column entitled 'Let's take a look at the Alt-Left'"; Massing, Michael (February 2009). "Un-American". Columbia Journalism Review. "Far-right Web sites like World Net Daily and Newsmax.com floated all kinds of specious stories about Obama that quickly careened around the blogosphere and onto talk radio."; Sullivan, Andrew (September 6, 2009). "Obama's in the ER but he'll get his reforms". The Sunday Times. ISSN 0956-1382. "One of the most popular far-right websites, WorldNetDaily"; Bruno, Debra; Bruno, Debra (February 21, 2016). "There's the major media. And then there's the 'other' White House press corps". The Washington Post. "Les Kinsolving, a reporter for the far-right World Net Daily, was a familiar White House gadfly from the days of the Nixon administration on."; Mackey, Robert (August 15, 2020). "White House Plants Pro-Trump Conspiracy Theorists Among Reporters in Briefing Room". The Intercept. "... Powe is a former blogger for WorldNetDaily, the far-right website that helped create the racist 'birther' conspiracy theory to undermine President Barack Obama."; Perry, Samuel (October 12, 2020). "Evangelical leaders like Billy Graham and Jerry Falwell Sr. have long talked of conspiracies against God's chosen – those ideas are finding resonance today". The Conversation. "WND is a far-right website that entered the mainstream during President Obama's presidency. The website was a hub for the birther conspiracy.") WND is known for promoting fake news (Note: Sources describing WorldNetDaily as a fake news website: Grinberg, Nir; Joseph, Kenneth; Friedland, Lisa; Swire-Thompson, Briony; Lazer, David (January 25, 2019). "Fake news on Twitter during the 2016 U.S. presidential election". Science. 363 (6425): 374–378. Bibcode:2019Sci...363..374G. doi:10.1126/science.aau2706. ISSN 0036-8075. PMID 30679368. S2CID 59248491.; Guess, Andrew M.; Nyhan, Brendan; Reifler, Jason (March 2, 2020). "Exposure to untrustworthy websites in the 2016 US election". Nature Human Behaviour. 4 (5): 472–480. doi:10.1038/s41562-020-0833-x. hdl:10871/121820. ISSN 2397-3374. PMC 7239673. PMID 32123342.; Ognyanova, Katherine; Lazer, David; Robertson, Ronald E.; Wilson, Christo (June 2, 2020). "Misinformation in action: Fake news exposure is linked to lower trust in media, higher trust in government when your side is in power". Harvard Kennedy School Misinformation Review. doi:10.37016/mr-2020-024. S2CID 219904597.; Owen, Laura Hazard (October 26, 2020). "Older people and Republicans are most likely to share Covid-19 stories from fake news sites on Twitter". Nieman Lab.; Guess, Andrew; Aslett, Kevin; Tucker, Joshua; Bonneau, Richard; Nagler, Jonathan (April 26, 2021). "Cracking Open the News Feed: Exploring What U.S. Facebook Users See and Share with Large-Scale Platform Data". Journal of Quantitative Description: Digital Media. 1: 1–48. doi:10.51685/jqd.2021.006. ISSN 2673-8813.; Osmundsen, Mathias; Bor, Alexander; Vahlstrup, Peter Bjerregaard; Bechmann, Anja; Petersen, Michael Bang (May 7, 2021). "Partisan Polarization Is the Primary Psychological Motivation behind Political Fake News Sharing on Twitter". American Political Science Review. 115 (3): 999–1015. doi:10.1017/S0003055421000290. ISSN 0003-0554. S2CID 235527523.; Kukura, Joe (March 16, 2017). "The Inside Dope on Jean Quan's Pot Club". SF Weekly. "As of press time, the homepage of their website lists links to right-wing fake news sites like WorldNetDaily..."; Aly, Ahmad (December 23, 2023). "Three Fake News Websites Spread Propaganda During the War on Gaza". Misbar.) and conspiracy theories, (Note: Sources describing WorldNetDaily's publication of conspiracy theories: Foley, Jordan M. (September 13, 2020). "Press Credentials and Hybrid Boundary Zones: The Case of WorldNetDaily and the Standing Committee of Correspondents" (PDF). Journalism Practice. 14 (8): 9–10. doi:10.1080/17512786.2019.1671214. ISSN 1751-2794. S2CID 210645440 – via jordanfoley.net.; Bruno, Debra; Bruno, Debra (February 21, 2016). "There's the major media. And then there's the 'other' White House press corps". The Washington Post. "Les Kinsolving, a reporter for the far-right World Net Daily, was a familiar White House gadfly from the days of the Nixon administration on."; Massing, Michael (February 2009). "Un-American". Columbia Journalism Review. "Far-right Web sites like World Net Daily and Newsmax.com floated all kinds of specious stories about Obama that quickly careened around the blogosphere and onto talk radio."; O'Donnell, S. Jonathon (August 10, 2016). "Secularizing Demons: Fundamentalist Navigations in Religion and Secularity: with Sebastian Musch, 'The Atomic Priesthood and Nuclear Waste Management: Religion, Sci-Fi Literature, and the End of Our Civilization'; S. Jonathon" (PDF). Zygon. 51 (3): 640–660. doi:10.1111/zygo.12275. ISSN 0591-2385. "While such oddities might cast Horn as marginal, he has been featured heavily on popular right-wing conspiracist website WorldNetDaily (wnd.com)"; Burns, John F. (May 5, 2009). "Britain Identifies 16 Barred From Entering U.K.". The New York Times. "according to WorldNetDaily.com, a conservative Web site."; "Fact-checking President-elect Trump's news conference". The Washington Post. "He frequently claimed that Obama had spent $2 million to cover this up — a number he plucked out of World Net Daily, which promotes conservative-leaning conspiracy theories."; Borchers, Callum (August 12, 2016). "The highly reliable, definitely-not-crazy places where Donald Trump gets his news". The Washington Post. "WND is a leader in preserving murder cover-up theories, publishing 'exclusive reports' linking the Clintons to a plot to kill their longtime friend."; Krieg, Gregory (October 28, 2016). "Trump's supporters and their bloody words of war". CNN. "Writing in the right-wing site WorldNetDaily, Pat Buchanan...") including the white genocide conspiracy theory and the false claim that former President Barack Obama was not born in the United States. (Note: Sources describing WorldNetDaily's promotion of Barack Obama citizenship conspiracy theories: Roig-Franzia, Manuel (April 2, 2019). "Inside the spectacular fall of the granddaddy of right-wing conspiracy sites". The Washington Post.; Massing, Michael (February 2009). "Un-American". Columbia Journalism Review. "Far-right Web sites like World Net Daily and Newsmax.com floated all kinds of specious stories about Obama that quickly careened around the blogosphere and onto talk radio."; Mackey, Robert (August 15, 2020). "White House Plants Pro-Trump Conspiracy Theorists Among Reporters in Briefing Room". The Intercept. "... Powe is a former blogger for WorldNetDaily, the far-right website that helped create the racist "birther" conspiracy theory to undermine President Barack Obama."; Perry, Samuel (October 12, 2020). "Evangelical leaders like Billy Graham and Jerry Falwell Sr. have long talked of conspiracies against God's chosen – those ideas are finding resonance today". The Conversation. "WND is a far-right website that entered the mainstream during President Obama's presidency. The website was a hub for the birther conspiracy.") The Southern Poverty Law Center (SPLC) labels WND an anti-government extremist group.

=== Anthony C. LoBaido commentary on September 11 attacks (2001) ===
On September 13, 2001, WND published an opinion article by Anthony C. LoBaido regarding the September 11 attacks on New York City and Washington, D.C., that had occurred two days earlier. In his column, LoBaido described what he said was the moral depravity of America in general and New York in particular, asking whether "God (has) raised up Shiite Islam as a sword against America". Commentators Virginia Postrel of Reason magazine and James Taranto of The Wall Street Journal criticized LoBaido and Joseph Farah for the piece and called for columnists Hugh Hewitt and Bill O'Reilly to sever their ties with WND. Founder Farah responded with his own column, saying that LoBaido's opinion piece did not reflect the viewpoint of WND, and that it, like most other commentary pieces, had not been reviewed before publication.

=== Journal of Homosexuality article (2005) ===
In 2005, WorldNetDaily published a piece denouncing an article titled Pederasty: an integration of empirical, historical, sociological, Cross-Cultural, Cross-species, and evolutionary Perspectives, which was authored by Bruce Rind and set to be published in a special issue of then Haworth Press's Journal of Homosexuality. The managing director of WorldNetDaily, David Kupelian, accused Rind of advocating for pederasty and pointed to his previous research to say that advocacy for sex between adults and minors would be the next step for the "sexual liberation" movement. Ultimately, the pressure arising from the website culminated with the cancellation of the article's publication by Haworth Press in September of the same year.

=== Barack Obama citizenship conspiracy theories ===
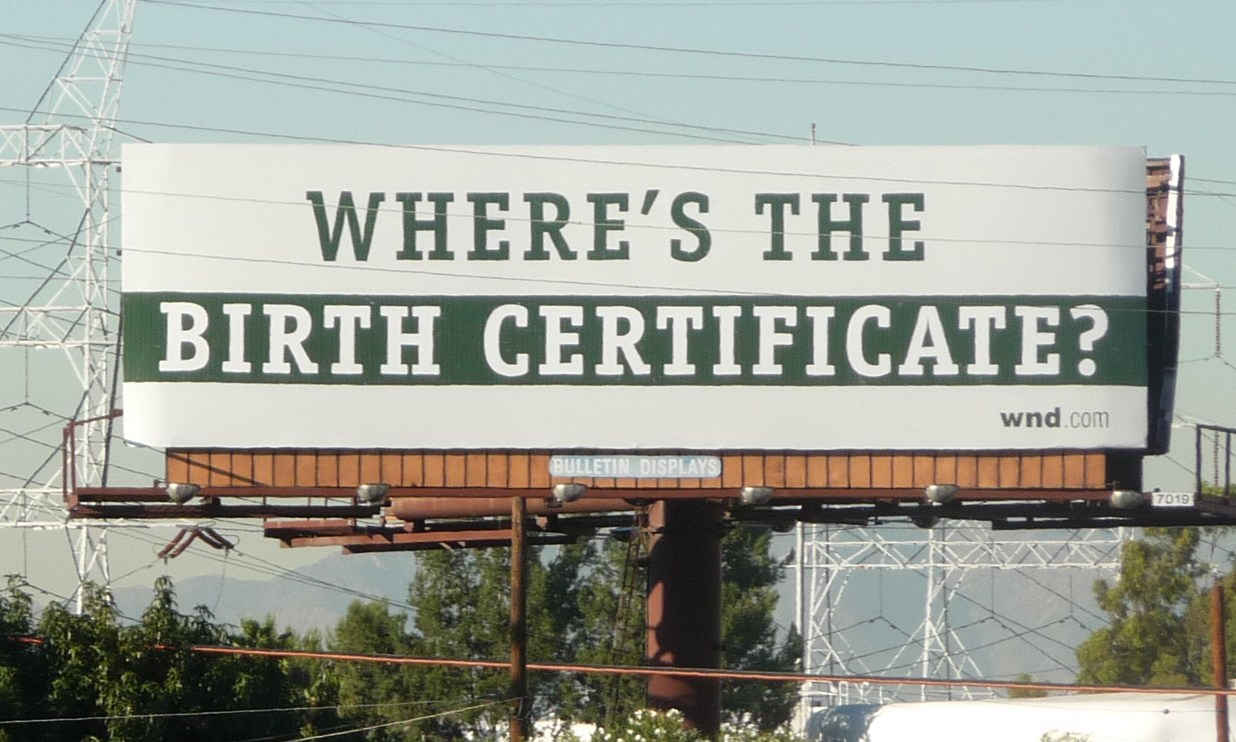
A 2010 billboard displayed in South Gate, California, questioning the validity of Barack Obama's birth certificate and by extension his citizenship and eligibility to serve as President of the U.S. The billboard was part of an advertising campaign by WorldNetDaily, whose URL appears on the billboard's bottom right corner.

WND has published hundreds of articles promoting "birther" conspiracy theories about President Barack Obama's U.S. citizenship, for which it has gained notoriety. It has falsely claimed that Obama is not a natural-born U.S. citizen and thus is not eligible to serve as president. After the 2008 presidential campaign, WND began an online petition to have Obama's Hawaiian birth certificate released to the public and Farah offered a $15,000 award for its release. The website also unsuccessfully urged Supreme Court justices to hear several lawsuits aiming to release Obama's birth certificate. The White House released copies of the president's original long-form birth certificate on April 27, 2011. After the long-form birth certificate was released, Farah refused to pay the promised award and WND continued to promote its conspiracy theory, publishing an article questioning the certificate's authenticity.

=== Advertisement featuring Neil Patrick Harris (2013) ===
In January 2013, a WorldNetDaily article criticized a Super Bowl XLVII advertisement in which Neil Patrick Harris wore eye black with "Feb 3 2013" written on it. The website accused Harris of "mocking Christianity". Quarterback Tim Tebow was known for inscribing Bible verses with eye black to wear during NFL games. A similar advertisement by Beyoncé for the Super Bowl had not been criticized. In a later Twitter post by Harris about the Super Bowl, he used the hashtag "#noagenda".

=== Russian interference in US politics ===
On August 7, 2017, WorldNetDaily published "The 8 Dirtiest Scandals of Robert Mueller No One Is Talking About", which was pushed out by Elena Khusyaynova's operation, targeting the Mueller investigation.

=== COVID-19 misinformation ===
In April 2020, the SPLC reported that WND "has boosted a number of articles featuring antisemitic dog whistles, fake cures and other disinformation" about COVID-19, with headlines such as "Coronavirus is being weaponized by Soros, others behind anti-Trump ads", "Clyburn: Democrats must use Chinese virus to restructure America 'to fit our vision'" and "Newt Gingrich's question for Biden exposes Obama's undeniable role in N95 mask shortage". Another headline proclaimed that a three-drug cocktail promoted by Vladimir Zelenko had a "100% success" rate in treating 350 COVID-19 patients.

A 2020 study by researchers from Northeastern, Harvard, Northwestern and Rutgers universities found that WND was among the top 5 most shared fake news domains in tweets related to COVID-19, the others being The Gateway Pundit, InfoWars, Judicial Watch and Natural News.

== Products ==
WND publishes books under the imprint WND Books. The imprint was launched in 2002. WND's imprint publishing partner was Christian publishing house Thomas Nelson Publishers (2002–2004). Cumberland House Publishing (2004–2007), and conservative publisher World Ahead Publishing (2007). In 2008, WND acquired World Ahead Media.

WND Books has published books written by right-wing politicians and pundits such as Katherine Harris, former Secretary of State of Florida in office in 2000 during the presidential election under Governor Jeb Bush; commentator Michael Savage; conspiracy theorist Jerome Corsi; ex-congressman Tom Tancredo; and former Ohio Secretary of State Ken Blackwell. In October 2009, WND Books published Muslim Mafia: Inside the Secret Underworld That's Conspiring to Islamize America by Paul David Gaubatz and Paul Sperry. In April 2011, Paul Harris, writing for The Guardian, described WND Books as "a niche producer of rightwing conspiracy theories, religious books and 'family values' tracts".

WND also publishes a printed magazine, Whistleblower. It operates other companies such as the G2 Bulletin, a subscription-only website described as an "intelligence resource" for "insights into geo-political and geo-strategic developments".

The WND website also sells survivalist gear.

== Reception ==
The SPLC has accused WND of "peddling white nationalism", due to its publication of a series of articles on "black mob violence" by writer Colin Flaherty. It accused the website of being a source of "anti-government conspiracy theories, gay-bashing, anti-Muslim propaganda, and End Times prophecy".

== Litigation ==
=== Clark Jones libel lawsuit (2000–2008) ===
On September 20, 2000, WND published an article saying that Clark Jones, a Savannah, Tennessee car dealer, a fund-raiser for then-Vice President Al Gore in his presidential campaign, had interfered with a criminal investigation, had been a "subject" of a criminal investigation, and was listed on law enforcement computers as a "dope dealer". It implied that he had ties to others involved in alleged criminal activity. The authors later put forward the theory that the publication of this article, as well as other WND articles that were critical of Gore, contributed significantly to Gore losing his home state of Tennessee that November.

In 2001, Clark Jones filed a lawsuit against WND; the reporters, Charles C. Thompson II and Tony Hays; the Center for Public Integrity, which had underwritten Thompson and Hays' reporting on the article and related ones; and various Tennessee publications and broadcasters whom he accused of repeating the claim, arguing these entities had committed libel and defamation. The lawsuit was scheduled to go to trial in March 2008; but, on February 13, 2008, WND announced that a confidential out-of-court settlement had been reached with Jones. A settlement statement jointly drafted by all parties in the lawsuit stated that a Freedom of Information Act request showed that the allegations had been false, and that WND had misquoted sources.

== Staff ==
Notable staff members include Jerusalem Bureau Chief Aaron Klein, former White House correspondent Lester Kinsolving, Ohio State Senate Senior Press Secretary Garth Kant, and staff writer Jerome Corsi. Its commentary pages feature editorials by the site's founder Joseph Farah, as well as by commentators including 2016 Republican presidential candidate Ben Carson, Pat Buchanan, Ann Coulter, David Limbaugh, Chuck Norris, Walter E. Williams, Ilana Mercer, Bill Press, and Nat Hentoff.

In February 2020, Right Wing Watch reported that Michael J. Thompson, who worked in WND's marketing department, had also worked at white nationalist publications such as VDARE and American Renaissance under the pseudonym of "Paul Kersey". It found that his position at WND allowed him to move in professional circles that included white nationalists, writers at Breitbart News and The Daily Caller, and prominent Trump supporters such as Steve Bannon and Jack Posobiec.

== See also ==
- List of fake news websites
