= Western Journalism Center =

American conservative advocacy group

The Western Journalism Center (also called the Western Center for Journalism) was founded in 1991 by Joseph Farah and James H. Smith. Based in Sacramento, California. The center produces a conservative newsletter.

== Projects ==
The Center helped fund Christopher W. Ruddy (who later founded NewsMax) to investigate conspiracies surrounding the death of Vincent Foster, which was part of the Arkansas Project. Eventually, "the Center placed some 50 ads reprinting Ruddy's Pittsburgh Tribune-Review stories in the Washington Times, then repackaged the articles as a packet titled "The Ruddy Investigation," which sold for $12." In addition, "Farah also bought full page ads publicizing Ruddy's allegations that appeared in papers including The New York Times, Washington Post, Chicago Tribune, and Los Angeles Times" and "the ad campaign brought in over $500,000, half from individual donors-many of whom bought Foster conspiracy materials-and half from foundations, including $100,000 from Carthage." The Carthage Foundation is controlled by Richard Mellon Scaife, whose foundations gave $330,000 to the Center in 1994 and 1995. Later, "WJC circulated a video featuring Ruddy's claims, Unanswered-The Death of Vincent Foster, that was produced by author James Davidson, chairman of the National Taxpayers Union (NTU) and co-editor of the Strategic Investment newsletter."

In 1997 Joseph Farah created the news website WorldNetDaily as a division of the Western Journalism Center. It was subsequently spun off in 1999 as a for-profit organization.

== IRS Lawsuit ==
In 1996, the Internal Revenue Service (IRS) audited the center. According to Farah, after announcing the audit IRS agents inquired as to why the center was investigating the death of Clinton deputy White House counsel Vince Foster. And that on their first visit an IRS field agent named Thomas Cederquist explained that the audit was a 'political case.' The audit found the center to be in total compliance with the law.

In 1998, with the help of Judicial Watch the Center sued the IRS claiming it was audited in 1996 for political reasons. The lawsuit was thrown out, with appeals denied. A lower court ruled that the IRS could not be sued on allegations of politically motivated auditing practices, while a federal appeals court ruled that the center's lawsuit was barred by the statute of limitations.
