= Alfred Holman =

American journalist

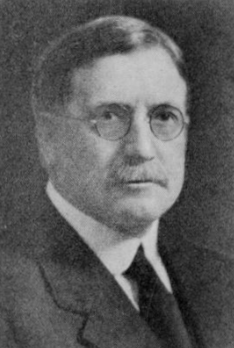
- Born: July 6, 1857; Yamhill County, Oregon, US
- Died: December 14, 1930 (aged 73); Bolinas, California, US
- Occupations: Newspaper owner, editor

Alfred H. Holman (1857–1930) was a prominent newspaper owner and editor in the western United States in the late 19th and early 20th centuries.

== Biography ==
Both of Alfred Holman's grandfathers were pioneers of the Oregon Country, settling in Yamhill County in the 1840s. Holman was born there on July 6, 1857. He was hired by The Oregonian in 1869-70, and he was associated with that newspaper's editor, Harvey W. Scott, for 40 years hence. He published an obituary for Scott in the Oregon Historical Quarterly in 1913. Holman had one daughter, Helen. Oregon Supreme Court justice Thomas A. McBride was his uncle.

Holman worked as a newspaper editor in Seattle, San Jose, and Sacramento prior to purchasing The Argonaut, a highly regarded San Francisco newspaper, in 1907. He served as the Argonaut's editor until he sold it in 1924. With several associates, he purchased the San Francisco Bulletin that year. He edited the Bulletin and the Oakland Tribune prior to his death in 1930. He served on the advisory board of the Columbia School of Journalism in New York, and on in that capacity made recommendations for the Pulitzer Prize. He wrote a number of articles for the New York Times in the 1920s as that newspaper's "Pacific States correspondent."

Prosecutor Francis J. Heney singled out Holman and the Argonaut in 1908 in his criticism of San Francisco newspapers in the context of the Oregon land fraud trials. Heney charged that Holman compromised his reporting in order to protect the wealthy.

Holman served on the committee for the 1915 Panama Pacific Exposition.

Holman was invited in 1918 by the British Government to join an American delegation to view the World War I front. The delegation witnessed the "probable destruction" of a German U-boat by an American warship. He described his visit to Paris in an Argonaut column that was republished in his native Yamhill County. In 1922 Holman was offered a position as minister to Greece in the Warren G. Harding administration.

Holman died of a heart attack while visiting Bolinas, California on December 14, 1930.
