= Emma Frances Dawson =

American poet

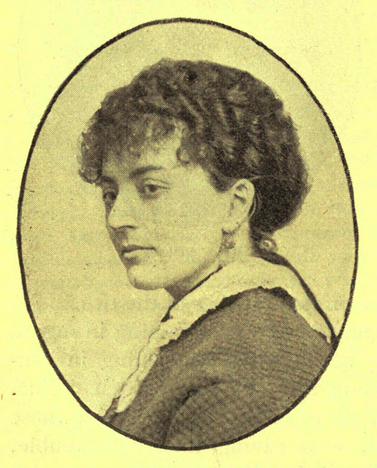
Emma Frances Dawson, from an 1893 publication.

Emma Frances Dawson (1839–1926) was an American poet and writer of supernatural fiction.

== Early life ==
Dawson was born in New England, but by 1880 was living in California, eventually in San Francisco, the setting for most of her stories. Following the 1906 earthquake, she moved to Palo Alto.

== Career ==
Dawson wrote short stories and poems, originally printed in regional publications such as the Argonaut and Overland Monthly. Most of her fiction was reprinted in a collection An Itinerant House, and Other Stories (see references). The work is notable not just for its merit as atmospheric supernatural fiction, but for its detailed description of 19th century San Francisco. Ambrose Bierce, who seems to have been a mentor to Dawson in her literary efforts, praised her work as some of the best being written in the West Coast and representative of the region (as well as having similar high praise for verse).

Despite critical praise and local celebrity status (she was often invited to give public readings of her poems), she struggled to make a living as a writer; reprinting one of her poems, an 1898 newspaper reported she was "so poor that she could not pay her rent last week till the recipient of $50 at the hands of (San Francisco) Mayor Phelan."

== Publications ==
- "The Romance of a Lodger". Overland Monthly and Out West Magazine. 14 (1): 56–64. Jan 1875.
- "A Dead-Head". Overland Monthly and Out West Magazine. 14 (5): 428–438. May 1875.
- "The Voice of California". Overland Monthly and Out West Magazine. 22 (132): 655–658. Dec 1893.
- "A Divine Feast (Translation; originally appeared Short Stories; reprinted in the Hanford Journal)". Hanford Journal. 20 Feb 1894.
- "Story of a Haunted Windmill (San Francisco Call)". UCR California Digital Newspaper Collection. 23 June 1895.
- "Comrades Three". Overland Monthly and Out West Magazine. 32 (190): 356–357. Oct 1898.
- An Itinerant House and Other Stories. W. Doxey. 1897 – via archive.org. Contents: An Itinerant House; Singed Moths; A Stray Reveler; The Night Before the Wedding; The Dramatic is My Destiny; A Gracious Visitation; A Sworn Statement; "The Second Card Wins"; In Silver Upon Purple; "Are the Dead Dead?"
- Ballade of Liberty: And Other Patriotic Verses. Stanford University Press. 1897 – via archive.org.
- "The Death's-Head Masker (Translation from French)". The Argonaut. LXXVII (2001): 68. 31 July 1915.
- "A Gracious Visitation". Book Club of California. 1921.
- An Itinerant House and Other Ghost Stories. Thomas Loring. 2007. Reprint of 1897 collection with biographical introduction and several additional stories: The Romance of a Lodger; A Dead-Head; Shadowed; The Enchanted Ship (translation of "Die Geschichte von dem Gespensterschiff" by Wilhelm Hauff).

== Sources ==
- Purdy, Helen Throop (1926). "Emma Frances Dawson". California Historical Society Quarterly. 5 (1): 87. doi:10.2307/25177798. JSTOR 25177798.
- Hanley, Terence (2012-10-29). "Emma Frances Dawson". Tellers of Weird Tales.
- "An Itinerant House (Advertisement in The Lark Magazine)". Google Books. 1897.
- Works by Emma Frances Dawson in the University of Michigan Making of America Journal Archive
