= Glazov (disambiguation) =

Glazov is a town in the Udmurt Republic, Russia.

Glazov may also refer to:

Places

- Glazov Urban Okrug, a municipal formation part of the town
- Glazov Glacier, Novaya Zemlya

People

Glazov (masculine) or Glazova (feminine) may refer to:

- Jamie Glazov (born 1966), managing editor of FrontPage Magazine in the United States
- Eleonora Glazova, silver medalist in the 2005 International Linguistics Olympiad
- Lyudmila Glazova, Soviet actress cast in The Lark, a 1964 Soviet movie
- Aleksandrs Glazovs (Alexander Glazov) (born 1970), Latvian footballer
- Yurij Yakovlevitch Glazov (1929-2000), also cited as J. J. Glazov, Russian Indologist

== See also ==
- Glazovsky (disambiguation)
