= The Anti-Chomsky Reader =

2004 book edited by Peter Collier and David Horowitz

- Editors: Peter Collier and David Horowitz
- Language: English
- Subject: Noam Chomsky
- Publisher: Encounter Books
- Publication date: 2004
- Publication place: United States
- Media type: Print (Hardcover and Paperback)
- Pages: 240
- ISBN: 1-893554-97-X
- OCLC: 54966287
- Dewey Decimal: 191 22
- LC Class: P85.C47 A84 2004

The Anti-Chomsky Reader is a 2004 anthology book about the linguist and social critic Noam Chomsky edited by Peter Collier and David Horowitz. Its contributors criticize Chomsky's political and linguistic writings, claiming that he cherry-picks facts to fit his theories.

== Contents ==
The Anti-Chomsky Reader contains the following essays:

- An introduction by Peter Collier
- "Whitewashing Dictatorship in Vietnam and Cambodia" by Steven J. Morris, Senior Fellow at The Foreign Policy Institute, Johns Hopkins University, accuses Chomsky of denying repression and mass murder under the communist regimes of Vietnam and Cambodia. Morris claims that Chomsky adheres to a Marxist-derived view of the Indochina wars which refuses to acknowledge the totalitarian nature of the regimes in question. (pages 1–34)
- "Chomsky and the Cold War" by Thomas M. Nichols, chairman of the Department of Strategy and Policy, U.S. Naval War College, claims that Chomsky has distorted the history of the Cold War in order to minimize the role of Communist ideology and blame the conflict on the United States. He accuses Chomsky of misusing sources and footnoting his books in manipulative and dishonest ways "to create a kind of pseudo-academic smog" often leading back to Chomsky's own work. He discusses a 1990 letter from Chomsky to Alexander Cockburn which Nichols claims laments the defeat of the Soviet Union and other Communist states and movements at the end of the Cold War, particularly singling out Czech dissident Václav Havel for vituperation. (pages 35–65)
- "Chomsky and the Media: A Kept Press and a Manipulated People" by Eli Lehrer, former editor of American Enterprise, is a critique of the propaganda model of the media put forward by Edward S. Herman and Chomsky in their book, Manufacturing Consent. Lehrer accuses Chomsky of being "an outsider who knows relatively little about the media... except to the degree that 'media subservience' serves to explain why there is no outcry against the evil he sees everywhere in the American enterprise." (pages 67–84)
- "Chomsky's War Against Israel" by Paul Bogdanor criticizes Chomsky's stance on Israel. Bogdanor charges that Chomsky distorts historical fact and falsely accuses Israel of atrocities and rejectionism while downplaying Arab aggression and violence against the Jewish State. (pages 87–116)
- "Chomsky and Holocaust Denial", by Werner Cohn of Brooklyn, New York and professor emeritus of sociology at the University of British Columbia, analyzes Chomsky's role in the Faurisson affair through his connections to Faurisson's publisher La Vieille Taupe. Cohn accuses Chomsky of close connections to French anti-semites and Holocaust Deniers through this organization (pages 117–58). Chomsky replied in Outlook.
- "Chomsky and 9/11" by David Horowitz and Ronald Radosh analyzes a speech given by Chomsky at MIT immediately after 9/11. Horowitz and Radosh allege that "Chomsky detected [a] plot by Washington to deliberately starve 3 to 4 million innocent Afghan civilians". They also claim that Chomsky justifies the 9/11 attacks in his speech and distorts American history to make the United States appear to be a terrorist nation. (pages 161–80)
- "Noam Chomsky's Anti-American Obsession", by David Horowitz, accuses Chomsky of being an anti-American ideologue who sees the United States as evil and rewrites American history accordingly. Horowitz claims that Chomsky is the intellectual source of left-wing anti-Americanism today. (pages 181–200)
- "A Corrupted Linguistics" by Robert D. Levine and Paul M. Postal, both professors of linguistics, claims that Chomsky's linguistic work has been largely superseded or abandoned. They also accuse Chomsky of intellectual misconduct in his linguistic writings. (pages 203–31)
- "Chomsky, Language, World War II and Me" by John Williamson criticizes Chomsky's linguistic work and recounts a long email debate between Chomsky and the author in which Williamson claims Chomsky repeatedly lied about his own statements and about historical facts and sources. (pages 233–48)

The authors claim Chomsky suppresses evidence to suit his theories.

== Criticism of The Propaganda Model ==
Eli Lehrer criticized the propaganda model theory on several points. According to Lehrer, the theory:

- ignores revelations by the media of government and corporate misconduct and that it is this kind of reporting that wins rewards and gives reputation. (page 76)
- neglects that major media such as The Wall Street Journal and The New York Times sharply disagree on most issues in their editorials. The owners of media also have different political views. Media companies may also be owned by thousands of shareholders. While some CEOs may see their company as a soapbox for their own views, most do not, and a single media company sometimes owns newspapers with very different editorials. (pages 69–70)
- is inconsistent, sometimes arguing that the media only serve to distract people with unimportant entertainment and little real news, but sometimes instead arguing that the media move public opinion on all important issues and current events. (page 70)
- is incorrect regarding the influence of advertisers. Chomsky and Herman have pointed to two statements from two advertisers who in the 1970s wanted the programming that carried their ads to present a generally positive view of business. Lehrer argues that entertainment programs are in fact anti-business, with one study finding businessmen three times more likely than any other profession to be depicted as criminals, and nine times out of ten depicted as being primarily motivated by greed. (pages 74–76)
- has difficulty explaining the popularity of conservative radio talk shows. Assuming that people want to hear the far-left political views that Chomsky advocates, but are being fed right-wing views by filtered media, or lulled into compliancy by mindless entertainment, then they should at least not voluntarily tune into conservative views. (page 78)
- ignores alternative explanations for differences in media coverage. For example, Chomsky has frequently argued that the greater US media coverage of the murder of the priest Jerzy Popieluszko in Communist Poland, as compared with the US media coverage of the murders of priests in Latin America, is evidence for the theory. Lehrer argues that there are many alternative explanations, like that the very fact that such murders were common in Latin America meant that they were not new news. Or that Popieluszko had played a prominent part in protests which a few years earlier had forced military intervention and that his murder further turned the public opinion in Poland against the Communist regime. (pages 79–81)
- ignores new media such as the many forms of Internet media. Although Manufacturing Consent was published before the Internet, Chomsky has continued to almost entirely ignore these media also in recent publications and speeches. When commenting, he seems to have a poor knowledge of the Internet, for example stating that only "sizeable commercial entities" have run successful Internet sites, which Lehrer argues is strange for someone claiming to be a modern media theorist. (pages 77–78)
- is not new, but only another variant of the Marxist idea of "false consciousness". (page 72)
- treats with contempt the views and opinions of nearly all people, who are described as the "bewildered herd." People are either too stupid to understand how media manipulates every aspect of their lives, or complicit pawns. (page 82)

== Reception ==
The conservative historian Keith Windschuttle, in a review in the conservative magazine New Criterion, states that "Collier, Horowitz, and their six other authors have produced a book that has long been needed. It provides a penetrating coverage of the disgraceful career of a disgraceful but very influential man, who has so far avoided a criticism as thoroughgoing as this."

The author Anthony F. Greco criticized Collier and Horowitz for being biased and selective and not acknowledging any merit in Chomsky's writings.

The English professor Mark Bauerlein, in a generally positive review in the libertarian magazine Reason, claims that "Collier and Horowitz understand well the manufactured reality of political fame, and to dismantle it requires not contrary vitriol or clever rejoinders but direct, fact-based assertions that undermine the authenticity of the image. To that end, the contributors follow a simple procedure: Quote actual statements by Chomsky and test them for evidence and logic. The best contributions to the volume add the effective and timely tactic of citing Chomsky's progressive virtues and revealing how smoothly he abandons them."

In Commentary Magazine, which writes on Jewish issues, Arch Puddington called The Anti-Chomsky Reader “The most comprehensive critique of Chomsky that has yet appeared,” and that it “benefits from the political sophistication of its contributors, most of whom are familiar with the dynamics of radical politics and are not distracted by Chomsky's pretense to scholarly rigor and truth-seeking.”

John Feffer accused Collier and Horowitz of blatant dishonesty and has stated that they wrote the book to attack Chomsky because their careers were failing after their popularity died out during the Clinton administration years. Feffer also added that they had to make a dishonest living creating fictitious allegations of liberal bias in academia.

James Lannigan and Neil McLaughlin wrote that David Horowitz was a "crusader against radical professors", and aside from compiling The Anti-Chomsky Reader, he'd also included Chomsky in The 101 Most Dangerous Professors.
