= Discover the Networks =

Website that tracks left-wing individuals and groups

- Website type: Online database
- Available in: English
- Owner: David Horowitz Freedom Center
- Revenue: Donations
- Website: discoverthenetworks.org
- Commercial: No
- Current status: Active

Discover the Networks (originally Discover the Network) (DtN) is a website run by the David Horowitz Freedom Center that focuses on tracking individuals, groups, and the history of groups that are politically left wing. DtN was launched in 2004 and has a staff of about a dozen contributors. Its editor-in-chief was David Horowitz; John Perazzo is the project's managing editor, and Richard Poe is its investigative editor. Discover the Networks is associated with FrontPage Magazine.

== Overview ==
The project's contributors contend that the political left in the United States commonly applies a "deceptive public presentation" of itself that conceals a network of affiliations and shared political views with "radical agendas". It views these as socialist, environmentalist and "anti-American" causes. The website is meant to be the conservative analog of left-leaning websites that compile lists that include conservatives such as those created by Southern Poverty Law Center and Media Matters.

The website has been criticized for including leftists on the same list as terrorists. Horowitz, who wrote about the alleged connection between these groups in his book Unholy Alliance, says "that groups who despise one another might actually be working closely together, maybe without even knowing it." It's not what they are for but that they are "linked by anti-Americanism" that accounts for their being in alignment on the political front. Dean Saitta objects to being described as a supporter of Ward Churchill.

== Database of profiles ==
DtN currently maintains a database of prominent leftist personalities in academia, politics, and the media as well as leftist interest groups. It assembles and publishes data on the financial backers of left wing personalities and organizations. Much of their research focuses upon individuals with financial connections to groups that espouse communism and socialism as well as Palestinians and their supporters, but the group is also concerned with critics of the USA PATRIOT Act, advocates of social justice (which the website refers to as a "post-Communist terminology for socialism and communism"), and members or supporters of labor unions.

When first launched the website was criticized for a jump page picturing entertainment celebrities such as Bruce Springsteen and Barbra Streisand adjacent to radical Muslim terrorists. The site now divides the pictures on the jump page into distinct categories.

== Contributors ==
The website hosts the articles of historian Ron Radosh.

The website hosts the articles of undercover investigative journalist Lee Kaplan.
