= Christine Douglass-Williams =

Canadian blogger, author, journalist

- Born: Trinidad and Tobago
- Occupations: Blogger, author, former television journalist

Christine Douglass-Williams is a Canadian blogger, author, former television journalist and board member of the Canadian Race Relations Foundation, who was fired for her writings on the blog Jihad Watch.

== Background ==
Douglass-Williams emigrated as a child from Trinidad and Tobago to Canada. She is of mixed-race background, with a quarter each of Indian, Scottish, Chinese and black ancestry.

== Career ==
Douglass-Williams is a nine-time international award-winning journalist and television producer, with her awards including Telly, Videographer, and Omni Awards. She conducted over 1,700 live interviews on a daily call-in show On the Line on the former CTS TV and was a fill-in host on 100 Huntley Street, and has also been on the board of governors of the Gatestone Institute, a senior advisor to the Hudson Institute, and served as the Public Affairs and Media Consultant for the International Christian Embassy Jerusalem – Canada. She has later been an associate editor at FrontPage Magazine as well as a daily writer for Jihad Watch, both publications of the David Horowitz Freedom Center.

She published her first book in 2017, The Challenge of Modernizing Islam: Reformers Speak Out and the Obstacles They Face, which interviewed eight leading Muslim reformers, including Salim Mansur, Ahmed Subhy Mansour, Tawfik Hamid, Qanta Ahmed, Zuhdi Jasser and Raheel Raza.

=== Termination from CRRF ===
Douglass-Williams was appointed to the board of the Canadian Race Relations Foundation (CRRF) in 2012, but her writings on the blog Jihad Watch starting not long after eventually led to her being terminated from her position in 2017. The decision came after she had been put under review for an essay that warned Icelanders that they were being "duped" by seemingly moderate Muslims. She wrote the piece after travelling to Iceland with Robert Spencer to speak at a conference on Islam and the future of European culture in Reykjavík. Citing her book, Douglas-Williams later claimed to "differentiate between Islamists and human rights-respecting Muslims who thrive to live peaceably and equally among Westerners." On the other hand, she also advocates the notion that even "seemingly moderate Muslims" practice taqiyya in order to hide their campaign of taking over the Western world.

She wrote the book Fired by the Canadian Government for Criticizing Islam: Multicultural Canada: A Weak Link In the Battle Against Islamization in 2018 about the case, which was published by the Center for Security Policy as part of its "counterjihad campaign".

== Bibliography ==
- The Challenge of Modernizing Islam: Reformers Speak Out and the Obstacles They Face. Encounter. 2017. ISBN 978-1594039393.
- Fired by the Canadian Government for Criticizing Islam: Multicultural Canada: A Weak Link In the Battle Against Islamization. Center for Security Policy Press. 2018. ISBN 978-1727738438.
