= Sam Richards (sociologist) =

American sociologist (born 1960)

- Born: Samuel Martell Richards; September 3rd 1960; Toledo, Ohio, U.S.
- Spouse: Laurie Mulvey

Academic background
- Education: University of Toledo (BA, MA); Rutgers University (PhD)
- Thesis: Priests and praxis: Liberation theology and socioeconomic change in Ecuador (1992)

Academic work
- Discipline: Sociology
- Main interests: Korean studies

Samuel Martell Richards is a sociologist and professor at Pennsylvania State University, and a distinguished professor of digital culture and content in Konkuk University.

== Life and education ==
Richards was born in 1960 in Toledo, Ohio. During his younger years, Richards aspired to become a rock and roll star, but later found an interest in sociology after enrolling in college. He received a Bachelor of Arts degree in 1983 and a Master of Arts degree in 1985, at the University of Toledo. He achieved his doctorate in sociology in 1992 at Rutgers University.

Richards married Laurie Mulvey, a Penn State graduate, in 1993.

== Career ==
In 1990, Richards was appointed as a professor of sociology at Pennsylvania State University. From 2011, he began uploading streams of his course, Sociology 119: "Race, Ethnicity, and Culture" (SOC 119), on YouTube. In 2018, SOC 119 was featured on "You Can't Say That", a reality TV broadcast which won the Mid-Atlantic Emmy Awards in 2016. The class has been described as "the largest race and ethnic relations class in the US."

In the early 2000s, Richards co-founded World in Conversation, a public diplomacy center within Penn State's College of the Liberal Arts, with Mulvey.

On May 25, 2023, Konkuk University announced its nomination of Richards as a distinguished professor of digital culture and content. On December 26, 2023, Richards was nominated as a 'Kimchi Ambassador' by the World Institute of Kimchi, a South Korean government research organization under the Ministry of Science and ICT.

== Public reception ==
Richards was featured in David Horowitz's 2006 book, The Professors: The 101 Most Dangerous Academics in America, which criticized his alleged issuing of "out-of-class assignments," including the "viewing of left-wing propaganda films, such as The Oil Factor." Richards responded to these claims, citing that his students "also receive credit for attending 'conservative' events, including a talk by none other than David Horowitz" himself.

In 2018, Richards lectured on the rising influence of South Korean media on SOC 119, arguing that South Korean media content—citing BTS as an example—would become widely popular in the following years. From 2021, Richards began gaining recognition in South Korea as a "hallyu missionary" when his 2018 lecture resurfaced virally following the success of Squid Game. Richards has pinpointed the relative absence of violence or nudity in Korean media, along with the integration of globalized digital media platforms, as the driving forces behind the emergence of the Korean Wave. He has commended the enlistment of BTS members in South Korea's mandatory military service, and has suggested the preservation of "Koreaness" for the long-term success of Korean content.

The Colombian magazine Semana dubbed Richards and Mulvey "the parents of radical empathy."
