= My Mother's Story =

Book by Majid Rafizadeh

My Mother's Story: A Journey Through Poverty, Repression, Civil War, Patience, and Perseverance
- Author: Dr. Majid Rafizadeh
- Subject: Islam feminism women memoir democracy freedom human rights
- Publisher: Fingerprint Press
- Publication date: 2015
- Pages: 222
- ISBN: 978-8175993013
- OCLC: 8175993014

My Mother's Story: A Journey Through Poverty, Repression, Civil War, Patience, and Perseverance is a book written by Majid Rafizadeh (born December 25, 1980) an American political scientist, public speaker, human rights activist, Harvard University scholar and TV commentator who grew up in Iran and Syria. The book was published in 2015 by Fingerprint Press. The Telegraph (Calcutta) said it "provides a valuable insight" into the oppression women face.

In his memoir, Rafizadeh relates his and his mother's life in patriarchal, male-dominated systems and Islam. He addresses the social, political, and cultural history of Islam from a socio-political and psychological perspective.

== See also ==
- Protecting Human Rights of Children and Women
