= Red diaper baby =

Child of parents with Communist Party ties

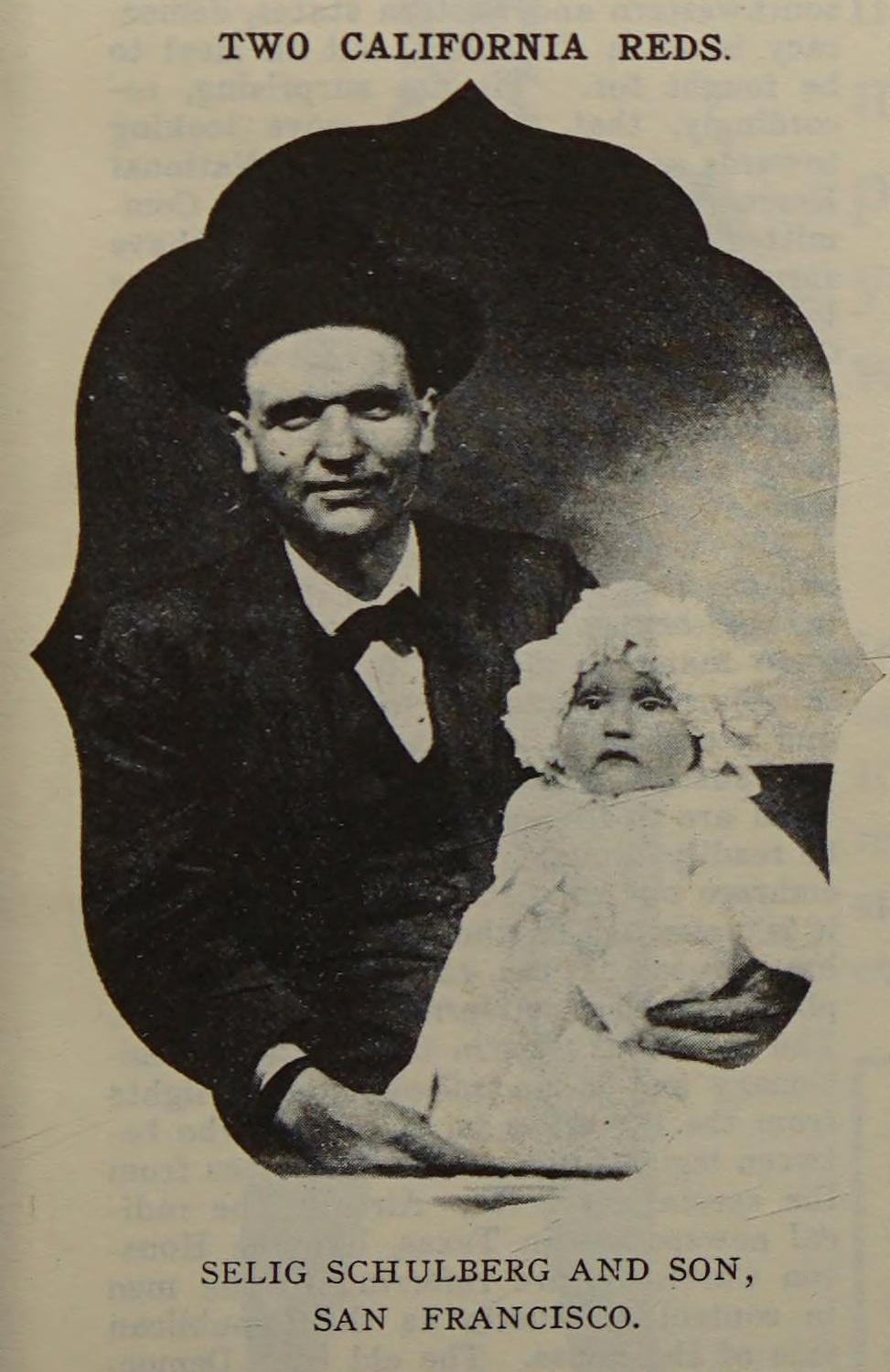
Selig Schulberg, a socialist trade unionist from San Francisco, and his son in the International Socialist Review, October 1909

A red diaper baby is a child of parents who were members of the Communist Party USA (CPUSA) or the Communist Party of Canada, or were close to the party or sympathetic to its aims.

== History ==
Gary Younge points out that the term "red diaper baby" originated in the 1920s as an insult. It was "aimed at the Communist party's internal aristocracy, which ensured that those with parents in the party would find themselves promoted rapidly through the party ranks". During the 1960s Berkeley Free Speech Movement, the right-wing John Birch Society published a list of Berkeley student leaders, such as Bettina Aptheker, who were "red diaper babies". Instead of stigmatizing the named students, the disclosures had the opposite effect by helping them find one another and build a support network. In the years that followed, the term began appearing in popular culture without a pejorative connotation, e.g., in the 1976 film Marathon Man, the audience learns that the protagonist, Thomas Levy, played by Dustin Hoffman, is a red diaper baby.

In their 1998 book Red Diapers: Growing Up in the Communist Left, Judy Kaplan and Linn Shapiro define red diaper babies as "children of CPUSA members, children of former CPUSA members, and children whose parents never became members of the CPUSA but were involved in political, cultural, or educational activities led or supported by the Party". More generally, the term is sometimes used to refer to a child of any radical parent, regardless of that parent's party affiliations. Shapiro writes that red diaper babies commonly reported "growing up with a sense of difference, both specialness and fear; feeling part of an international community and yet isolated from the mainstream of their own country." She adds that as adults, they "may or may not be political activists. Within families, siblings often differ in type and degree of activism and impact of the 'red diaper' experience on their lives."

In the U.S. and Canada, notable red diaper babies have included journalists Carl Bernstein and David Maraniss, rock singer Country Joe McDonald, poet Allen Ginsberg, playwright David Mamet, essayist Vivian Gornick, historians Linda Gordon, Rosalyn Baxandall and Ronald Radosh, philosopher G. A. Cohen, conservative activist David Horowitz, politician Roland Penner, scientist Richard Levins, and Michael and Robert Meeropol, the sons of Julius and Ethel Rosenberg. Josh Kornbluth titled his 1996 autobiography and its related one-man show, Red Diaper Baby. Kornbluth's show was filmed by Doug Pray for the 2004 documentary film Red Diaper Baby. Canadian political scientist James Laxer called his 2004 memoir, Red Diaper Baby: A Boyhood in the Age of McCarthyism.
