= The Truth About Muhammad =

2006 book by Robert Spencer

- Author: Robert Spencer
- Audio read by: James Adams
- Language: English
- Subject: Muhammad
- Genre: Biography
- Published: September 15, 2006
- Publisher: Regnery Publishing
- Publication place: United States
- Media type: Print
- Pages: 256
- ISBN: 978-1-59698-028-0
- OCLC: 232648493
- Dewey Decimal: 297.6/3
- LC Class: BT1170 .S657 2006

The Truth About Muhammad: Founder of the World's Most Intolerant Religion is a biography by American anti-Muslim author Robert Spencer about the Islamic prophet Muhammad. Written from a critical perspective towards its subject, this book examines the life of Muhammad in ten chapters based on the sources provided by his early biographers, together with the Quran and the hadith, while also challenging their historical authenticity.

The book was released on 15 September 2006 by Regnery Publishing and appeared on the New York Times best-seller list for a week. The critical reception of the book was generally unfavorable, with Spencer being criticized for his selective use of sources, subjective interpretation and anachronistic reading of the historical context. Positive reviews were given mostly by Christian and conservative publications, with Human Events including it in its listing of "Top 10 Conservative Books of 2006".

== Synopsis ==
A work of American author and counter-jihadist Robert Spencer, the book is a biography of Muhammad, who founded Islam (an Abrahamic religion that originated in the 7th-century Arabic Peninsula), where he is regarded as the last prophet sent by God. A highly critical work both towards Muhammad and Islam, it consists of ten chapters and begins with a chronology of Muhammad's life and the glossary of names and places related to it. In the first chapter, Spencer writes of the reasons behind writing this book. He writes that the book does not comprehensively detail Muhammad's life but providing insights into an outline of his career.

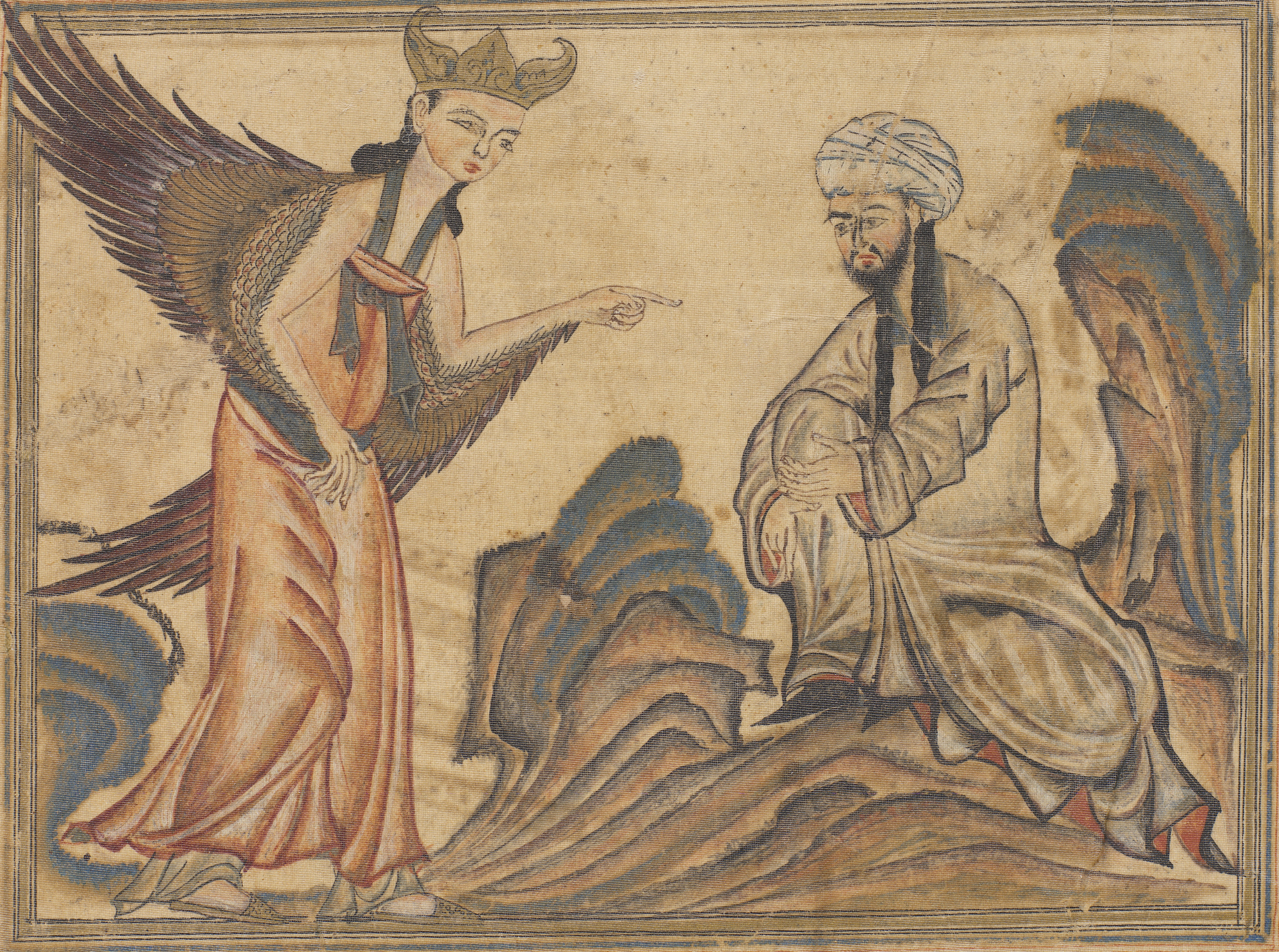
Depictions of Muhammad receiving his first revelation from the Angel Jibril (جِبْرِيل)

Chapter two presents Spencer's assessment of the earliest sources for Muhammad. He starts with the Quran, the religious text of Islam; he notes that it contains little details about Muhammad, and often the stories are told indirectly or incompletely. Next, he goes on to write about the hadiths, a record of the words and actions Muhammad transmitted through chains of narrators. Although presents great details about his life, Spencer observes that it is nearly impossible to know which parts of it that are true or not. The prophetic biography, the traditional Muslim biographies of Muhammad comes the last in Spencer's investigation.

Spencer's biography of Muhammad starts in chapter three. He begins with describing Muhammad's tribe, the Quraysh, the situation of the pre-Islamic Arabia, and the religions that were predominantly practiced there, with the Quraysh's was paganism. Spencer writes of Muhammad's early life, including his birth traditionally believed to be taking place in Mecca on April 20, 570. Spencer then describes the pivotal role of Muhammad's later-wife Khadija bint Khuwaylid, who would be the first one to convert to Islam; this took place after he reportedly received his first visitation by the archangel Gabriel in the cave of Jabal al-Nour.

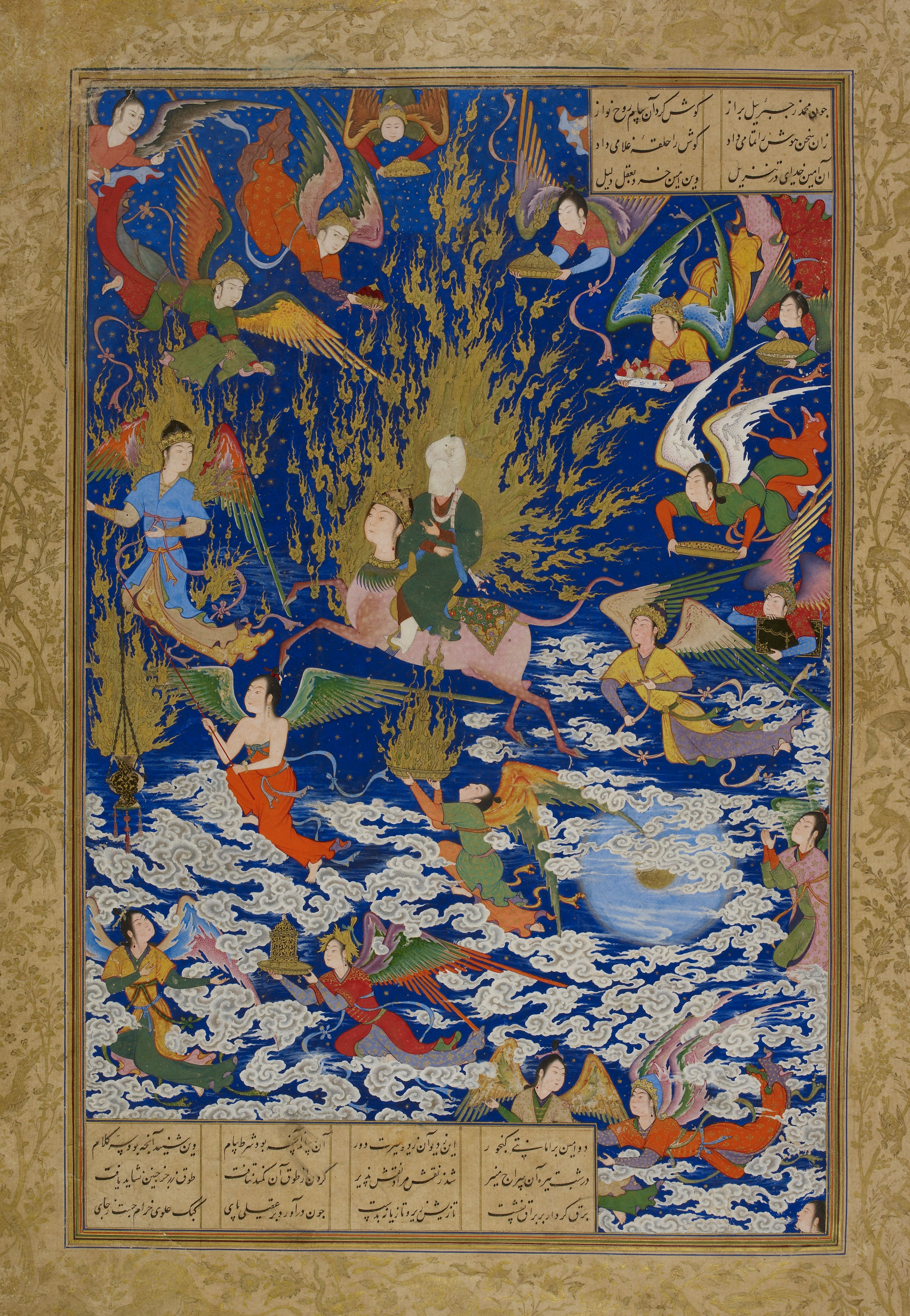
... and the Isra and Miraj.

Chapter four contains Spencer's theories that Muhammad borrowed teachings from other religions, mainly Christianity and Judaism. His arguments are based on, what he believed to be, the similarities between Islam and these religions, including their monotheistic conceptions of God and listing of prophetic figures. Spencer starts looking at the Quran; he notes many of its narratives resemble the Bible's, such as its human origin myth of Adam and Eve. Spencer also compares the accounts presented in the Quran with those in the apocrypha and other non-canonical works, including the Talmud and the Syriac Infancy Gospel. Other religions he assumes to have been influencing Islam include the Persian Zoroastrianism and the Indian Hinduism.

Chapter five details Muhammad's early preachings of Islam; Muhammad was met with objections from his own tribe, including his uncle Abū Lahab. Spencer talks about the incident of the Satanic Verses, in which Muhammad had allegedly mistaken the words of Satan to be those of God, and Muhammad's miraculous journey referred to as the Isra and Mi'raj. The next four chapters focuses on the military career of Muhammad. In chapter six, the Hijrah (his journey from Mecca to Medina) and his covenant with Christians and Jews are discussed. In the seventh chapter, Spencer examines the details of several wars that had Muhammad participating in, including the Battles of Badr and Uhud. The eighth chapter discusses points such as the Battle of the Trench, the Battle of Khaybar and the Treaty of Hudaybiyya, and the Conquest of Mecca, the Battle of Hunayn, the Expedition of Tabuk and the death of Muhammad in the next chapter.

Spencer dedicates the book's final chapter to Muhammad's "legacy". He accuses him of having motivated terrorism, pedophilia, misogyny, inhuman punishments (which includes stoning for adulterers and amputation for thieves) and religious intolerance.

== Release ==
Through the conservative Regnery Publishing, The Truth About Muhammad was published on hardcover on September 15, 2006, and paperback on July 17, 2007. Blackstone Audio provided its audiobook version on 26 October 2006. The book has also been available on Amazon Kindle, narrated by James Adams. The book appeared in The New York Times Best Seller list on 29 October 2006. Due to containing "objectionable materials", it was eventually banned in Pakistan. Shahid Ahmed, the counselor of community affairs of the Embassy of Pakistan, Washington, D.C., deemed it "very, very damaging—let me tell you". In response, Spencer bemoaned that the entirety of the book was based on the traditional Islamic sources and found it "interesting that they would say the book contains 'objectionable materials' ... It manifests a certain cultural insecurity that, instead of having a fruitful dialogue or debate about what's in the book, the Pakistani government just bans and confiscates it."

== Critical reception ==
=== Popular ===
The Truth About Muhammad received a mixed reception in the popular media. British author of comparative religion Karen Armstrong gave a scathing review, calling it "a depressing read". Armstrong found Spencer unable to understand Muhammad in the cultural, economic, historical, political and spiritual circumstances of 7th-century Arabian Peninsula, leading him to making "basic and bad mistakes of fact". She noted that the author cherry-picked his sources, for instance, including only Quranic passages that are hostile to Christian and Jews but omitting the others that insist on Islam's tolerance with them. She wrote that non-Muslims' ignorance of Islam would be really helpful for Spencer to achieve his anti-Islamic aim, mockingly describing his book as a gift for extremists of the same views "to 'prove' to those Muslims who have been alienated by events in Palestine, Lebanon and Iraq that the west is incurably hostile to their faith".

"If you want to spend a depressing afternoon, try flipping through Robert Spencer's The Truth About Muhammad. It's not a long read, but when you're through you'll have an idea of the monumental task awaiting the West."

— William Tucker of The American Spectator

Ben Maldonado of The Stanford Daily called his book one-sided and criticised his poor, repetitive writing style. While presenting itself as a biography of Muhammad, Maldonado felt nothing biographical in this book since, he believed, it is more a chronicle of "the more negative and controversial aspects" of its subject and provides nothing beneficial to the historiography of Islam. In his 2008 book Nabi Kita Dihina Saudara! (The Prophet is Mocked by our Friends!), Indonesian author Muhammad Nurhidayat suggested Spencer to learn from the works of objective scholars, including Armstrong, John Esposito, William Muir and W. Montgomery Watt, before writing his own book.

Christian and conservative publications welcomed the book. Andrew C. McCarthy of the National Review wrote: "Robert Spencer graphically illustrates the depth of our folly in thinking—or, rather, blithely assuming—otherwise. An alarming book, and a necessary one." Paul Bower of the New Oxford Review praised Spencer's painstaking research of traditional Islamic biographies of Muhammad and on their contradictory nature. Bower continued that, in spite of its critical tones, he regarded the book undoubtfully as "an essential resource, a reliable and duly documented account of who Muhammad really was, and a challenge to those who would assume that his actions and his life are perfectly just within the framework of Western society". Srđa Trifković found the book brief yet readable while Elizabeth Kantor deemed it an important contribution to understanding Muhammad. Human Events included the book in their "Top 10 Conservative Books of 2006" listing.

David Thompson of The Guardian labelled The Truth About Muhammad "a detailed and timely riposte to common misconceptions, outlining the mismatch between belief and historical reality and documenting the ways in which Muhammad's own deeds and purported revelations are used verbatim to mandate intolerance, xenophobia and homicidal 'martyrdom'". Thompson added that Spencer "identifies the problem upon which current tensions hinge. A tradition of hagiography and censorship within the Islamic world has created a woefully inadequate picture of this most problematic of religious figures."

=== Scholarly ===
Scholars were almost unanimously critical towards the book. Deepika Bains and Aziza Ahmed of the Asian American Law Journal condemned Spencer for his failure to have an objective stance; for instance, he used the negatively connoted mujehedins and jihadists to refer to Muslims. The reviewers also noted many statements by Spencer that were not founded on provable evidence but his personal opinion, such as claiming that investigations for a historic Muhammad would not get a significant audience in Islamic world. Bains and Ahmed wrote a pervasive theme of the book is all Muslims are "violent jihadists", and that he relied on his selective interpretation of the Quran and Islamic history. They concluded that, with all the book's lack of analysis and historical context, "The Truth About Muhammad accomplishes Spencer's goal of vilifying Muslims and misinforming readers about Islam ... However, Robert Spencer exercises his right to free speech free from responsibility, choosing instead to inspire hatred and encourage intolerance."

Tariq Aziz, Muhammad Shahbaz Manj and Saima Shahbaz Manj, reviewing for Al-Qamar, wrote that Spencer relied too much on his subjective opinion in the book and "has produced a work that not only denigrates the Prophet Muhammad, he even denigrates Islam as a religion of peace, holiness, tolerance and kindness." University of Cape Town professor of religious studies Abdulkader Tayob argued that while the book presents itself as a biography of Muhammad, it however "intends to say something more specifically about Muslims". Tayob cited Spencer as having provided "a sophisticated example of a general trend: turning to the Prophet to create an impression of the Islamic threat." Author of interfaith dialogue Craig Considine cited the book as one of the many popular examples in the 21st century in which Muhammad has been misportrayed as a cruel figure, pedophile and one who discriminates against religious minorities like Jews and Christians.

Joseph S. Spoerl of the Middle East Quarterly wrote a more positive review; he commented that the biography "deserves a wide audience" but opined that its title is sensationalistic and noted a number of chronological mistakes, such as dating the Expedition of Tabuk to 631.

== See also ==
- Lists of banned books
- The Satanic Verses
