= United in Hate =

2009 book by Jamie Glazov

- Author: Jamie Glazov
- Language: English
- Publisher: WND Books
- Publication date: March 3, 2009
- Publication place: United States
- Pages: 304
- ISBN: 978-1935071600

United in Hate: The Left's Romance with Tyranny and Terror is a 2009 book by Jamie Glazov. In the book, Glazov analyses what he sees as segments of the political left's sympathies for radical Islamists.

== Content ==
Among those Glazov accuses of having found common ground with Islamic terrorists are Jimmy Carter, Michael Moore, Noam Chomsky, Ramsey Clark, Lynne Stewart, and Stanley Cohen, while noting that Norman Mailer called the 9/11 hijackers "brilliant", and Ted Turner calling them "brave". According to Glazov, "The Left's hatred of America is not the cause, it's a symptom. Hard-core leftists hate simply for the sake of hate. The outspoken leaders of the hard Left, Glazov documents, are not happy, contented people. They are as alienated from what they would scornfully call a 'bourgeois' lifestyle as any suicide bomber." He also notes that they "fall in love with mass-murdering reprobates who propose utopia of any kind - though utopia is the cover motive, not the real attraction."

== Reception ==
Jonathan Schanzer wrote in Middle East Quarterly that Glazov "exposes the hypocrisy of leftists and liberals who claim to champion the principles of freedom, democracy, liberalism, and feminism yet support both communist and Islamist dictatorships, which implement none of these principles."

In The Jerusalem Post, David Forsmark wrote that it is "a revolutionary book, in the best sense of the word. It gives a coherent explanation for a much-remarked-about phenomenon that most commentators have merely used to score irony points."

Bruce S. Thornton said in City Journal that the book "is a valuable aid for those wishing to understand one of the strangest spectacles in history: a large number of a society's most privileged people, who enjoy unprecedented freedom, education, material well-being, and leisure, relentlessly attacking the institutions and ideals that make such benefits possible—and extolling enemies who seek to destroy all of these goods."

Nick Dyrenfurth noted in the Australian Journal of Jewish Studies that "on the face of it, a scholarly study of the relationship between the far left and political Islam is a worthwhile, if not urgent endeavour", but concludes that "United by Hate is a missed opportunity. In part this owes to the author's own politics of hate. An uber-conservative warrior, Glazov has no sympathy for even the mildest form of social democracy. He is all too eager to paint the entire spectrum of left-of-centre politics as morally bankrupt or worse."
