= Red Diapers =

1998 book about the children of CPUSA members

- Cover of the 1998 paperback edition
- Editors: Judy Kaplan, Linn Shapiro
- Publisher: University of Illinois Press
- Publication date: 1998
- Publication place: United States
- Pages: 320
- ISBN: 0252021614
- OCLC: 38281715

Red Diapers: Growing Up in the Communist Left, published in 1998, was the first anthology of writings by "red diaper babies": children born of Communist Party USA (CPUSA) members or of parents who would become affiliated with the Party. Edited by Judy Kaplan and Linn Shapiro, the book consists mainly of autobiographical essays; however, a few of the red diaper babies chose to express themselves via poems or short stories.

While most of the book's 47 contributors are not well-known names, there are exceptions such as journalist Carl Bernstein, feminist writer Kim Chernin, political activist Bettina Aptheker, scientist Richard Levins, and author/activist Robert Meeropol (son of Julius and Ethel Rosenberg). All of the contributors were born between 1909 and 1974.

Red Diapers was not reviewed in the mainstream press, but it did receive favorable coverage in leftist and academic publications, and was praised by notable figures from 20th century American radical politics, including Pete Seeger, Ring Lardner, Jr., Howard Zinn, and Angela Davis.

== Description ==
In the book's Introduction, Judy Kaplan and Linn Shapiro (both red diaper babies) explain how they organized the autobiographical essays into three thematic sections:

1. Family Albums focuses on the daily lives of red diaper babies and the unique experiences of being raised in an American Communist family.
2. Political Trauma as Personal History documents the effects of red-baiting and political persecution on the child's developing psyche, with Robert Meeropol (Julius and Ethel Rosenberg's youngest son) being the best exemplar.
3. Claiming Our Heritage "examines varied ways in which red diaper babies have come to terms with a left-wing political legacy", with some of the writers embracing that legacy in their adulthood, and others expressing resentment at what they considered early indoctrination, and choosing to distance themselves from any political involvement.

Within each section, the essays are sorted chronologically by the birth year of the contributor.

Kaplan and Shapiro assert that those who view Communism as a monolithic ideology "would be surprised at the variety of parenting styles described in this anthology. Some authors recall their parents as warm and supportive; others depict families in which deviant politics exacerbated parental dysfunction. Still others describe growing up with parents who were loving yet oblivious to the challenges, even traumas, their children faced." The editors also claim that the book's essays raise broader questions that are not specific to red diaper babies, such as "How are political values transmitted across generations?" and "What role have political subcultures played in sustaining dissident movements?"

In her assessment of the book, Professor Robbie Lieberman observed a common burden felt by many of the contributors:

One problem that was clearly distinct to Communist families was that the children were overwhelmed by carrying the weight of what they referred to as "the secret." The secret was the fact that their parents were Communists—a piece of information children knew they were never supposed to reveal. Especially around the time of the Rosenbergs' executions, children worried about whether they would reveal "the secret" under torture, which could make them responsible for the deaths of their own parents.

Safeguarding the secret sometimes required living a double life, or "passing" as a person with mild political views—a predicament which Dorothy Zellner conveys in her essay titled "Proletaria and Me". She recalls that as a "quasi-Bohemian" teenage art student in the early 1950s, she was:

careful not to reveal my other life, my life in the Left, which contained a completely different set of people and activities. As a member of the Labor Youth League, I did things that the typical high-school student did not do: I went to "meetings," I attended "study groups" and "lectures" about the "principal questions of the day," and I went to "rallies" about the Rosenbergs or banning the H-bomb or against the House Un-American Activities Committee. This required some juggling: I couldn't actually say to my high-school friends that I was going to a meeting – what 15 year-old goes to meetings? I tried to deflect inquiries from friends about where I was going; if they really pressed me, I invented some boring and inconvenient family functions where my presence was mandatory.

== Reception ==
Upon its publication in 1998, Red Diapers was not reviewed in The New York Times, The Washington Post, The New York Review of Books, Los Angeles Times or any of the other mainstream outlets that review current books. However, it was lauded in leftist publications, for example, in the Communist History Network Newsletter, Pat Devine of University of Manchester said of Red Diapers: "Through it we enter a world populated by ordinary people who did extraordinary things in exceptional circumstances as they worked to make the world a better place."

In the blurbs for Red Diapers, Pete Seeger wrote, "I recommend this book to any young person curious about people in the twentieth-century U.S.A. who called themselves communists. It's a diverse lot of intimate recollections, more reliable than the academic or political generalities we've heard for years. Lots of contradictions and tangles." Howard Zinn said it contained "fascinating glimpses of the lives of a special group of people, poignant and thought-provoking—an important contribution to the social history of our time." Angela Davis called the book "A remarkable collective memoir.... It bears witness to a powerful tradition of radical 'family values' from which emerged a generation of leftist organizers who have made an indelible mark on U.S. social movements. Perhaps most importantly, this wonderful volume demystifies the process of radicalization by foregrounding the humanity of those of us whose family legacies have been defined by radicalism."

In H-Net Reviews, American historian Jennifer Keene characterized the anthology as "a fascinating array of personal narratives":

In reading Red Diapers, one truly enters a different world. Here, the political is personal, the "right" are the Socialists, children join the Young Pioneers instead of the Boy Scouts, and the FBI sits in an unmarked car across the street. These children grew up immersed in concern for Sacco and Vanzetti, the Scottsboro Boys, and the Rosenbergs. They spent their summers together at cooperative communist camps, were kept out of school by their parents on May Day, and learned all the songs in the little Red Song Book by heart. They lived in an integrated environment where white and black activists met, socialized, and marched together. The authors note with a touch of sadness the days of passing this radical lineage from one generation to the next appear over with the demise of a strong leftist movement in America.

In her review in the Left History journal, Rebecca Schreiber commended Red Diapers for providing new perspectives on aspects of the CPUSA, but also identified shortcomings in the book:

[M]ost notably the limited range in its selection of contributors. The editors were aware of this when they noted in the introduction that "the experiences of the children of Mexican Americans, Japanese Americans, and other immigrant groups that gave the CP its vitality remain to be told. Additionally, only a few African American families are represented here." The editors' acknowledgment makes this absence all the more problematic, leading the reader to wonder by what criterion the editors made their selection. These absences severely limit the collections' representation of the experiences of non-white red diaper babies, as well as the relationship between communities of colour and the Communist Party. In addition, the absence of people of colour in the collection perpetuates the stereotype of the CPUSA as a "white" organization which operated as an outside force in communities of colour.

Schreiber also faulted the editors for treating the various contributions as "raw data" which only required minimal commentary and analysis. Schreiber believed, on the contrary, that the book would have been improved if the editors had supplied an analytical framework, more in-depth than their remarks in the Introduction, to give the essays greater meaning to the reader.

Ronald Radosh sharply criticized Kaplan and Shapiro's approach to editing the anthology:

Ignoring much of the evidence they have themselves assembled in Red Diapers, the editors show that they are true to the CP tradition in which they grew up—there is a right line, and even those who have become slightly critical and disillusioned must keep their eye on the real enemy of the people—which is anyone who believes the future is not something called socialism.

== Bibliography ==
- Kaplan, Judy; Shapiro, Linn, eds. (1998). Red Diapers: Growing Up in the Communist Left. Urbana: University of Illinois Press. ISBN 0252021614.
