= Vivian Gornick =

American feminist critic, journalist, essayist, and memoirist (born 1935)

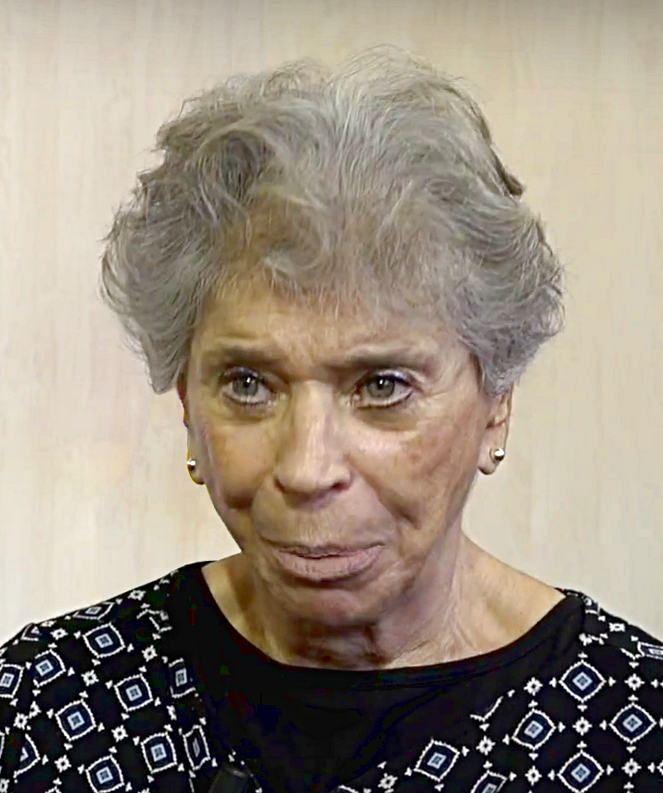
- Gornick in 2018
- Born: June 14, 1935 (age 91); The Bronx, New York City, U.S.
- Education: City College of New York (BA); New York University (MA); University of California, Berkeley
- Occupations: Author; memoirist; essayist
- Writing career
- Subjects: Cultural history, memoir
- Notable work: Fierce Attachments (1987)

Vivian Gornick (born June 14, 1935) is an American radical feminist critic, journalist, essayist, and memoirist.

== Early life and education ==
Vivian Gornick was born on June 14, 1935, in New York City to working-class Jewish immigrant parents from Ukraine. She was raised a "red diaper baby" in a tenement apartment, where her parents' Communist political ideals shaped her daily life, with newspapers like the Daily Worker and Morgen Freiheit as household staples. Her father, Louis, worked as a presser in a garment factory. Her mother, Bess, took an office job during World War II. This experience exposed Gornick to shifting gender dynamics from a young age, which would help shape her aspirations for women's rights in the future. In 1957, Gornick received a bachelor of arts degree from City College of New York and in 1960 a master of arts degree from New York University.

== Career ==
Gornick was a reporter for The Village Voice from 1969 to 1977. Her journalistic work has also appeared in The New York Times, The Nation, Atlantic Monthly, and many other publications.

In 1969, the radical feminist group New York Radical Feminists was founded by Shulamith Firestone and Anne Koedt; Firestone's and Koedt's desire to start this new group was aided by Gornick's 1969 Village Voice essay, "The Next Great Moment in History Is Theirs". At the end of the essay she announced the formation of the group, including a contact address and phone number, which raised considerable national interest from prospective members.

Gornick has published over a dozen books, the most celebrated of which was Fierce Attachments (1987), a memoir about her long battle with her mother for independence. It was hailed by The New York Times for its "mesmerizing, thrilling" truths, and was selected in 2019 by The New York Times Book Review critics as the best memoir of the past 50 years.

Her last published book is Taking a Long Look: Essays on Culture, Literature, and Feminism in Our Time, which appeared in 2021. In that same year, she was awarded the Windham–Campbell Literature Prize for nonfiction.

Gornick taught writing at The New School. For the 2007–2008 academic year, she was a fellow at the Radcliffe Institute at Harvard University, and in 2015 she served as the Bedell Distinguished Visiting Professor in the University of Iowa's Nonfiction Writing Program.

== Bibliography ==
=== Books ===
- Woman in Sexist Society: Studies in Power and Powerlessness (1971; edited with Barbara K. Moran)
- In Search of Ali Mahmoud: an American Woman in Egypt (1973, Saturday Review Press) (Nominated for the 1974 National Book Award)
- The Romance of American Communism (1977, Basic Books; new edition 2020, Verso)
- Essays in Feminism (1978, Harper & Row)
- Women in Science: Portraits from a World in Transition (1983, Simon & Schuster)
- Fierce Attachments: A Memoir (1987, Farrar, Straus and Giroux)
- Approaching Eye Level (1996, Beacon Press)
- The End of the Novel of Love (1997, Beacon Press; Nominated for the 1997 National Book Critics Circle Award for Criticism)
- The Situation and the Story: The Art of Personal Narrative (2001, Farrar, Straus and Giroux)
- The Solitude of Self: Thinking About Elizabeth Cady Stanton (2005, Farrar, Straus and Giroux)
- The Men in My Life (2008, MIT Press; National Book Critics Circle Award finalist for criticism)
- Women in Science: Then and Now (2009, The Feminist Press at CUNY)
- The Ancient Dream (Sep/Oct 2010, Boston Review)
- Emma Goldman: Revolution as a Way of Life. (2011, Yale University Press; Finalist for the 2011 National Jewish Book Award)
- The Odd Woman and the City (May 2015, Farrar, Straus and Giroux)
- Unfinished Business: Notes of a Chronic Re-Reader (2020, Farrar, Straus and Giroux)
- Taking a Long Look: Essays on Culture, Literature, and Feminism in Our Time (2021, Verso)

=== Essays and reporting ===
- "What Independence Has Come to Mean to Me" (2002) The Bitch in the House: 26 Women Tell the Truth about Sex, Solitude, Work, Motherhood and Marriage. William Morrow. ISBN 978-0060936464

=== Book reviews ===
Year	Review article	Work(s) reviewed
1996	Gornick, Vivian (December 1996). "The Prose of Nothingness". The Women's Review of Books. Vol. 14, no. 3. pp. 6–7. JSTOR 4022576.	Didion, Joan (1996). The Last Thing He Wanted. New York: Alfred A. Knopf.
2017	Gornick, Vivian (January–February 2017). "Tied in knots: The modern marriage is an elaborate feat of performance". The New Republic. Vol. 248, no. 1–2. pp. 56–58.	Kristeva, Julia & Philippe Sollers (2016). Marriage As a Fine Art. New York: Columbia University Press.
