= Jamie Glazov =

Canadian author and historian (born 1966)

- Born: 1966 (age 59–60); Moscow, Soviet Union
- Education: Dalhousie University (MA); York University (PhD)
- Occupations: Author; historian; editor; web show host
- Parent: Yuri Glazov (father)
- Website: jamieglazov.com

Jamie Glazov (born 1966) is a Russian-born Canadian conservative author, historian and the managing editor of FrontPage Magazine. He also hosts The Glazov Gang, a web show which regularly features interviews with leading counter-jihad figures.

== Biography ==
Glazov was born in Moscow to professor Yuri Glazov and Marina Glazov, dissidents who fled the Soviet Union for Canada in 1972. He later received a Master of Arts from Dalhousie University in 1990, and a Ph.D. in history with a specialty in Soviet studies from York University in 1997. Later residing in Los Angeles, Glazov has worked for the David Horowitz Freedom Center which owns FrontPage Magazine and The Glazov Gang, and has been described as a "key figure in the transnational counterjihad movement".

In his 2003 book Canadian Policy toward Khrushchev's Soviet Union, published by the McGill–Queen's University Press, Glazov argues that Canada's policy towards the Soviet Union was unique as it sought to contain as well as to accommodate the country. In his 2009 book United in Hate: The Left's Romance with Tyranny and Terror, Glazov analyses segments of the political left's sympathies for radical Islamists. His 2010 book Showdown With Evil features a collection of interviews with thirty leading thinkers which he had conducted since 2004. In his 2018 book Jihadist Psychopath, he claims that jihadists are operating like psychopaths. The same year, he received a notice from Twitter that content on his account about his book violated Pakistan's blasphemy laws, which carries a life sentence and death penalty.

== Bibliography ==
- Obama's True Legacy: How He Transformed America. Republic. 2023. ISBN 978-1645720614.
- Jihadist Psychopath: How He Is Charming, Seducing, and Devouring Us. Post Hill. 2018. ISBN 978-1642930078.
- High Noon for America: The Coming Showdown. Mantua. 2012. ISBN 978-0986941436.
- Showdown With Evil: Our Struggle Against Tyranny and Terror. Mantua. 2010. ISBN 978-0973406559.
- United in Hate: The Left's Romance with Tyranny and Terror. WND Books. 2009. ISBN 978-1935071600.
- Canadian Policy toward Khrushchev's Soviet Union. McGill-Queen's University Press. 2003. ISBN 978-0773522763.
