= Bruce Thornton (classicist) =

American classicist (born 1953)

Bruce S. Thornton (born August 2, 1953) is an American classicist at California State University, Fresno, and research fellow at Stanford University's Hoover Institution.

== Biography ==
Thornton received a Bachelor of Arts in Latin from the University of California at Los Angeles in 1975, and a Ph.D. in comparative literature in 1983. He had studied Greek, Latin, and English literature for his doctorate.

Currently Thornton is research fellow and W. Glenn Campbell and Rita Ricardo-Campbell National Fellow (2009–2010 and 2010–2011) at Stanford University's Hoover Institution. He is a Shillman Journalism Fellow at the David Horowitz Freedom Center.

Thornton has lectured at the Smithsonian Institution in Washington, D.C. He also appeared on ABC's Politically Incorrect with Bill Maher, and is a contributor to the conservative website CaliforniaRepublic.org.

Thornton lives in Fresno with his wife and two sons.

== Work ==
=== History ===
Thornton has described his opinions as opposed to the dominant, mainstream historical tradition about the Enlightenment. He is an admirer of historian Christopher Dawson. He also subscribes to the 'Athens versus Jerusalem' thesis of Leo Strauss, in which the interplay between classical Greek ideologies of rationality and the Judaeo-Christian spiritual philosophies resulted in the creation of Western civilization.

=== Europe ===
Thornton believes that the declining belief in interpersonal ideals such as national pride and in religious ideals such as Christianity has led non-American Westerners to either substitute "political religions" such as communism and fascism into their lives or abandon having moral ideals altogether. This, in his opinion, weakens them against pressure from threats such as increasing immigration to Europe by Muslims that have higher birth rates than native Europeans. He has said, "If all of their goods are material, right, what material good is worth dying for and what material good is worth killing for?" His book Decline and Fall: Europe's Slow Motion Suicide has been described as part of the "Eurabia genre".

== Publications ==
Thornton has published several well-received books.

- Eros: The Myth of Ancient Greek Sexuality (Westview Press, 1997)
- Plagues of the Mind: The New Epidemic of False Knowledge (ISI Books, 1999)
- Greek Ways: How the Greeks Created Western Civilization (Encounter Books, 2000)
- Humanities Handbook (Prentice-Hall, 2000)
- Bonfire of the Humanities. Rescuing the Classics in an Impoverished Age, with John Heath and Victor Davis Hanson (ISI Books, 2001)
- Searching for Joaquin: Myth and History in California (Encounter Books, 2003)
- Decline and Fall: Europe's Slow Motion Suicide (Encounter Books, 2008)
- The Wages of Appeasement: Ancient Athens, Munich, and Obama’s America (Encounter Books, 2011) ISBN 1-59403-519-9
- Democracy's Dangers and Discontents: The Tyranny of the Majority From the Greeks to Obama (Stanford, California: Hoover Institution Press, 2014).

Thornton has written for numerous publications including National Review Online, Heterodoxy, The Washington Times, the Los Angeles Times, Arion, The Jewish Press, The San Francisco Examiner, The American Enterprise, Religious Studies Review, Intercollegiate Review, The American Journal of Philology, City Journal, and FrontPage Magazine.
