= Onward Muslim Soldiers =

Book by Robert Spencer

Onward Muslim Soldiers: How Jihad Still Threatens America and the West
- Author: Robert Spencer
- Language: English
- Publication date: 2003
- Pages: 352
- ISBN: 0-89526-100-6
- OCLC: 892799748
- Followed by: The Politically Incorrect Guide to Islam (and the Crusades)

Onward Muslim Soldiers: How Jihad Still Threatens America and the West, published in October 2003, is a nonfiction book by Robert Spencer. Spencer described the book as an "in-depth study of the doctrine of jihad and how it is exploited today by terrorists to justify what they’re doing and to recruit and motivate new terrorists".

== Description ==
In the book, Spencer discusses issues relating to radical Islam, Jihad, and Islamic terrorism, and claims that these are more serious threats to the non-Muslim world than the media and world leaders accept. Examining current events and sources from the Qur'an, he suggests that jihad, in the sense of physical violence against non-Muslims, is an inherent component of Islam and that Islamic tolerance (the tolerance of Muslims for other religions) is exaggerated by the media. He cites this as the reason for what he claims to be lack of support from the more moderate Islamic community for anti-terrorism measures and for what he claims to be their failure to openly or widely criticise Muslim extremists. He asserts that a direct reading of the Koran and texts that interpret it leads to Islamic extremism.

The book makes a number of controversial claims. These include that mosques in the United States should be monitored more closely to protect national security, and that Muslims living in Western Europe are eroding traditions of 'secularism, free enquiry and open societies'. He also makes the assertion that non-Muslims living in Muslim countries suffer legalised oppression that stems from teachings in the Qur'an.

== Reviews and reception ==
The book was reviewed in a September 2003 article in Human Events. In addition, the book was with eight other books the focus of a January 2004 article in The Middle East Journal entitled: "The Islam Industry and Scholarship", in which the author wrote that the book's author "is very good at finding quotations from the Qur'an or from obscure Muslim clerics to 'prove' the danger of Islam... Spencer states that '[w]hen modern Muslims like Jaffar Umar Thalib [sic] and Usama Bin Ladin declare Jihad, Muslims take them seriously... In present-day studies of Islam, one can easily cite as a source for research 'a writer on a Muslim bulletin board.'

In June 2004, Khalid Hasan wrote in an article in Pakistan's Daily Times that the book was part of the “great Islamic conspiracy.” Hasan says that the book's opinion that Muslims in the United States have failed to “disavow terrorism and condemn the 9/11 attacks with a clear voice” is "not correct by a long shot." Hasan concluded by writing: "How one can fight such ignorance, I am unable to say."

Bat Yeor cites the book approvingly in Eurabia: the Euro-Arab axis, describing it as a "well documented" book that examines what she believes to be calls to Jihad by Muslims in Europe. Sabina Citron says the book provides "deep insights" into the major tenets of political Islam, and says it should be required reading for Western leaders, alongside Hugh Fitzgerald's detailed review of the book, which appeared in Outpost.

It was banned in Malaysia in 2007.

== Formats ==
- Spencer, Robert (2003). Onward Muslim Soldiers (Softcover). Regnery Publishing. ISBN 978-0895261007.
- Spencer, Robert (2003). Onward Muslim Soldiers (Audiobook). Regnery Publishing. ASIN B00D93R1DO.
- Spencer, Robert (2003). Onward Muslim Soldiers (Ebook). Regnery Publishing. ASIN B00C4GTCVQ.
