= Peter Collier (writer) =

American writer and publisher (1939–2019)

- Born: Peter Anthony Dale Collier; June 2, 1939; Los Angeles, California, U.S.
- Died: November 1, 2019 (aged 80); Sacramento, California, U.S.
- Education: University of California, Berkeley
- Spouse: Mary Collier
- Children: 3

Peter Anthony Dale Collier (/ˈkɒliər/; June 2, 1939 – November 1, 2019) was an American writer and publisher. He was the founding publisher of conservative Encounter Books in California and held that position from 1998 until he resigned in 2005. The company moved from San Francisco to New York City, and Collier was replaced as publisher by Roger Kimball.

With David Horowitz, Collier wrote many books that made The New York Times Best Seller list and was described by the New York Times Book Review as "the premier biographer of American dynastic tragedy." His book Medal of Honor: Profiles of Valor Beyond the Call of Duty (2003) profiled living recipients of the Medal.

== Biography ==
Collier was born in Hollywood, Los Angeles, California and attended Hollywood Progressive School. He grew up in Burbank and attended the University of California, Berkeley, earning a B.A. in English in 1961 and a M.A. in 1963. He served as a civil rights activist in the South in 1964.

Returning to California, Collier taught Freshman English at UC Berkeley from 1964 to 1969 and again as a Visiting Writer from 1977 to 1981. He also taught at UC Santa Cruz and at Miles College in Birmingham, Alabama. Collier is a fellow of the National Endowment of the Arts (1980). He lectured abroad for the United States Information Service in 1980, 1987, and 1998.

Collier was teaching at the University of California, Berkeley, in 1966 when he became an editor at radical Leftist Ramparts magazine, the splashy, four-color publication that was influential in transmitting New Left ideas into the mainstream. Collier wrote about the Black Panthers, the American Indian Movement and other radical organizations for Ramparts. He edited Ramparts until 1972.

As the Vietnam War came to an end, he and fellow Ramparts writer David Horowitz became disillusioned when the New Left turned a blind eye to the atrocities committed by the communist victors in Southeast Asia—the tiger cages and boat people in South Vietnam, the genocide in Cambodia. They began a slow motion political transition that led them away from the Left and ultimately made them, in their own term, "second thoughters" engaged in ongoing political combat with their former comrades. Collier and Horowitz traveled to Nicaragua in 1987 at the invitation of the State Department to encourage the "civic resistance" against the Sandinistas. The same year they organized a "Second Thoughts Convention" in Washington D.C. Their book about leaving the Left and becoming its enemies, Destructive Generation (1989), was compared to Whittaker Chambers' Witness.

He served as a co-author with Horowitz on several books on American history and political science. Their biographies The Rockefellers: An American Dynasty (1976) and The Kennedys: An American Drama (1984) both made the New York Times Best Seller list. The Kennedys also made the year-end New York Times notable books of the year list in 1984. Later, they co-wrote works critical of the left and of leftists, including The Anti-Chomsky Reader (2004). He was a co-founder with Horowitz of the Center for the Study of Popular Culture.

Collier lived in Nevada City, California. His son Nick Collier is a creative director, digital strategist, and entrepreneur.

Collier died from acute myeloid leukemia on November 1, 2019, at age 80, in a hospital in Sacramento, California.

== Works ==
=== Co-authored with David Horowitz ===
External videos
- Booknotes interview with Collier on The Roosevelts, August 7, 1994, C-SPAN

- The Rockefellers: An American Dynasty Summit Books (1976) ISBN 978-0671677886
- The Kennedys: An American Drama Encounter Books (1984) ISBN 1893554317
- The Fords: An American Epic Encounter Books (1987) ISBN 1893554325
- Destructive Generation Encounter Books (1989) ISBN 1594030820
- Deconstructing the Left: From Vietnam to the Clinton Era ISBN 978-0819183156
- The Roosevelts: An American Saga Simon & Schuster (1994) ISBN 978-0684801407
- The Heterodoxy Handbook: How to Survive the PC Campus (editor and contributor) Regnery Publishing (1994) ISBN 978-0895267313
- The Race Card: White Guilt, Black Resentment, and the Assault on Truth and Justice (editor and contributor) Prima Lifestyles (1997) ISBN 978-0761509424
- The Anti-Chomsky Reader Encounter Books (2004) ISBN 978-1893554979

=== Novels ===
- Downriver Dell Pub Co (1978) ISBN 978-0440118305
- Things in Glocca Morra Encounter (2021)

=== Non-fiction ===
External videos
- After Words interview with Collier on Political Woman, July 14, 2012, C-SPAN

- When Shall They Rest? The Cherokees' Long Struggle with America Dell Publishing (1975) ISBN 978-0440993414
- Second Thoughts: Former Radicals Look Back at the Sixties (editor) Madison Books (1989) ISBN 978-0819171474
- Second Thoughts About Race in America (editor) Madison Books (1991) ISBN 978-0819182432
- The Fondas: A Hollywood Dynasty Berkley Books (1992) ISBN 978-0425131848
- Medal of Honor: Portraits of Valor Beyond the Call of Duty Book and Multimedia DVD with photography by Nick Del Calzo Artis (2003) ISBN 1579653146
- Political Woman: The Big Little Life of Jeane Kirkpatrick Encounter Books (2012) ISBN 978-1594036040
- Wings of Valor: Honoring America's Fighter Aces with photography by Nick del Calzo. Naval Institute Press (2016)

=== Other ===
- The King's Giraffe children's tale with Mary Jo Collier. Stephane Poulin (Illustrator) Simon & Schuster Books (1996) ISBN 978-0689806797
- Collier's short fiction has appeared in Triquarterly, Canto, the Seattle Review, and the Missouri Review.
