= Mary R. Habeck =

American international relations scholar

Mary R. Habeck (born 1963) is an American scholar of international relations. She received her PhD in history from Yale University and is currently Associate Professor of Strategic Studies at the Johns Hopkins University.

Fluent in Russian, she has collaborated with Ronald Radosh.

== Books ==
- Knowing the Enemy: Jihadist Ideology and the War on Terror (2006) ISBN 978-0-300-11306-8
- Storm of Steel: The Development of Armor Doctrine in Germany and the Soviet Union, 1919-1939 (2003) ISBN 978-0-8014-4074-8
- Spain Betrayed: The Soviet Union in the Spanish Civil War, co-editor (2001) ISBN 978-0-300-08981-3
- The Great War and the Twentieth Century, co-editor (2000) ISBN 978-0-300-08154-1
