= David Horowitz =

American conservative writer and activist (1939–2025)

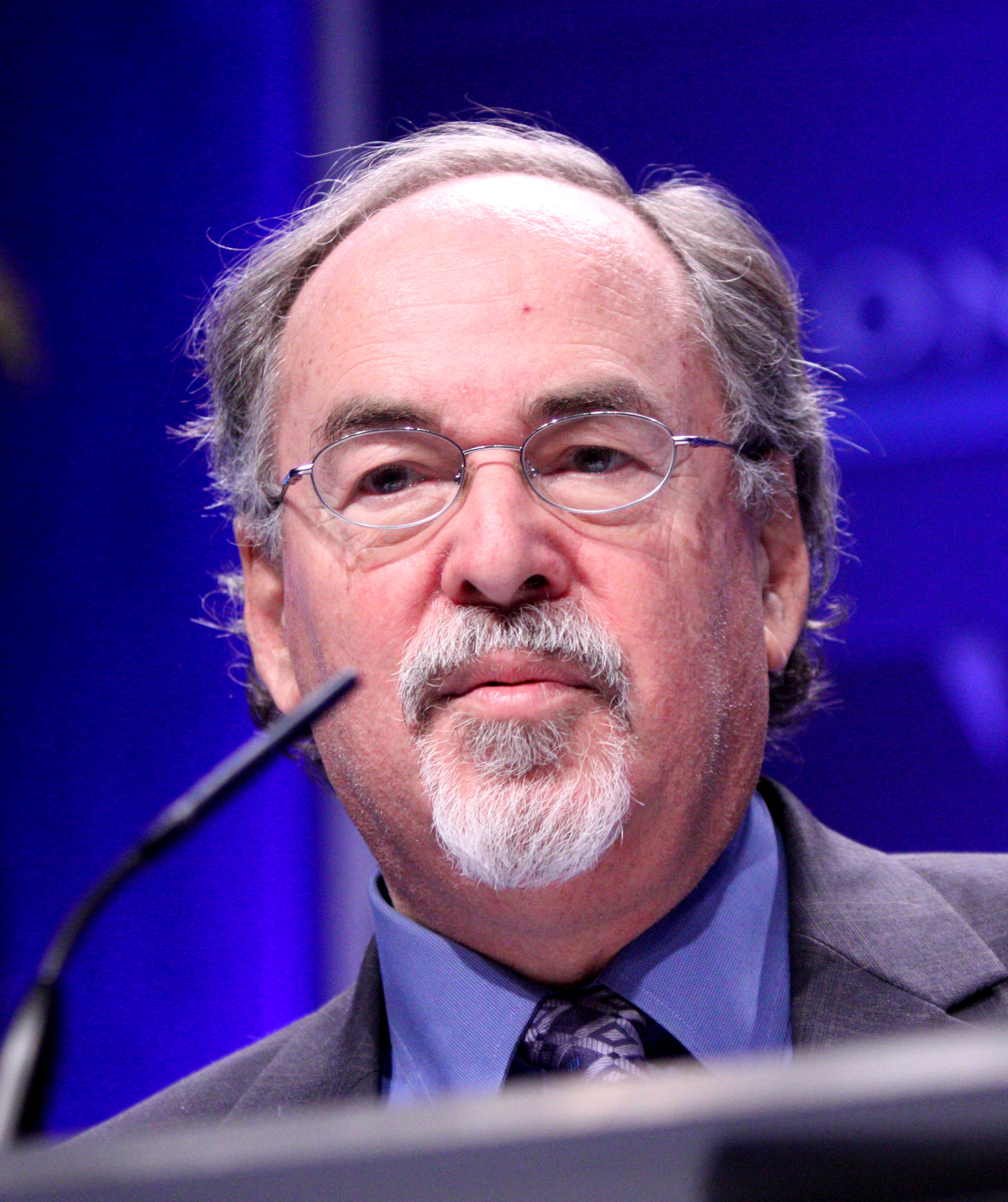
- Horowitz in 2011
- Born: David Joel Horowitz; January 10, 1939; New York City, U.S.
- Died: April 29, 2025 (aged 86); Parker, Colorado, U.S.
- Education: Columbia University (BA); University of California, Berkeley (MA)
- Occupations: Conservative activist and writer
- Spouses: Elissa Krauthamer (m. 1959; div. 1978) Sam Moorman (m. 1984; div. 1985) Shay Marlowe (m. 1990; div. 1995) April Mullvain (m. 1998)
- Children: 4, including Ben

David Joel Horowitz (January 10, 1939 – April 29, 2025) was an American conservative writer and activist. He co-founded the David Horowitz Freedom Center (DHFC), was editor of the Center's website FrontPage Magazine, and director of Discover the Networks, a website that tracks individuals and groups on the political left. Horowitz also founded the organization Students for Academic Freedom.

Horowitz wrote several books with author Peter Collier, including four on prominent 20th-century American families. He and Collier collaborated on books about cultural criticism. Horowitz worked as a columnist for Salon.

From 1956 to 1975, Horowitz was an outspoken adherent of the New Left. He later rejected progressive ideas and became a defender of neoconservatism. Horowitz recounted his ideological journey in a series of retrospective books, culminating with his 1996 memoir Radical Son: A Generational Odyssey.

== Early life and education ==
Born on January 10, 1939 in the Forest Hills neighborhood of Queens, a borough of New York City, Horowitz was the son of Jewish high school teachers Phil and Blanche Horowitz. His father taught English and his mother taught stenography. His mother's family emigrated from Imperial Russia in the mid-19th century, and his father's family left Russia in 1905 during a time of anti-Jewish pogroms. Horowitz's paternal grandfather lived in Mozir, a city in modern Belarus, prior to leaving for the U.S. In 1940, the family moved to the Long Island City section of Queens.

During years of labor organizing and the Great Depression, Phil and Blanche Horowitz were long-standing members of the Communist Party of the United States of America and strong supporters of Joseph Stalin. They left the party after Nikita Khrushchev published his report in 1956 about Stalin's crimes and his terrorism against the Soviet population.

Horowitz received a Bachelor of Arts from Columbia University in 1959, majoring in English, and a master's degree in English literature at University of California, Berkeley in 1961.

== Career ==
=== New Left ===
After completing his graduate degree, Horowitz lived in London during the mid-1960s and worked for the Bertrand Russell Peace Foundation. He identified as a Marxist intellectual.

In 1966, Ralph Schoenman persuaded Bertrand Russell to convene his war crimes tribunal to judge United States involvement in the Vietnam War. Horowitz would write three decades later that he had political reservations about the tribunal and did not take part. He described the tribunal's judges as formidable, world-famous and radical. They included Isaac Deutscher, Jean-Paul Sartre, Stokely Carmichael, Simone de Beauvoir, Vladimir Dedijer and James Baldwin. In January 1966, Horowitz, along with members of the Trotskyist International Marxist Group, formed the Vietnam Solidarity Campaign. The Vietnam Solidarity Campaign organized a series of protests in London against British support for the Vietnam War.

While in London, Horowitz became a close friend of Deutscher, and wrote a biography of him. Horowitz wrote The Free World Colossus: A Critique of American Foreign Policy in the Cold War. In January 1968, Horowitz returned to the United States, where he became co-editor of the New Left magazine Ramparts, settling in northern California.

During the early 1970s, Horowitz developed a close friendship with Huey P. Newton, founder of the Black Panther Party. Horowitz later portrayed Newton as equal parts gangster, terrorist, intellectual and media celebrity. As part of their work together, Horowitz helped raise money for, and assisted the Panthers with, the running of a school for poor children in Oakland. He recommended that Newton hire Betty Van Patter as bookkeeper; she was then working for Ramparts. In December 1974, Van Patter's battered, decomposed body was found on a beach in San Francisco Bay; she had been murdered. It is widely believed that the Panthers were responsible for her murder, a belief also held by Horowitz.

In 1976, Horowitz was a "founding sponsor" of James Weinstein's magazine In These Times.

=== Rightward evolution ===
Following this period, Horowitz rejected Marx and socialism, but kept quiet about his changing politics for nearly a decade.

In early 1985, Horowitz and Collier, who also became a political conservative, wrote an article for The Washington Post Magazine titled "Lefties for Reagan", later retitled as "Goodbye to All That". The article explained their change of views and recent decision to vote for a second term for Republican President Ronald Reagan. In 1986, Horowitz published "Why I Am No Longer a Leftist" in The Village Voice.

In 1987, Horowitz co-hosted a "Second Thoughts Conference" in Washington, D.C., described by Sidney Blumenthal in The Washington Post as his "coming out" as a conservative.

External videos
- David Horowitz delivers a speech to the Ashland University College Republicans at the Ashbrook Center on November 11, 1991.

In May 1989, Horowitz, Ronald Radosh, and Collier attended a conference in Kraków calling for the end of Communism. After marching with Polish dissidents in an anti-regime protest, Horowitz spoke about his changing thoughts and why he believed that socialism could not create their future. He said his dream was for the people of Poland to be free.

In 1992, Horowitz and Collier founded Heterodoxy, a monthly magazine focused on exposing what it described as excessive political correctness on United States college and university campuses. It was "meant to have the feel of a samizdat publication inside the gulag of the PC [politically correct] university". The tabloid was directed at university students, whom Horowitz viewed as indoctrinated by the entrenched Left. In Radical Son, he wrote that universities were no longer effective in presenting both sides of political arguments. He stated that left-wing professors had created an atmosphere of political "terror" on campuses.

In 2005, Horowitz launched Discover the Networks.

Horowitz appeared in Occupy Unmasked, a 2012 documentary portraying the Occupy Wall Street movement as a sinister organization formed to violently destroy the American government.

=== Academic Bill of Rights ===
In the early 21st century, Horowitz concentrated on issues of academic freedom, attempting to protect conservative viewpoints. He, Eli Lehrer and Andrew Jones published a pamphlet, "Political Bias in the Administrations and Faculties of 32 Elite Colleges and Universities" (2004), in which they find the ratio of Democrats to Republicans at 32 schools to be more than 10 to 1. Horowitz's book, The Professors: The 101 Most Dangerous Academics in America (2006), criticized individual professors for, as he alleges, engaging in indoctrination rather than a disinterested pursuit of knowledge.

Horowitz published an Academic Bill of Rights (ABR), which he proposes to eliminate political bias in university hiring and grading. He says conservatives, and particularly Republican Party members, are systematically excluded from faculties, citing statistical studies on faculty party affiliation. In 2004 the Georgia General Assembly passed a resolution on a 41–5 vote to adopt a version of the ABR for state educational institutions. In Pennsylvania, the House of Representatives created a special legislative committee to investigate issues of academic freedom, including whether students who hold unpopular views need more protection.

=== David Horowitz Freedom Center ===
In 1998 Horowitz and Peter Collier founded the David Horowitz Freedom Center. Politico states that Horowitz's activities and DHFC are funded in part by Aubrey and Joyce Chernick and The Bradley Foundation. Politico stated that during 2008–2010, "the lion's share of the $920,000 it [DHFC] provided over the past three years to Jihad Watch came from [Joyce] Chernick". Between July 2000 and February 2006 the freedom center provided a total of $43,000 in funding for 25 trips taken by Republican senators and representatives including Mike Pence, Mitch McConnell, Bob Barr, Fred Thompson and others. In 2015, Horowitz made $583,000 (~$772,661 in 2025) from the organization.

Horowitz was the editor of the Center's website FrontPage Magazine. It has been described by scholars and writers as right-wing, far-right, Islamophobic, and anti-Islam.

== Political positions ==
Horowitz was a former Marxist, but was later described as being conservative. He has described himself as "a defender of gays and 'alternative lifestyles', a moderate on abortion, and a civil rights activist".

Horowitz wrote against United States intervention in the Kosovo War, arguing that it was unnecessary and harmful to United States interests, but supported the interventionist foreign policy associated with the Bush Doctrine, including the 2003 invasion of Iraq. He also wrote critically of libertarian anti-war views.

Horowitz opposed Barack Obama, illegal immigration, gun control, and Islam. He endorsed Presidents Ronald Reagan, George W. Bush, and Donald Trump.

=== Economics ===
In his book Empire and Revolution (1969), Horowitz centered and adapted Bolshevik concepts in his historical analysis up to that point. Critical of Joseph Stalin, Kenneth Boulding termed him a Marxist revisionist, who was comparable to Paul Sweezy and "curiously nationalistic". U.S. policymakers, he claimed, failed to apply Keynesian economics to internal needs and rather sought expansion of the market economy, resulting in U.S. foreign intervention. His dialectical materialist view considered nations that underwent bourgeois revolution before the 19th-century, like the U.S., as needing to undergo a stage of capitalism. Contrasting the development of the Soviet Union, Cuba, and China to the Alliance for Progress, he affirmed the need for socialist revolution.

In 1979, he asserted in The Nation article "A Disenchanted Radical" that state socialism was liable to all that he had attributed to capitalism, including "exploitation, imperialism, pollution, misery, economic waste, national hatred and national oppression." "…inefficiency, lack of economic incentives, and, above all, the unrestricted role of the omnipotent bureaucracy…", he clarified, were unique drawbacks of socialism. Following his political transition, he avidly opposed economic redistribution, claiming it a threat to individual freedom. By 2013, he rhetorically categorized anyone in favor as having a "communist mentality".

=== Race ===
During his time in the New Left, Horowitz supported the civil rights movement. In the 1970s, he came to believe that the Black Panthers were involved in the death of his friend Betty Van Patter, souring the relationship between Horowitz and the Black Panthers.

In a 2001 column in Salon he described his opposition to reparations for slavery, calling it racism against blacks, as it defined them only in terms of their descent from slaves. He argued that applying labels like "descendants of slaves" to blacks was damaging and would serve to segregate them from mainstream society. In the same year during Black History Month, Horowitz attempted to purchase advertising space in several American university student publications to express his opposition to reparations. Many student papers refused to sell him ad space; at some schools, papers that carried his ads were stolen or destroyed. Joan Walsh said the furor had given Horowitz an overwhelming amount of free publicity.

In 2018, Horowitz attracted many critical comments by attacking the Equal Justice Initiative's new National Memorial for Peace and Justice, calling it "a real racist project" showing "anti-white racism". "Lynchings were bad but they weren't mainly about whites yanking blacks off the streets and stringing them up". "A third of the victims of lynchings were white. How many of them do you think this memorial features [sic]."

=== Islam ===
Horowitz was critical of Palestinians, claiming that their goal is to wipe out Jews from the Middle East. "No people have shown themselves as so morally sick as the Palestinians," he said at Brooklyn College in 2011.

Horowitz published a 2007 piece in the Columbia University student newspaper, saying that, according to public opinion polls, "150 million out of 750 million Muslims support a holy war against Christians, Jews, and other Muslims." Speaking at the University of Massachusetts Amherst in February 2010, Horowitz compared Islamists to Nazis, saying: "Islamists are worse than the Nazis, because even the Nazis did not tell the world that they want to exterminate the Jews."

Horowitz created a campaign for what he called "Islamo-Fascism Awareness Week" in parody of multicultural awareness activities. He helped arrange for leading critics of radical Islam to speak at more than a hundred college campuses in October 2007. As a speaker, he was repeatedly met with intense hostility.

In 2008, while speaking at University of California, Santa Barbara (UCSB), Horowitz criticized Arab culture, saying that it was rife with antisemitism. He referred to the Palestinian keffiyeh, a traditional Arab head covering that became associated with PLO leader Yasser Arafat, as a “symbol of terrorism”. In response, UCSB professor Walid Afifi said that Horowitz was "preaching hate" and smearing Arab culture.

Horowitz used university student publications and lectures at universities as venues for publishing controversial advertisements or lecturing on issues related to Islamic student and other organizations. In April 2008, DHFC advertised in the Daily Nexus, the UCSB school newspaper, saying that the Muslim Students' Association (MSA) had links with the Muslim Brotherhood, Al-Qaeda, and Hamas. The next month, Horowitz, speaking at UCSB, said that MSA supports "a second Holocaust of the Jews". The MSA responded that they were a peaceful organization and not a political group. The MSA's faculty adviser said the group had "been involved in interfaith activities with Jewish student groups, and they've been involved in charity work for national disaster relief." Horowitz ran the ad in The GW Hatchet, the student newspaper of George Washington University in Washington, D.C. Jake Sherman, the Hatchet's editor-in-chief, said claims the MSA was radical were "ludicrous".

He became an early user of the question "Do you condemn Hamas?" which he directed to a Muslim student at the University of California, San Diego (UCSD) on May 11, 2010. The student was a member of UCSD's Muslim Student Association, then holding Justice in Palestine Week, which students said Horowitz had referred to as "Hitler Youth Week". In 2017, Horowitz's Freedom Center targeted pro-Palestinian professors and students.

In a 2011 review of anti-Islamic activists in the US, the Southern Poverty Law Center identified Horowitz as one of ten people in the United States' "Anti-Muslim Inner Circle". He was also described as "the godfather of the anti-Muslim movement", and as "possibly the number one counter-jihad personality", financing many other groups through his organization.

In 2017 Horowitz's center put up posters on university campuses naming students and professors who support Palestinian rights, with the names taken from the anonymous doxxing group Canary Mission.

== Responses to Horowitz's views ==
Some Horowitz accounts of U.S. colleges and universities as bastions of liberal indoctrination have been disputed. For example, Horowitz alleged that a University of Northern Colorado student received a failing grade on a final exam for refusing to write an essay arguing that George W. Bush is a war criminal. A spokeswoman for the university said that the test question was not as described by Horowitz and that there were nonpolitical reasons for the grade, which was not an F. Horowitz identified the professor as Robert Dunkley, an assistant professor of criminal justice at Northern Colorado. Dunkley said Horowitz made him an example of "liberal bias" in academia and yet, "Dunkley said that he comes from a Republican family, is a registered Republican and considers himself politically independent, taking pride in never having voted a straight party ticket".

In another instance, Horowitz said a Pennsylvania State University biology professor showed his students the film Fahrenheit 9/11 just before the 2004 election in an attempt to influence their votes. Pressed by Inside Higher Ed, Horowitz said that the claim was hearsay from a "legislative staffer" and that he had no proof it happened.

Horowitz's books, particularly The Professors: The 101 Most Dangerous Academics in America, were criticized by scholars such as Todd Gitlin. The group Free Exchange on Campus issued a 50-page report in May 2006 in which they take issue with many of the books' assertions: they identify specific factual errors, unsubstantiated assertions and quotations that appear to be either in error or taken out of context.

Chip Berlet, writing for the Southern Poverty Law Center (SPLC), accused Horowitz's Center for the Study of Popular Culture of being one of 17 "right-wing foundations and think tanks support[ing] efforts to make bigoted and discredited ideas respectable." Berlet accused Horowitz of blaming slavery on "black Africans ... abetted by dark-skinned Arabs" and of "attack[ing] minority 'demands for special treatment' as 'only necessary because some blacks can't seem to locate the ladder of opportunity within reach of others".

== Personal life ==
Horowitz was married four times. He married Elissa Krauthamer, in a Yonkers, New York, synagogue on June 14, 1959. They had four children together: Jonathan Daniel, Ben, Sarah Rose (deceased) and Anne. Sarah died in March 2008 at age 44 from Turner syndrome-related heart complications. She had been a teacher, writer and human rights activist. She is the subject of Horowitz's 2009 book, A Cracking of the Heart.

Horowitz's son, Ben, is a technology entrepreneur, investor, and co-founder, along with Marc Andreessen, of the venture capital firm Andreessen Horowitz.

Horowitz's second marriage in 1984, to Sam Moorman, ended in divorce within less than a year. On June 24, 1990, Horowitz married Shay Marlowe in an Orthodox Jewish ceremony. They divorced.

Horowitz's fourth and final marriage was to April Mullvain. The couple met in the mid-1990s, and married two years later. He and April lived in horse country northwest of Los Angeles, where she rescues abused horses and provides equine educational programs.

Horowitz, in 2015, described himself as an agnostic.

Horowitz died from cancer at his home in Parker, Colorado, on April 29, 2025, at the age of 86.

== Works ==
=== Books ===
- Student. (Ballantine, 1962) OCLC 1968166
- Shakespeare: An Existential View. (Tavistock, 1965) OCLC 8545094
- The Free World Colossus: A Critique of American Foreign Policy in the Cold War. Hill & Wang (1965, revised edition 1971) ISBN 978-0-8090-0107-1 OCLC 122073
- From Yalta to Vietnam: American Foreign Policy in the Cold War. Penguin (1967) ISBN 978-0-14-021147-4 OCLC 304200
- Containment and Revolution. Beacon Press (1968)
- Marx and Modern Economics. Modern Reader Paperbacks (1968) OCLC 59796224
- Corporations and the Cold War. Monthly Review Press (1969) OCLC 3715379
- Empire and Revolution: A Radical Interpretation of Contemporary History. Random House (1969) OCLC 759274
- Universities and the Ruling Class: How Wealth Puts Knowledge in its Pocket. Bay Area Radical Education Project (1969)

Originally published in Ramparts as "Billion Dollar Brains" (May 1969) and "Sinews of Empire" (August 1969).

- Isaac Deutscher: The Man and His Work. Macdonald and Company (1971) ISBN 978-0-356-03156-9 OCLC 281670
- Radical Sociology: An Introduction. Canfield Press (1971) ISBN 978-0-06-383865-9 OCLC 263656516
- Counterculture and Revolution, with Craig Pyes (Random House, 1972) ISBN 978-0-394-31553-9 OCLC 215350
- The Fate of Midas, and other Essays. Ramparts Press (1973) ISBN 978-0-87867-032-1 OCLC 730559
- The Rockefellers: An American Dynasty, with Peter Collier. Summit Books (1976) ISBN 978-0-671-67445-8 OCLC 18746502
- The First Frontier: The Indian Wars and America's Origins, 1607–1776. Simon & Schuster (1978) ISBN 978-0-671-22534-6 OCLC 4194194
- The Kennedys: An American Drama, with Peter Collier. Encounter Books (1984) ISBN 978-0-671-44793-9 OCLC 10711800
- The Fords: An American Epic, with Peter Collier. Encounter Books (1987) ISBN 978-0-671-54093-7 OCLC 16844914
- Destructive Generation: Second Thoughts about the 60s, with Peter Collier. Summit Books (1989) ISBN 978-0-671-66752-8 OCLC 18870005
- Second Thoughts about Race in America, with Peter Collier (Madison Books, 1991) ISBN 978-0-8191-8243-2 OCLC 24246309
- Deconstructing the Left: From Vietnam to the Persian Gulf. (Second Thoughts Books, 1991) ISBN 978-0-8191-8315-6 OCLC 24067317
- The Roosevelts: An American Saga with Peter Collier. Simon & Schuster (1994) ISBN 978-0-233-98927-3 OCLC 33664990
- Radical Son: A Generational Odyssey. Simon & Schuster (1996) ISBN 978-0-684-84005-5 OCLC 38928326
- The Politics of Bad Faith: The Radical Assault on America's Future. Free Press (1998) ISBN 978-0-684-85679-7 OCLC 43650827
- Sex, Lies and Vast Conspiracies. (Second Thoughts Books, 1998) ISBN 978-1-886442-14-6
- Hating Whitey and Other Progressive Causes. Spence Publishing Co. (1999) ISBN 978-1-890626-21-1 OCLC 41981890
- Uncivil Wars: The Controversy Over Reparations for Slavery. (Encounter Books, 2002) ISBN 978-1-893554-44-3 OCLC 47849447
- How to Beat the Democrats and Other Subversive Ideas. (Spence Publishing, 2002) ISBN 978-1-890626-41-9 OCLC 50246759
- Left Illusions: An Intellectual Odyssey. (Spence Publishing, 2003) ISBN 978-1-890626-56-3
- The Art of Political War and Other Radical Pursuits. (Spence Publishing, 2004) ISBN 978-1-890626-28-0 OCLC 44026293
- The Anti-Chomsky Reader with Peter Collier. Encounter Books (2004) ISBN 978-1-893554-97-9
- Unholy Alliance: Radical Islam and the American Left. Regnery Publishing (2004) ISBN 978-0-89526-026-0 OCLC 64385505
- The End of Time. (Encounter, 2005) ISBN 978-1-59403-129-8 OCLC 60378448
- The Professors: The 101 Most Dangerous Academics in America. (Regnery, 2006) ISBN 978-1-59698-525-4 OCLC 180272939
- Indoctrination U: The Left's War Against Academic Freedom. (Encounter, 2007) ISBN 978-1-59403-367-4 OCLC 609854164
- Party of Defeat: How Democrats and Radicals Undermined America’s War on Terror Before and After 9/11, with Ben Johnson. (Spence Publishing, 2008) ISBN 978-1-890626-74-7 OCLC 224508933
- One Party Classroom: How Radical Professors at America's Top Colleges Indoctrinate Students and Undermine Our Democracy. (Crown Forum, 2009) ISBN 978-0-307-45255-9 OCLC 232980253
- A Cracking of the Heart. (Regnery, 2009) ISBN 978-1-59698-103-4 OCLC 317453616
- Reforming Our Universities: The Campaign For An Academic Bill Of Rights. (Regnery, 2010) ISBN 978-1-59698-157-7 OCLC 694142894
- A Point in Time : The Search for Redemption in This Life and the Next. (Regnery, 2011) ISBN 978-1-59698-295-6 OCLC 759159586
- Radicals: Portraits of a Destructive Passion. (Regnery, 2012) ISBN 978-1-62157-006-6 OCLC 812193305
- The New Leviathan: How the Left-Wing Money-Machine Shapes American Politics and Threatens America's Future. (2012) ISBN 978-0-307-71645-3 OCLC 754714308
- The Black Book of the American Left. Volume 1: My Life and Times. (David Horowitz Freedom Center, 2013) ISBN 978-1-59403-695-8 OCLC 863201404
- The Black Book of the American Left. Volume 2: Progressives. (David Horowitz Freedom Center, 2014) ISBN 978-1-886442-95-5
- The Black Book of the American Left. Volume 3: The Great Betrayal. (David Horowitz Freedom Center, 2014) ISBN 978-1-886442-96-2
- Take No Prisoners: The Battle Plan for Defeating the Left. (Regnery, 2014) ISBN 978-1-62157-261-9 OCLC 884012884
- You're Going to be Dead One Day: A Love Story. (Regnery, 2015) ISBN 978-1-62157-433-0 OCLC 907291786
- The Black Book of the American Left. Volume 4: Islamo-Fascism and the War Against the Jews. (David Horowitz Freedom Center, 2015) ISBN 978-1-941262-00-9
- The Black Book of the American Left. Volume 5: Culture Wars. (David Horowitz Freedom Center, 2015) ISBN 978-1-941262-01-6
- The Black Book of the American Left. Volume 6: Progressive Racism. (David Horowitz Freedom Center, 2016) ISBN 978-1-59403-859-4
- The Black Book of the American Left. Volume 7: The Left in Power. (David Horowitz Freedom Center, 2016) ISBN 978-1-941262-03-0
- The Black Book of the American Left. Volume 8: The Left in the University. (David Horowitz Freedom Center, 2017) ISBN 978-1-941262-04-7
- The Shadow Party: How George Soros, Hillary Clinton, and Sixties Radicals Seized Control of the Democratic Party. Humanix Books (2017) ISBN 978-1-59555-103-0
- Big Agenda: President Trump's Plan to Save America. (Humanix Books, 2017) ISBN 978-1-63006-087-9
- The Black Book of the American Left. Volume 9: Ruling Ideas (David Horowitz Freedom Center, 2018) ISBN 978-1-941262-08-5
- Dark Agenda: The War to Destroy Christian America. (Humanix, 2018) ISBN 978-1-63006-114-2
- Mortality and Faith: Reflections on a Journey through Time. (Regnery, 2019) ISBN 978-1-62157-813-0
- BLITZ: Trump Will Smash the Left and Win. (Humanix Books, 2020) ISBN 978-1-63006-138-8
- The Enemy Within: How a Totalitarian Movement Is Destroying America. (Regnery, 2021) ISBN 978-1-68451-054-2
- I Can't Breathe: How a Racial Hoax Is Killing America. (Regnery, 2021) ISBN 978-1-68451-218-8
- Final Battle: The Next Election Could Be the Last. (Humanix, 2023) ISBN 978-1-63006-224-8
- The Radical Mind: The Destructive Plans of the Woke Left. (Humanix, 2024) ISBN 978-1-63006-267-5
- America Betrayed: How a Christian Monk Created America and Why the Left Is Determined to Destroy Her (Final Battle Books, 2024) ISBN 978-1-51078-147-4

=== Articles ===
- Oglesby, Carl, and David Horowitz. "In Defense of Paranoia: An Exchange Between Carl Oglesby and David Horowitz". Ramparts (March 1975), pp. 15–20.
