= Protecting Human Rights of Children and Women =

Book by Majid Rafizadeh

- Author: Majid Rafizadeh
- Subject: Islam, human rights, women, democracy, feminism, freedom, human rights
- Publisher: The West Wing House
- Publication date: 2015
- Pages: 222

Protecting Human Rights of Children and Women is a book written by Majid Rafizadeh, an American political scientist, public speaker, human rights activist, Harvard University scholar and TV commentator who grew up in Iran and Syria. Published in 2015 by The West Wing House, it has been picked and profiled by several national and international outlets, including the BBC, Fars News Agency, and Frontpage Magazine.

In his book, Rafizadeh illustrates the intersection between the religion of Islam and child marriage. It describes the connections between patriarchal and male-dominated systems, as well as the regional conflict, Islam, and the Syrian Civil War. He addresses the social, political, and cultural history of Islam from sociopolitical and psychological perspectives.
