= Glazovsky =

Glazovsky (masculine), Glazovskaya (feminine), or Glazovskoye (neuter) may refer to:

- Glazovsky District, a district of the Udmurt Republic, Russia
- Glazovsky (rural locality), a rural locality (a pochinok) in Yukamensky District of the Udmurt Republic, Russia
