= Yurij Yakovlevitch Glazov =

Russian-Canadian Indologist (1929–1998)

Yurij Yakovlevitch Glazov (1929–1998), sometimes cited as J. J. Glazov, was a Russian-Canadian Indologist known for his studies in Tamil and Malayalam languages and classical literature.

== Biography ==
He received his doctorate degree in 1962 for his studies on the classical Tamil language with a focus on Tirukkural. He worked at Moscow State University, and published many articles on Tamil and Malayalam literature. He collaborated with other Indologists such as M. Andronov, S. Rudin, Kamil Zvelebil, Chandra Shekhar and A Krishnamurti. He is credited with the first translations of the Tamil texts Tirukkural and the Cilappatikaram into the Russian language.

In a review of linguistic studies on Tamil literature, the Czech scholar of Tamil literature Kamil Zvelebil wrote, Glazov published a "number of very important papers where he treated systematically and in detail the morphophonology and morphology of classical literary Tamil; all his papers are characterized by meticulous attention to details and sound methodological approach".

As a Soviet dissident facing constant harassment by the KGB by 1972, he moved to Halifax, Nova Scotia in 1975, where he became Professor in the Department of Russian Studies at Dalhousie University until 1995. Dalhousie University has since 2006 presented an annual Yuri Glazov Memorial Award in his honour.

His son Jamie Glazov is a writer based in the United States.

== Publications ==
Glazov's Indology publications included:

- Yazyk Malayalam (The Malayalam Language), Moscow, 1961
- Thirukkural (in Russian), Tr. from Tamil, 1963, 156 p.
- Morfiemnyj sostav tamiljskogo klassichieskogo yazyka (Morpheme inventory of Classical Tamil), 'Narody Azii i Afriki', 3, 1962, p. 139-152.
- Mprfofoniemika i sintaktofoniemika klassichiesskogo tamiljskogo yaz (Morphophonemics and Sintactophonemics of the Classical Tamil), 'Voprosy Yazykoznaniya', No. 3, 1964, p. 88-98.
- Sochietaye'mostj i poriadok morfem imiennogo slovoobrazovaniya i slo-voizmienieniya Tirukkurala, KSINA, 1964, 62, p. 79-95.
- Morftemy aorista v drievnietamiljskom yazykie (The Morphemes of Aorist in Ancient Tamil), NKYIPTN, p. 28-29.
- K probliemie tipologichieskogo shodstva dravidiyskih i tjurkskih yazy¬kov (On the problem of typological affinity between Dravidian and Turkish languages), 'Lingvistichieskaya tipologiya i vostochnyje yazyki' (LTVY), 1965, p. 205-212.
- Glagoljnaya forma na -are v kannada (Verbal construction with -are in Kannada), KSINA, 1964, No. 68, pp. 31–39.
