= The Professors: The 101 Most Dangerous Academics in America =

2006 book by David Horowitz

- Author: David Horowitz
- Language: English
- Publisher: Regnery Publishing
- Publication date: 2006
- Publication place: United States
- Media type: Print (Hardcover and Paperback)
- Pages: 450
- ISBN: 0-89526-003-4
- OCLC: 63171004
- Dewey Decimal: 378.1/2 22
- LC Class: LB2331.72 .H67 2006

The Professors: The 101 Most Dangerous Academics in America is a 2006 book by conservative American author and policy advocate David Horowitz. Contending that many academics in American colleges hold anti-American perspectives, Horowitz lists one hundred examples who he believes are sympathetic to terrorists and non-democratic governments.

== Argument ==
The book was named as the most specific manifestation of Horowitz’s campaign against what he called "the insularity of a predominantly left-wing academic environment" where views regarded as politically correct by the radical left outweigh academic achievement. Colonized by the left, he argues, a significant part of the university system has been transformed to serve the leftist political ends.

The book is an alphabetical list of Professors dwelling on each Professor's issues. Horowitz denied that his intention was to compose a list but he was accused of creating a blacklist. Most popular of the concerned issues include regrets of the USSR’s unfulfilled promise, justifications of the September 11 attacks, and calls for Israel’s destruction. The listed Academics represent heterogeneous disciplines, such as postmodernism, postcolonialism, ethnic studies, women studies, and studies related to social justice and peace, but their convictions on the above issues nearly identically converge and form narrow, one-sided political agendas expressed with grim determination.

Less common issues include advocating global jihad, justifications of Saddam's invasion of Kuwait, calls to kill gringo, descriptions of whites as inferior to blacks, Americans as innate racists and “little Eichmanns,” religious Americans as "moral retards," Jews as "race of skunks," Israeli Jews as sadists, and Armenians as stupid lying pigs deserving to be massacred. Such racist insults towards these groups (whites, Christians, Jews and Armenians) are tolerated with no counter-measures following. The scope of disciplines and nation-wide scale advancing these views means the phenomenon is not limited to one particular group of tenured Academics but rather outlines a broader academic culture that promotes such ideas, elevates their proponents to folk heroes, and protects them from what academic circles call "witch hunt." Columbia University is most represented on the list with nine members.

Following the controversy over Ward Churchill's essay about the September 11 attacks, "On the Justice of Roosting Chickens," Horowitz argued that there were many "careers like Ward Churchill's." He wrote that "Not all of the professors depicted in this volume hold views as extreme as Ward Churchill's, but a disturbing number do" and "it would have been no problem to provide a thousand such profiles or even ten times the number."

== Responses by persons mentioned ==
Horowitz accuses Eric Foner, former president of the American Historical Association, of being an "apologist for American Communism." Foner said, "Mr. Horowitz's 'chapter' on me is full of errors, beginning with the long quote with which he opens, which was written by someone else, not me. This is a fair example of the reliability of his work. But to get into a debate about Horowitz is a waste of time, and accords his attacks a legitimacy they do not deserve."

Horowitz wrongly attributed to Foner a statement by the late British author and journalist, Paul Foot. In the introduction to his book, Horowitz said the profiles were written by 30 researchers he had hired. He wrote: "I have revised and edited all of the profiles contained in this text and rewritten many ... I am ultimately responsible for their judgements and accuracy." On his blog, Horowitz admitted wrongly attributing material to Foner, blamed the error on the 30 researchers, and went on to say that the errors in his book are "inconsequential."

Horowitz accused Dana L. Cloud, associate professor of communication studies at the University of Texas at Austin, as an "anti-American radical" who "routinely repeats the propaganda of the Saddam regime." Along with the 99 other professors in his book, Horowitz accuses her of the "explicit introduction of political agendas into the classroom" (pp. 93, 377).

Cloud replied in Inside Higher Ed that her experience demonstrates that Horowitz does real damage to professors' lives—and that he should be viewed that way, not just as a political opponent.

Horowitz's attacks have been significant. People who read the book or his Web site regularly send letters to university officials asking for her to be fired. Personally, she has received—mostly via e-mail—"physical threats, threats of removing my daughter from my custody, threats of sexual assaults, horrible disgusting gendered things," she said. That Horowitz doesn't send these isn't the point, she said. "He builds a climate and culture that emboldens people," and as a result, shouldn't be seen as a defender of academic freedom, but as its enemy.

Horowitz also alleged that professor Michael Bérubé's classes "often have little to do with literature," and that Bérubé believes "religious people were to be regarded as simply irrational."

Bérubé, who teaches at Penn State University and sits on the National Council of the American Association of University Professors, replied that Horowitz "knows nothing about my classroom demeanor or my record as a faculty member. If he were a college student and tried to get away with this garbage, he would indeed be flunked—not for his conservatism, but for his mendacity." Bérubé was also invited to comment at Horowitz's magazine, and Bérubé wrote a response to questions provided by Horowitz's assistant. Horowitz published only an excerpted version of his response, prompting accusations of dishonesty from Bérubé.

The sociologist Todd Gitlin, who was included in the book, wrote a scathing response claiming that "Horowitz has absolutely no idea what I do in the classroom" and that his "idea of research is cherry-picking". Gitlin also added that Horowitz' standards of danger do not include "Holocaust deniers, white supremacists, or advocates of torture".

== Reviews ==
The review in the industry news digest Publishers Weekly stated that Horowitz's "intention to expose the majority of these professors as 'dangerous' and undeserving of their coveted positions seems petty in some cases, as when he smugly mocks the proliferation of departments dedicated to peace studies or considers 'anti-war activist' as a character flaw... the most egregious crimes perpetrated by the majority of these academics is that their politics don't mesh with Horowitz's."

Shortly after the book was released in January 2006, Neil Gross, assistant professor of sociology at Harvard University, wrote a review for the Boston Globe calling it poor scholarship and criticizing it for being one-sided, noting that Horowitz was especially eager to criticize Marxists.

In the Los Angeles Times, columnist Rosa Brooks wrote that Horowitz's real agenda was to marginalize or eliminate "academics who deviate from the right-wing party line."

A USA Today article, citing the report by Free Exchange on Campus mentioned above, stated that "The book profiles faculty who Horowitz says represent the kind of disorder going on in college classrooms today. But professor by professor, the report cites errors, fabrications and misleading statements", and concludes that Horowitz's research is "manipulated to fit his arguments". Citing the report's findings, the newspaper said Horowitz accuses sociology senior lecturer Sam Richards of reinforcing class lessons "with 'out-of-class' assignments that include the viewing of left-wing propaganda films, such as The Oil Factor, from which students learn that the 'war in Afghanistan has turned into a bloody quagmire,' ... and Occupation 101, about the horrors of Israel's 'occupation' of Palestinian terrorists,'" Richards responded, in the report, to the book's claims, saying Horowitz "disingenuously fails to note that students also receive credit for attending 'conservative' events, including a talk by none other than David Horowitz!"

Charles McGrath, reviewing the book for The New York Times, wrote "you have to wonder what Mr. Horowitz is so worried about. If indeed there is a professorial cabal dedicated to converting American students to Marxism, or worse, it is manifestly failing. The country is more conservative than it has been in decades, and by far the most popular undergraduate major these days is business." McGrath wrote that Horowitz is concerned with "a pervasive liberal bias at American universities" and that "Academic freedom is being so abused by such people, Mr. Horowitz believes, that he has drawn up an Academic Bill of Rights that, if its conservative supporters have their way, would put the state, and not the university, in charge of reviewing what professors are entitled to say."

In the National Review, Alston B. Ramsay wrote: "For anyone who has monitored higher education's pulse rate even cursorily during the last three decades, the central premise of The Professors will come as no surprise: Our universities have been hijacked by a band of rabid, anti-intellectual liberals more concerned with advancing ideological agendas—usually of the "social justice" variety—than with educating students. (Predictably, both the ACLU and the National Education Association have blasted the book.)"

In its review, the progressive group Media Matters for America stated that Horowitz mentioned "nothing but out-of-class activities" and speech in 52 of the 100 profiles in the book.

Paul Weyrich of the conservative Free Congress Foundation commented that "Horowitz estimates that there are about 60,000 of these radical professors in every part of the nation ... We are not talking about liberals here. Horowitz is clear that while he thinks liberals are wrong they are entitled to their opinions. Rather, we are talking about the most vile, America-hating Stalinist-style professors who will accept no dissent. They preach tolerance and then practice the opposite."

In a March 2007 debate with Horowitz, American Association of University Professors President Cary Nelson told the author: "That's largely a book in which for many of those people their primary works of scholarship are simply set aside and ignored. Occasional political comments are taken out of context sometimes, letters to the editor, you know, occasional political interventions and their entire lives—and their meaning and their presence in American culture is evaluated on the basis of those occasional statements. That to me, as a scholar, was a fundamental violation of fairness."
