= Robert Spencer (author) =

American anti-Muslim writer and blogger

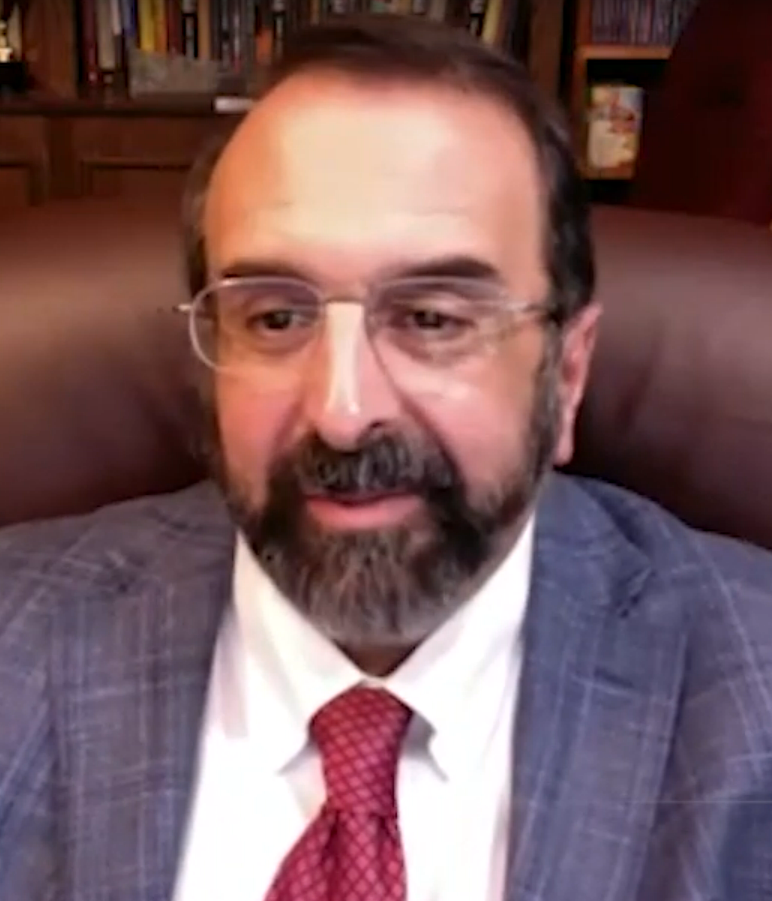
- Spencer in 2021
- Born: Robert Bruce Spencer; February 27, 1962 (age 64)
- Education: University of North Carolina at Chapel Hill (MA)
- Occupations: Author; blogger
- Years active: 2002–present
- Organizations: David Horowitz Freedom Center; Stop Islamization of America
- Known for: Anti-Muslim views, Jihad Watch, books

Robert Bruce Spencer (born February 27, 1962) is an American anti-Muslim (Note: Sources describing Spencer as anti-Muslim or Islamophobic:) author and blogger, and one of the key figures of the counter-jihad movement. Spencer founded and has directed the blog Jihad Watch since 2003. In 2010 he co-founded the organization Stop Islamization of America with Pamela Geller.

Three of Spencer's books reached The New York Times Best Seller list. Reports that two of Spencer's books were listed in FBI training materials and that he had given seminars to various law enforcement units in the United States stirred controversy. In 2013, the UK Home Office barred Spencer from travel to the United Kingdom for three to five years for "making statements that may foster hatred that might lead to inter-community violence". He has frequently appeared on Fox News.

== Background ==
Spencer was baptized in the Greek Orthodox Church and joined the Melkite Greek Catholic Church in 1984. Spencer has stated that, under the reign of President Mustafa Kemal Atatürk, his grandparents were forced to emigrate from an area that is now part of Turkey because they were Christians. Spencer's father worked for Voice of America during the Cold War, and in his younger days, Spencer himself worked at Revolution Books, a Maoist bookstore in New York City founded by Robert Avakian.

Spencer received an M.A. in 1986 in religious studies from the University of North Carolina at Chapel Hill. His masters thesis was on monophysitism and the history of the Catholic Church.

Spencer has been harshly criticized by several clerics of the Roman Catholic Church because of his views on Islam. In 2016, as a result of "personal reflection and historical study", Spencer returned to the Greek Orthodox Church.

== Activities and writings ==
Spencer has been studying Islamic theology, law, and history since 1980, but his publications on Islam and Muslims have not undergone academic peer review. They have been published by publishing houses that specialize in the writings of political conservatives, mostly Regnery Publishing or Bombardier Books. He worked in think tanks for more than 20 years, and in 2002–2003 was an adjunct fellow with the Free Congress Foundation.

A 2010 investigative report by The Tennessean described Spencer as one of several individuals who "cash in on spreading hate and fear about Islam." The Tennessean investigation concluded: "IRS filings from 2008 show that Robert Spencer earned $132,537 from the David Horowitz Freedom Center." In addition to being the editor for the David Horowitz Freedom Center's Jihad Watch blog, Spencer has also written for Breitbart News, and has been a columnist for Human Events, PJ Media and FrontPage Magazine.

Spencer co-founded the anti-Muslim group Stop Islamization of America (also known as the American Freedom Defense Initiative) with Pamela Geller in 2010. The organization is designated as a "hate group" by the Anti-Defamation League and the Southern Poverty Law Center. Together with Geller he led a campaign to stop the building of Park51, an Islamic community center near the World Trade Center, which they referred to as the "Ground Zero Mosque", claiming that imam Feisal Abdul Rauf planned to build a "victory mosque" to celebrate the destruction of the World Trade Center in the September 11 attacks.

=== Ban from entering the UK ===
On June 26, 2013, both Spencer and Pamela Geller were banned from entering the UK. They were due to speak at an English Defence League march in Woolwich, south London, where Drummer Lee Rigby was killed by two Muslims. Home Secretary Theresa May informed Spencer and Geller that their presence in the UK would "not be conducive to the public good". A letter from the UK Home Office stated that this decision is based on Spencer's statement that Islam "is a religion or a belief system that mandates warfare against unbelievers for the purpose of establishing a societal model that is absolutely incompatible with Western society. ...Because of media and general government unwillingness to face the sources of Islamic terrorism, these things remain largely unknown." The decision was to stand for between three and five years. The ban followed a concerted campaign by the UK anti-racism organization Hope not Hate, which said it had collected 26,000 signatures for a petition to the Home Secretary. Spencer and Geller contested the ban, but in 2015 the British Court of Appeals dismissed the appeal, arguing that "this was a public order case where the police had advised that significant public disorder and serious violence might ensue from the proposed visit."

The ban was criticized by author Douglas Murray. He has stated his belief that because Islamic supremacist hate preachers were and are still allowed to enter the UK, and because what Geller and Spencer say is much less objectionable than the views and statements of extremist Muslim clerics such as Muhammad al-Arefe (who was allowed to enter the UK shortly before Spencer and Geller were banned), the ban is unjust. Spencer responded to the ban by stating that the UK had become a "de facto Islamic state".

The government of Pakistan previously banned Spencer's book, The Truth About Muhammad, in 2007, citing "objectionable material" as the cause. His book Onward Muslim Soldiers was banned in Malaysia the same year.

=== Speaking engagements ===
Spencer as guest of a webinar by the Middle East Forum in 2020

Spencer spoke at Truman State University in April 2017 despite protests and a petition against him, having been invited by the Young America's Foundation. He spoke at the University of Buffalo in May the same year, where he was shouted down and heckled. He also spoke at Gettysburg College two days later; 375 alumni urged the college president Janet Morgan Riggs to cancel the speech, but the event went on as planned. Spencer said, "There is one kind of diversity that is not valued generally in an academic setting and that is intellectual diversity." Spencer spoke at Stanford University in November 2017, during which a group of students walked out.

Spencer has said that "a young Icelandic Leftist" poisoned him in 2017 in Reykjavik, Iceland, after a speaking event where he warned Icelanders of the dangers of "the impact of Islam" on Icelandic society. A medical report indicated he had been given MDMA and amphetamines.

Spencer became a senior fellow of Frank Gaffney's Center for Security Policy in 2020, after years of consultations with the group. He is also a frequent guest on Gaffney's Secure Freedom Radio and Securing America TV.

== Influence and criticism ==
Spencer is known for his anti-Muslim views. He comments on radical Islam, Islamic extremism, Islamic terrorism, and Islamism. His main thesis is that Islam is an inherently violent religion, and that extremists who commit acts of terror are simply following Islam's most authentic version. According to author Todd H. Green, Spencer's commentary on Islam has been regarded as "hav[ing] made a huge impact on the misinformation about Islam that circulates so freely on the Internet, in the media, and in political circles."

Spencer's 2008 book Stealth Jihad: How Radical Islam is Subverting America without Guns or Bombs has been seen to have developed one of the most important ideas of the counter-jihad, namely the "stealth jihad" idea that "terrorists aren't America's real Muslim problem", writing that "distracted by foreign wars and the prospect of domestic terror attacks, Americans pay little heed to the true agents of intolerance in their midst", namely the Muslim Brotherhood and its alleged American offshoots such as the Council on American-Islamic Relations (CAIR) and Muslim Public Affairs Council (MPAC).

The perpetrator of the 2011 Norway attacks, Anders Behring Breivik, cited Robert Spencer 64 times in his manifesto and wrote of him: "About Islam I recommend essentially everything written by Robert Spencer." Spencer condemned Breivik and said he was unfairly blamed by the media for the attack, likening it to Charles Manson drawing inspiration from The Beatles. Breivik has later admitted that he has been a neo-Nazi since the early 1990s, who only in later years exploited counter-jihad writings.

In July 2011, Wired magazine reported that two of Spencer's books were listed in FBI training materials. Both The Truth About Muhammad and The Politically Incorrect Guide to Islam were recommended for agents hoping to better understand Islam. His books were later dropped from federal training programs.

== Bibliography ==
- Muhammad: A Critical Biography. Bombardier. 2024. ISBN 979-8888453087.
- Empire of God: How the Byzantines Saved Civilization. Bombardier. 2023. ISBN 978-1637587423.
- The Sumter Gambit: How the Left Is Trying to Foment a Civil War. Bombardier. 2023. ISBN 978-1637585320.
- The Critical Qur'an: Explained from Key Islamic Commentaries and Contemporary Historical Research. Bombardier. 2022. ISBN 978-1642939491.
- Who Lost Afghanistan?. Center for Security Policy. 2022. ISBN 979-8849452913.
- The Church and the Pope: The Case for Orthodoxy. Uncut Mountain. 2022. ISBN 978-1639410057.
- Islamophobia and the Threat to Free Speech. Center for Security Policy. 2021. ISBN 979-8528301945.
- Rating America's Presidents: An America-First Look at Who Is Best, Who Is Overrated, and Who Was An Absolute Disaster. Bombardier. 2020. ISBN 978-1642935356.
- The Palestinian Delusion: The Catastrophic History of the Middle East Peace Process. Bombardier. 2019. ISBN 978-1642932546.
- The History of Jihad: From Muhammad to ISIS. Bombardier. 2018. ISBN 9781682616598.
- Confessions of an Islamophobe. Bombardier. 2017. ISBN 978-1682614914.
- The Complete Infidel's Guide to Free Speech (and Its Enemies). Regnery. 2017. ISBN 978-1621576273.
- The Complete Infidels' Guide to Iran. Regnery. 2016. ISBN 978-1621575160.
- The Complete Infidel's Guide to ISIS. Regnery. 2015. ISBN 978-1-62157-453-8.
- The Arab Winter Comes to America: The Truth about the War We're In. Regnery. 2014. ISBN 978-1-62157-204-6.
- Not Peace But a Sword: The Great Chasm Between Christianity and Islam. Catholic Answers. 2013. ISBN 978-1938983283.
- Did Muhammad Exist?: An Inquiry Into Islam's Obscure Origins. ISI Books. 2012. ISBN 978-1-61017-061-1.
- The Post-American Presidency: The Obama Administration's War on America (with Pamela Geller). Threshold Editions. 2010. ISBN 978-1-4391-8930-6.
- The Complete Infidels' Guide to the Koran. Regnery. 2009. ISBN 978-1-59698-104-1.
- Stealth Jihad: How Radical Islam is Subverting America without Guns or Bombs. Regnery. 2008. ISBN 978-1-59698-556-8.
- Religion of Peace?: Why Christianity Is and Islam Isn't. Regnery. 2007. ISBN 978-1-59698-515-5.
- The Truth About Muhammad: Founder of the World's Most Intolerant Religion. Regnery. 2006. ISBN 1-59698-028-1.
- The Politically Incorrect Guide to Islam (And the Crusades). Regnery. 2005. ISBN 0-89526-013-1.
- The Myth of Islamic Tolerance: How Islamic Law Treats Non-Muslims. Prometheus. 2005. ISBN 1-59102-249-5.
- Onward Muslim Soldiers: How Jihad Still Threatens America and the West. Regnery. 2003. ISBN 0-89526-100-6.
- Inside Islam: A Guide for Catholics: 100 questions and answers (with Daniel Ali). Ascension. 2003. ISBN 978-0-9659228-5-2.
- Islam Unveiled: Disturbing Questions About the World's Fastest Growing Faith. Encounter. 2002. ISBN 978-1-893554-58-0.
