= Jihad Watch =

American far-right anti-Muslim blog

- Website type: Blog
- Available in: English
- Owner: Robert Spencer
- Creators: Robert Spencer and Hugh Fitzgerald
- Website: jihadwatch.org
- Registration: None
- Launched: 23 September 2003
- Current status: Active

Jihad Watch is an American far-right Islamophobic blog operated by Robert Spencer. A project of the David Horowitz Freedom Center, Jihad Watch is the most popular blog within the counter-jihad movement.

== Organization ==
The site features commentary by multiple editors, and its most frequent editor is Robert Spencer. It is a project of the David Horowitz Freedom Center. Dhimmi Watch was a blog on the Jihad Watch site, also maintained by Spencer, focusing on alleged outrages by Muslims.

=== Funding ===
The Horowitz Freedom Center has paid Spencer, as Jihad Watch's director, a $132,000 salary in 2010. Jihad Watch has also received funding from donors supporting the Israeli right, and a variety of individuals and foundations, like Bradley Foundation and Joyce Chernick, wife of Aubrey Chernick. Politico said that during 2008–2010, "the lion's share of the $920,000 it [David Horowitz Freedom Center] provided over the past three years to Jihad Watch came from [Joyce] Chernick". In 2015, Jihad Watch received approximately $100,000 in revenue, with three quarters of that revenue coming from donations.

== Content and traffic ==
Articles begin with editorial commentary, then follow usually with a linked excerpt from a news website.

Jihad Watch is one of the world's most popular sites on the subject of terrorism, with more than 6,000 other sites being linked to it. It is the most popular counter-jihad blog.

== Reception ==
Jihad Watch has widely been described as an anti-Muslim blog. Jihad Watch has been criticized for its portrayal of Islam as a totalitarian political doctrine. The Southern Poverty Law Center and Anti-Defamation League consider Jihad Watch an active hate group due to its "extreme hostility toward Muslims." Guardian writer Brian Whitaker described Jihad Watch as a "notoriously Islamophobic website", while other critics such as Dinesh D'Souza, Karen Armstrong and Cathy Young, pointed to what they see as "deliberate mischaracterizations" of Islam and Muslims by Spencer as inherently violent and therefore prone to terrorism.

Benazir Bhutto, the Pakistani Prime Minister, in her book Reconciliation: Islam, Democracy, and the West, wrote that Spencer uses Jihad Watch to spread misinformation and hatred of Islam. She added that he presents a skewed, one-sided, and inflammatory story that only helps to sow the seed of civilizational conflict.

Abdel Bari Atwan, the editor-in-chief of the London-based pan-Arab newspaper Al-Quds Al-Arabi, wrote that "Most of the effective surveillance work tracking jihadi sites is being done not by the FBI or MI6, but by private groups. The best-known and most successful of those are [Internet] Haganah ... SITE [Institute] ... and Jihad Watch."

The website was cited 64 times by Norwegian far-right terrorist Anders Behring Breivik, who committed the 2011 Norway attacks.

In 2017, Christine Douglass-Williams was terminated as a board member of the Canadian Race Relations Foundation for her writings on the blog.

== See also ==
- Jew Watch
