= The Politically Incorrect Guide to English and American Literature =

- Cover of the first edition
- Author: Elizabeth Kantor
- Language: English
- Series: The Politically Incorrect Guide
- Publisher: Regnery Publishing
- Publication date: November 2006
- Publication place: United States
- Media type: Print (hardcover and paperback)
- Pages: 288
- ISBN: 1-59698-011-7

The Politically Incorrect Guide to English and American Literature is a 2006 book by Elizabeth Kantor. It is the sixth book in Regnery Publishing's Politically Incorrect Guide series.

== Background ==
Kantor argues that the study of literature in universities today is distorted by theories - developed in the 1960s at Yale and expanding through the 1970s and 1980s - that are aimed at attacking western civilization and Christianity for their alleged racism and sexism. This critical theory is believed by Kantor to have caused professors to replace the well-established literary canon with politically correct literature such as Margaret Atwood's The Handmaid's Tale (1985), the works of Toni Morrison and Dan Brown, or with theories such as Marxism and Freudianism.

== Summary ==
The main body of The Politically Incorrect Guide to English and American Literature, however, is focused upon an overview of the classic canon of English literature extending from Beowulf to Evelyn Waugh. There is another chapter after this discussing American literature from Nathaniel Hawthorne to Flannery O'Connor. Each chapter has:

1. a list of literature the author says serious students "must not miss"
2. boxed tests discussing "What PC professors don't want you to learn from..." (various authors)

Along with these are a list of important themes to the classic canon of English literature, together with explanations why politically correct literature professors do not want their students to learn. In the opinion of Kantor, these politically correct professors want to make sure students learn to despise western civilization and Christianity so that they are unable to reconsider the positions they acquire on classic literature after finishing their courses. Kantor believes that this is likely to help accelerate the decline of western civilization and its replacement with a very different culture which she believes will be much worse for everybody.
