= Ronald Radosh =

American historian (born 1937)

- Born: 1937 (age 88–89); New York City, United States
- Education: PhD (history)
- Alma mater: University of Wisconsin–Madison
- Occupations: Writer, professor, historian
- Known for: Rosenberg espionage case
- Spouse(s): Alice Schweig (m. 1959; divorced) Allis Rosenberg Radosh (m. 1975)
- Website: www.hudson.org/experts/335-ronald-radosh

Ronald Radosh (/ˈreɪdɒʃ/ RAY-dosh; born 1937) is an American social conservative writer, professor, historian, and former Marxist. As he described in his memoirs, Radosh was, like his Ashkenazi Jewish parents, a member of the Communist Party USA until the exposure of the truth about Stalinism began during the Khrushchev Thaw. He later became an activist in the New Left against the Vietnam War.

Radosh turned his attention in the late 1970s to Julius and Ethel Rosenberg, whom he had believed for decades to have been the innocent victims of judicial murder by a kangaroo court. After studying declassified FBI documents obtained under the Freedom of Information Act and interviewing their friends and associates, Radosh came to the conclusion that the Rosenbergs had in fact committed espionage for the Soviet KGB during the Manhattan Project and the Korean War, the crime for which they were both executed. When Radosh published his conclusions, which he considered to be balanced and objective, the American New Left was outraged.

Radosh describes his subsequent experience, which he termed at the time "Left-Wing McCarthyism", as the moment when his political views began to shift towards neoconservatism, and states that his subsequent research as a historian has continued to make him very critical of both Marxism and Communism. Currently employed by the Hudson Institute, Radosh has also published an exposé about the covert activities of Joseph Stalin's NKVD and the Red Terror during the Spanish Civil War.

His most recent book, about the foundation of the State of Israel, was co-authored with his second wife, Allis Radosh: A Safe Haven: Harry S. Truman and the Founding of Israel was published by HarperCollins in 2009. The Radoshes are currently writing a book about the presidency of Warren G. Harding, to be published by Simon & Schuster.

== Early life ==
Radosh was born on the Lower East Side of Manhattan and raised in Washington Heights. His parents, Reuben Radosh and Ida Kreichman, were Ashkenazi Jewish immigrants from Eastern Europe. A self-described red diaper baby who was, "born on the First of May", Radosh has stated that his earliest memory is of being taken to a May Day parade in Union Square. His maternal uncle, Irving Keith (formerly Irving Kreichman), had trained at the International Lenin School in Moscow and then travelled to the Second Spanish Republic to fight as a Commissar in the Abraham Lincoln Brigade during the Spanish Civil War. Irving Keith, who was killed in action during the spring 1938 retreat, was revered as an anti-fascist martyr by the Radosh family and his nephew grew up regularly re-reading his letters. It was only decades later that Radosh became very critical of his uncle's many written defenses of the ongoing Red Terror by the Servicio de Información Militar throughout the Spanish Republican Army, by simply repeating the conspiracy theory that all members of the anti-Stalinist Left were a crypto-fascist "rearguard" who sought to "create divisions in the Popular Front".

In the 1940s and the 1950s, Radosh attended the Little Red School House and Elisabeth Irwin High School, both of which were private schools for children from the Communist Party USA families. He also attended the communist-run Camp Woodland for Children in the Catskill Mountains. His memoirs vividly describe school-day encounters with Mary Travers, Woody Guthrie, and Peter Seeger. Like almost everyone else he knew, Radosh was involved in protesting against American involvement in the Korean War and also believed in William A. Reuben's "first conspiracy theory ... that the U.S. Government had framed the Rosenbergs and forced the key government witness, Harry Gold, to lie on the witness stand".

On June 19, 1953, Radosh joined Howard Fast and Civil Rights Congress leader William L. Patterson in a mass demonstration in Union Square against the imminent execution of Julius and Ethel Rosenberg. When Fast announced that the Rosenbergs were being led into the execution chamber, Radosh recalls that a wail went through the crowd and the Party's folk singers began singing, Go Down Moses. The following morning, Radosh attended the Rosenbergs' subsequent secular funeral in full Labor Youth League regalia. He later recalled, "That moment would remain etched in my memory, forever the symbol of what awaited good, progressive Jews who dared to stand up for their beliefs. It would take almost forty years for me to face up to the real meaning of the Rosenberg case for America."

== University education ==
Radosh began attending the University of Wisconsin–Madison in the fall of 1955. He has said that his desire at the time was both to study history, which Karl Marx considered queen of the sciences, and to become a leader of America's communists. Despite being raised to always defend the actions of the Soviet Union, Radosh developed a close friendship with Professor George Mosse, a Jewish refugee from Nazi Germany and member of the anti-Stalinist Left, which Radosh had been raised to detest. In 1959, Radosh arrived at the University of Iowa and intended to work towards his master's degree. While Iowa City, "boasted one small, dilapidated movie theatre, many bars, [and] few restaurants", in Radosh's own words, "the town also had its bohemian and political fringe". For example, there was already one off-campus "Greenwich Village-style coffee shop" where Radosh regularly met to play folk music with Robert Mezey, Sol Stern, and other fellow radicals with whom he helped found the "Iowa Socialist Discussion Club."

In September 1961, the Radosh family returned to Madison. Radosh had received his masters as a historian, and began working towards his doctorate under William Appleman Williams, one of the founders of the Wisconsin School of diplomatic history, who further drew his young protege into the New Left. Meanwhile, Ronald and Alice Radosh twice hosted, at their studio apartment along State Street in Madison, a young and unknown guitar playing folk singer, who deliberately dressed like and emulated Woody Guthrie and whose name was Bob Dylan. Dylan once told Radosh, "I'm going to be as big a star as Elvis Presley ... I'll play the same and even bigger arenas. I know it." Radosh and Dylan performed together at "regular, impromptu hootenanny sessions in a small new cafe on State Street, a place modeled after Greenwich Village hangouts". Radosh later recalled, "In the years to come, I often wished someone had been running a tape recorder at these regular sessions."

Despite being raised as a red diaper baby by fellow travelers, Radosh's growing fondness during the early 1960s for the writings of Trotskyist historian Isaac Deutscher enraged senior members of the American Communist Party in Madison. According to Radosh, Deutscher's writings told the truth about Stalinism and the Great Purge, without completely rejecting Marxist-Leninism or the October Revolution. The American Communist Party in Madison's attempts to coerce and intimidate Radosh back into the party line backfired and instead became the major factor in his departure. The last straw came when "the party sent its top youth organizer, Danny Rubin, to stay with us". Upon seeing multiple Deutscher's books on Radosh's bookshelf, Rubin "threw a fit", and screamed, "As a good Communist, you cannot read this junk! Get rid of it!" Rubin then pulled out a copy of World Marxist Review and screamed, "This is what you should be reading, not Trotskyite junk!" Despite still being a senior leader of Madison's Labor Youth League, Radosh broke with the Soviet-backed Communist Party USA and continued to become a founding father of the American New Left.

== Vietnam War ==
In 1963, Radosh returned to New York City with his wife and children. After teaching at two community colleges in Brooklyn, Radosh joined the New York chapter of the Committee to Stop the War in Vietnam. He recalled:

When Norman Thomas died in 1968, I wrote what may have been the only published negative assessment of his life. Most obituaries heralded Thomas as the nation's conscience, a man of principle who had turned out to be right about a great deal. Of course, Thomas was against the war in Vietnam; he had made a famous speech in which he said he came not to burn the American flag but to cleanse it. But for radicals like myself, that proved that he was a sellout. His opposition to the war was so tame, I argued, that he actually helped the American ruling class. I claimed that Thomas' opposition to LBJ's bombing campaign was only a "tactical" difference with the President. Thomas' chief sin, in my view, was to have written that he did not, "regard Vietcong terrorism as virtuous". He was guilty of attacking the heroic Vietnamese people, instead of the United States, which was the enemy of the world's people. My final judgment was that Thomas had "accepted the Cold War, its ideology and ethics and had decided to enlist in fighting its battles" on the wrong—the anti-communist—side.

Soon afterward, Radosh joined the New York chapter of Students for a Democratic Society. In his book Prophets on the Right, completed in 1974, Radosh referred to himself as both "an advocate of a socialist solution to America's domestic crisis" and "a radical historian." The book profiles several historical conservative or far-right isolationists, "critics of American globalism", men who were "outside the consensus, or the mainstream ... [and] regarded as subversive of the existing order." Radosh's stated aim in writing the book was to "move us... to think carefully about alternative possibilities" to "our current predicament," which was a clear reference to the ongoing Vietnam War. In 1976, Radosh was a "founding sponsor" of James Weinstein's magazine In These Times.

== Second thoughts ==
While researching his 1978 article The Rosenberg File and expanding it into a 1983 book of the same name, Radosh was forced to conclude that Julius Rosenberg had been guilty of both treason and espionage, and that Ethel was aware of his activities. At the same time, Radosh and his two respective coauthors also exposed and condemned multiple acts of prosecutorial misconduct during the trial by Assistant U.S. Attorney Roy Cohn. Radosh similarly condemned multiple violations of the United States Constitution and the Bill of Rights during the era of McCarthyism. Radosh also learned that the U.S. Department of Justice had gone for the death penalty at the trial of the Rosenbergs only because they wanted Julius Rosenberg to cooperate with investigators and testify as a prosecution witness against other, even more damaging Soviet spies. The Rosenbergs' refusal of all offers to cooperate in return for a more lenient sentence was accordingly a great disappointment to both federal prosecutors and to the U.S. Intelligence Community.

Despite his claims of being unbiased and evenhanded as a historian, Radosh found himself subjected to both ostracism and character assassination by the American New Left in an effort to discredit the conclusions in his book. One friend told him, "The facts are irrelevant, we need the Rosenbergs as heroes." As a result of their 1983 book and the subsequent revelations in the Vassiliev papers as well as decrypted Soviet intelligence communications from the era through the Venona project, a consensus has emerged that rather than having been framed by the FBI, both of the Rosenbergs had in fact been very valuable NKVD spies, and that Julius Rosenberg was both the handler and agent recruiter whose active network of moles and couriers stole highly significant military and nuclear secrets for the Soviet Union during both World War II and the Korean War. A second edition of The Rosenberg File was published by Yale University Press in 1997 and incorporated newly obtained evidence, which further proved the Rosenberg's guilt, that Radosh obtained from the former KGB archives after the collapse of the Soviet Union.

Radosh's memoirs, published in 2001 as Commies: A Journey Through the Old Left, the New Left, and the Leftover Left, discussed the various reasons for his disillusionment with Marxist solutions and embrace of American patriotism and social conservatism, including the vicious blacklash over his exposure of the Rosenbergs and learning of both widespread human rights abuses and the abuse of psychiatry by Fidel Castro, and his fellow tourists' efforts to excuse those abuses, during a mid-1970s trip to Cuba. According to Radosh, the last straw came when he visited refugee camps in Central America during the 1980s and listened to what he described as horrifying accounts of the tyranny experienced by the many Nicaraguan people who had fled from the Sandinistas.

The Rosenberg's co-defendant Morton Sobell's 2008 interview with Sam Roberts of The New York Times had him admit his own guilt and that of Julius Rosenberg after years of proclaiming his innocence, which further vindicated Radosh's once controversial thesis in The Rosenberg File. A year later, Radosh and Steven Usdin also interviewed Sobell. Writing in The Weekly Standard, Radosh outlined the dimensions of the classified material that Sobell had passed to the Soviet KGB as part of the Rosenberg spy ring.

Radosh's writings have appeared in The New Republic, The Weekly Standard, National Review, the blog FrontPage Magazine, and many other newspapers and magazines. He was a faculty member at Queensborough Community College and the Graduate Center of the City University of New York. Radosh is now an adjunct fellow at the Hudson Institute in Washington, D.C., and a professor emeritus of history at the City University of New York (CUNY).

== Family ==
Radosh married Alice Schweig in the summer of 1959. He recalls, "Our wedding was on Labor Day weekend, and after the ceremony we drove into New York to spend one night in town. We celebrated our wedding by watching the annual proletarian Labor Day parade that still marched through downtown New York." They separated in 1969 and later divorced. In October 1975, Radosh married Allis Rosenberg, who has a PhD in American History and has co-authored two books with him. The couple reside in Silver Spring, Maryland.

== Controversy ==
On 7 August 2014, Radosh reviewed Diana West's American Betrayal in FrontPage Magazine. West had alleged that infiltration of the United States federal government by Stalinist moles and fellow travelers had significantly altered Western Allies and policies during World War II to favor the Soviet Union. Radosh criticized West's limited knowledge of the scholarly literature and called her thesis a "yellow journalism conspiracy theory". West published a follow-up book focusing on the attack on her by Radosh and others. The journal The New Criterion had a full-fledged dialogue about the issues that arose because of his critique of West.

== Works ==
=== Books ===
- American Labor and United States Foreign Policy. New York: Random House, 1969.
- Debs. Englewood Cliffs, New Jersey: Prentice-Hall, 1971.
- A New History of Leviathan: Essays on the American Corporate State. Edited with Murray Rothbard. New York: E. P. Dutton, 1972.
- Prophets On The Right: Profiles of Conservative Critics of American Globalism. New York: Simon & Schuster, 1975.
- The New Cuba: Paradoxes and Potentials. New York: Morrow, 1976.
- The Rosenberg File: A Search for Truth. Co-authored with Joyce Milton. New York: Holt, Rinehart and Winston, 1983; Reissued with new introduction: New Haven: Yale University Press, 1993.
- Divided They Fell: The Demise of the Democratic Party, 1964–1996. New York: Free Press, 1996.
- The Amerasia Spy Case: Prelude to McCarthyism. Co-authored with Harvey Klehr. University of North Carolina Press, 1996.
- Commies: A Journey Through the Old Left, the New Left, and the Leftover Left. San Francisco: Encounter Books, 2001.
- Spain Betrayed: The Soviet Union in the Spanish Civil War Co-authored with Mary R. Habeck and Grigorii Nikolaevich Sevostianov. New Haven: Yale University Press, 2001.
- Red Star Over Hollywood: The Film Colony's Long Romance With The Left. Co-authored with Allis Radosh. San Francisco: Encounter Books, 2005.
- A Safe Haven: Harry S. Truman and the Founding of Israel. Co-authored with Allis Radosh. New York: HarperCollins, 2009.

=== Articles ===
- "John Spargo and Wilson's Russian Policy, 1920." Journal of American History, volume 52, number 3 (December 1965), pages 548–565. JSTOR 1890847.
- "Were the Rosenbergs Framed?" New York Review of Books (July 21, 1983).
- "Books in Review. The Black Book of Communism: Crimes, Terror, Repression." First Things (Feb. 2000).
- "The Sandbagging of Robert 'KC' Johnson." New York Sun.
- "Why Conservatives Are So Upset with Thomas Woods's Politically Incorrect History Book." History News Network.
- "The Cuba Conundrum: Who Is Attacking Our Diplomats and Spies in Cuba?" Hudson Institute (October 4, 2017).

=== Book reviews ===
- "Democracy and the Formation of Foreign Policy: The Case of F.D.R. and America's Entrance Into World War II." Review of F.D.R.'s Undeclared War, 1939 to 1941 by T. R. Fehrenbach. Left & Right, volume 3, number 3 (Spring/Autumn 1967) pages 31–38.

=== Contributions ===
- "Preface." As We Go Marching, by John T. Flynn. New York: Free Life Editions, 1973.
