= FrontPage Magazine =

American conservative political website

- Format: Online
- Owner: David Horowitz Freedom Center
- Managing editor: Jamie Glazov
- Political alignment: Right-wing to far-right
- Language: English
- Headquarters: Sherman Oaks, California, U.S.
- OCLC number: 47095728
- Website: frontpagemag.com

FrontPage Magazine, also known as FrontPageMag.com, is an American right-wing, anti-Islam political website edited by David Horowitz and published by the David Horowitz Freedom Center. The site has also been described by scholars and writers as far-right and Islamophobic.

== Content ==
FrontPage Magazine is a conservative journal of news and political commentary originally published under the auspices of the Center for the Study of Popular Culture, later called the David Horowitz Freedom Center.

The website has published commentary advancing the Eurabia conspiracy theory, and has been described as a part of the counter-jihad movement. The website is edited by Jamie Glazov, considered a "key figure in the transnational counterjihad movement," who also hosts the web show The Glazov Gang which "regularly broadcasts interviews with key counterjihad figures." The site also employs Daniel Greenfield, a "prolific anti-Muslim blogger and writer" who writes the column "The Point" and the counter-jihad blog Sultan Knish.

Other contributors have included Christine Williams, Paul Gottfried, John Derbyshire, Ann Coulter, Mustafa Akyol, Robert Spencer, Bruce Thornton, Raymond Ibrahim, Thom Nickels, Kenneth Timmerman, Bosch Fawstin, Bruce Bawer, and Stephen Miller.
