= David Horowitz Freedom Center =

Non-profit organisation in the USA

- Founded: 1988
- Founder: David Horowitz; Peter Collier
- Type: Conservative think-tank
- Tax ID no.: 95-4194642
- Purpose: Media
- Location: Sherman Oaks, Los Angeles, California 91499
- Region served: United States
- Product: FrontPage Magazine
- Key people: David Horowitz, Founder & CEO; Peter Collier, Vice President of Publications; Michael Finch, President
- Revenue: $5.4 million (2015)
- Website: horowitzfreedomcenter.org
- Formerly called: Center for the Study of Popular Culture

The David Horowitz Freedom Center, formerly the Center for the Study of Popular Culture (CSPC), is a conservative anti-Islam foundation founded in 1988 by political activist David Horowitz and his long-time collaborator Peter Collier. It was established with funding from groups including the John M. Olin Foundation, the Bradley Foundation and the Scaife Foundation.

It runs several websites and blogs, including the anti-Islam website FrontPage Magazine and the anti-Muslim blog Jihad Watch. It has been described as a part of the counter-jihad movement. It is designated as a hate group by the Southern Poverty Law Center.

== Finances ==
DHFC is a 501(c)(3) charity. In 2005 it had revenues of $4.9 million, expenses of $4.0 million, 8.4% of which was $336,000 compensation for David Horowitz. For 2008 the DHFC reported on IRS Form 990 revenues of $5,466,103 and expenses of $5,994,547 with total compensation to David Horowitz of $480,162 and to vice-president Peter Collier of $228,744. In 2015, Horowitz made $583,000 from the organization – that same year, the organization received $5.4 million in donations.

Between July 2000 and February 2006, the center (under its old name) was the sponsor of 25 trips by United States senators and representatives, all Republicans, to six different events. Total expenditures were about $43,000. In 2014–2015, Horowitz provided $250,000 in funding to the Dutch right-wing nationalist Geert Wilders's Party for Freedom.

== Activities ==
The center's activities have included:

- FrontPage Magazine – a political website edited by Horowitz that has been described by scholars and writers as right-wing, far-right, and anti-Islam.
- Discover the Networks – a database of alleged left-wing agendas, activists and groups. After two years of development, they went online in February 2005, with a staff of two at a cost of about $500,000.
- Jihad Watch (formerly Dhimmi Watch) – a blog run by blogger Robert Spencer which has been described as one of the main homes of the Counter-jihad movement on the internet.

- Heterodoxy was a news magazine published in a tabloid format by the center, edited by David Horowitz and Peter Collier. Its focus was exposing the excesses of "political correctness" on college and university campuses across the United States, describing itself as “an irreverent monthly journal combating the folly of political correctness.”
- Truth Revolt - a political website with the mission of destroying what it referred to as the leftist media "where they stand." The editor-in-chief of the site was Ben Shapiro and the managing editor was Jeremy Boreing. Boreing was fired from the website in 2015, and Shapiro resigned shortly after. Mark Tapson took over as editor-in-chief. The site closed in March 2018.

== Criticism ==
The Southern Poverty Law Center (SPLC) has described the Center as a far-right organization and anti-Muslim hate group. According to Horowitz, the SPLC's designation resulted in the Freedom Center's donation processing being blocked by Visa and Mastercard.

Chip Berlet, writing for the SPLC, accused Horowitz of blaming slavery on "black Africans ... abetted by dark-skinned Arabs" and of "attack[ing] minority 'demands for special treatment' as 'only necessary because some blacks can't seem to locate the ladder of opportunity within reach of others,' rejecting the idea that they could be the victims of lingering racism."

A 2011 report authored by Wajahat Ali, Eli Clifton, Matthew Duss, Lee Fang, Scott Keyes and Faiz Shakir of the Center for American Progress cited Horowitz as a prominent figure instrumental in propagating Islamophobia and spreading fear about an Islamic takeover of Western society. Horowitz responded, saying that the Center had "joined the Muslim Brotherhood".

In 2012, the Anti-Defamation League wrote that Horowitz sponsors a college campus project that promotes anti-Muslim views and arranges events with anti-Muslim activists. The DHFC was also a sponsor of the May 3, 2015, Muhammad Art Exhibit and Cartoon Contest in Garland, Texas, where two Muslim attackers were shot and killed by a school security guard.
