= List of Islamic apologetic works =

This is a list of works about Islamic apologetics (Kalam) .

== General ==
- Alsayyid, Ahmad Yusuf. Misconceptions and Refutations. Osoul Center, 2019.
- Aly, Waleed. People Like Us. Pan Macmillan, 2007. ISBN 978-0-330-42380-9.
- Arnold, Thomas Walker. The Preaching of Islam: A History of the Propagation of the Muslim Faith. India: Adam Publishers & Distributors, 2002.
- Attar, Samar. The Vital Roots of European Enlightenment: Ibn Tufayl's Influence on Modern Western Thought. United States: Lexington Books, 2007.
- Gulen, Fethullah. Questions And Answers About Islam. United States: Tughra Books, 2007.
- Hawramani, Ikram. An Intelligent Person's Guide to Understanding Islam and Muslims: What the West Misunderstands about Culture, Politics, Sexuality, Women and Rationality in Islamic Societies. Independently Published, 2018.
- Lyons, Jonathan. Islam Through Western Eyes: From the Crusades to the War on Terrorism. United States: Columbia University Press, 2014.
- Mawdudi, Abul A'la. Human Rights in Islam. Leicester: The Islamic Foundation. ISBN 0-9503954-9-8.
- Murata, Sachiko. Chittick, William. Vision of Islam. Paragon House, 1994.
- Naik, Zakir. Answers to Non-Muslims' Common Questions about Islam. India: Islami Kitab Ghar, 2012.
- Nasr, Seyyed Hossein. The Heart of Islam: Enduring Values for Humanity. HarperCollins, 2004.
- Qutb, Muhammad. Islam: The Misunderstood Religion. India: Markazi Maktaba Islami Publishers, 2004.
- Reeves, Minou, and P. J. Stewart. Muhammad in Europe: a Thousand Years of Western Myth-Making. Reading: Garnet, 2016.
- Said, Edward. Covering Islam: how the media and the experts determine how we see the rest of the world. New York: Random House. ISBN 978-0-679-75890-7.
- Sheikh, Zia U.. Islam: Silencing the Critics. United States: Createspace Independent Pub, 2012.
- Starr, S. Frederick. Xinjiang: China's Muslim Borderland. London: Routledge, 2015.
- Zafar, Harris. Demystifying Islam: Tackling the Tough Questions. Lanham: Rowman & Littlefield Publishers, 2017.

== Comparative Religion ==
- Naik, Zakir. The Concept of God in Major Religions. Saudi Arabia: Darussalam, 2007.

=== Christianity ===
- Ibn Taymiyah, Al-Jawāb al-Ṣaḥīḥ li-man baddala dīn al-Masīh (Literally, "The Correct Response to those who have Corrupted the Deen (Religion) of the Messiah"; A Muslim theologian's response to Christianity) – Seven Volumes. In modern critical editions it amounts to more than 2000 pages.
- Kairanawi, Rahmatullah. Izhar ul-Haqq (The Truth Revealed) Translated by Muhammad Wali Razi. Ta-Ha Publishers Ltd. 1 Wynne Road, London. ISBN 1-842000-4-62
- Deedat, Ahmed. The Choice: Islam & Christianity. India: Adam Publishers & Distributors, 2012.
- Deedat, Ahmed. Crucifixion or Cruci-Fiction. Pakistan: Islamic Propagation Centre International, 1984.
- Deedat, Ahmed. What the Bible Says About Muhammad (PBUH). Kuwait: Kazi Publications, 1982.
- Zakaria, Abu. JESUS: Man, Messenger, Messiah iERA, 2017. ISBN 9781910952030.
- Deedat, Ahmed. Is the Bible God's Word?. India: Islamic Propagation Centre, 1981.

=== Atheism ===
- Tzortzis, Hamza Andreas. The Divine Reality: God, Islam and the Mirage of Atheism. Revised. San Clemente: FB Publishing, 2018.
- Ahmad, Saiyad Fareed, and Saiyad Salahuddin Ahmad. God, Islam & the Skeptic Mind: a Study on Faith, Science, Religious Diversity, Ethics, and Evil. North Charleston, SC: CreateSpace, 2014.
- Green, A.R. Man in the Red Underpants. onereason ISBN 9785882184642
- Maḥmūd, Muṣṭafá. Dialogue with an Atheist. United Kingdom: Dar Al Taqwa, 1994.
- Zakaria, Abu. The Eternal Challenge: A Journey Through The Miraculous Qur’an. onereason, 2015. ISBN 9781910952009.
- Malik, Shoaib Ahmed. Atheism and Islam: A Contemporary Discourse Abu Dhabi: Kalam Research & Media, 2018.
- Al-Shehri, Abdullah S. The Only Way Out: A Guide for Truth Seekers. 2010.

=== Hinduism ===
- Naik, Zakir. Similarities Between Hinduism & Islam. India: Adam Publishers & Distributors, 2007.

== Philosophy and Theology ==
- al-Ghazālī, Abu Hamid. The Incoherence of the Philosophers (Tr. Marmura, Michael E. Utah: Brigham Young University Press. ISBN 0-8425-2466-5)
- al-Juwainī, ʻAbd-al-Malik Ibn-ʻAbdallāh. A Guide to Conclusive Proofs for the Principles of Belief (Kitāb Al-irshād ilā qawātiʻ Al-Adilla fī uṣūl Al-iʻtiqād). Translated by Paul E. Walker. Reading: Garnet, 2001.
- al-Uthaimeen, Shaikh Muhammad ibn Saleh. Are We Forced or do we have Free Will? Quran Sunnah Educational Programs.

== Qur'an ==
- Draz, Muhammad Abdullah, Salahi, Adil. The Qur'an: An Eternal Challenge. Kube Publishing Limited. ISBN 9780860376491
- Ameri, Sami. Hunting for the word of God. Academic Research Initiative for Comparative Religion, 2017.
- Ali, Muhammad Mohar. The Qurʼân and the Orientalists: An Examination of Their Main Theories and Assumptions. United Kingdom: Jamʻiyat ʼIhyaaʼ Minhaaj al-Sunnah, 2004.
- Saeh, Bassam. The Miraculous Language of the Qur'an: Evidence of Divine Origin. United Kingdom: International Institute of Islamic Thought, 2015.
- Aʻẓamī, Muḥammad Muṣṭafá. The History of the Qur'ānic Text: From Revelation to Compilation: a Comparative Study with the Old and New Testaments. United Kingdom: UK Islamic Academy, 2003.
- Taslaman, Caner. The Quran: Unchallengeable Miracle. Turkey: Nettleberry/Çitlembik Publications, 2006.
- Al-Imam, Ahmad Ali. Variant Readings Of The Quran: A Critical Study Of Their Historical And Linguistic Origins. International Institute of Islamic Thought, 2006.
- El-Awa, Salwa. Textual Relations in the Quran: Relevance, Coherence and Structure. Routledge, 2006.
- Farrin, Raymond. Structure and Qur'anic Interpretation: a Study of Symmetry and Coherence in Islam's Holy Text. White Cloud Press, 2014.

== Muhammad ==
- Ali, Muhammad Mohar. Sîrat Al-Nabî and the Orientalists. King Fahd Complex for the Printing of the Holy Qur'an, 2018.
- Zayed, Moustafa. The Lies about Muhammad: An Answer to the Robert Spencer Book "The Truth about Muhammad". United States: Createspace Independent Pub, 2010.
- Armstrong, Karen. Muhammad: A Biography of the Prophet. United States: HarperCollins, 1993.
- Vidyarthi, Abdul. Mohammad in World Scriptures. India: Adam Publishers & Distributors, 1999.
- Cole, Juan. Muhammad: Prophet of Peace Amid the Clash of Empires. United States: Bold Type Books, 2018
- Lings, Martin. Muhammad: His Life Based on the Earliest Sources. United Kingdom: Islamic Texts Society, 1983..

== Hadith ==
- Jonathan A. C. Brown, Misquoting Muhammad: The Challenge and Choices of Interpreting the Prophet's Legacy Oneworld, 2015.

== History ==
- Al-Djazairi, S. E. The Myth of Muslim Barbarism and Its Aims. Manchester: Bayt Al-Hikma Press, 2007.
- al-Djazairi, S. E. The Hidden Debt to Islamic Civilisation. MSBN Books, 2018.
- Graham, Mark A. How Islam Created the Modern World. United States: Amana Publications, 2006.
- Morgan, Michael Hamilton. Lost History: The Enduring Legacy of Muslim Scientists, Thinkers, and Artists. Philippines: National Geographic, 2008.
- Lyons, Jonathan. The House of Wisdom: How the Arabs Transformed Western Civilization. United Kingdom: Bloomsbury USA, 2010.
- Nadvī, Abulḥasan ʻAlī. Saviours of Islamic Spirit. United States: White Thread Press, 2015.
- Alkhateeb, Firas. Lost Islamic History: Reclaiming Muslim Civilisation from the Past Oxford University Press, 2017.
- Murphy, Tim-Wallace. What Islam Did For Us: Understanding Islam's contribution to Western Civilization. Watkins, 2006.
- Al-Khalili, Jim. The House of Wisdom: How Arabic Science Saved Ancient Knowledge and Gave Us the Renaissance. Penguin Press, 2011

== Women ==
- Nadwī, Muḥammad Akram. Al-Muhaddithat: The Women Scholars in Islam. United Kingdom: Interface Publications, 2013.
- Bewley, Aisha. Islam: The Empowering of Women. Ta-Ha, 1999.
- Murata, Sachiko. The Tao of Islam: A Sourcebook on Gender Relationships in Islamic Thought. State University of New York Press, 1992.
- Bullock, Katherine. Rethinking Muslim Women and the Veil: Challenging Historical & Modern Stereotypes. International Institute of Islamic Thought, 2002.

== Islamic Law ==
- Al-Bouti, Muhammad Sa’id. Islamic Legal Punishments & The Zeitgeist. 2020. ISBN 9780359975914.
- Aʻẓamī, Muḥammad Muṣṭafá. On Schacht's Origins of Muhammadan Jurisprudence. United Kingdom: Oxford Centre for Islamic Studies, 1996.
- Ahmed, Rumee. Sharia Compliant: A User's Guide to Hacking Islamic Law. United States: Stanford University Press, 2018..
- Ahmed, Rumee. Narratives of Islamic Legal Theory OUP Oxford, 2012. ISBN 9780191630149
- Emon, Anver. Religious Pluralism and Islamic Law: Dhimmis and Others in the Empire of Law. OUP Oxford, 2012.

== Science ==
- Bucaille, Maurice. The Bible, the Quran & Science. New Delhi: Adam Publishers & Distributors, 2012.
- Naik, Zakir. The Qur'an & Modern Science: Compatible or Incompatible?. India: Darussalam, 2007.
- Guessoum, Nidhal. Islam's Quantum Question: Reconciling Muslim Tradition and Modern Science. United Kingdom: Bloomsbury Publishing, 2010.
- Tzortzis, Hamza Andreas. Embryology in the Quran onereason.

== Slavery ==
- Brown, Jonathan A.C.. Slavery and Islam. United Kingdom: Oneworld Publications, 2020.
- Diouf, Sylviane A. Servants of Allah: African Muslims Enslaved in the Americas NYU Press, 1998.

== Terrorism and Extremism ==
- Ridley, Yvonne. In the Hands of the Taliban. United Kingdom: Pavilion Books, 2014.
- Yahya, Harun. No Room for Terrorism in Islam. India: Adam Publishers & Distributors, 2004.
- Abou El Fadl, Khaled M. The Great Theft: Wrestling Islam from the Extremists HarperOne, 2009.
- al-Yaʻqūbī, Muḥammad. Refuting ISIS: Destroying Its Religious Foundations and Proving That It Has Strayed from Islam and That Fighting It Is an Obligation. Herndon, VA: Sacred Knowledge, 2016.

== By region ==
=== West (Europe and America) ===
- Baran, Zeyno., Tuohy, Emmet. Citizen Islam: The Future of Muslim Integration in the West. United Kingdom: Bloomsbury Publishing, 2011.
- Izetbegović, Alija. Islam Between East and West. United States: American Trust Publications, 1993.
- Ramadan, Tariq. Islam, the West and the Challenges of Modernity. United Kingdom: Kube Publishing Limited, 2009.
- Ramadan, Tariq. To Be a European Muslim. United Kingdom: Kube Publishing Limited, 2013.
- Nadwi, Abul Hasan Ali. Western Civilisation: Islam and Muslims. Academy of Islamic Research and Publications, Lucknow, 1979.
- Green, Todd H. The Fear of Islam: An Introduction to Islamophobia in the West Augsburg: Fortress Publishers, 2019.

== Politics ==
- Quṭb, Sayyid. Milestones. India: Islamic Book Service, 2003.

== Psychology ==
- Utz, Aisha. Psychology from the Islamic Perspective. Saudi Arabia: International Islamic Publishing House, 2011.
- Benslama, Fethi, Bononno, Robert. Psychoanalysis and the challenge of Islam. United Kingdom: University of Minnesota Press, 2009.

A biographical book defending Islam

== Nature ==
- Abdul-Matin, Ibrahim. Green Deen: What Islam Teaches about Protecting the Planet. United States: Berrett-Koehler Publishers, 2010.

== Communism ==
- Yahya, Harun. Communism in Ambush. Turkey: Global Pub., 2003.

== Autobiographical ==
- Asad, Muhammad. The Road to Mecca. Malaysia: Islamic Book Trust, 1996.
- Linda iLham Barto. Memoirs of a Hillbilly Muslim. United States: Dog Ear Publishing, LLC, 2011.
- Cole, Donald Powell. Road to Islam: From Texas to Saudi Arabia and Egypt. Egypt: Dar Alraya Top, 2009.
- al-Ghazali, Abu Hamid Muhammad. Deliverance from Error: An Annotated Translation of Al-Munqidh Min Al Dalal and Other Relevant Works of Al-Ghazali. Translator: McCarthy, Richard Joseph. United Kingdom: Fons Vitae, 1999.

== Literature and plays ==
- Tufayl, Ibn. Ibn Tufayl's Hayy Ibn Yaqzan: A Philosophical Tale. Translator: Lenn Evan Goodman, University of Chicago Press, 2015.
- Aboulela, Leila. Minaret. United Kingdom: Bloomsbury Publishing, 2015.

== Intra-Islam ==
- al-Ghazālī, Abu Hamid. The Revival of the Religious Sciences (Tr. Fazl ul Kareem, Pakistan: Darul Ishat)
- ibn al-Jawzi, A Great Collection of Fabricated Traditions.
- Iqbal, Muhammad. The Reconstruction of Religious Thought in Islam Kitab Bhavan, 2000. ISBN 81-7151-081-7.
- al-Ghazali, Zainab. Return of the Pharaoh. The Islamic Foundation.
- Khan, Nouman Ali. Revive Your Heart: Putting Life in Perspective. United Kingdom: Kube Publishing Limited, 2017.

== See also ==
- Bibliography of books critical of Christianity
- Bibliography of books critical of Islam
- Bibliography of books critical of Judaism
- Bibliography of books critical of Mormonism
- Bibliography of books critical of Scientology
- List of apologetic works
- List of Christian apologetic works
