= List of Christian apologetic works =

This is a list of Christian apologetic works.

== Antiquity ==
- Apologia prima (English: First Apology) (c. 150–155) by Justin Martyr
- Apologia secunda (English: Second Apology) (c. 150–57) by Justin Martyr
- Πρὸς Διόγνητον Ἐπιστολή (English: Epistle to Diognetus) (c. late 2nd century), author unknown
- The Apology to Autolycus (c. 169–83) by Theophilus of Antioch
- Octavius (before 250, likely contemporary with Tertullian's Apology) by Marcus Minucius Felix
- Apologeticus (or Apologeticum) (c. 197) by Tertullian
- De Carne Christi (English: On the Body of Christ) (c. 206) by Tertullian
- Contra Celsum (English: Against Celsus) (c. 248) by Origen of Alexandria
- De viris illustribus (English: On Illustrious Men) (c.392-3) by Jerome
- Apology Against Rufinus (402) by Jerome
- On the Consolation of Philosophy (524) by Boethius

== Medieval ==
- Scholion by Theodore Bar Konai (8th century, Church of the East)
- The Book of Proof and the Book of Questions and Answers by Ammar al-Basri (9th century, Church of the East)
- On the Proof of the Christian Religion and other works by Abu Raita al-Takriti (9th century, Syriac Orthodox)
- The Healer, by Gerasimos, Abbot of the Monastery of Saint Symeon (?13th century)
- Summa contra Gentiles (1265–74) by Saint Thomas Aquinas

== Early modern ==
- The Imitation of Christ (De Imitatione Christi) (c. 1418–1427) Thomas à Kempis
- De Arte Cabalistica (English: On the Art of Kabbalah) (1517) by Johann Reuchlin
- De veritate religionis Christianae (English: On the Truth of the Christian religion) (1627) by Hugo Grotius
- Pensées (1669) by Blaise Pascal
- Alciphron (or The Minute Philosopher) (1732) by George Berkeley
- The Pilgrim's Progress (1678) by John Bunyan
- Observations on the Conversion and Apostleship of St. Paul. in a Letter to Gilbert West, Esq (1747) by George Lyttelton, 1st Baron Lyttelton
- Observations on the History and Evidences of the Resurrection of Jesus Christ (1747) by Gilbert West
- The Evidences of the Christian Religion by Joseph Addison
- Dei fondamenti della religione e dei fonti dell'empietà (English: Of the Foundations of Religion, and the Fountains of Impiety) (1765) by Antonino Valsecchi
- Les erreurs de Voltaire (1766) by Claude-Adrien Nonnotte
- La Certitude des preuves du christianisme (1767) by Nicolas-Sylvestre Bergier
- Verità della Fede (1767) by Alphonsus Liguori
- Apologie de la religion chrétienne* (1769) by Nicolas-Sylvestre Bergier
- The Evidence of the Christian Religion Briefly and Plainly Stated (1786) by James Beattie
- A View of the evidences of Christianity in three parts (1794) by William Paley
- Génie du christianisme (1802) (English: The Genius of Christianity) by François-René de Chateaubriand
- Natural Theology or Evidences of the Existence and Attributes of the Deity (1802) by William Paley
- Introduction to the Critical Study and Knowledge of the Holy Scriptures by Thomas H. Horne
- Testimony of the Evangelists, Examined by the Rules of Evidence Administered in Courts of Justice (1846) by Simon Greenleaf
- Apologia Pro Vita Sua (1864) by John Henry Newman
- Christian Evidences (1837) by Richard Whately
- The Evidences of the Christian Religion (1832) by Archibald Alexander

== 20th century ==
- Heretics (1905) by G. K. Chesterton
- Why is Christianity True? Christian Evidences (1905) by Edgar Young Mullins
- Orthodoxy (1908) by G. K. Chesterton
- The Facts of Faith (1910) by Charles Edward Smith
- Who Moved the Stone? (1930) by Albert Henry Ross
- The Everlasting Man (1925) by G. K. Chesterton
- The Problem of Pain (1940) by C. S. Lewis
- The Case for Christianity (1942) by C. S. Lewis
- Miracles (book) (1947) by C. S. Lewis
- De Revelatione per Ecclesiam Catholicam proposita (English: On Divine Revelation: The Teaching of the Catholic Faith) (1950) by Réginald Garrigou-Lagrange
- Mere Christianity (1952) by C. S. Lewis
- Protestant Christian Evidences (1953) by Bernard Ramm
- La Phénomène Humain (English: The Phenomenon of Man) (1959) by Pierre Teilhard de Chardin
- Defense of the Faith (1955) by Cornelius Van Til
- Faith That Makes Sense (1960) by J. Edwin Orr
- 100 Questions About God (1966) by J. Edwin Orr
- Jesus: The Man That Lives (1975) by Malcolm Muggeridge
- The Existence of God (1979, new edition 2004) by Richard Swinburne
- Campus Gods on Trial (1964) by Chad Walsh
- Why I Believe (1980) by D J Kennedy
- Eternity in Their Hearts: Startling Evidence of Belief in the One True God in Hundreds of Cultures Throughout the World (1984) by Don Richardson
- The Way the World Is: Christian Perspective of a Scientist (1983) by John Polkinghorne
- What If Jesus Had Never Been Born (1994) by D J Kennedy
- Reasonable Faith (1994) by William Lane Craig
- Is There a God? (1996) by Richard Swinburne
- The Signature of God (1997) by Grant Jeffery
- Beside Still Waters (1998) by Gregg Easterbrook
- The Case for Christ (1998) by Lee Strobel
- What If the Bible Had Never Been Written? (1998) by D J Kennedy
- Science and Theology (1998) by John Polkinghorne
- The New Evidence That Demands A Verdict (1999) by Josh McDowell
- What Did Jesus Mean? (1999) by Ron Rhodes

== 21st century ==
- A Scientific Theology (2001) by Alister McGrath
- Faith, Science and Understanding (2001) by John Polkinghorne
- The Resurrection of God Incarnate (2003) by Richard Swinburne
- The Resurrection of the Son of God (Christian Origins and the Question of God, Vol. 3) (2003) by N. T. Wright
- The Twilight of Atheism: The Rise and Fall of Disbelief in the Modern World (2004) by Alister McGrath
- I Don't Have Enough Faith to Be an Atheist (2004) by Norman Geisler and Frank Turek
- Dawkins' God: Genes, Memes, and the Meaning of Life (2005) by Alister McGrath
- Skeptics Answered (2005) by D J Kennedy
- Why the Ten Commandments Matter (2005) by D J Kennedy
- The Language of God: A Scientist Presents Evidence for Belief (2006) by Francis Collins
- Exploring Reality (2006) by John Polkinghorne
- God's Undertaker: Has Science Buried God? (2007) by John Lennox
- Was Jesus God? (2008) by Richard Swinburne
- The Reason for God: Belief in Age of Skepticism (2008) by Timothy Keller
- What's So Great About Christianity (2008) by Dinesh D'Souza
- Atheist Delusions: The Christian Revolution and Its Fashionable Enemies (2009) by David Bentley Hart
- Questions of Truth (2009) by John Polkinghorne
- More Than A Carpenter (1977, revised 2009) by Josh McDowell
- Life After Death: The Evidence (2009) by Dinesh D'Souza
- God's Philosophers: How the Medieval World Laid the Foundations of Modern Science (2009) by James Hannam ISBN 978-1848310704
- The Dawkins Delusion? Atheist Fundamentalism and the Denial of the Divine (2010) by Alister McGrath
- The Resurrection of Jesus: A New Historiographical Approach (2010) by Michael R. Licona ISBN 978-0-8308-2719-0.
- The Rage Against God (subtitle in US editions: How Atheism Led Me to Faith) (2010) by Peter Hitchens
- Christian Apologetics: A Comprehensive Case For Biblical Faith (2011) by Douglas Groothuis
- Who Is Jesus?: Linking the Historical Jesus with the Christ of Faith (2012) by Darrell L. Bock
- Exposing Myths About Christianity: A Guide to Answering 145 Viral Lies and Legends (2012) by Jeffrey Russell ISBN 978-0830834662
- OrganicJesus: Finding Your Way to an Unprocessed, Gmo-free Christianity (2016) by Scott Douglas ISBN 978-0825443923
- Urban Apologetics (2021) by Eric Mason

== Biblical apologetics ==
- Lines of Defence of the Biblical Revelation (1901) by David Samuel Margoliouth
- A Scientific Investigation of the Old Testament (1926) by Robert Dick Wilson
- Encyclopedia of Bible Difficulties (1982) by Gleason Archer Jr.
- The Historical Reliability of the Gospels (1987) by Craig Blomberg
- The Historical Reliability of the New Testament: The Challenge to Evangelical Christian Beliefs (2016) by Craig Blomberg

== See also ==
- Bibliography of books critical of Christianity
- Bibliography of books critical of Islam
- Bibliography of books critical of Judaism
- Bibliography of books critical of Mormonism
- Bibliography of books critical of Scientology
- List of apologetic works
- List of Islamic apologetic works
- Christian apologetics
- Biblical apologetics
