= Bibliography of books critical of Christianity =

This is a bibliography of literature treating the topic of criticism of Christianity, sorted by source publication and the author's last name.

== Books by author ==
=== A–L ===
- Chinua Achebe. Things Fall Apart
- Ismail al-Faruqi. Christian Ethics: A Historical and Systematic Analysis of Its Dominant Ideas (1967)
- John M. Allegro. The Dead Sea Scrolls and the Christian Myth
- Dan Barker. Godless (Ulysses Press 2008)
- Baron d'Holbach. Christianity Unveiled
- Richard Dawkins. The Greatest Show on Earth
- Richard Dawkins. The God Delusion
- Richard Dawkins. The Blind Watchmaker
- Daniel Dennett. Breaking the Spell: Religion as a Natural Phenomenon
- Karlheinz Deschner, Criminal History of Christianity
- Earl Doherty. The Jesus Puzzle
- Albert Einstein. Out of my later years and the World as I see it
- J. Harold Ellens. The Destructive Power of Religion: Violence in Judaism, Christianity and Islam Praeger Publishers. ISBN 0-275-99708-1.
- Israel Finkelstein. David and Solomon
- Charles Freeman. The Closing of the Western Mind
- Timothy Freke. The Jesus Mysteries
- Sigmund Freud. Civilization and its discontents
- Sigmund Freud. Future of an illusion
- Matilda Joslyn Gage (1997). Woman, church and state: A historical account of the status of woman through the Christian ages, with reminiscences of the matriarchate
- Louis Jacolliot (2014). The Bible in India
- Sam Harris, Letter to a Christian Nation
- Sam Harris. The End of Faith
- Christopher Hitchens. The Missionary Position: Mother Teresa in Theory and Practice
- Christopher Hitchens. God Is Not Great
- Christopher Hitchens. The Portable Atheist
- Max Jammer. Einstein and Religion
- John J. Collins Does the Bible Justify Violence? Minneapolis: Fortress, 2004.
- Henry Charles Lea. The Inquisition of the Middle Ages
- John W. Loftus, Why I Became an Atheist: A Former Preacher Rejects Christianity. Prometheus Books, 2008

=== M–Z ===
- Magnus Magnusson, BC: The Archaeology of the Bible Lands (Bodley Head 1977)
- Rajiv Malhotra, Breaking India: Western Interventions in Dravidian and Dalit Faultlines (Publisher: Amaryllis; ISBN 978-8-191-06737-8)
- Michael Martin, The Case Against Christianity
- Joseph McCabe, A Rationalist Encyclopaedia: A book of reference on religion, philosophy, ethics and science, Gryphon Books (1971).
- C. Dennis McKinsey, The encyclopedia of Biblical errancy
- Friedrich Nietzsche, The Antichrist
- Catherine Nixey, The Darkening Age: The Christian Destruction of the Classical World
- Michel Onfray, Atheist Manifesto
- Thomas Paine, The Age of Reason
- Herman Philipse, God in the Age of Science?
- Robert M. Price, The case against the case for Christ (American atheist press 2010)
- Robert M. Price, The reason driven life (Prometheus Books, 2006)
- Bertrand Russell, Why I am not a Christian
- Carl Sagan, The Varieties of Scientific Experience: A Personal View of the Search for God
- Arun Shourie, Harvesting our souls: Missionaries, their design, their claims. New Delhi: Rupa.
- Arun Shourie, Missionaries in India: Continuities, changes, dilemmas. New Delhi: Rupa.
- Arun Shourie, Arun Shourie and his Christian critic (1995).
- Baruch Spinoza, Tractatus Theologico-Politicus (TTP) (1670)
- Victor J. Stenger, God: The Failed Hypothesis
- Tianxia diyi shangxin ren (天下第一傷心人; 'The World's Most Heartbroken Man'). Bixie jishi. 1861.
- Mark Twain, Letters from the Earth
- G. A. Wells, The Historical Evidence for Jesus (Prometheus Books, 1988)

== See also ==
- Bibliography of books critical of Islam
- Bibliography of books critical of Judaism
- Bibliography of books critical of Mormonism
- Bibliography of books critical of Scientology
- List of apologetic works
- List of Christian apologetic works
- List of Islamic apologetic works
