= Bibliography of books critical of Mormonism =

This is a bibliography of literature treating the topic of criticism of Mormonism (also known as the Latter Day Saint movement (LDS)), sorted by alphabetical order of titles.

In September 1993, six LDS Church members known as the "September Six" were excommunicated or disfellowshipped by the church, allegedly for publishing scholarly work against or criticising church doctrine or leadership.

== Books by title ==
- Black and Mormon (2004) edited by Newell G. Bringhurst and Darron T. Smith
- The Challenge of the Cults and New Religions (2001), a general Christian countercult book with a chapter on Mormonism by Ron Rhodes
- An Insider's View of Mormon Origins (2002) by Grant H. Palmer, who was disfellowshipped for its publication in 2004
- Joseph Smith and the Origins of the Book of Mormon (1985, 2000) by David Persuitte
- The Kingdom of the Cults (1965), a general Christian countercult book with a chapter on Mormonism by Walter Ralston Martin
- Latter-day Dissent: At the Crossroads of Intellectual Inquiry and Ecclesiastical Authority (2011) by Philip Lindholm
- "The LDS Intellectual Community and Church Leadership: A Contemporary Chronology" in Dialogue: A Journal of Mormon Thought (1993) by Lavina Fielding Anderson, which led to her excommunication as one of the September Six
- The Mormon Prophet and His Harem (1866), a biography of Brigham Young by Catharine Van Valkenburg Waite
- Mormonism Unvailed (1834) by Eber D. Howe
- Mormonism: Shadow or Reality? (1963) by Jerald and Sandra Tanner
- No Man Knows My History: The Life of Joseph Smith (1945) by Fawn M. Brodie
- The Rocky Mountain Saints: A Full and Complete History of the Mormons (1873) by T. B. H. Stenhouse
- Secret Ceremonies: A Mormon Woman's Intimate Diary of Marriage and Beyond (1993) by Deborah Laake
- Under the Banner of Heaven: A Story of Violent Faith (2003) by Jon Krakauer
- Utah and the Mormons (1854) by Benjamin G. Ferris
- Wife No. 19 (1876) by Ann Eliza Young, one of the wives of Brigham Young
- Women and Authority: Re-emerging Mormon Feminism (1992) by Lavina Fielding Anderson and D. Michael Quinn (September Six)

== See also ==
- Bibliography of books critical of Christianity
- Bibliography of books critical of Islam
- Bibliography of books critical of Judaism
- Bibliography of books critical of Scientology
- List of apologetic works
- List of Christian apologetic works
- List of Islamic apologetic works
