= Bibliography of books critical of Islam =

Bibliography

This is a bibliography of literature treating the topic of criticism of Islam, sorted by source publication and the author's last name.

== General ==
- Bostom, Andrew. (2008) The Legacy of Jihad, Prometheus Books. ISBN 978-1-59102-602-0
- Bat Ye'or (2001) Islam and Dhimmitude: Where Civilizations Collide, Madison, N.J.: Fairleigh Dickinson University Press. ISBN 0-8386-3942-9
- Harris, Sam. (2004) The End of Faith: Religion, Terror, and the Future of Reason, W.W.Norton. ISBN 0-7432-6809-1
- Harris Sam, Maajid Nawaz, Islam and the Future of Tolerance (2015)
- Hitchens, Christopher (2007). God Is Not Great: How Religion Poisons Everything, New York: Twelve Books, ISBN 9780446579803. (Chapter nine assesses the religion of Islam)
- Manji, Irshad. (2004), The Trouble with Islam, Vintage Canada, ISBN 0-679-31361-3
- Pipes, Daniel (1983). In the Path of God: Islam and Political Power, Transaction Publishers. ISBN 0-7658-0981-8
- Pipes, Daniel. The Rushdie Affair: The Novel, the Ayatollah, and the West (1990), Transaction Publishers, paperback (2003) ISBN 0-7658-0996-6
- Spencer, Robert. The Truth About Muhammad: Founder of the World's Most Intolerant Religion, Regnery Press, 2006 (NYT bestseller list – 2006-10-29) ISBN 1-59698-028-1
- Spencer, Robert. The Politically Incorrect Guide to Islam (And the Crusades), Regnery Press, 2005. (NYT bestseller list – 2005-10-16) ISBN 0-89526-013-1
- Spencer, Robert. The Myth of Islamic Tolerance: How Islamic Law Treats Non-Muslims (editor), Prometheus Books, 2005. ISBN 1-59102-249-5
- Spencer, Robert. Onward Muslim Soldiers: How Jihad Still Threatens America and the West, Regnery Publishing, 2003. ISBN 0-89526-100-6

== Criticism of Islamic texts ==
- Ibn Warraq. The Origins of The Koran: Classic Essays on Islam's Holy Book, edited by Ibn Warraq, Prometheus Books, 1998, hardcover, 420 pages, ISBN 1-57392-198-X
- Ibn Warraq. The Quest for the Historical Muhammad, edited and translated by Ibn Warraq, Prometheus Books, 2000, hardcover, 554 pages, ISBN 1-57392-787-2
- Ibn Warraq. What the Koran Really Says: Language, Text, and Commentary, edited and translated by Ibn Warraq, Prometheus Books, 2002, 600 pages, ISBN 1-57392-945-X

== Literature and plays ==
- Teaching of Jacob (634-640)
- Jihad! The Musical
- Dayananda, S., & Bharadwaja, C. (1915). Light of truth : Or an English translation of the Satyarth Prakash, the well-known work. Allahabad: Arya Pratinidhi Sabha. (Chapter 14)
- Nasrin, Taslima: Lajja (1997). Shame: A Novel. Kankabati Datta (translation of Lajja). Amherst: Prometheus Books. ISBN 1-57392-165-3.
- Padmanābha, ., & Bhatnagar, V. S. (1991). Kānhaḍade prabandha: India's greatest patriotic saga of medieval times : Padmanābha's epic account of Kānhaḍade.
- Rushdie, Salman. The Satanic Verses.
- Voltaire, (1736) Mahomet

== Autobiographical and travelogues ==
- Maajid Nawaz: Radical: My Journey out of Islamist Extremism
- Ibn Warraq. Leaving Islam: Apostates Speak Out, edited by Ibn Warraq, Prometheus Books, 2003, hardcover, 320 pages, ISBN 1-59102-068-9
- ibn Warraq (1995). "Why I Am Not a Muslim", Prometheus Books. ISBN 0-87975-984-4
- Darwish, Nonie (2006) Now They Call Me Infidel, Sentinel. ISBN 978-1-59523-031-7
- V. S. Naipaul (1981). Among the Believers: An Islamic Journey, Knoph. ISBN 978-0-394-50969-3
- V. S. Naipaul (1998). Beyond Belief: Islamic Excursions Among the Converted Peoples.

== Women and Islam ==
- Bellil, Samira, To Hell and Back: The Life of Samira Bellil. Trans. Bison Books 2008
- Sushmita Banerjee (1999). Kabuliwala's Bengalee wife. Calcutta: Bhasa o Sahitya.
- Skaine, R. (2002). The women of Afghanistan under the Taliban. Jefferson, N.C: McFarland.
- Laṭīfa, ., & Hachemi, C. (2007). My forbidden face: Growing up under the Taliban; a young woman's story. London: Virago.
- Shaikh, Anwar (1999). Islam: Sex and violence. Cardiff: Principality Publishers.
- Durrani, T., Hoffer, W., & Hoffer, M. (1998). My feudal lord:A Devastating Indictment of Women's Role in Muslim Society. London: Corgi Books.
- Ali, Ayaan Hirsi (2002 in Dutch) De zoontjesfabriek. Over vrouwen, islam en integratie Uitgeverij Augustus ISBN 9789045703558
- Ali, Ayaan Hirsi (2015) Heretic: Why Islam Needs a Reformation Now, Harper Publications. ISBN 978-0-06-233393-3
- Ali, Ayaan Hirsi (2006 in English) The Caged Virgin: An Emancipation Proclamation for Women and Islam ISBN 978-0-7432-8833-0
- Ali, Ayaan Hirsi (2007 in English) Infidel: My Life ISBN 0-7432-9503-X
- Ali, Ayaan Hirsi (2010) Nomad: From Islam to America: A Personal Journey Through the Clash of Civilizations ISBN 978-1-4391-5731-2
- Nasrin, Taslima (2002). My Bengali Girlhood. Gopa Majumdar (trans.). South Royalton: Steerforth Press. ISBN 1-58642-051-8. Trans. of Meyebela
- Swarup, Ram: Woman in Islam (1994) ISBN 8185990166
- Sultan, Wafa, (2009) A God Who Hates: The Courageous Woman Who Inflamed the Muslim World Speaks Out Against the Evils of Islam, St. Martin's Press, ISBN 978-0-312-53835-4
- Koofi, F., & Ghouri, N. (2012). The favored daughter: One woman's fight to lead Afghanistan into the future. Basingstoke: Palgrave Macmillan.
- Yousafzai, M., Lamb, C., & Panjabi, A. (2013). I Am Malala: The Story of the Girl Who Stood Up for Education and was Shot by the Taliban.
- Wahab, S. (2013). In my father's country: An afghan woman defies her fate. New York: Crown.
- Ahmedi, F., Ansary, M. T., & Ahmedi, F. (2008). The other side of the sky: A memoir. New York: Simon Spotlight Entertainment.

== By continent ==
=== Asia ===
==== South Asia ====
- Aziz, K. K. (2010). The Murder of History: A critique of history textbooks used in Pakistan. Lahore: Sang-e-Meel Publ.
- Goel, Sita Ram The Calcutta Quran Petition by Chandmal Chopra and Sita Ram Goel (1986, enlarged 1987 and again 1999) ISBN 81-85990-58-1
- Lal, K. S. The Legacy of Muslim Rule in India. New Delhi, Aditya Prakashan, 1992.
- Lal, K. S. Theory and Practice of Muslim State in India (1999) ISBN 81-86471-72-3
- Sarkar, Jadunath: History of Aurangzib (1972)
- Swarup, Ram: Hindu View of Christianity and Islam (1993)
- Shourie, Arun & Goel, S. R., (1991). Hindu Temples: What Happened to Them. New Delhi: Voice of India. (1990 vol.1 ISBN 81-85990-49-2; 1991 vol.2 ISBN 81-85990-03-4, enlarged 1993)
- Shourie, Arun: Eminent Historians: Their Technology, Their Line, Their Fraud (1998, ISBN 81-900199-8-8)

==== West Asia ====
- Lewis, Bernard (2001). What Went Wrong?: The Clash Between Islam and Modernity in the Middle East, Oxford University Press. ISBN 978-0-19-514420-8
- Schwartz, Stephen (2002). The Two Faces of Islam: The House of Sa'ud from Tradition to Terror, Doubleday. ISBN 0-385-50692-9

=== Europe ===
- Blankley, Tony, The West's Last Chance: Will We Win the Clash of Civilizations?, Washington, D.C., Regnery Publishing, Inc., 2005-02-25, ISBN 0-89526-015-8
- Fallaci, Oriana, The Force of Reason, New York, Rizzoli International, 2006 ISBN 0-8478-2753-4
- Lindhout, A., & Corbett, S. (2014). A House in the Sky: A memoir.
- Houellebecq, Michel, Soumission, 2015
- Phillips, Melanie (2006). Londonistan: How Britain is creating a terror state within. London: Encounter books. ISBN 978-1-59403-144-1, ISBN 1-59403-144-4

=== North America ===
- Pipes, Daniel (2002). Militant Islam Reaches America, W.W. Norton & Company. ISBN 0-393-32531-8

== Reports ==
- David Lagerlöf, Jonathan Leman, Alexander Bengtsson (2011). "The Anti-Muslim Environment - The ideas, the Profiles and the Concept" (PDF). Archived from the original (PDF) on 2012-05-03. (306 KB), Expo Research
- Alexander Meleagrou-Hitchens, Hans Brun, A Neo-Nationalist Network: The English Defence League and Europe's Counter-Jihad Movement, International Centre for the Study of Radicalisation and Political Violence, March 2013

== See also ==
- Bibliography of books critical of Christianity
- Bibliography of books critical of Judaism
- Bibliography of books critical of Mormonism
- Bibliography of books critical of Scientology
- List of apologetic works
- List of Christian apologetic works
- List of Islamic apologetic works
