= Bibliography of books critical of Judaism =

This is a bibliography of literature treating the topic of criticism of Judaism as a religion, sorted by alphabetical order of titles.

Books that criticise the religion of Judaism can be categorised in several groups, such as:

- Books that criticise the Torah / Hebrew Bible and other Jewish scriptures, or a Jewish fundamentalist interpretation and application of them;
- Books that criticise the Jewish religion as a whole;
- Books that criticise all religions (especially the Abrahamic religions), including Judaism in particular; and
- Books that criticise social separatism of Jewish minority communities, and argue for (voluntary or involuntary) Jewish assimilation (religiously, linguistically, socially, or culturally).

Books that are critical of Judaism can be written by non-Jews (Gentiles) or by Jews themselves, such as Jewish secularists, Jewish atheists and Jewish assimilationists.

== Books by title ==
- The Age of Reason (1794, 1795, 1807) by Thomas Paine, critical of all religions; Judaism and Christianity in particular
- Atheist Manifesto: The Case Against Christianity, Judaism, and Islam (2005) by Michel Onfray, critical of all religions; Christianity, Judaism and Islam in particular
- God and Sex (2010) by Michael Coogan, critical of the Hebrew Bible, and Christian and Jewish fundamentalist interpretations and applications of it
- The God Delusion (2006) by Richard Dawkins, critical of all religions; Christianity, Judaism and Islam in particular
- God Is Not Great (2007) by Christopher Hitchens, critical of all religions; Christianity, Judaism and Islam in particular
- God's Zeal: The Battle of the Three Monotheisms (2007) by Peter Sloterdijk, critical of Christianity, Judaism and Islam in particular
- Jewish Fundamentalism in Israel (1994) by Israel Shahak and Norton Mezvinsky, critical of Jewish fundamentalism
- Jewish History, Jewish Religion (1994) by Israel Shahak, critical of Judaism in general and Jewish fundamentalism (Orthodox Judaism) in particular
- The Jewish Question (1843) by Bruno Bauer, critical of Jewish separatism and arguing for Jews to convert to Christianity in order to assimilate
- On the Jewish Question (1844) by Karl Marx in response to Bauer's 1843 book, critical of Jewish separatism, but arguing for voluntary assimilation without a need to become Christians (first)
- Tractatus Theologico-Politicus (1670) by Baruch Spinoza, critical of all religions; Judaism and Christianity in particular. Critical of Jewish separatism.
- Unorthodox: The Scandalous Rejection of My Hasidic Roots (2012) by Deborah Feldman, critical of Jewish fundamentalism and Jewish separatism
- When Will Jesus Bring the Pork Chops? (2004) by George Carlin, critical of Christianity, Judaism and Islam in particular

== See also ==
- Bibliography of books critical of Christianity
- Bibliography of books critical of Islam
- Bibliography of books critical of Scientology
- List of apologetic works
- List of Christian apologetic works
- List of Islamic apologetic works
