= Whiskey N' Rye =

- Origin: Seattle, Washington, United States
- Genres: Roots rock, blues rock
- Years active: 2013–present
- Label: Echo Boom Records
- Members: Philip Lindholm; Carson Dent; Alex Atwood; Marco Longo; Greg Pascale
- Website: Official website

Whiskey N' Rye is an American roots rock band out of Seattle, Washington, United States, known for its explosive live show. The band was formed in 2013 by singer/songwriter Philip Lindholm, and has since released two albums to critical acclaim.

== History ==
Whiskey N' Rye's first album was the eponymously titled album Whiskey N' Rye, released on March 28, 2014. The album featured the single "Bootlegger," which was picked up on AAA radio across the country. The band was thereafter invited to perform on Blues To Do television, at the House of Blues in Hollywood, and do an in-studio with Bob Rivers on Seattle's 95.7 KJR-FM. These performances led to Whiskey N' Rye's music appearing across popular television shows, including The Real World and Keeping up with the Kardashians.

== Band members ==
- Philip Lindholm — vocals and guitar
- Greg Pascale — guitars
- Marco Longo — keys
- Alex Atwood — bass
- Carson Dent — drums
