= Muhammad Mohar Ali =

British Bangladeshi historian and Islamic scholar (1929–2007)

- মোহাম্মদ মোহর আলী
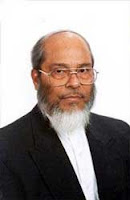
- Born: 1929; Khulna, Bengal Presidency, British India
- Died: 11 April 2007 (aged 77–78); Essex, United Kingdom
- Education: SOAS University of London
- Occupations: Historian, Islamic scholar
- Years active: 1954-2007
- Awards: King Faisal International Prize

Muhammad Mohar Ali (Bengali: মোহাম্মদ মোহার আলী); 1929–2007) was a British Bangladeshi lecturer, historian, barrister and Islamic scholar. He is the only Bengali to have received the King Faisal International Prize.

== Biography ==
Ali was born in 1929 in Khulna in Bengal. He had an elder brother. Their father, a landowner and small businessman, died when Ali was about five or six years old.

Ali joined the Hooghly Madrasah in 1944-45. The next year, as a member of the All Bengal Muslim Students League, he was elected general secretary of the school's student union. He canvassed for Muslim League candidates in the run up to the 1946 Indian Constituent Assembly election. He married and had three sons.

Studying at Dhaka University, he obtained a degree in history in 1952 and a master's degree in 1953. After that he taught history at various colleges. They included Michael Madhusudan College in Jessore (1954-55), Dacca Government College (1955-56), Chittagong Government College (1956–57) and Rajshahi Government College (1957). He joined the faculty of the history department of Dhaka University in 1958. He wrote his first five books between 1954 and 1960.

In 1960, he was admitted to SOAS, University of London. There he received a Ph.D. in 1963 for his dissertation The Bengali reaction to Christian missionary activities 1833-1857. He simultaneously studied law at Lincoln's Inn and was called to the bar in 1964. In March, he returned to Dhaka University where he taught history. He was also a member of the East Pakistan Education Commission and a member of the Pakistan Historical Records Commission. In October 1969, he returned to the UK for a year on a Nuffield Fellowship.

Ali was committed to the idea of a unified Pakistan. He backed the Pakistani government's position of opposing the independence of East Pakistan. After the rebels won the Bangladesh Liberation War, one of his sons was murdered during the violent backlash against those who had been pro-Pakistan. Ali was imprisoned for his stance until the general amnesty in 1974. The next year, he and his family moved to Britain as political refugees. He moved in 1976 to Saudi Arabia. There he taught Islamic history at Imam Muhammad ibn Saud Islamic University in Riyadh for 12 years, followed by 7 years of teaching at the Islamic University of Madinah. He worked then as a researcher at the King Fahd Complex for the Printing of the Holy Qur'an in the years 1415–16 AH. His university teaching career lasted for more than 40 years.

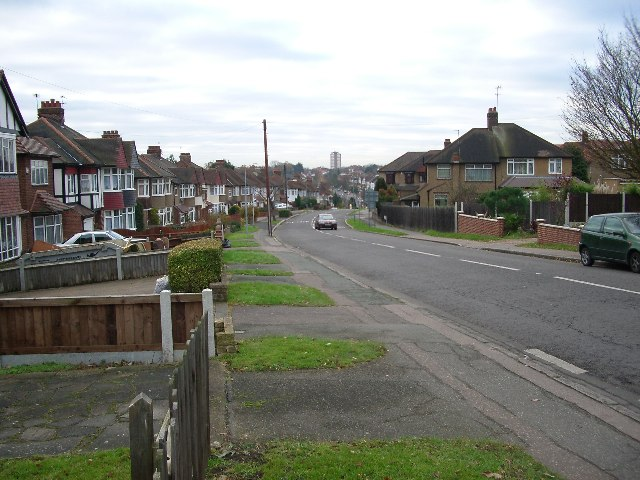
Woodford, Essex, in 2005

Ali died at his home in Woodford, Essex on 11 April 2007.

== Author ==
Ali was a specialist in Islamic history – in particular the history of Bengal. His book, History of the Muslims of Bengal, is considered an important reference in the history of the propagation of Islam in the region and its cultural and political effects. It also deals with the struggle of Bengali Muslims against the British colonial rule, and the Islamic influence on Bengali architecture and literature.

His other books deal with the Islamic rule in India in the 19th century, Islam and the Modern world, the history of the Indian subcontinent, the Bengali reaction to Christian missionaries, in addition to articles in specialist magazines and conference participation in Bangladesh, Pakistan, the UK and the US.

Ali won the King Faisal International Prize for Islamic Studies in 2000.

While most of his books and essays are in English, he has translated Jawhart al-Bukhari from Arabic into Bengali and published a word for word English translation of the Qur'an in addition to Arabic essays such as Orientalists' Claims concerning the Glorious Qur'an.

He has also written books in response to the Orientalists' approach to the biography of Muhammad and their theories about the Qur'an: Sirat Al-Nabi and the Orientalists (1997) and The Qur'an and the Orientalists (2004).

== Main works ==
- Ali, Muhammad Mohar (1954). A brief survey of Muslim Rule in India. Dacca: United Book Exchange. OCLC 21940958.
- —— (1960). An Outline of Ancient Indo-Pak History. Khulna: Muhammad Mokhles Ali. OCLC 6613624.
- —— (1965). The Bengali Reaction to Christian Missionary Activities, 1833–1857. Chittagong: Mehrub Publications. OCLC 220487450.
- —— (1975). The Fall of Sirajuddaulah. Chittagong: Mehrub Publications. OCLC 500154124.
- —— (1985). History of the Muslims of Bengal. Riyadh: Imam Muhammad ibn Saud Islamic University. OCLC 19887901.
- —— (1997). Sirat al-nabi and the Orientalists. Madinah, Saudi Arabia: King Fahd Complex for the Printing of the Holy Qurʼan. ISBN 9960-770-68-0.
- —— (2003). A Word for Word Meaning of the Qur'an. Ipswich, Suffolk: Jamiat Ihyaa Minhaaj al-Sunnah. OCLC 660023946.
- —— (2004). The Qur'an and the Orientalists: An Examination of their Main Theories and Assumptions. Ipswich, Suffolk: Jamiat Ihyaa Minhaaj al-Sunnah. ISBN 0-9540369-7-2.
