= Griffith John =

Welsh Christian missionary (1831-1912)

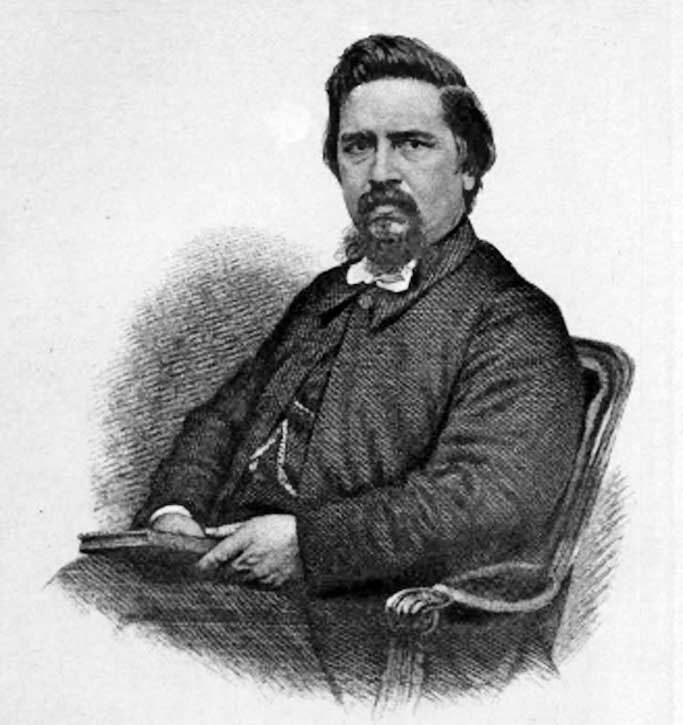
- Born: 14 December 1831; Swansea, Wales
- Died: 18 April 1912 (aged 80); Swansea, Wales
- Occupation: Christian missionary to China

Griffith John (Chinese: 楊格非; pinyin: Yáng Géfēi; 14 December 1831 – 18 April 1912) was a Welsh Christian missionary and translator in China. A member of the Congregational church, he was a pioneer evangelist with the London Missionary Society (LMS), a writer and a translator of the Holy Bible into the Chinese language.

== Biography ==
Griffith John was born on 14 December 1831 at Swansea, in south Wales. He was brought up as a Christian in the Congregational tradition, and in 1840 at the age of eight was admitted to full membership of Ebenezer Congregational church, Swansea. When only fourteen he delivered his first sermon at a prayer meeting; at sixteen he became a regular preacher and was known as "boy preacher." He was subsequently trained at the Brecon Congregational Memorial College for the ministry, and then at the Bedford Academy.

In 1853 he offered his services to the London Missionary Society and after two years' training was ordained in 1855 at Ebenezer, Swansea. That same year he married his first wife, Margaret Jane, a daughter of the Christian missionary, David Griffiths. After he was ordained, he wanted to serve in Madagascar but was instead persuaded by the London Missionary Society to go to China. The newly wed couple made the voyage to Shanghai arriving in September 1855. Griffith John would serve in China for 55 years, chiefly in Hubei and Hunan.

John made extensive missionary journeys into the interior of China, sometimes traveling over 5,000 km. He was among the first to begin Christian missionary work in the provinces of Hubei (Hupeh), Hunan, and Sichuan (Szechwan). He set up schools, hospitals and training colleges, with a permanent base at Hankou (now part of Wuhan city) in Hubei. In 1861 he went from Shanghai through the provinces of central China, and he later claimed that with his colleagues he had established over 100 mission stations in Hubei and Hunan. A popular and inflammatory 1861 anti-Christian tract entitled Bixie jishi condemned John for his missionary work. In July of that year he had moved to Hankou, which remained his base until his final departure from China in 1912 - although in 1863 he was in neighbouring Wuchang District (now part of Wuhan city), and in 1867 Hanyang District (also now part of Wuhan city).

Griffith John in 1905

Being fluent in Chinese, known as a powerful and eloquent speaker. He trained numerous Chinese evangelists and wrote numerous Christian tracts and served for many years as chairman of the Central China Tract Society.

Mrs John suffered from ill health. In 1870, she and her husband left China for a rare visit to Britain; but in 1873 she died in Singapore during the return voyage. In 1874, John met and married Mrs Jenkins, a missionary's widow. In 1885, his second wife died.

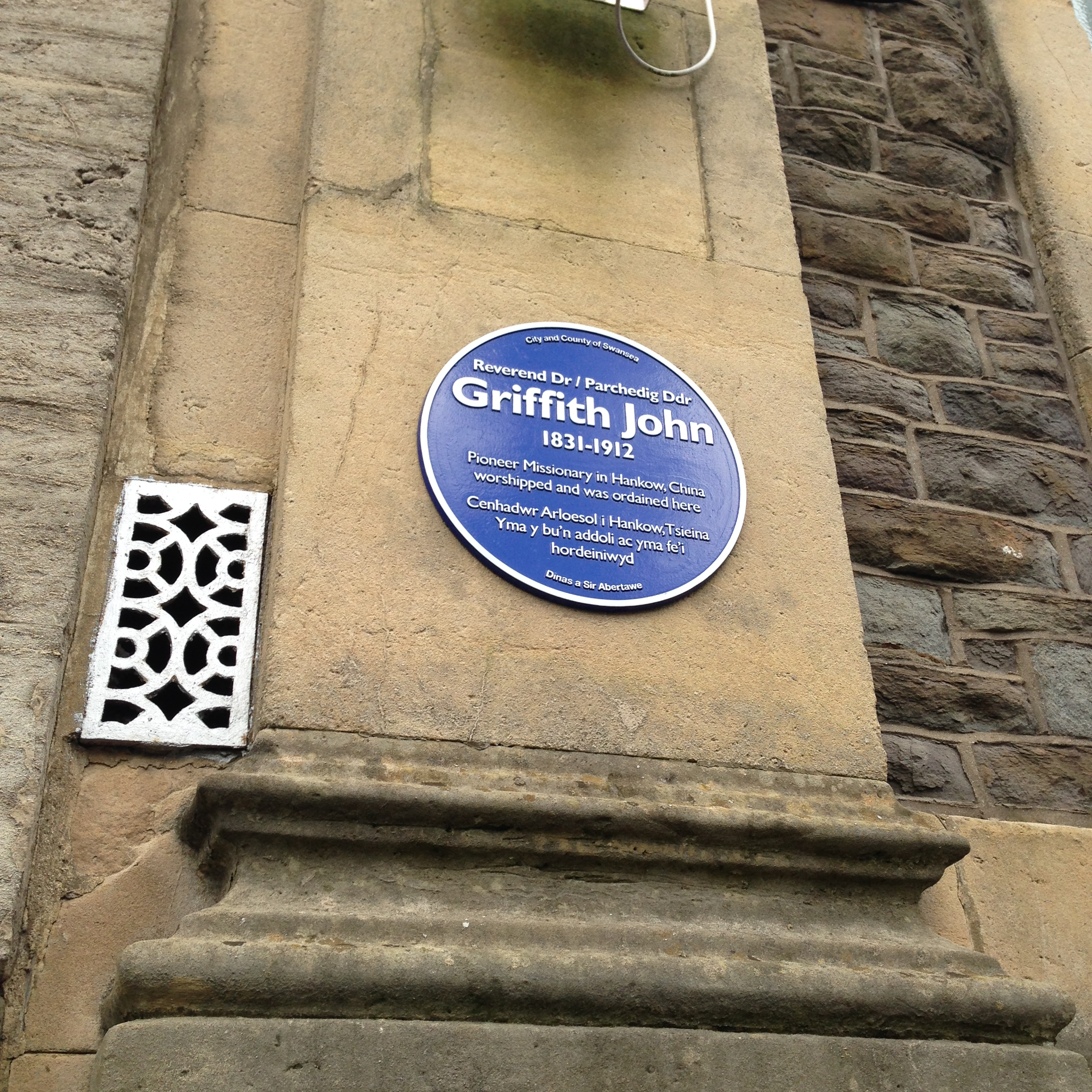
Blue plaque commemorating John in Swansea, Wales

In 1890, he became a founding member of the Permanent Committee for the Promotion of Anti-Opium Societies. Fellow committee members were prominent missionaries John Glasgow Kerr MD, American Presbyterian Mission in Canton; BC Atterbury MD, American Presbyterian Mission in Beijing, Archdeacon Arthur Evans Moule, Church Missionary Society in Shanghai, Henry Whitney MD, American Board of Commissioners for foreign Missions in Fuzhou, the Rev Samuel Clarke, China Inland Mission in Guiyang and the Rev Arthur Gostick Shorrock, English Baptist Mission in Taiyuan. They resolved to continue their opposition to the opium traffic, urging Christians in China to arouse public opinion against it. The desire of the missionaries that their ideas be carried out caused them to form "continuation committees" that were assigned tasks to assure that action would be taken on whatever matters had been approved by the conferences.

John published a New Testament in 1885, using Classical Chinese. He would in 1889 publish a second New Testament translation, this time using Mandarin Chinese. He would continue translating other portions of the Old Testament into Mandarin Chinese, such as Psalms and Proverbs by 1890.

In 1889 he was elected chairman of the Congregational Union of England and Wales, but declined the honour and remained in Hankou among the Chinese whom he loved. In the Yangtze valley he founded a theological college for Chinese preachers, which bears his name. The University of Edinburgh conferred on him the degree of Doctor of Divinity (1889) in recognition of his service to the Chinese.

In 1905 John celebrated his missionary jubilee at Hankou. For health reasons he left China for a short time but returned in 1907. During a career spanning 60 years John left China only three times. Finally returning to Britain in January 1912, he died in Swansea on 18 April that year. Griffith John was buried at Bethel Chapel on Carnglas Road, Sketty in Swansea following a funeral service in Ebenezer Chapel.

== Legacy ==
In 2012, a bust of Griffith John by sculptor Xiang Jinguo was offered to Ebenezer church but placed in Swansea Museum - a gift from the Union Hospital, Wuhan, who established a programme of cooperation with Swansea University's School of Medicine. In September 2013, a blue plaque was unveiled in memory of John outside Ebenezer Chapel, Swansea, where he worshiped as a boy.

== Works ==
- John, Griffith. China: her claims and call. London: Hodder and Stoughton, 1882. (Bodleian Library).
- John, Griffith. Sowing and Reaping: Letters From the Rev. Griffith John. London: London Missionary Society, 1897.
- John, Griffith. A voice from China. London: James Clarke & Co., 1907. (University of Hong Kong Libraries, Digital Initiatives, China Through Western Eyes).

== See also ==
- Protestantism in Sichuan
