= Philip Lindholm =

American singer-songwriter, filmmaker, academic

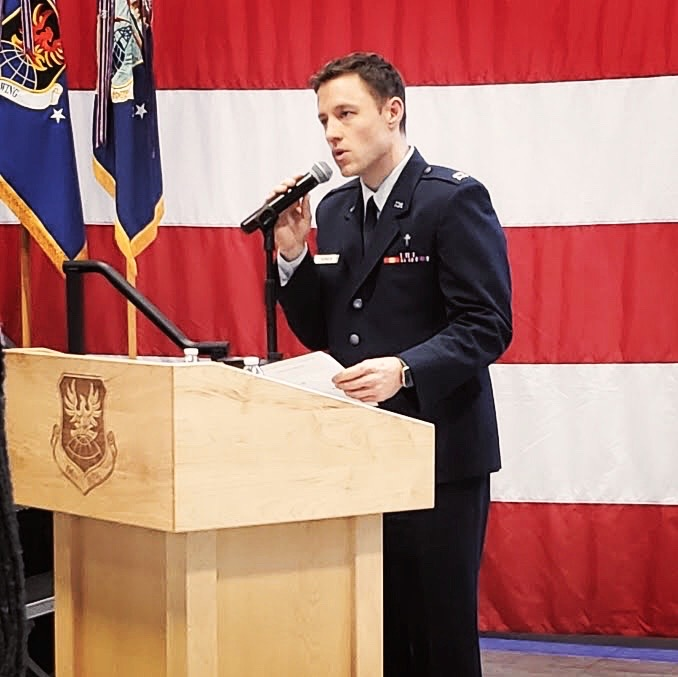
- Philip Lindholm
- Born: December 10; Seattle, Washington, United States

Education
- Doctoral advisor: George Pattison

Philosophical work
- Era: 21st-century philosophy
- Region: Western Philosophy
- Main interests: Philosophical theology, expressivism, aesthetics

Philip Michael Lindholm (born December 10) is an American public servant, singer-songwriter, and academic from Seattle, Washington, United States. He is best known as the author of Latter-day Dissent and for playing the lead role in the BBC's murder mystery Who Murdered Warren Taylor, presenting ITV1's The Grail Trail: In Pursuit of the Da Vinci Code, creating and researching ITV1's The Muslim Jesus, and as the lead singer-songwriter for Whiskey N' Rye. In 2019, Lindholm gave a TEDx talk entitled "The Secret to a Meaningful Life."

== Biography ==
=== Early life and university ===
Dr. Lindholm grew up just outside Seattle. Lindholm left high school and began attending Green River Community College at the age of 17. After receiving an AA degree, Lindholm went on to achieve high honors from Central Washington University and was named State Finalist for the Rhodes Scholarship in his senior year. Lindholm was subsequently offered a place at both Harvard and Oxford universities for graduate study, and accepted a full scholarship to the latter. Lindholm went on to receive three master's degrees, and graduated with a doctorate in philosophical theology from Oxford in 2010. During his graduate study, Lindholm complemented time at Oxford with other institutions, including L'École Normale Supérieure in Paris in 2005 and Juilliard in New York in 2007.

=== Music ===
After Lindholm played small singer/songwriter gigs in England and Paris, he went on to form band Whiskey N' Rye, which released two albums.

=== Film ===
Lindholm studied acting under Amy Werba and Charles Weinstein in Paris in 2005. His debut was in the lead role of the BBC's murder mystery "Who Murdered Warren Taylor" in 2005, and he then appeared in a series of independent films in London, including "Pieces," where he met filmmaker Sean Corbett and joined the sponsoring production company, 24/30 Cinema. Subsequently, while Lindholm lived in Queens, NY between 2006 and 2007, he started working with documentarian Albert Maysles, which segued into further projects with ITV and BBC in 2008-9 and an acting role in Larry Holden's independent film "All Sun and Little White Flowers" that summer. While at ITV, Lindholm created and helped produce the documentary The Muslim Jesus, which was released to wide acclaim.

==== Selected filmography ====
| Year | Film | Role | Notes |
|---|---|---|---|
| 2010 | All Sun and Little White Flowers | "Deputy Barnes" | Independent Feature Film. Male Actor. Director Larry Holden |
| 2009 | History of Christianity | Assistant Producer | BBC Documentary Series |
| 2008 | The Funny Thing About Ramadan | Assistant Producer | BBC1 Documentary Film |
| 2008 | Pieces | Will | Independent Feature Film. Male Lead Actor |
| 2007 | The Muslim Jesus | Creator/Specialist Researcher | ITV1 Documentary Film |
| 2005 | In Pursuit of The Da Vinci Code | Presenter (himself) | ITV1 Documentary Film |
| 2005 | Who Murdered Warren Taylor | Warren Taylor | BBC Murder Mystery. Male Lead Actor |

=== Academics ===
Lindholm is a Kierkegaard scholar and former lecturer in comparative religion at the universities of Washington and Oxford who speaks around the world on philosophical and theological topics. His recent books include Latter-day Dissent, which analyzes the nature and extent of intellectual freedom and disciplinary action in the LDS Church, and Voyeur: Notes of Disquiet, a collection of aphorisms.

==== Selected works ====
- Voyeur: Notes of Disquiet (2012) ISBN 978-0615563749
- Latter-day Dissent (2011) ISBN 1-58958-128-8
- Metallica and Philosophy" chapter: "The Struggle Within: Hetfield, Kierkegaard, and the Pursuit of Authenticity (2007) ISBN 1-4051-6348-8
- Poker and Philosophy" chapter: "Jewish Philosophy Wins the Pot: How Stu Ungar and Emmanuel Levinas Coralled the Texans (2006) ISBN 0-8126-9594-1
