= Jamiat Ihyaa Minhaaj al-Sunnah =

Muslim charity in the United Kingdom

Jamiat Ihyaa Minhaaj al-Sunnah (Movement of the Revival of the Prophet's Way) also JIMAS, is a Muslim charity in the United Kingdom. Its headquarters is in Ipswich. It produces pamphlets, videos, classes, provides speakers, and holds conferences on Islam. It describes itself as "non-sectarian", "homegrown", and "particularly successful at teaching Islam to the youth and carries out a substantial amount of work at universities, colleges and mosques". It has been described by others as "probably the largest Salafi group in Britain".

== History ==
The group was founded in 1984 by a group of four young Muslims studying at the University of Kingston in Surrey who were dissatisfied by what they saw as "a lack of dynamism" in the South Asian ahl-e-Hadith movement in Britain. M. Munawar Ali (Abu Muntasir) has been its head for some years.

Ed Husain describes JIMAS as being known to be Wahhabi, although Gilliat-Ray says the group as providing platforms for prominent Muslim Brotherhood speakers such as Yusuf al-Qaradawi. According to Husain, the group made available speakers on Islam for his college and others: "Black, white, and Asian converts who had studied Islam in Saudi Arabia to live and preach in the UK." The speakers were noted for being "mostly dynamic speakers, able to stir a crowd and plant genuine interest in Islam", their impressive knowledge of "the Quran or the Prophet Mohammed's wisdom", and but their ignoring of the "fourteen centuries of commentary and scholarship on Islam's primary sources", being passionate "about the idea of one God" (tawheed) while "ceaselessly warned against shirk" (polytheism), and for their appearance -- "they covered their heads with the red and white chequered Saudi scarf, ... They had huge, bushy beards and their trousers were very short, just below their knees". The speakers were also known for admonishing the Muslim students for wearing long trousers and listening to music.

After the 9/11 attacks, according to Gilliat-Ray, the group changed its focus, becoming more interested in "grassroots engagement with 'ordinary' British Muslims" and moved away from the salafist ideology. Over the past twenty or so years JIMAS has splintered; mostly dividing over a pro/anti-Saudi dichotomy. Those that stayed loyal to the purist Salafi idea of remaining loyal to the Muslim rulers, such as the Saudi ruling family, formed a group called OASIS (Organization of ahl al Sunnah Islamic Societies) led by Abu Khadeejah and Dawud Burbank which later on became Salafi Publications by the end of 1996.
