= Irshad Ashraf =

British documentary film maker

Irshad Ashraf is a British documentary film maker with a reputation for making stylish, visually innovative documentary films about history, art and politics.

After studying film theory in London in the mid 1990s, Irshad moved to Tokyo to teach English while finding time to make short films and take photographs.

The BBC film network quotes Irshad as saying "My first film happened when I moved to Tokyo for a couple of years in 1997 to teach English. The insidious traingrind of Ridley Scott's grey drizzled dystopia encroached deep inside my head, nag nag nagging away. I realised the power of dreams and, using a friend's camcorder and VCR for editing, made a film about the sensory avalanche that is Tokyo."

Influenced by the work of Terence Malick and Alan Resnais, Irshad's films offset journalistic content with esoteric visual language as reflected in the ITV documentary The Muslim Jesus narrated by Melvyn Bragg which scored eerie images of urban London landscapes with haunting Arabic recitation, and was positively reviewed by critics in the Daily Express, The Observer, The Evening Standard, The Scotsman and The Guardian. He states his greatest influence is fellow documentary maker Bob Brear, a man Irshad describes as "visually visionary, literally brimming over with ideas and joy". He sees the seminal ITV show Bouncers as Brear's greatest work. A series many described as "surreal to the point of genius".

Irshad's work with Melvyn Bragg has included directing The South Bank Show. His film about Peter Kosminsky was described by Richard Rogers in The Observer as "an examination of the art rather than the artist and that again makes it unique." Rogers also praised the opening of the film in the article "There is also no other TV show that Melvyn Bragg (or anyone else) can confidently open by asserting the philosophical theories of Jean Baudrillard. He doesn't even link such theorising to the evening's subject. You have to work it out yourself, which means thinking while you watch" Ashraf's next South Bank Show was about the rock band Elbow which aired in November 2009 and was awarded critic's choice features by The Sunday Mirror, The Guardian and The Independent.

Irshad's past work includes a BBC documentary about Pakistan's entertainment industry, a documentary about rock band Elbow's tour of Cuba in 2004, a Channel 4 documentary about American film director Richard Linklater with presenter Ben Lewis, of which Henrietta Roussoulis of Time Out wrote: "his moments with the man himself are really worth watching. By constantly questioning his questions and doubting his doubts, Lewis attempts to add a Linklater touch to his documentary, a device that gets him nowhere - "I know it's your job to make sense of what I do," the director says, "but ... I don't think it's that interesting" Irshad also made a film about collectors of contemporary art in New York, with Ben Lewis which was positively reviewed by Peter Chapman in The Independent.

Irshad has also featured in front of camera in documentaries. The 2008 BBC 2 film The Funny Thing About Ramadan saw Irshad easing comedian Ayesha Hazarika into the month of Ramadan to comic effect.

Irshad cut his directing teeth in the late 1990s making short films for BBC and ITV. He pioneered the "psychic detective" style of Derek Acorah, making over 25 shorts with the psychic before going on to make shorts for the BBC flagship travel show Holiday.

As a producer he has made Bollywood for Beginners for Channel 4 and developed The Islamic History of Europe for the BBC.

== Selected credits ==
The South Bank Show Elbow Profile of the cult alternative rock band.

The South Bank Show Peter Kosminsky

The Muslim Jesus ITV The lives of Jesus and Mary as narrated in The Quran

Karachi Uncovered BBC Scottish Actor Atta Yaqub investigates Pakistan's media boom

St. Richard of Austin - CHANNEL 4 Film about American Film Director, Richard Linklater. UK Channel 4

Why Do People Buy Art? - Channel 4 Film about New York Art Collectors. UK Channel 4

Director's Debut: Stephen Tompkinson's Story BBC The British TV star directs a BBC drama

elbow:cuba gigs - Film about the British rock band Elbow touring Cuba.

Desi DNA - Arts and Culture Series. BBC

An Islamic History of Europe with Rageh Omaar, feature-length documentary for BBC 4

How to Dump Your Mates CHANNEL 4 Teenagers improve their social circle with the aid of a top psychologist

Taxi Nights - ITV Observational Documentary series about cab drivers in Manchester, England. UK ITV

Bollywood for Beginners - CHANNEL 4 Documentary about mainstream Indian Cinema.

The Holiday Show - BBC Travel Series.
