= G. S. Street =

British critic, journalist and novelist

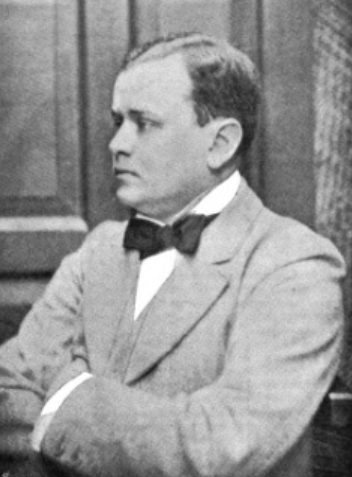
- In The Sketch, 5 December 1894
- Born: George Slythe Street; 18 July 1867; Wimbledon, London, England
- Died: 31 October 1936 (aged 69); London, England
- Education: Charterhouse School; Exeter College, Oxford
- Occupations: Critic, journalist, novelist

George Slythe Street MVO (18 July 1867 – 31 October 1936) was a British critic, journalist and novelist.

== Biography ==
G. S. Street was born in Wimbledon, London on 18 July 1867 and educated at Charterhouse School and Exeter College, Oxford. He was associated with William Ernest Henley and the "counter-Decadents" on the staff of the National Observer. His works were characterized by "whimsy, detachment, sympathy, tenderness, satire, humor, and occasionally cynicism". Street's satirical works assailed "snobbery, hypocrisy, vulgarity, and pretentiousness at all levels of society, especially among the aesthetes and the upper class". He is perhaps best known for his 1894 novel The Autobiography of a Boy, which satirized contemporary aesthetes Oscar Wilde and Lord Alfred Douglas, although Street would later write favorably of Wilde's De Profundis.

Max Beerbohm, a lifelong friend and fellow dandy and wit, wrote that Street's conversation, "delivered in a clear, light and scholarly voice, had the flavor of the best old dry sherry."

In 1914 Street was appointed to the office of the Lord Chamberlain as joint Examiner of Plays with E.A. Bendall. He became sole examiner in 1920.

He died in London on 31 October 1936.

== Bibliography ==
- The Autobiography of a Boy (1894)
- Episodes (1895)
- Miniatures and Moods (1893)
- Quales Ego: a Few Remarks in Particular and at Large (1896)
- The Wise and the Wayward (1896)
- Some Notes of a Struggling Genius (1898)
- The Trial of the Bantocks (1900)
- A Book of Stories (1902)
- A Book of Essays (1902)
- The Views of an Angry Man (1902)
- Great Friends (1905) Three-act comedy produced by the Stage Society.
- Books and Things: a Collection of Stray Remarks (1905)
- The Ghosts of Piccadilly (1907)
- People and Questions (1910)
- On Money and Other Essays (1914)
- The London Assurance, 1720-1920 (1920)

== See also ==
- Orthodoxy (book)
