= Bixie jishi =

1861 Chinese anti-Christian treatise

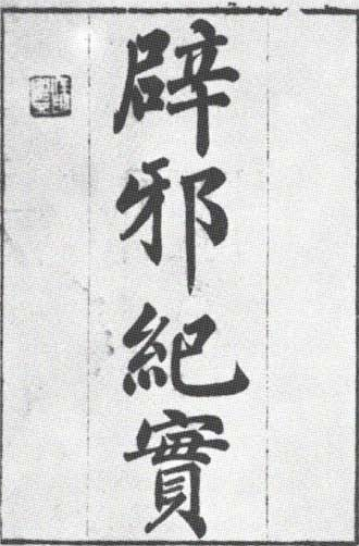
- Cover of the 1861 edition
- Author: Tianxia diyi shangxin ren ('The Most Heartbroken Man in the World')
- Language: Literary Chinese
- Genre: Treatise
- Published: 1861

Bixie jishi (Chinese: 辟邪紀實; pinyin: Bìxié jìshí; lit. 'A Record of Facts to Ward Off Evil') is an 1861 Chinese anti-Christian treatise. It contains various attacks on the activities of Christian missionaries and the supposed doctrines and practices of the religion. Jesus is commonly referred to as 'hog' throughout the work (owing to a Chinese pun), and Christians are described as engaging in sexual deviance and worshiping menstrual blood, while missionaries are said to gouge out the organs of deceased followers. These obscene descriptions are paired with various theological critiques of Christianity and appeals to the Sacred Edict of the Kangxi Emperor.

The tract was written in ornate Literary Chinese by an anonymous Hunan official under the pen name Tianxia diyi shangxin ren (天下第一傷心人; 'The World's Most Heartbroken Man'). The tract spawned several hundred abridged and simplified versions. One was later translated by missionaries and published under the name Death Blow to Corrupt Doctrines. Westerners saw Bixie jishi and its related works as the origins for anti-Christian ideas which culminated in anti-missionary riots and attacks, although it was likely only read by a small group of educated elites.

== Summary ==
First published in 1861, Bixie jishi is an anti-Christian tract containing various attacks on missionaries, with the greatest focus against Catholics. However, the text also attacks the activities of Protestant missionaries, describing the distinction between Catholicism and Protestantism as mentioned in foreign treaties as a ploy by westerners to mislead the Chinese public. It contains various imagined and symbolic criticisms of missionary activities and Christian rituals. Jesus is described as a pig throughout the text: during the 19th century, a common pun associated the Chinese name for Catholicism (天主教; Tiānzhǔjiào, lit. 'the teaching of the Lord of Heaven') with "the squeak of the heavenly pig" (天豬呌; Tiānzhūjiào). Westerners are sometimes depicted as goats due to a pun between "foreign" (洋; yáng) and "goat" (羊; yáng), although they are often described by the epithet guizi (鬼子; '[foreign] devil').

The tract opens with the Sacred Edict of the Kangxi Emperor, which reaffirms Confucian orthodoxy. After this, it lays out what it describes as a summary of Christian religious teachings. The text mentions that following a Sunday Mass, Christians "all give themselves up to indiscriminate sexual intercourse. This is the height of their enjoyment. They call it the 'Great Communion,' or the 'Love-gathering.'"

The author describes priests as invariably castrated in their youth, but mentions that they regularly engage in sodomy (anal and oral sex) with their converts. After mentioning that arranged marriages are uncommon in the west, it claims that brides must sleep with their pastor before they can be married, and that fathers can marry their daughters-in-law and sons can marry their mothers-in-law. Missionaries are depicted as gouging out eyes, organs, and fetuses of deceased followers. This charge against missionaries likely gained traction in the 1840s. Missionaries are described as sorcerers who bewitch Chinese people into becoming Christian through charms and pills, collect the nails and hair of women, and assault young children.

It also alleges within the first section that Christian women hold a higher social status than men due to their ability to menstruate; the author writes "when a woman's period arrives, the barbarians vie with each other to obtain some of her menses and drink it — thus accounting for the unbearable stench which many of them have."

After the first section, the author summarizes the history of Christian activity in China, and gives an excerpt from the 17th-century writer Yang Guangxian's anti-Christian text Budeyi (不得已). This is followed by commentaries on excerpts from various works about Christianity, including both Christian and non-Christian sources. Quoting another pamphlet titled Fengtu Guangwen, the author relays the allegation that all Christian children are groomed for sodomy and that male relatives are expected to engage in sexual intercourse with one another in order to stay connected, commenting that "all such evils are indeed things which [even] beasts do not do".

After this, a section critiques various Christian doctrines in intense detail, focusing more on theological matters than the obscene accusations of the previous portions of the book. A line-by-line critique of the missionary Griffith John is presented, where the author rejects the concepts of the Trinity and the Last Judgment. The final chapter of the book lists around 50 anecdotes about the practices of various Chinese Christians collected from oral and written sources, generally showcasing their supposed sexual impropriety and greed. An appendix to the work details a plan to form a network of anti-Christian militias to drive the religion out of China.

== History ==
Following the Qing dynasty's defeat against the British in the First Opium War of 1839–1842, anti-Western and anti-Christian texts began to be published and circulated, especially within Northern China. These ranged from short flyers and placards to longer manifestos and treatises. These texts differed from earlier anti-Christian tracts which circulated in China during the 17th century. Earlier texts generally focused on issues related to Christian doctrines, while the 19th century tracts focused on exposing the supposed shocking behavior of Christians and missionaries. Events such as the Second Opium War and the 1858 Treaty of Tientsin expanded the popularity of such texts.

One of these longer treatises, Bixie jishi, was published by an anonymous writer in 1861 under the pen name Tianxia diyi shangxin ren (天下第一傷心人; 'The World's Most Heartbroken Man'). The author describes himself as a Hunan official and member of the Armies of the Braves who served in the war against the Christian Taiping Heavenly Kingdom. The author also wrote a treatise on the Gelaohui secret society, likely indicating that he was connected to the Xiang Army commander Zeng Guofan or his colleagues.

Unlike many shorter handbills and pamphlets, which were made in written vernacular Chinese or a simple register of Literary Chinese, Bixie jishi is written in formal Literary Chinese. Like other literary anti-Christian texts, it makes heavy use of anecdotes, names, and references to biblical stories. It was aimed at an educated elite audience as opposed to the general population. The work was so inflammatory that, according to historian Paul Cohen, it was banned in three Chinese provinces.

== Reception and legacy ==
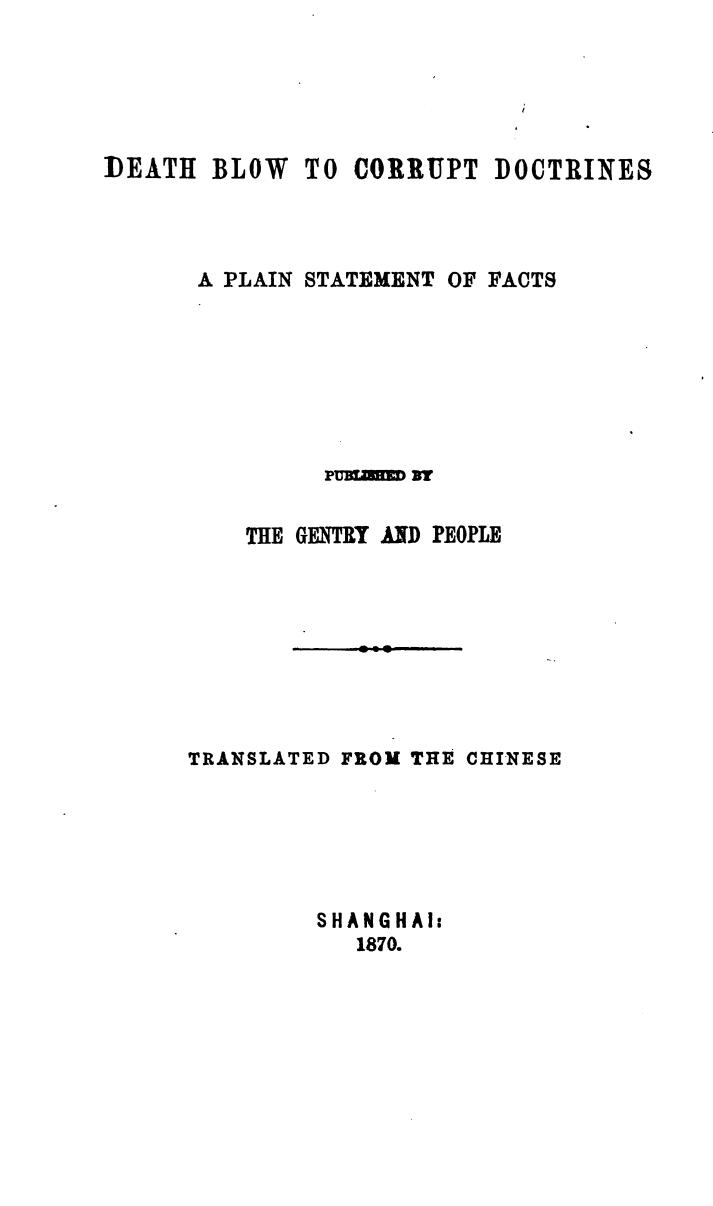
Cover of Death Blow to Corrupt Doctrines, an English translation of one of the tract's abridgments

Several hundred abridged and simplified versions of Bixie jishi were made over the following decades. One popular abridgment was titled Bixie shilu (辟邪實錄; 'A True Record to Ward Off Evil'). A group of Christian missionaries in Shandong translated this version into English in 1870, naming it Death Blow to Corrupt Doctrines. The missionaries described the book as a representation of the "animus of the ruling and literary classes of China towards foreigners", and argued for the importance of allowing foreign audiences to understand the anti-western attitudes expressed in the text.

The Bixie jishi and Bixie shilu gained popularity in the 1870s, corresponding to greater anti-Christian activity. Around 1870, Sir Robert Hart, the inspector-general of the Chinese Maritime Customs Service, noted that the service had acquired the Bixie jishi or one of its derivatives, describing it as a "very clever" pamphlet with a "queer mixture of truth and error". He attributed the text to a member of the Qing literati, writing: "I have no doubt but that the literati have it, and many more like it, on their shelves".

An anti-Christian mass movement did not emerge in China until the end of the 19th century and the Boxer Rebellion. During much of the 19th century, attacks on both missionaries and Chinese Christians were local and generally unorganized. Western contemporaries, unaware of the spread of anti-Christian ideas through oral retelling, attributed them to Bixie jishi and similar texts. The historian Barend ter Haar writes that it is very unlikely that the tract was able to inspire popular attitudes towards Christianity. He points to its highly literary writing style and the fact that riots against missionaries never emerged from the theological issues and sexual impropriety of missionaries, the main focuses of the tract.

== See also ==
- Anti-Christian Movement
- Antireligious campaigns in China
- Bibliography of books critical of Christianity
