= Dawud Burbank =

Dawud 'Abu Talhah' Burbank (1963–2011) was a British Muslim who adhered to the Salafi Creed of Islam. He translated numerous Arabic texts and books into English and also lectured on Islamic subjects. He died in 2011 while in transit to perform the annual hajj when the bus he was riding on became engulfed in flames.

== Biography ==
Dawud 'Abu Talha' Burbank was born on 20 October 1963 in Coalville, Leicestershire, England into a Christian family. He converted to Islam at the age of 19 and studied at the University of Madinah in Saudi Arabia in the mid to late 1980s where he acquired fluency in the Arabic language.

== Islamic Activity ==
Burbank was a Salafi Muslim involved in translating treatises and books of Salafi scholars upon his return to Britain and was involved in the activities of Jamiat Ihyaa Minhaaj al-Sunnah (JIMAS) until the end of 1995 when the organization splintered along pro and anti-Saudi government lines. Burbank, along with Abu Khadeejah Abdul Wahid led the side that remained quietist towards the government of Saudi Arabia, temporarily creating an organization called ‘Organization of Ahl al Sunnah Islamic Societies’ (OASIS) which quickly became Salafi Publications. Burbank "translated many Arabic texts" in this time that reinforced their objective that "correcting religious belief and practice among British Muslims was more important than political reform".

== Work ==
Burbank was considered by his mosque as a "pre-eminent translator of religious texts" and is said to have translated more than 60 books from Arabic into the English language. According to the Salafi Mosque director, Abu Khadeejah Abdul-Wahid, Burbank "was well known and probably the best Arabic to English language translators in the entire West." at the Salafi Mosque in Small Heath within the city of Birmingham.

== Death ==
Burbank and his wife, Khalida Begum Dost, died on 1 November 2011 when the coach bus they were travelling on from Jeddah International Airport to the city of Mecca in Saudi Arabia caught fire. Burbank and his wife were buried in Mecca.
