= J. Edwin Orr =

Northern Ireland-born minister and author (1912–1987)

James Edwin Orr (January 15, 1912 – April 22, 1987) was an Irish-born American Baptist Christian minister, hymnwriter, professor, author and promoter of church revival and renewal.

== Biography ==
James Edwin Orr was born on 15 January 1912 in Belfast in Ireland (present-day Northern Ireland), of American-British parentage. He was one of the five children of William Stewart Orr and Rose Orr (nee Wright). He studied at the College of Technology, Belfast.

In 1930 or 1931, after spending some years as a baker, Orr began evangelising, not only in Britain but also elsewhere in Europe, as well as North America, Australia and South Africa. During these years he also wrote several accounts of his tours of preaching. On 15 January 1937 he married Ivy Muriel Carol Carlson; they would have four children. The Orrs evangelised in Australia (1939), China, Canada and the United States of America. In 1939 Orr enrolled at Northwest University. On 15 January 1940 he was ordained at Newark, New Jersey, into the Baptist Christian ministry. He received his MA from Northwest University in 1941, and his Th.D. from Northern Baptist Seminary in 1943.

During World War II he served as a chaplain in the US Army Air Forces in the Pacific. After the war he continued his studies and took his D.Phil at Oxford University in 1948, with a thesis on the evangelical awakening of 1859 in Britain. In 1949 he and his wife made the United States their permanent base, while continuing to travel the world promoting church revival and renewal. They eventually travelled to 150 countries.

Orr was influential in Campus Crusade for Christ from its founding in 1951, serving as one of the five original board members of the organization. In 1966 or 1967 Orr became a professor at the School of World Missions, in Fuller Theological Seminary, Pasadena, California. He remained a professor there until 1981, and was a professor emeritus thereafter. Of him Billy Graham wrote, "Dr. J. Edwin Orr, in my opinion, is one of the greatest authorities on the history of religious revivals in the Protestant world."

Orr wrote numerous books, many of them histories of evangelical revivals, and a number of hymns. One of the hymns—"Cleanse Me"—was selected for inclusion in Amazing Grace: 366 Inspiring Hymn Stories for Daily Devotions and The One Year Great Songs of Faith. The words of "Cleanse Me" are based on Psalm 139:23-24 and Psalm 51:2; it is set to the Maori folk tune "Po Ata Rau" (translated as "Now Is the Hour"). "Cleanse Me" was written in 1936 when Orr was at an Easter revival meeting in Ngāruawāhia, New Zealand, where he heard and was enchanted by the Maori Song of Farewell. "Cleanse Me" has been recorded numerous times, including performances by Bill and Gloria Gaither, Irene Bridger, Kenon D. Renfrow, Lloyd Williams, the El Paso Wind Symphony, and Nick Reynolds and Tom Parsons. Nowadays "Cleanse Me" is commonly referred to as "Search Me, O God", and the "Po Ata Rau" tune attributed as "Maori" in hymnals.

Orr was a Fellow of the Royal Geographical Society, the American Geographical Society, the Royal Historical Society and the Royal Society of Literature.

He died on 22 April 1987 after preaching at Ridgecrest, North Carolina, United States.

== Works ==
- Can God?: 10,000 Miles of Miracle in Britain, 1934.
- Prove Me Now! (saith the Lord): 10,000 Miles of Miracle – to Moscow, 1935.
- The Promise Is to You: 10,000 Miles of Miracle – to Palestine, 1935.
- Times of Refreshing: 10,000 Miles of Miracle Through Canada, 1936.
- This is the Victory: 10,000 Miles of Miracle in America, 1936.
- All Your Need: 10,000 Miles of Miracle Through Australia and New Zealand, 1936.
- If Ye Abide: 10,000 Miles of Miracle in South Africa, 1936.
- Such Things Happen: 100,000 Miles Around the Globe, 1937 (combined volume).
- The Church Must First Repent, 1937.
- Telling Australia, 1939 (with other authors).
- Through Blood and Fire in China, 1939.
- Always Abounding: An Intimate Sketch of Oswald J. Smith of Toronto (biography).
- Can God?, revised edition of the 1934 publication, published in 1946 and 1951. Combines excerpts from his first three books Can God?, Prove Me Now! and The Promise is to You. Includes a new preface from the publisher describing the author.
- I Saw No Tears, 1948 (New Guinea to Tokyo).
- The Second Evangelical Awakening in Britain, 1949.
- Full Surrender, 1951.
- The Second Evangelical Awakening in America, 1952.
- Good News in Bad Times, 1953.
- The Inside Story of the Hollywood Christian Group, 1955.
- The Second Evangelical Awakening, 1955. Abridgment of his two previous works on the subject.
- Faith That Makes Sense, 1960 (abridgment).
- The Light of the Nations: Progress and Achievement in the Nineteenth Century, 1965. The Paternoster Church History, Volume 8.
- 100 Questions About God, 1966.
- Evangelical Awakenings in India, 1970.
- Campus Aflame: Dynamic of Student Religious Revolution, 1971.
- The Flaming Tongue: The Impact of 20th Century Revivals, 1973.
- The Fervent Prayer: The Worldwide Impact of the Great Awakening of 1858, 1974.
- The Eager Feet: Evangelical Awakenings. 1790 – 1830, 1975.
- Evangelical Awakenings 1900- Worldwide, 1975. Update 2nd edition of The Fervent Prayer.
- Evangelical Awakenings in Africa, 1975.
- Evangelical Awakenings in Southern Asia, 1975.
- Evangelical Awakenings in Eastern Asia, 1975.
- Evangelical Awakenings in the South Seas, 1976.
- The Faith that Persuades, Harper & Rowe, 1977.
- Evangelical Awakenings in Latin America, 1978.
- Candid Questions about Morality, 1979.
- The Re-study of Revival and Revivalism, 1981.
- Revival is Like Judgment Day, published sermon from 1987.

== Posthumous publications ==
- My All, His All (an upgrading of Full Surrender), 1989.
- The Event of the Century: The 1857–1864 Revival in the U.S.A., 1989.
- An Apprenticeship of Faith, 1993.
- Campus Aflame (revised edition), 1994.
