= God and Sex =

2010 book by Michael Coogan

God and Sex: What the Bible Really Says
- Author: Michael Coogan
- Publisher: Hachette Book Group
- Publication date: 2010
- ISBN: 978-0-446-54525-9

God and Sex: What the Bible Really Says is a non-fiction book written by Michael Coogan, a biblical scholar and professor. The book was first published in 2010 by Twelve Books, an imprint of Hachette Book Group. It explores the relationship between religion, specifically Judeo-Christian texts, and sexuality, drawing primarily from the Bible and ancient religious traditions.

== Content ==
Coogan says that in the Hebrew Bible, there is no prohibition of premarital or extramarital sex for men, except for adultery, i.e. having sex with the wife of another man.

Further, he states that premarital sex for women was "discouraged". The Bible has a word for the sons of unmarried women, and their sons were relegated to an inferior social status. He also claims that Paul the Apostle condemned extramarital sex out of apocalyptic fears (he thought that the world was going to end soon) and that Jesus does not say anything about this, except regulating divorce between a man and one of his wives. Coogan uses the singular ("wife"), but does not say that a man could have only one wife, since Jesus was discussing the Law of Moses, which allowed for polygamy.

Interviewed by Time magazine about this book, he also says that words often translated in the Bible as "sodomy" have often nothing to do with anal intercourse between men, and that according to sola scriptura, the Mormons were right about polygamy.

== Reception ==
The book was well received by Jessica Warner, from the University of Toronto, but was criticized by Prof. Phyllis Trible, from Wake Forest University School of Divinity in North Carolina. Trible asserts that patriarchy was not decreed by God but only described by him, it being specific for humans after the fall, and claims that Saint Paul made the same mistake as Coogan in this respect. The Catholic apologist Robert Sungenis strongly denounced both the book and the author on numerous other grounds.

The book was reviewed by ABC Radio National which claimed that "Michael Coogan is one of the leading Biblical scholars in the US, and in his book God and Sex: What the Bible Really Says, he reveals all, including whether David loved Jonathan in that way."

CNN gave Coogan the chance to present his book on its website. Newsweek also had an article about this book. The Young Turks presented an interview with Coogan upon this book.

== Abstract ==
The author, Michael Coogan, makes several claims on various issues in his book God and Sex, including:

that in the Old Testament, child sacrifice was prohibited, but this prohibition wasn't always obeyed; that a man's sexual history was never an issue (thus no such thing as a virginity requirement for men); the only religiously celibate Jews were the Essenes, but this was contrary to mainstream Judaism; Saint Peter was married; Saint Paul thought that Saint Joseph had fathered Jesus; "Joseph 'did not know' Mary 'until she has given birth to a son'" (she did not remain virgin, according to Saint Matthew), prophets were both male and female, the priesthood and the rabbinate were for men only, but Phoebe was a deacon and Junia was an apostle, the Bible states that men are superior to women, polygyny was frequent, abortions were so rare that they were not a problem for the authors of the Bible, but there was a ritual meant for making unfaithful women abort; the books of the Bible were "kind of hypertext", Yahweh visited Abraham, Ishmael has probably sexually abused Isaac; the Bible does not state if Adam and Eve were married; there are Biblical laws regulating polygyny, and "concubine" meant "secondary wife"; Abishag laid with David but he was impotent, widows, rape victims and divorced women were "used goods", thus unworthy of a priest; the Bible is inconsistent on divorce and "pervasively patriarchal"; the Ten Commandments were intended for Jewish men only; marriage meant transfer of property, but women were inferior to real estate; adultery was about property rights; in the Hebrew Bible there was no ban on men having sex with unmarried women (including prostitutes); in David's time Jerusalem had only a few thousand inhabitants; father-daughter incest was only a devaluation of daughter's value; Onan was not masturbating; the Bible is inconsistent about brother-sister incest; sex with a woman was prohibited during her period, but so is wearing wool and linen; David and Jonathan were not sexual partners; Sodom's sin was being inhospitable to strangers and "mistreatment of the powerless"; Saint Jude does not say that Sodom's sin was homosexuality; "sacred prostitution" nowhere and "never took place"; the Hebrew Bible does not say anything about lesbianism, but Saint Paul thought that God made homosexuals so; Jesus said very little about sexuality; the Bible is opposed to homosexuality; having sex with prostitutes was seen as a way of losing money and Saint Paul opposed the use of prostitutes, but "Judah's use of a prostitute was normal and acceptable", this also applies to Samson, who also foreshadowed suicide bombers; Mary Magdalene wasn't a prostitute; God has reproductive organs and had a wife/wives; Jews were initially polytheist, Genesis 1:26-27 says that the elohim were male and female and humans were made in their image; God's sons had sex with women; Yahweh is a sexual being, Wisdom was God's wife, gods used to have children in many mythologies, Israel was God's wife (polygyny wasn't a problem for him); "all theology is metaphor" and Yahweh was "an insanely jealous and abusive husband".

Those are some of the issues up through page 188 of the book.

== Bibliography ==
- Coogan, Michael (October 2010). God and Sex: What the Bible Really Says (1st ed.). New York, Boston: Twelve. Hachette Book Group. ISBN 978-0-446-54525-9. OCLC 505927356.
