= Demystifying Islam =

Book by Harris Zafar

Demystifying Islam: Tackling the Tough Questions
- Author: Harris Zafar
- Language: English
- Published: May 29, 2014
- Publisher: Rowman & Littlefield
- Publication place: United States
- Media type: Print
- Pages: 218 pp
- ISBN: 978-1-4422-2327-1

Demystifying Islam: Tackling the Tough Questions is a 2014 non-fiction book by Harris Zafar.

== Overview ==
Author Harris Zafar, "a national spokesperson for the Ahmadiyya Muslim Community USA," addresses common misunderstandings about the Islamic faith and culture for Westerners.
