= As-Salafi Mosque =

Mosque in Birmingham, England, United Kingdom

- Location of the mosque in England

Religion
- Affiliation: Sunni Islam
- Sect: Salafi
- Ecclesiastical or organisational status: Mosque
- Status: Active

Location
- Location: Small Heath, Birmingham, England
- Country: United Kingdom
- Coordinates: 52°28′13″N 1°51′30″W

Architecture
- Type: Warehouse
- Completed: 2002
- Capacity: 800 worshippers

Website
- wrightstreetmosque.com

The As-Salafi Mosque, also known as the Salafi Mosque and as the Wright Street Mosque, is a Salafi Sunni mosque, located in the Small Heath area of Birmingham, in the West Midlands region of England, in the United Kingdom. The mosque was founded in 2002 and is situated near the intersection of Muntz and Wright Streets and just behind Coventry Road.

== Overview ==
The mosque is contained within the same building and connected to the registered charity and Islamic materials publisher Salafi Publications and the "Salafi Bookstore".

According to the mosque director, Abu Khadeejah Abdul-Wahid, more than a thousand men, women, and children pray the Friday 'jum'ah' Prayers there, and the mosque also contains a primary school and an evening Qur'an memorization school. According to mosque flyers, there are usually Islamic-based lessons every day of the week as well as seasonal conferences which can attract approximately 3,000 attendees from the UK and throughout Europe.

Dawud Burbank (Abu Talhah) was a former senior lecturer at the mosque.

As of 2012, the As-Salafi Mosque was one of one-hundred and sixty-three mosques in Birmingham. It was also one of six mosques in the Small Heath Park area.

== See also ==
- Islam in England
- List of mosques in the United Kingdom
