= Orthodoxy (book) =

1908 book by G. K. Chesterton

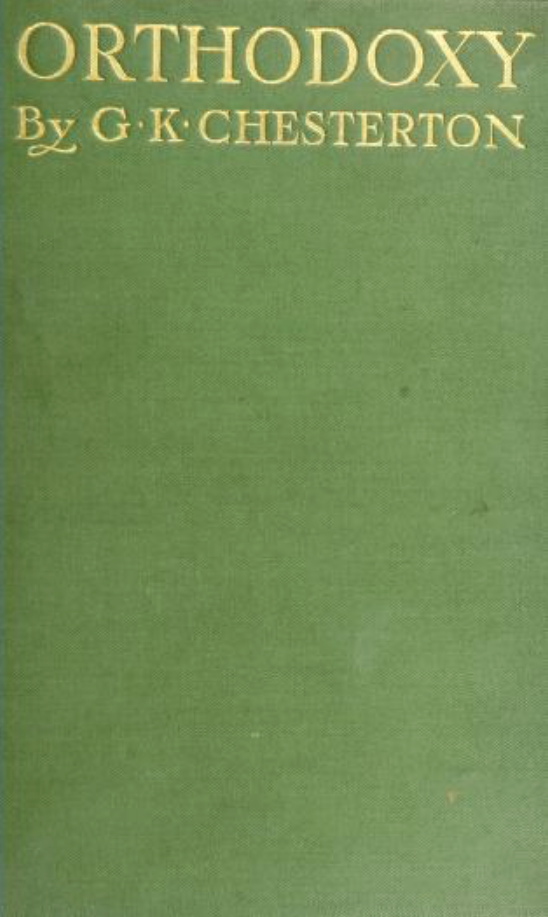
- Cover of the 1909 edition
- Author: G. K. Chesterton
- Language: English
- Genre: Christian apologetics
- Publisher: The Bodley Head
- Publication date: 1908
- Publication place: United Kingdom
- Pages: 299
- OCLC: 1299383669
- Preceded by: Heretics
- Text: Orthodoxy at Wikisource

Orthodoxy is a 1908 book by G. K. Chesterton which he described as a "spiritual autobiography". It has become a classic of Christian apologetics.

Chesterton considered this book a companion to his other work, Heretics, which was a collection of essays aimed at refuting prevalent secular views of his time and defending the Christian orthodoxy. Orthodoxy was written expressly in response to G. S. Street's criticism of Heretics. In it, Chesterton states that "[Street] was not going to bother about his theology until I had really stated mine". In the preface, Chesterton states the purpose is to "attempt an explanation, not of whether the Christian faith can be believed, but of how he personally has come to believe it." In Orthodoxy, Chesterton presents an original view of Christian religion. He sees it as the answer to natural human needs – the "answer to a riddle" in his own words – and not simply as an arbitrary truth received from somewhere outside the boundaries of human experience.

== Summary ==
The book chronicles Chesterton's personal journey to adopting a Christian worldview. Rather than rationalizing alleged paradoxes, Orthodoxy instead embraces them as evidence for the worldview's validity. The first chapter establishes the view that human needs innately conflict, and, along with Chapter 8, "The Romance of Orthodoxy", it explains Chesterton's belief that the Christian worldview is most effective in both explaining and satisfying those disparate needs.

== Contents ==
=== I. Introduction in Defense of Everything Else ===
Chesterton outlines his intention for writing Orthodoxy. He had previously denounced other popular belief systems in his book Heretics, and now wanted to explain what he did believe. He says that when he started considering the nature of human life, he found all the conclusions he reached were already Christian doctrine.

=== II. The Maniac ===
Chesterton explained that the materialistic worldview is coherent, but very narrow. He argues that the Christian is able to believe in both the supernatural and the natural, but the materialist is never allowed "to admit into his spotless machine the slightest speck of spiritualism or miracle." He continues that accepting materialism destroys freedom, because it means the materialist is no longer free to do anything. "[The materialist] must not say to the sinner, 'Go and sin no more,' because the sinner cannot help it."

=== III. The Suicide of Thought ===
Chesterton argues the modern world is not evil, it is rather full of virtues gone wrong. He gives the example of the Christian critic Robert Blatchford who says Christianity should become more charitable by eliminating the notion of sin. Chesterton argues this is an example of the virtue of charity going wrong because it is not coupled with the virtue of truth: "Mr. Blatchford attacks Christianity because he is mad on one Christian virtue: the merely mystical and almost irrational virtue of charity. He has a strange idea that he will make it easier to forgive sins by saying that there are no sins to forgive."

Chesterton explains that mere skepticism must eventually defeat itself, by asking the question why is any thought to be reliable, if all thought is just "movements in the brain of a bewildered ape."

=== IV. The Ethics of Elfland ===
Chesterton argues the modern world frequently confuses necessary laws of reason and mere associations. "For instance, if the Ugly Sisters are older than Cinderella, it is... NECESSARY that Cinderella is younger than the Ugly Sisters." Similarly, "you cannot IMAGINE two and one not making three." These cases are to be distinguished from mere patterns, like apples growing on trees. "You can easily imagine trees not growing fruit; you can imagine them growing golden candlesticks, or tigers hanging on by the tail." Chesterton contains fairytales keep this sharp distinction between necessary laws of reason and the science of physical facts, which are not laws of nature. Chesterton explains that he felt the world is full of contingent things they didn't have to be a certain way, while the modern world thinks the world is as it necessarily had to be.

=== V. The Flag of the World ===
Chesterton describes his attitude toward the universe as patriotism and irrational optimism. He then explains that this is the only attitude that can actually improve the world. He argued that the man who is most likely to ruin the place he loves is the man who loves it with a reason. The man who will improve that place is the man who loves it without a reason. If a man loves a particular feature of a place, he might defend that feature at the expense of the place itself. But if he simply loves a place, he is prepared to do anything to elevate it. He then argues this is the attitude of Christianity.

=== VI. The Paradoxes of Christianity ===
Chesterton argues that the modern world makes paradoxical critiques of Christianity. They simultaneously attack Christianity as too pessimistic and too optimistic, as too womanly and too anti-woman, as too timid and too violent. He says Christianity is attacked from both sides not because its a mere compromise of two extremes, but rather because it fully embraces paradoxical virtues. It equally embraces the valor of the martyr, and the pacifism of the monk.

=== VII. The Eternal Revolution ===
Chesterton argues modern evolutionary thoughts precludes reform. He says all revolution necessitates a fixed vision, and that modern notions of ever-changing ideals immobilize any revolutionary change. He says Christianity maintains this fixed vision modernists lack.

=== VIII. The Romance of Orthodoxy ===
Chesterton claims the modern world feels meaningless because there are no rules. Christianity on the other hand, offers adventure within a set of rules. He makes the comparison of children on an island. If the children have walls that protect them from the ocean, they can wrestle and play with each other without fear. However, if those walls disappear, the children will be paralyzed in the middle of the island, afraid they'll fall in.

He writes that modernists who deny the existence of miracles a priori are illiberal in thought. They are not free to consider all possibilities.

=== IX. Authority and the Adventurer ===
After explaining the rectitude of the foundation of Christian philosophy for the last few chapters, Chesterton now explains why he doesn't merely keep Christian philosophy and leave Christian dogma. He explains he believes in Christianity because of the evidence and rebuts three common reasons for disbelief. Then, he writes that he believes in Christianity, not because it has told the truth, but because it is a "truth-telling thing", and just as it has taught him before, it will continue to teach him tomorrow.

== History ==
Chesterton began writing the book in response to Street's 1905 challenge, titled "Mr. Chesterton", and it was first published in 1908. The book was written when Chesterton was an Anglican. He converted to Catholicism 14 years later. Chesterton chose the title, Orthodoxy, to focus on the plainness of the Apostles' Creed, though he admitted the general sound of the title was "a thinnish sort of thing". Chesterton's choice to focus on the Apostles' Creed made Orthodoxy's apologetic appealing to Christians from various denominational backgrounds.

== Popular reception ==
Orthodoxy was influential in the conversion of Theodore Maynard to Roman Catholicism, as well as in the ordination of Canon Bernard Iddings Bell. In the magazine The Atlantic, critic James Parker recommends the book thus: "If you've got an afternoon, read his masterpiece of Christian apologetics Orthodoxy: ontological basics retailed with a blissful, zooming frivolity, Thomas Aquinas meets Eddie Van Halen."
