= Latter-day Dissent =

2011 book edited by Philip Lindholm

Latter-day Dissent: At the Crossroads of Intellectual Inquiry and Ecclesiastical Authority
- Editor: Philip Lindholm
- Language: English
- Subject: Excommunication from the LDS Church
- Publisher: Greg Kofford Books (Salt Lake City)
- Publication date: 13 May 2011
- Publication place: United States
- Media type: Print (Paperback)
- Pages: 236
- ISBN: 1-589-58128-8
- LC Class: BX8693 .L38 2010

Latter-day Dissent: At the Crossroads of Intellectual Inquiry and Ecclesiastical Authority is a 2011 book edited, with an introduction, by Philip Lindholm. It chronicles the stories of prominent LDS intellectuals who faced disciplinary action by the LDS Church. The book features contributions from members of the September Six, including Lynne Kanavel Whitesides, Paul Toscano, Maxine Hanks, Lavina Fielding Anderson, D. Michael Quinn, as well as Janice Merrill Allred, Margaret Merrill Toscano, Thomas W. Murphy, and Donald Jessee. Lindholm's analysis combined with Diarmaid MacCulloch's foreword and the interviews themselves collectively discuss the nature and extent of intellectual freedom and disciplinary action in the LDS Church.

== Background ==
In September 2010, the LDS Church disciplined six prominent intellectuals and speakers for expressing controversial views in public. Similar action was taken again in 1995, 2000, and early 2003 against other intellectuals, collectively consisting of feminists, activists, a lawyer, authors, and academics who presented a dissenting paradigm to that of the LDS ecclesiastical hierarchy. Latter-day Dissent retroactively examines the events of the September Six and the subsequent disciplinary action, while also following the personal faith journeys of the purged intellectuals.

== Response ==
Historian Jan Shipps says of the book: "The interviews with the eight disciplined Church members are significant additions to the literature of Mormonism. They are quite revealing and, in general, they make for fascinating reading."

The Reverend Professor Diarmaid MacCulloch (Oxford): "The testimonies contained in this book are acts of courage and witnesses to a painful effort to seek integrity, when strong efforts were being made either to make them change their minds or at least keep their intellectual adventures to themselves. They deserve sympathy and admiration."

One reviewer for the Mormon Heretic blog called the book "timely" while another noted, "Some of the interviews are quite sympathetic and engaging. They convey very effectively the personal emotions involved in religious exclusion and exploring what it means to be a 'Mormon.' Personal stories carry power, as members of the Church understand when they bear personal testimonies or do missionary work. In that regard the book can evoke much sympathy and personal reflection."
