= Wafa Sultan =

Syrian-American doctor, writer, and critic of Islam

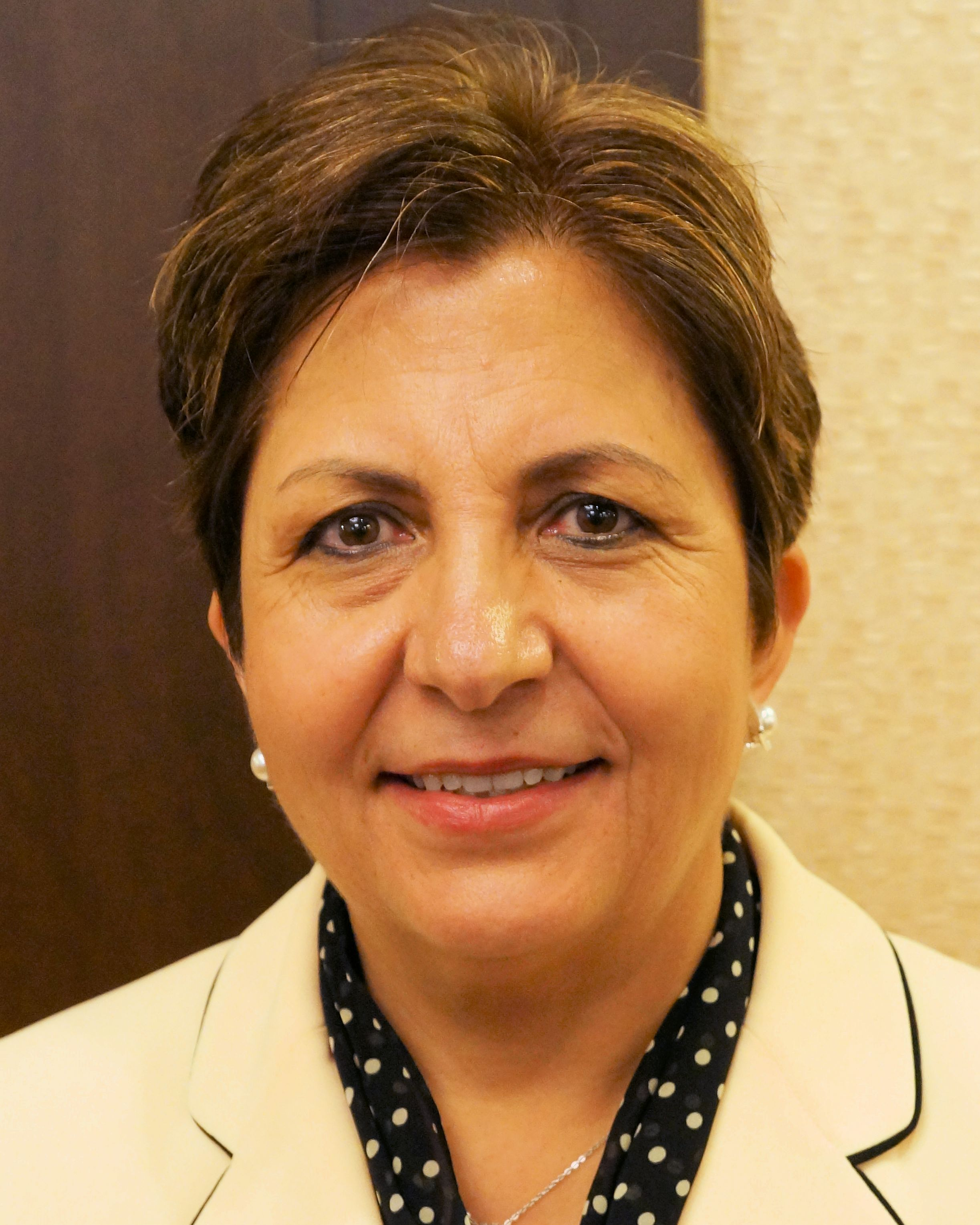
- Sultan in May 2012
- Born: June 14, 1958 (age 68); Baniyas, Syria
- Education: University of Aleppo
- Occupation: Psychiatrist
- Known for: Criticism of Islam
- Notable work: A God Who Hates (2009)

Wafa Sultan (Arabic: وفاء سلطان; born June 14, 1958) is a Syrian-American medical doctor, writer, and critic of Islam. In 2006, Time magazine named her one of the 100 most influential people in the world.

== Early life ==
Sultan was born into a modest middle class Alawite family in Baniyas, Syria.

Although Sultan wanted to be a writer, and would have preferred to study Arabic literature, she studied at the medical faculty at the University of Aleppo due to pressure from her family. She says that she was shocked into secularism by the 1979 atrocities committed by Islamic extremists of the Muslim Brotherhood against innocent Syrians. She states that while she was a medical student, she witnessed the machine-gun assassination of her professor, Yusef al Yusef, an ophthalmologist from the university who was renowned outside Syria. "They shot hundreds of bullets into him, shouting, 'Allahu Akbar!'" she said. "At that point, I lost my trust in their god and began to question all our teachings. It was the turning point of my life, and it has led me to this present point. I had to leave. I had to look for another god." She worked for four years as a psychiatrist in a hospital.

Sultan and her family emigrated to the United States in 1989, where she moved to Los Angeles, California, and became a naturalized citizen. Initially she had to work as a cashier in a gas station and behind the counter in a pizza parlor, but she found her treatment in these jobs better than as a medical professional in Syria. From the time of her arrival she began to contribute articles to Arabic publications in the United States and published three books in Arabic.

== Career ==
Sultan became notable after the September 11 attacks in 2001 for her participation in Middle East political debates, with the publication of Arabic essays that were circulated widely and for television appearances on Al Jazeera and CNN in 2005.

On February 21, 2006, Sultan took part in Al Jazeera's weekly forty-five-minute discussion program The Opposite Direction. She spoke from Los Angeles, arguing with host Faisal al-Qassem and with Ibrahim Al-Khouli, a professor at Al-Azhar University in Cairo (Egypt), about Samuel P. Huntington's Clash of Civilizations theory. A six-minute composite video of her remarks was subtitled and widely circulated by MEMRI on blogs and through e-mail; The New York Times estimated that it has been seen at least one million times. In this video she criticised women's situation in Muslim countries, Muslims for treating non-Muslims differently and for not recognizing the accomplishments of Jews and other members of non-Muslim society while still benefiting from using their wealth and technology. The video became YouTube's most discussed video. The full transcript of the debate, which was made public later, also raised many online discussions.

Following her participation in founding of the Former Muslims United on October 13, 2009, Sultan released her first book in English, A God Who Hates: The Courageous Woman Who Inflamed the Muslim World Speaks Out Against the Evils of Islam. In her book Sultan relates her life story and personal relationship with Islam. She attempts to address the history of Islam from a psychological perspective, and examine the political ideology of the religion's modern form.

In October 2010 Sultan was called as an expert witness to give testimony at the Geert Wilders trial. Wilders is a Dutch politician who was charged with hate speech for his anti-Islamic statements and subsequently acquitted. At the trial Sultan confirmed that she had met Wilders several times in 2009, had seen his film Fitna, and in general agreed with his views about Islam.

== Political views ==
Sultan describes her thesis as witnessing "a battle between modernity and barbarism which Islam will lose". It has brought her telephone threats, but also praise from reformers. Her comments, especially a pointed criticism that "no Jew has blown himself up in a German restaurant", brought her an invitation to Jerusalem by the American Jewish Congress.

Sultan believes that "The trouble with Islam is deeply rooted in its teachings. Islam is not only a religion. Islam [is] also a political ideology that preaches violence and applies its agenda by force." In a discussion with Ahmad bin Muhammad, she said: "It was these teachings that distorted this terrorist and killed his humanity".

In her book A God Who Hates, Sultan writes that "No one can be a true Muslim and a true American simultaneously". Sultan argues that initially, US must help its Muslim citizens give up Islam and embrace Christianity "[W]e first have to help them see their ogre clearly and show them how to exchange their God who hates for one who loves".

In her Time interview, Sultan described herself as a cultural Muslim who does not adhere to Islam, yet remains associated with the faith through her birth, rather than belief; "I even don't believe in Islam, but I am a Muslim."

Sultan is a board member of Stop Islamization of Nations, an organization founded by Pamela Geller, Robert Spencer and Anders Gravers Pedersen.

== Recognition ==
In 2006, Sultan was named in Time Magazine in a list of one hundred influential people in the world "whose power, talent or moral example is transforming the world." Time stated that "Sultan's influence flows from her willingness to express openly critical views on Islamic extremism that are widely shared but rarely aired by other Muslims." In 2006, she also received the "Freethought Heroine Award" from the Freedom from Religion Foundation

== Bibliography ==
- Sultan, Wafa (2009). A God Who Hates: The Courageous Woman Who Inflamed the Muslim World Speaks Out Against the Evils of Islam. St. Martin's Press. ISBN 978-0-312-53836-1.
