= Xinjiang: China's Muslim Borderland =

2004 collection of essays by S. Frederick Starr

- Authors: Frederick Starr; James A. Millward; Peter C. Perdue; Nabijan Tursun; Dru C. Gladney; Yitzhak Shichor; Calla Wiemer; Linda Benson; Sean R. Roberts; Stanley W. Toops; Jay Dautcher; Justin Rudelson; William Jankowiak; Graham E. Fuller; Jonathan N. Lipman; Gardner Bovingdon
- Language: English
- Subject: Xinjiang, Islam
- Genre: non-fiction
- Publisher: Routledge
- Publication date: 2004
- Pages: 528
- OCLC: 52295324

Xinjiang: China's Muslim Borderland is a 2004 academic book about Muslims who live in Xinjiang, a region of China. The collection of essays was edited by S. Frederick Starr. The book was heavily criticized by the Chinese government, and thirteen contributors were banned from entering the country.

== Content ==
In a review for the Journal of East Asian Studies, Benjamin L. Read, an associate professor of Politics at the University of California, Santa Cruz, explained that the book talked about the impact of the 9/11 attacks on the region, the spread of substance abuse and HIV/AIDS, and "the depletion of water resources."

== Response ==
The book was heavily criticized by the Chinese government, who viewed it as an attempt to encourage separatist activity in Xinjiang. A translated version with a scathing introduction, calling the contributors "a hodgepodge of scholars, scholars in preparation, phony scholars, and shameless fabricators of political rumor", was published in China. Meanwhile, thirteen of the contributors were banned from entering China.
