= The Muslim Jesus =

- Title card
- Genre: Documentary
- Directed by: Irshad Ashraf
- Narrated by: Melvyn Bragg
- Country of origin: United Kingdom
- Original language: English

Production
- Executive producer: Gillian Greenwood
- Producer: Irshad Ashraf
- Production locations: London, United Kingdom
- Editor: Tim Pearce
- Camera setup: Colin Butler; Pete Coley
- Running time: 47 minutes
- Production company: ITV Studios

Original release
- Network: ITV
- Release: 19 August 2007

The Muslim Jesus is a 2007 British documentary directed and produced by Irshad Ashraf, and commissioned and narrated by Melvyn Bragg. The documentary is about the Islamic view of Jesus. It was broadcast by ITV on 19 August 2007.

== Overview ==
The one-hour special uses the Quran as its main source, and draws on interviews with scholars and historians. It features commentary from Hamza Yusuf, who was filmed quite extensively for this documentary.

== Background ==
The narrator Melvyn Bragg said, "I was fascinated by the idea ... Jesus was such a prominent figure in Islam but most people don't know that." He added: "I hope it will provoke among Muslims the feeling they are included in television."

Hamza Yusuf said, "In the Christian narrative the most central and fundamental point of Christianity is the death and resurrection of Jesus Christ but Islam basically denies that. The Quran states that it was made to appear that Jesus was crucified as when the Romans captured Jesus God organised a rescue operation."

== Appearances ==
- Hamza Yusuf (Muslim scholar of Zaytuna Institute, California)
- Ajmal Masroor (Imam)
- Usama Hasan (Imam of Al-Tawhid Masjid, London)
- Ahmad Thomson (co-author of Jesus Prophet of Islam)
- Karen Armstrong (religious historian)
- Ahmed Babikir (Imam of Islamia Primary School, London)
- Sarah Joseph OBE (editor of Emel)
- Mohammed Saeed Bahmanpour (writer of Saint Mary)
- Ismael Lea South (rapper)
- Sukina Douglas (member of Poetic Pilgrimage)
- Muneera Williams (member of Poetic Pilgrimage)
- Ibrahim Mogra (Chair, interfaith relations Muslim Council of Britain)
- Abdur Raheem Green (visit administrator of London Central Mosque)

== See also ==
- List of Islamic films
- Jesus in Islam
