= Heretics (book) =

1905 collection of essays by G. K. Chesterton

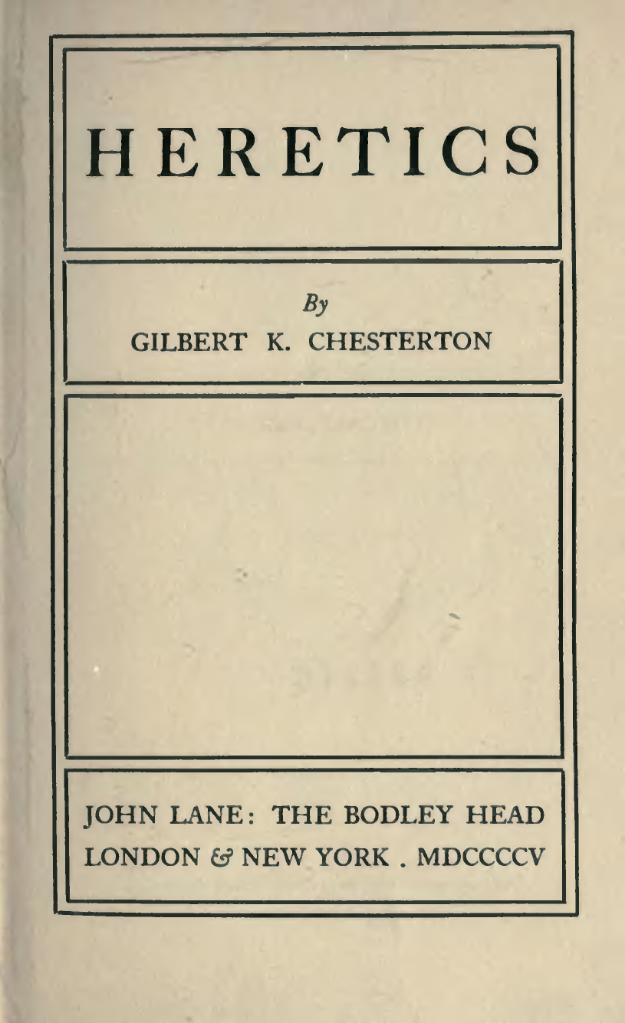
- Cover of the first edition
- Author: G. K. Chesterton
- Language: English
- Genre: Christian apologetics, philosophy
- Publication date: 1905
- Publication place: United Kingdom

Heretics is a collection of 20 essays by English writer G. K. Chesterton published by John Lane in 1905. In it, Chesterton quotes at length and argues extensively against atheist Joseph McCabe and delivers diatribes about his close personal friend and intellectual rival George Bernard Shaw, as well as about Friedrich Nietzsche, H. G. Wells, Rudyard Kipling, and an array of other major intellectuals of his day, many of whom he knew personally. His topics range from cosmology to anthropology to soteriology, and he argues against French nihilism, German humanism, English utilitarianism, the syncretism of "the vague modern", Social Darwinism, eugenics, and the arrogance and misanthropy of the European intelligentsia. Together with Orthodoxy (1908), this book is regarded as central to Chesterton's corpus of moral theology.

== Chapters ==
1. Introductory Remarks on the Importance of Orthodoxy
2. On the Negative Spirit
3. On Mr. Rudyard Kipling and Making the World Small
4. Mr. Bernard Shaw
5. Mr. H. G. Wells and the Giants
6. Christmas and the Esthetes
7. Omar and the Sacred Vine
8. The Mildness of the Yellow Press
9. The Moods of Mr. George Moore
10. On Sandals and Simplicity
11. Science and the Savages
12. Paganism and Mr. Lowes Dickinson
13. Celts and Celtophiles
14. On Certain Modern Writers and the Institution of the Family
15. On Smart Novelists and the Smart Set
16. On Mr. McCabe and a Divine Frivolity
17. On the Wit of Whistler
18. The Fallacy of the Young Nation
19. Slum Novelists and the Slums
20. Concluding Remarks on the Importance of Orthodoxy

== See also ==
- G. K. Chesterton
- Orthodoxy (book)
- Christian apologetics
