= A God Who Hates =

2009 book by Wafa Sultan

A God Who Hates: The Courageous Woman Who Inflamed the Muslim World Speaks Out Against the Evils of Islam
- Author: Wafa Sultan
- Subject: Islam
- Publisher: St. Martin's Press
- Publication date: 2009
- Pages: 244
- ISBN: 978-0-312-53835-4
- OCLC: 317928634

A God Who Hates: The Courageous Woman Who Inflamed the Muslim World Speaks Out Against the Evils of Islam is a book written by Wafa Sultan (Arabic: وفاء سلطان; born June 14, 1958, Baniyas, Syria) a medical doctor who trained as a psychiatrist in Syria, and later emigrated to the United States, where she became an author and critic of Muslim society and Islam.

The book was published in 2009 by St. Martin's Press.

In her book, Sultan relates her life story and personal relationship with Islam. She attempts to address the history of Islam from a psychological perspective, and examine the political ideology of the religion's modern form.

Sultan has received death threats since publishing her book.

== Notable quotations ==
"The trouble with Islam is deeply rooted in its teachings. Islam is not only a religion. Islam is also a political ideology that preaches violence and applies its agenda by force."

"No one can be a true Muslim and a true American simultaneously. Islam is both a religion and a state, and to be a true Muslim you must believe in Islam as both religion and state. A true Muslim does not acknowledge the U.S. Constitution, and his willingness to live under that constitution is, as far as he is concerned, nothing more than an unavoidable step on the way to the constitution's replacement by Islamic Sharia law."
