= Charles Freeman (historian) =

British historian (born 1947)

- Born: England, United Kingdom
- Education: Trinity College, Cambridge; School of Oriental and African Studies; University of East Anglia
- Occupation: Historian
- Parents: John Freeman (father); Winefride Freeman (mother)

Charles P. Freeman (born 1947) is an English author specialising in popular histories of ancient Greece and Rome. He has written numerous books on the ancient world including The Closing of the Western Mind: The Rise of Faith and the Fall of Reason. In 2003, he was elected a Fellow of the Royal Society of Arts.

== Early life and education ==
From an early age Freeman was passionate about history and spent his school holidays helping on archeological digs run by Ipswich Museum. He studied law at Trinity College, Cambridge, and after graduation spent a year teaching in Sudan.

He also holds a master's degree in African history and politics from the School of Oriental and African Studies at the University of London and an additional master's degree in applied research in education from the University of East Anglia.

In 1978, he was appointed head of history at St Clare's, Oxford, an international sixth form college and spent 10 years there. He spent 30 years in total as a teacher and examiner/senior examiner with the International Baccalaureate. From 1988 he has worked full-time as a freelance historian.

== Personal life ==
Charles Freeman lives in Suffolk near Framlingham, England, with his second wife Lydia; between them they have seven children.

== Publications ==
- The World of the Romans: Illustrated Encyclopedia of World History. 1993, Oxford University Press.
- Egypt, Greece and Rome: Civilizations of the Ancient Mediterranean. 1996. Third edition-2014.
- The Legacy of Ancient Egypt. 1997, Facts on File/Checkmark Books
- The Greek Achievement: The Foundation of the Western World. 1999
- The Closing of the Western Mind: The Rise of Faith and the Fall of Reason. Published October 7, 2003
- A.D. 381: Heretics, Pagans, and the Dawn of the Monotheistic State. 2009.
- A New History of Early Christianity. 2009.
- Sites of Antiquity: From Ancient Egypt to the Fall of Rome, 50 Sites that Explain the Classical World. 2009, Blue Guides.
- The Horses of St. Mark's: A Story of Triumph in Byzantium, Paris, and Venice. 2010
- Holy Bones, Holy Dust: How Relics Shaped the History of Medieval Europe. 2011
- The Reopening of the Western Mind. 2020 {Review}
