= Michael Coogan =

American Old Testament scholar

Michael D. Coogan is an American linguist and Biblical scholar. He is director of publications for the Harvard Museum of the Ancient Near East, and Professor Emeritus of Religious Studies at Stonehill College. He has also taught at Harvard University, Fordham University, Boston College, Wellesley College, and the University of Waterloo (Ontario). Coogan has also participated in and directed archaeological excavations in Israel, Jordan, Cyprus, and Egypt, and has lectured widely.

== Education and honors ==
Coogan was raised as Roman Catholic and for 10 years was a Jesuit. He holds a doctorate in Near Eastern Languages and Literatures from Harvard University, 1971. In 2000, he received Stonehill's Distinguished Faculty Award in recognition of his scholarship and teaching.

== Author ==
One of the leading biblical scholars in the United States, he is the author of The Old Testament: A Historical and Literary Introduction to the Hebrew Scriptures; editor of The New Oxford Annotated Bible, The Oxford Encyclopedia of the Books of the Bible, and Oxford Biblical Studies Online; and a contributor to such standard reference works as The Encyclopedia of Religion, HarperCollins Bible Dictionary, and The New Jerome Biblical Commentary. Other projects that he conceived, edited, and collaborated on include The Oxford Companion to the Bible, The Illustrated Guide to World Religions, and The Oxford History of the Biblical World. One work is published by Twelve Books and titled God and Sex: What the Bible Really Says, published in 2010. In the latter, Coogan states, "The text is not, except perhaps in the abstract, intrinsically authoritative: it derives its authority from the community." He favors "thinking of the Bible in a more nuanced way than simply as the literal word of God" and identifies the Bible as "one foundational text in American society" which along with our Constitution must be interpreted critically. His other works include Stories from Ancient Canaan (1978; 2012),The Ten Commandments: A Short History of an Ancient Text (2014), and God's Favorites: Judaism, Christianity, and the Myth of Divine Chosenness (2019).

== Notable appearances ==
- Coogan was featured in The Bible's Buried Secrets and Secrets of Noah's Ark from PBS's NOVA series. The first documentary investigated the origins of the ancient Israelites, the evolution of their belief in one God, and the creation of the Bible.
- Coogan appeared in the History Channel documentary, Secrets of Noah's Ark.

== Sources ==
- Coogan, Michael (2010) God and Sex: What the Bible Really Says. New York: Twelve. Hachette Book Group. ISBN 978-0-446-54525-9.
