= The Closing of the Western Mind =

2003 book by Charles Freeman

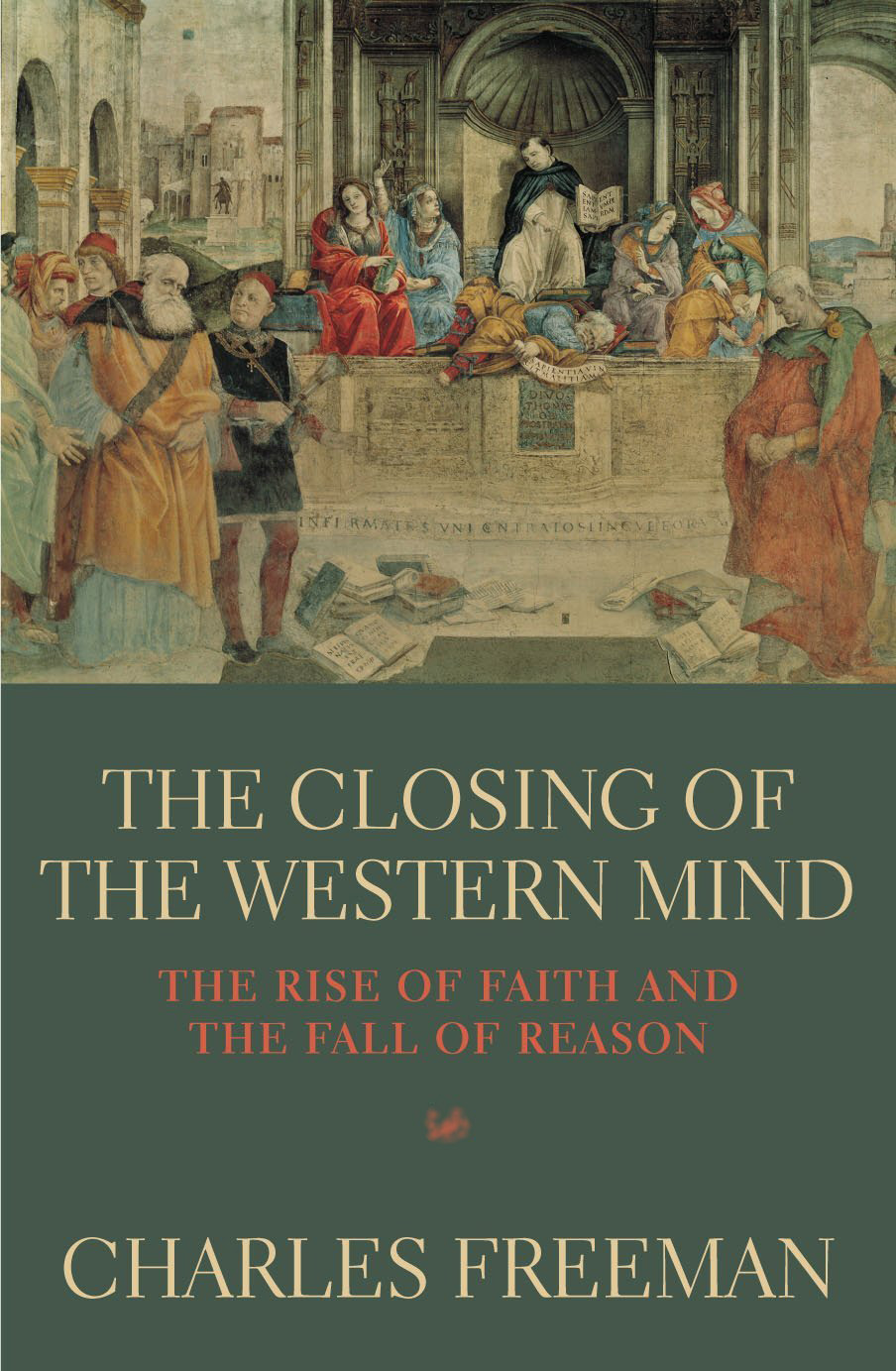
- Author: Charles Freeman
- Language: English
- Subject: History
- Publisher: Knopf
- Publication date: October 7, 2003
- Media type: Hardcover, paperback, audiobook
- Pages: 434
- ISBN: 1-4000-4085-X

The Closing of the Western Mind: The Rise of Faith and the Fall of Reason (2003) is a book by the classical historian Charles Freeman, in which he discusses the relationship between the Greek philosophical tradition and Christianity, primarily in the fourth to sixth century AD. He argues that far from suppressing Greek philosophy, Christianity integrated the more authoritarian aspects of Platonism at the expense of the Aristotelian tradition. He explores the contribution of the Roman emperors to the definition of Christian doctrine, an argument followed up in his 2009 book AD 381. He dates "the reopening of the western mind" to the integration of Aristotle's thought into Christian doctrine by Thomas Aquinas in the thirteenth century.

== Academic analysis ==
=== David C. Lindberg ===
In The Beginnings of Western Science, science historian David C. Lindberg explains the history of science's role in the Middle Ages, where it was preserved by the Christians and monks. He argues that the suggestion that early Christians destroyed science is an outdated myth. He criticizes those, like Freeman, who he believes perpetuate these outdated myths despite conventional scholarship refuting them. Specifically regarding Charles Freeman, Lindberg writes the following: “Finally, to demonstrate that such views are alive and well, I quote Charles Freeman in his Closing of the Western Mind: The Rise of Faith and the Fall of Reason (2003): By the fifth century of the Christian era, he argues, “not only has rational thought been suppressed, but there has been a substitution for it of ‘mystery, magic, and authority’. It is little wonder, given this kind of scholarly backing, that the ignorance and degradation of the Middle Ages has become an article of faith among the general public, achieving the status of invulnerability merely by virtue of endless repetition.”

=== Ronald Numbers ===
In Galileo Goes to Jail and Other Myths about Science and Religion by Ronald Numbers, another historian of science, it states that “The misleading accounts of Hypatia’s death and Freeman’s Closing of the Western Mind, quoted above, are attempts to keep alive an old myth: the portrayal of early Christianity as a haven of anti- intellectualism, a fountainhead of antiscientific sentiment, and one of the primary agents responsible for Europe’s descent into what are popularly referred to as the 'dark ages.' Supporting evidence is available, if not plentiful.”

=== John Morreall ===
John Morreall, a Doctor of Philosophy and Emeritus Professor of Religious Studies, also mentioned Freeman as one who has misperception about “the fate of scientific inquiry at the hands of Christianity in the Middle Ages".

=== Mary Beard ===
Mary Beard, a Professor of Classics at the University of Cambridge, notes: "for most of Freeman's book, this argument takes a back seat". She then notes that most of his book is a general overview "of the rise of Christianity through antiquity and the early middle ages, set against its classical background" and is, as such, not remarkable and actually well written, but she notes also: "To make pagan antiquity a bastion of scientific rationality demands ignoring the Dodds effect and skating very lightly over a whole range of decidedly "irrational" features." - She ends her review: "The real problem is in Freeman's stark opposition between the classical and Christian worlds. The truth is that we are only able to read most of the scientific triumphs of pagan antiquity because the hard-working monks of Christian monasteries chose to copy and study them. Thomas Aquinas may have "re-discovered" his Aristotle through Arab translations. But, by and large, we have Freeman's "irrational" Christians to thank for preserving classical "rationality" – and, for that matter, irrationality."

=== Anthony Gottlieb ===
Anthony Gottlieb, former Executive Editor of The Economist and a historian of ideas, notes that Freeman's work “is highly questionable” but that it “tells an entertaining story, and on the way produces an excellent and readable account of the development of Christian doctrine”, but he ends by stating "Yet the book does not make its case, and indeed barely tries to."

=== David Bentley Hart ===
David Bentley Hart, a philosophical theologian who has taught at the University of Virginia, argued how Freeman “attempts long discourses on theological disputes he simply does not understand, continually falls prey to vulgar misconstruals of the materials he is attempting to interpret, makes large claims about early Christian belief that are simply false, offers vague assertions about philosophers he clearly has not studied, and delivers himself of opinions regarding Christian teaching that are worse than simply inaccurate.”

=== Glen Bowersock ===
Glen Bowersock, a professor of ancient history at Princeton University, wrote about Freeman’s work that it is “essentially a potted history of the ancient world, in which Christianity is introduced as a corrupting influence on Greek and Roman culture. Freeman writes fluently and summarizes his various authorities more or less accurately, but his argumentation is superficial. To assert, as he does in his Introduction, that Christian orthodoxy stifled independent reasoning would imply that Socrates had not been tried for impiety in the golden age of Athens or that books had not been burned in the reign of Augustus.”
