= Dennis McKinsey =

Claud Dennis McKinsey (March 5, 1940 – June 23, 2009 in Ohio) was an American atheist and author of works on the subject of biblical inerrancy from a critical perspective.

== Biography ==
McKinsey obtained a bachelor's degree in philosophy in 1962 and a master's degree in the social sciences in 1964 from the University of Indiana. He taught social studies full-time at the secondary level for ten years. He was a community college instructor in sociology and a secondary guidance counselor for the London City School District. For brief periods he was a civil rights investigator, a truant officer, and a government researcher.

McKinsey was highly skeptical of claims from the Bible which he believed contained many errors, contradictions, and fallacies. He authored The Encyclopedia of Biblical Errancy (1995) and Biblical Errancy: A Reference Guide (2000). He also wrote and published a monthly periodical known as Biblical Errancy from 1982 to 1999.

He was an advocate of the Christ myth theory. McKinsey wrote that "Jesus is a mythical figure in the tradition of pagan mythology and almost nothing in all of ancient literature would lead one to believe otherwise. Anyone wanting to believe Jesus lived and walked as a real live human being must do so despite the evidence, not because of it."

== Politics ==
McKinsey identified as a Marxist-Leninist. He authored the book The Relevance of Marxism (1994).

== Publications ==
- The Relevance of Marxism (1994)
- The Encyclopedia of Biblical Errancy (Prometheus Books, 1995)
- Biblical Errancy: A Reference Guide (Prometheus Books, 2000)
