= List of apologetic works =

This is a list of books in the field of religious apologetics.

== Buddhism ==
- Dharmasiri, Gunapala. 1988. A Buddhist Critique of the Christian Concept of God. Golden Leaves Publishing, Antioch, California.
- De Silva, A. L. 1994. Beyond Belief: A Buddhist Critique of Fundamentalist Christianity. Three Gem Publications, Camperdown, Sydney, Australia.
- Thelle, Notto R. 1987. Buddhism and Christianity in Japan: From Conflict to Dialogue, 1854-1899. University of Hawaii Press, Honolulu.
- Young, Richard Fox., and G.P.V. Somaratna. 1996. Vain Debates. The Buddhist-Christian Controversies of Nineteenth-Century Ceylon. Publications of the De Nobili Research Library, Vienna, Austria.

== Christianity ==
- Conway, Bertrand L. 1929. The Question Box: Replies to Questions Received on Missions to Non-Catholics. New ed. Paulist Press, New York.
- Douglas, Scott, 2016. OrganicJesus: Finding Your Way to an Unprocessed, Gmo-free Christianity. Kregel Publications, Grand Rapids, Michigan. ISBN 978-0825443923
- Geisler, Norman L., and Ronald M. Brooks. 1990. When Skeptics Ask: A Handbook of Christian Evidences. Victor Books, Wheaton, Illinois.
- Geisler, Norman L. and Frank Turek. 2004. 'I Don't Have Enough Faith to be an Atheist'. Crossway Books, Wheaton, Illinois.
- Gore, Charles, Bp. 1889. Roman Catholic Claims. Rivingtons, London.
- Keller, Timothy. 2008 "The Reason for God"
- Kreeft, Peter. 1982. Between Heaven and Hell: A Dialog Somewhere Beyond Death with John F. Kennedy, C.S. Lewis and Aldous Huxley. InterVarsity Press, Downers Grove, Illinois.
- Lewis, C. S. [1940] 1957. The Problem of Pain. Fontana, Glasgow.
- Lewis, C. S. [1947] 1960. Miracles: A Preliminary Study. Fontana, Glasgow.
- Lewis, C. S. [1952] 1955. Mere Christianity. Fontana, Glasgow.
- Little, Paul E. 1968. Know Why You Believe. InterVarsity Press, Downers Grove.
- McDowell, Josh. 1979. Evidence That Demands A Verdict. Revised Edition. Here's Life Publishers, San Bernardino, California.
- McDowell, Josh. 1981. The Resurrection Factor. Here's Life Publishers, San Bernardino, California.
- McDowell, Josh., and Don Stewart. 1980. Answers to Tough Questions Skeptics Ask About the Christian Faith. Here's Life Publishers, San Bernardino, California.
- Montgomery, John Warwick. 2002. History, Law and Christianity. Canadian Institute for Law, Theology & Public Policy, Edmonton, Alberta.
- Montgomery, John Warwick. 2003. Tractatus Logico-Theologicus. Verlag für Kultur und Wissenschaft/Culture and Science Publishers.
- Philip, Johnson, 2003. Christian Apologetics: A Comprehensive Textbook. Wise Men Books, Kochi, India. Online English Version
- Richardson, Alan, Christian apologetics, London, S.C.M. Press, 1947.
- Schaeffer, Francis A. 1982. The Complete Works of Francis Schaeffer. 5 Volumes. Crossway Books, Westchester, Illinois.
- Strobel, Lee. 1998. The Case for Christ: A Journalist's Personal Investigation of the Evidence for Jesus. Zondervan, Grand Rapids, Michigan.
- Turek, Frank. 2014. 'Stealing from God: why atheists need God to make their case' NavPress, Colorado Springs, CO.

=== Mormonism ===
- McDonald, A. Melvin. 1963. The Day of Defense. Rev. ed. Sandy, Utah: Sounds of Zion, 1994, cop. 1963. N.B.: One of numerous editions and printings of this work. ISBN 978-1-886472-53-2

== Hinduism ==
- Shri-hindu-dharma-sthapana (1831)
- Svadesha-dharmabhimani (1834)
- Works written in response to Mata-parīkṣā:
  - Mata-parīkṣā-śikṣā (1839) by Somanātha, apparently a pseudonym for Subaji Bapu
  - Mataparīkṣottara (1840) by Harachandra Tarkapanchanan
  - Śāstra-tattva-vinirṇaya (1844-1845) by Nilakantha Goreh
- Swamikal, Chattambi. 1890 (approx). A Hindu Critique of Christianity. English translation of Krista Mata Chedanam.

== Islam ==
- Bucaille, Maurice, 1993. The Bible, The Qur'an and Science: The Holy Scriptures examined in the Light of Modern Knowledge. Taj Publications, Delhi, India.
- Leirvik, Oddbjørn. 2001. "History as a Literary Weapon: The Gospel of Barnabas in Muslim-Christian Polemics." Studia Theologica 54: 4-26.
- Watt, William Montgomery. 1991. Muslim-Christian Encounters: Perceptions and Misperceptions. Routledge, London & New York.
- Westerlund, David. 2003. "Ahmed Deedat's Theology of Religion: Apologetics Through Polemics." Journal of Religion in Africa 33 (3):263-278.

== Neopaganism ==
- DiZerega, Gus. 2001. Pagans and Christians: The Personal Spiritual Experience. Llewellyn Publications, St. Paul, Minnesota.

== See also ==
- Bibliography of books critical of Christianity
- Bibliography of books critical of Islam
- Bibliography of books critical of Judaism
- Bibliography of books critical of Mormonism
- Bibliography of books critical of Scientology
