= Conspiracy theories in the Arab world =

Conspiracy theories (i.e. explanations for an event or situation that asserts the existence of a conspiracy, generally by powerful sinister groups, often political in motivation, but always when other explanations are more probable) are a prevalent feature of Arab politics, according to a number of sources. A 1994 paper in the journal Political Psychology by Prof. Matthew Gray writes they "are a common and popular phenomenon" that are important to understanding the political landscape of the Arab world. Variants include conspiracies involving Islamic anti-Semitism, anti-Zionism, the machinations of Western colonialism, superpowers, oil, and the war on terror, which is often referred to in Arab media as a "War against Islam". Roger Cohen theorizes that the popularity of conspiracy theories in the Arab world is "the ultimate refuge of the powerless". The prevalence of conspiracy theories reflects effective top-down dissemination of disinformation by state actors, rather than a unique susceptibility of Arab culture to conspiracy, as some have claimed. State hostility and weak protections for journalists present major obstacles to challenging conspiracy theories, as journalists struggle to gather information and put their lives at risk by contradicting their governments. The spread of antisemitic and anti-Zionist conspiracism in the Arab world and the Middle East has seen an extraordinary proliferation since the beginning of the Internet Era.

Gray points out that actual conspiracies such as the 1956 plot to seize control of the Suez Canal encourage speculation and creation of imagined conspiracies. After the 1967 Six-Day War which resulted in a decisive Arab defeat, conspiracy theories started to gain traction in the Arab world. The war was perceived as a conspiracy by Israel and the United States—or its opposite: a Soviet plot to bring Egypt into the Soviet sphere of influence. Thomas Friedman notes the numerous conspiracy theories concerning the Lebanese civil war, attributing the source of the conflict to "Israelis, the Syrians, the Americans, the Soviets, or Henry Kissinger" in an attempt to destabilize the Lebanese government.

== Jewish conspiracies ==
The Anti-Defamation League lists conspiracies about Jews and Zionists including spreading poisons (Jan 1995, Al-Ahram), spreading AIDS (Al-Shaab), blood rituals (June 1995, Al-Ahram), leading an international conspiracy against Islam (March 1995, Al-Ahram), and that the Holocaust is a myth (Dec 1995 – Feb 1996, Egyptian Gazette).

Conspiracy theories hold the Jews responsible for killing American Presidents Abraham Lincoln and John F. Kennedy, and causing the French and Russian Revolution. Zionists are seen as a threat to the world. A widespread conspiracy theory after the September 11 attacks blamed Israel and Mossad for the attacks.

The Protocols of the Elders of Zion, an infamous hoax document purporting to be a Jewish plan for world domination, is commonly read and promoted in the Muslim world.

Pokemon's rapid rise in popularity resulted in popular conspiracy theories as well as significant governmental and religious scrutiny in the Arab world. In 2001, Sheikh Abdulaziz bin Abdullah, the Grand Mufti of Saudi Arabia, issued a fatwa banning Pokemon in Saudi Arabia on the basis that it promotes gambling and that the cards contain symbols resembling "the star of David, which everyone knows is connected to international Zionism and is Israel's national emblem". He also claimed that other symbols shown on the card promoted Freemasonry and Christianity. As a result of this edict, Pokemon products were removed from shops in Saudi Arabia and customs officers began preventing them from entering the country. Various conspiracy theories circulated in the Arab World about Jewish themes in Pokemon, and Japanese embassies throughout the region received inquiries from local officials who were concerned that "Pokemon" meant "I am a Jew" in Japanese. In Jordan, Sheikh Abdel Monem abu Zent, a former member of parliament, claimed that Pokemon "is part of a Jewish plan to corrupt the mind of our young generation because it alludes to blasphemous thinking, it mocks our God and our moral values".

Conspiracy theorists in the Arab world have claimed that ISIL leader Abu Bakr al-Baghdadi was in fact an Israeli Mossad agent and actor called Simon Elliot. The rumors claim that NSA documents leaked by Edward Snowden reveal this connection. Snowden's lawyer has called the story "a hoax".

In early 2020, according to Middle East Media Research Institute (MEMRI) reports, there have been numerous reports in the Arab press that accused the US and Israel of being behind the creation and spread of the deadly COVID-19 pandemic as part of an economic and psychological war against China. One report in the Saudi daily newspaper Al-Watan claimed that it was no coincidence that the coronavirus was absent from the US and Israel, despite the US having had at least 12 confirmed cases. The US and Israel have also been accused of creating and spreading other diseases, including Ebola, Zika, SARS, avian flu and swine flu, through anthrax and mad cow disease.

During the 2026 FIFA World Cup, Argentinian footballer Lionel Messi was the subject of numerous antisemitic conspiracy theories in the Arab World. While Messi is neither Jewish nor Israeli, he visited the Western Wall as part of a trip to Israel in 2013, and Argentina's president Javier Milei is strongly pro-Israel, which led to conspiracy theories that Argentina's success against Egypt and Algeria in the world cup was due to Jewish or Zionist control over FIFA. In addition, in 2016 when Messi donated his cleats to an Egyptian charity, Azmi Megahed, then-spokesman for the Egyptian Football Association, replied “I know he’s Jewish, he donated to Israel and visited the Wailing Wall and whatever. … We don’t need his shoes and Egypt’s poor don’t need help from someone with Jewish or Zionist citizenship.”

=== Animal-related conspiracy theories ===
Animal-related conspiracy theories involving Israel are prominent, alleging use of animals by Israel to attack civilians or to conduct espionage. These conspiracies are often reported as evidence of a Zionist or Israeli plot. Examples include the December 2010 shark attacks in Egypt and the 2011 capture in Saudi Arabia of a griffon vulture carrying an Israeli-labeled satellite tracking device.

Writing in The Times, James Hider linked the responses to the shark incident with those to the vulture incident and ascribed the reactions in Arab countries to "paranoia among Israel's enemies and its nominal friends", adding that "evidence of Mossad using animals is scant".

Gil Yaron wrote in The Toronto Star that "Many animals undoubtedly serve in Israel's army and security services: dogs sniff out bombs and alpaca help mountaineers carry their loads. [...] But tales about the use of sharks, birds, rodents or, as has also been claimed, insects in the service of the military are more the fruit of imagination than hard fact".

== American conspiracies ==
Following Egypt's 2012 presidential election, an Egyptian television station stated that the United States government and Egypt's ruling military council had rigged the election in favor of the Muslim Brotherhood candidate Mohammed Morsi. The theory was seen as fueling a 15 July 2012 attack of tomatoes and shoes by Egyptian Copt protestors on the motorcade of the visiting US Secretary of State. The widespread view that America was conspiring to support Morsi prompted President Barack Obama to note that conspiracy theories abound both alleging US support for and against Morsi. The rise of the Islamic State gave rise to conspiracy theories that it had been created by the US, CIA, Mossad, or Hillary Clinton. The same happened after the rise of Boko Haram.

In Commentary, Daniel Pipes accused prominent Palestinian journalist Said Aburish of attributing the problems of the Arab world "to a vast British and American conspiracy." Reviewing Aburish's A Brutal Friendship: The West and the Arab Elite, Pipes remarked that "outlandish as it may be, the book represents a main line of Arab thinking" and therefore "cannot be so easily dismissed."

Conspiracy theorists in the Arab world have advanced rumors that the US is secretly behind the existence and emboldening of the Islamic State of Iraq and the Levant, as part of an attempt to further destabilize the Middle East. After such rumors became widespread, the US embassy in Lebanon issued an official statement denying the allegations, calling them a complete fabrication.

== The "War against Islam" conspiracy ==
"War against Islam", also called the "War on Islam" or "Attack on Islam", is a conspiracy theory narrative in Islamist discourse to describe an alleged conspiracy to harm, weaken or annihilate the societal system of Islam, using military, economic, social and cultural means. The perpetrators of the conspiracy are alleged to be non-Muslims, particularly the Western world and "false Muslims", allegedly in collusion with political actors in the Western world. While the contemporary conspiracy theory narrative of the "War against Islam" mostly covers general issues of societal transformations in modernization and secularization as well as general issues of international power politics among modern states, the Crusades are often claimed as its supposed starting point.

== Other conspiracies ==
After the fall of Morsi, xenophobic conspiracy theories have singled out Palestinians and Syrian refugees as part of a plot to bring the Muslim Brotherhood back to power. Pro-Morsi supporters single out Saudis and Emiratis as part of a counter conspiracy.

== See also ==
- List of conspiracy theories
- Islamophobic trope

== Bibliography ==
- Gray, Matthew (2010). Conspiracy Theories in the Arab World. Routledge. ISBN 978-0415575188.
- Pipes, Daniel (1998). The Hidden Hand: Middle East Fears of Conspiracy. St. Martin's Griffin. ISBN 978-0312176884.
