= Oleg Zhokhov =

- Born: Oleg Viktorovich Zhokhov; 25 March 1967 (age 58); Nizhny Novgorod, Russia
- Occupation: Businessman

Oleg Viktorovich Zhokhov is a Russian businessman, CEO of "MAG Group Russia" which owns the largest landfill in Russia, "MAG-1", designed for disposal and processing of municipal solid waste (MSW), bulky and construction waste put into operation in 2012. Owner of «AMFG FZE» U.A.E., chairman at MAG Group International (Dubai, UAE), 2012–2016. CEO of SK «Agzho» Russia 2008–2012.

== Biography ==
Oleg Zhokhov was born 25 March 1967 in Gorky (Nizhny Novgorod). His mother, Nina Egorovna Barchukova was a salesperson, father, Viktor Mikhailovich Zhokhov was a driver.

In 1993, he graduated from the St. Petersburg State University of Telecommunications, specialty "Radio communication, broadcasting and television", qualification engineer. Subsequently, in 2001, a training course on the topic "Design and operation landfills for solid waste disposal in countries with the transitional economy", has the corresponding certificate, in 2008, refresher courses on the topic: "Ensuring environmental safety in works in the field of hazardous waste management."

In 1985-1987 he was in the Soviet army.

In 1987-1992 he worked as a radio mechanic in the communication department of the Department of Internal Affairs for Gorky Region.

In 1992-2001 was CEO of ZAO «Gosthimprom».

In 2001, Oleg Zhokhov became CEO of the non-profit organization "City Entrepreneurship Support Fund" (Nizhny Novgorod).

From December 2002 was CEO of MP «Recycling of household waste».

From August 2003 to September 2008 was CEO of company «Recycling of household waste in Nizhny Novgorod».

In 2006 he was elected a full member of the International Academy informatization.

From September 2008 to August 2012 was CEO of SK «Agzho».

In July 2016 Oleg Zhokhov sued his own company MAG Group, with the intention of undertaking legal action against the choice of the general contractor and the tendering the general contractor for the construction of the waste sorting complex at the MAG-1 landfill site on the Moscow Highway in Nizhny Novgorod, Russia. The court granted the application of Oleg Zhokhov by banning MAG Group against the placement of new orders and signing a general contract.

Was in a video in which, shaking the baseball bat, compared the environment with the sport, and also said that he would remove the gargoyles from the garbage processing.

From August 2012 to May 2017 was president of «MAG GROUP» (Dubai, UAE).

Chairman at MAG Group International (Dubai, UAE).

Mag Group International a waste management company with 30 years of experience in the field of waste management, working in a Luxury garbage style in waste collection in Dubai, UAE.

11 November 2013, at the 4th Waste Management Middle East Forum, Dubai – UAE, presented by Dubai Municipality, Oleg Zhokhov, chairman at MAG Group International presented on waste management practices for the present and future. MAG Group International, an umbrella brand for over 70 Russian companies, is a goad sponsor at the summit. The company has started its operations in Dubai - UAE based on its huge experience in the Russian industry. Zhokhov said, "MAG has now entered Dubai and intends to make its mark in the Emirate. Dubai is famous as a luxurious destination, and we are keen on the city as we look forward to setting up a model in the area of waste management that also speaks luxury - a service that would remove from this industry the negative connotation that goes with the very mention of the word waste. With this development, Dubai would become a role model in scientific waste management - one that could be adopted in other parts of the world based on its exemplary performance and success."

From September 2013 founder of «AMFG FZE» (Dubai, UAE).

== Personal life ==
Was married to Elena Shmarina, have a daughter Elizabeth.

Now married to Svetlana Panchina, have son Matvey. Actively engaged in tennis. In 2013, the family moved to Dubai, UAE, and lives there now.

Oleg Zhokhov has interest in psychology, alternative history and shooting. He travels a lot; he is especially interested in exotic countries. He is a member of the Order of TEMPLARI FEDERICIANI. In garbage processing worked under the slogan "Luxury Garbage Style", meaning a high standard of cleaning and recycling of household waste. He shoots videos about ecology.
