= The Hidden Hand =

(The) Hidden Hand may refer to:

- The Hidden Hand (1942 film), a comedy horror film
- The Hidden Hand (band), a stoner/doom band from Maryland
- The Hidden Hand (novel), a serial novel by E. D. E. N. Southworth
- The Hidden Hand (serial), a 1917 American film serial
- The Hidden Hand: Middle East Fears of Conspiracy, a 1996 book by Daniel Pipes
- Hidden Hand: Exposing How the Chinese Communist Party Is Reshaping the World, a 2020 book by Australians Clive Hamilton and Mareike Ohlberg
- A 1926 book by Arthur Cherep-Spiridovich
- "The Hidden Hand", the premiere episode of Dune: Prophecy

== See also ==
- Hand-in-waistcoat
