= Winfield Myers =

American conservative journalist (born 1960)

Winfield Jefferson Myers (born June 23, 1960) is a conservative journalist working at the Middle East Forum, a think tank in Philadelphia, Pennsylvania.

== Early life ==
Winfield Myers was born in LaFayette, Georgia and graduated from Lafayette High School in 1978. He went to Young Harris College where he met his future wife, Dena Gilbert. He received an A.A. degree in 1980, then attended the University of Georgia where he earned a B.A. in 1982 and M.A. in 1984, both in History. He attended graduate school at the University of Michigan and Tulane University.

== Career ==
His academic interests included history, higher education, culture, politics and foreign policy.

=== Teaching ===
While working on graduate degrees, Myers taught on the Great Books and Renaissance history at Michigan; world history at Xavier University of Louisiana; medieval history at Tulane; and early modern history and the philosophy of history at Georgia.

=== Administration ===
Myers works at the Middle East Forum where he is director of both Campus Watch and Academic Affairs in Philadelphia. Formerly, he was at the American Enterprise Institute where he was managing editor of the monthly magazine, The American Enterprise from their Washington, D.C. office.

=== Publications ===
As former CEO of The Democracy Project, Myers is editor of the conservative guide, Choosing the Right College, that included an introduction by former Secretary of Education William Bennett, and past editor of the publication, ISI Study Guides to the Liberal Arts. He was also senior editor of two conservative publications, Campus magazine and the Intercollegiate Review. Additionally, he authored the pamphlet for parents and students, “Asking the Right Questions in Choosing a College”.

=== Writings ===
His writings have been featured in The Wall Street Journal, Miami Herald, National Review Online, The Providence Journal, The Weekly Standard, FrontPage Magazine, The Washington Times, American Outlook, Washington Examiner, American Thinker, and Insight Magazine.

=== Appearances ===
He has appeared as an educational pundit on numerous radio and television shows including BBC, Radio New Zealand, Fox & Friends on Fox News, local Fox networks, PAX TV, Australian SBS TV and CBN-TV.

== Personal life ==
Myers and his wife have lived in Rome, Georgia since 2008.
