= Does the World Hate the United States? =

American textbook edited by Andrea C. Nakaya

- Editor: Andrea C. Nakaya
- Language: English
- Genre: Non-fiction
- Publisher: Greenhaven Press
- Publication date: 2005
- Publication place: United States
- ISBN: 0-7377-2368-8

Does the World Hate the United States? is a 2005 book, edited by Andrea C. Nakaya. It is in the At Issue series of American textbooks, intended according to the publisher for grades 10 to 12+.

The book presents selections of viewpoints on questions about anti-Americanism, its extent and causes in relationship to its foreign policies and popular culture, and whether it is rooted in jealousy. It was published by Greenhaven Press (Farmington Hills) in 2005 as a 139-page hardcover (ISBN 0-7377-2368-8) and paperback (ISBN 0-7377-2369-6).

== Contents ==
Viewpoint	Author	Notes
Introduction
1. Overview: How the World Views the United States	Pew Research Center for the People and the Press	Excerpt from "What the World Thinks in 2002," Pew Global Attitudes Project, December 4, 2002.
2. There Is Widespread Anti-Americanism in Europe	Jean-François Revel	Excerpt from "Europe's Anti-American Obsession," The American Enterprise, December 2003.
3. Anti-Americanism Is Not Widespread in Europe	Eric Alterman	Excerpt from "USA Oui! Bush Non!," The Nation, vol. 276, February 10, 2003, p. 11.
4. Central and Eastern Europe Are Pro-American	Radek Sikorski	Excerpt from "East Is Best: America's Friends in Europe and What They Understand," National Review, April 7, 2003.
5. Arab Nations Hate the United States	Abdel Mahdi Abdallah	Excerpt from "Causes of Anti-Americanism in the Arab World: A Socio-Political Perspective," Middle East Review of International Affairs (MERIA), vol. 7, no. 4, December 2003.
6. Many South Koreans Dislike America	Seung-Hwan Kim	Excerpt from "Anti-Americanism in Korea," Washington Quarterly, vol. 26, Winter 2002/2003, pp. 109–22. Mirrored here: part one and two.
7. Anti-Americanism Is a Minority View	The Economist	Excerpt from "Anti-Americanism On the Rise," The Economist, vol. 366, January 4, 2003.
8. America's War on Terrorism Has Provoked International Resentment	Lutz Kleveman	Excerpt from "How America Makes Terrorists of Its Allies: Kudair Abbass was happy to see the US army keeping the peace in Iraq — until troops killed his brother for violating the curfew. Now, like so many in the region, he wants revenge," New Statesman, vol. 132, October 13, 2003.
9. There Is No Evidence That America's Response to Terrorism Has Provoked International Resentment	Gerard Alexander	Excerpt from "An Unbalanced Critique of Bush: What the International Relations Experts Get Wrong," Weekly Standard, November 3, 2003, p. 25-29.
10. Jealousy of U.S. Power Causes European Anti-Americanism	Joshua Muravchik	Excerpt from "The European Disease: Irrational Anti-Americanism Takes Roots Across the Atlantic," The American Enterprise, vol. 13, December 2002, pp. 24–28.
11. British Anti-Americanism Is Not Caused by jealousy	Mark Thomas	Excerpt from "Mark Thomas Fails To Envy America:Britain's anti-Americanism is blamed on jealousy. This must mean we want the highest obesity rate in the world and a leader who can't string two sentences together," New Statesman, vol. 131, July 22, 2002, p. 11.
12. Hollywood's Representation of the United States Causes Anti-Americanism	Michael Medved	Excerpt from "That's Entertainment? Hollywood's Contribution to Anti-Americanism Abroad," National Interest, Summer 2002, p. 5-15.
13. A Fear of Modernism Results in Anti-Americanism	Fouad Ajami	Excerpt from "The Falseness of Anti-Americanism," Foreign Policy, September/October 2003, p. 52.
Organizations to Contact
Bibliography
Index
