= War on Islam controversy =

Belief in effort to destroy Islam

The "War on Islam" is a concept advocated by some Muslims to denote what they perceive as a concerted effort by non-Muslims and "false Muslims" to harm, weaken, or annihilate Islam and Muslim society around the world. This effort is described as consisting of any level of military, economic, social, or cultural interference in the affairs of Muslim-majority countries, accompanied by negative portrayals of Islam in the media. Though the idea itself was put forward by some Muslim scholars centuries ago, it became particularly widespread in the aftermath of the September 11 attacks and the beginning of the global war on terrorism in 2001. Generally, the themes of the "War on Islam" mostly concern the issues of modernization and secularization in Muslim society, as well as current international power politics. Many Muslims who have asserted the "War on Islam" theory have cited the Crusades as the earliest manifestation of an ongoing organized campaign to destroy Islam.

The phrase or similar phrases have been used by several notable Muslim figures, such as Egyptian political theorist Sayyid Qutb; Iranian revolutionary Ruhollah Khomeini, who led the 1979 Islamic Revolution; Yemeni-American cleric Anwar al-Awlaki; Saudi-born militant leader Osama bin Laden, who founded al-Qaeda in 1988; Chechen warlord Dokka Umarov; British-Pakistani cleric Anjem Choudary; and Palestinian-American ex-soldier Nidal Hasan, who perpetrated the 2009 Fort Hood shooting. The concept has also been repeatedly invoked by a number of jihadist groups, including al-Qaeda and the Islamic State. The English-language political neologism of "War on Islam" was coined in Islamist discourse in the 1990s and gained significant popularity as a conspiracy theory after 2001. While the "War on Islam" theory primarily and most frequently targets the Western world and Israel as the perceived orchestrators, it has also been used to antagonize a variety of other societies and countries, namely India, Russia, and China, as well as the governments of Muslim countries that are seen as subservient to the aforementioned non-Muslim orchestrators' interests.

American author Jonathan Schanzer has argued that the historical Muslim indifference to the Western world turned to "alarmed dislike" with the beginning of Western military and economic superiority in the 17th century. However, since the end of the era of Western colonialism, the rage among Islamists towards non-Muslims and the governments of Muslim-majority countries stems not from alleged non-Muslim aggression and enmity, but from frustration over the unrelenting encroachment of non-Muslim culture, technology, economies, and from a yearning for a "return to the glorious days when Islam reigned supreme."

== Usage of the term and concept ==
The most influential Islamists who have alleged a broad malicious conspiracy against the societal system of Islam are:

=== Sayyid Qutb ===
From the background of the Muslim Brotherhood organization and ideology, Sayyid Qutb, possibly the most influential Islamist author, often described as "the man whose ideas would shape Al Qaeda", also preached that the West was not just in conflict with Islam but plotting against it. In his book Milestones, first published in 1964, he wrote:

The Western ways of thought … [have] an enmity toward all religion, and in particular with greater hostility toward Islam. This enmity toward Islam is especially pronounced and many times is the result of a well-thought-out scheme the object of which is first to shake the foundations of Islamic beliefs and then gradually to demolish the structure of Muslim society.

Olivier Roy has described Qutb's attitude as one of "radical contempt and hatred" for the West, and complains that the propensity of Muslims like Qutb to blame problems on outside conspiracies "is currently paralyzing Muslim political thought. For to say that every failure is the devil's work is the same as asking God, or the devil himself (which is to say these days the Americans), to solve one's problems."

Among the early books following Qutb is Qadat al-gharb yaquluman: dammiru al-Islam, ubidu ahlahu (Western Leaders Are Saying: Destroy Islam, Annihilate All of Its People) written by Jalal `Alam and published in 1977.

=== Ayatollah Khomeini ===
Ayatollah Ruhollah Khomeini, the Shia Islamist leader of the 1979 Iranian Revolution and founder of the Islamic Republic of Iran, preached that Western imperialists or neoimperialists sought to make Muslims suffer, to "plunder" their resources and other wealth, and had to undermine Islam first because Islam stood in the way of this stealing and immiseration. Khomeini claims some of the alleged Western plots being not recent but hundreds of years old.

[Europeans] have known the power of Islam themselves for it once ruled part of Europe, and they know that true Islam is opposed to their activities. (...) From the very outset, therefore, they have sought to remove this obstacle from their path by disparaging Islam (...). They have resorted to malicious propaganda (...). The agents of imperialism are busy in every corner of the Islamic world drawing our youth away from us with their evil propaganda. They are destroying Islam! Agents – both foreigners sent by the imperialists and natives employed by them – have spread out into every village and region of Iran and are leading our children and young people astray.

=== Osama bin Laden ===
From a Salafist perspective, Osama bin Laden emphasizes the alleged war and urges Muslims to take arms against it in almost all of his written or recorded messages. In his 1998 fatwa where he declared the killing of "Americans and their allies—civilians and military—is an individual duty for every Muslim who can do it in any country in which it is possible to do it," bin Laden listed three reasons for the fatwa: the presence of US troops in Saudi Arabia, the increase in infant mortality in Iraq following US-supported sanctions there, and US aid to Israel.

All these crimes and sins committed by the Americans are a clear declaration of war on Allah, his messenger, and Muslims. What bears no doubt in this fierce Judeo-Christian campaign against the Muslim world, the likes of which has never been seen before, is that the Muslims must prepare all possible might to repel the enemy (...). Every day, from east to west, our umma of 1200 million Muslims is being slaughtered (...) We (...) see events not as isolated incidents, but as part of a long chain of conspiracies, a war of annihilation (...). The West (...) will not be able to respect others' beliefs or feelings. (...) They regard jihad for the sake of God or defending one's self or his country as an act of terror.

== Allegations relating to the supposed war against Islam ==
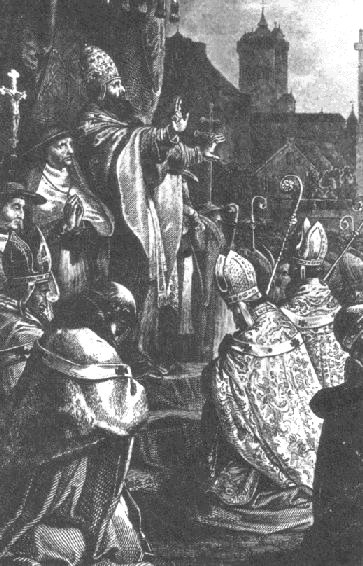
Pope Urban II preaches the First Crusade at the Council of Clermont "I, or rather the Lord, beseech you as Christ's heralds to publish this everywhere and to persuade all people of whatever rank, foot-soldiers and knights, poor and rich, to carry aid promptly to those Christians and to destroy that vile race from the lands of our friends. I say this to those who are present, it meant also for those who are absent. Moreover, Christ commands it."

=== Islamic tradition and history ===
According to scholar David B. Cook, a religious studies professor at Rice University, what some believe is scriptural evidence for the existence of the alleged "War against Islam" is found in a popular hadith, one that supposedly prophesies a war against Islam is the "Tradition of Thawban":

The Messenger of God said: The nations are about to flock against you [the Muslims] from every horizon, just as hungry people flock to a kettle. We said: O Messenger of God, will we be few on that day? He said: No, you will be many in number, but you will be scum, like the scum of a flash-flood, without any weight, since fear will be removed from the hearts of your enemies, and weakness (wahn) will be placed in your hearts. We said: O Messenger of God, what does the word wahn mean? He said: Love of this world, and fear of death.

Cook claims that the idea of a Western war against the societal system of Islam is a belief "at the heart of the radical Muslim and especially the globalist radical Muslim;" a factor "binding globalist radical Muslims together." A factor that "connects the stupidity of extremist Muslims who interfere in world affairs to listen to the words of a person claiming to be a liar under the pretext of Islam, otherwise Islam itself does not have any such offensive statements."

Western supporters of the belief in ingrained Western hatred of – or hostility towards – Islam include historian Roger Savory, and Boston-based novelist and author James Carroll. According to Savory, Christendom felt threatened by Islam and its march into Europe (the Muslim Umayyad Caliphate advanced into Europe as far as northern France before being defeated at the Battle of Tours in 732; the Muslim Ottoman Empire attempted to conquer Vienna twice, laying siege to the city in 1529 and 1683), and thus became hostile to it. Therefore, the domineering actions of the kings of the time were blamed on Islam and forced Christianity to be at enmity with Islam, even though both of them were divine religions and introduced a way to live in peace, and were in harmony and development with each other.

=== Legacy of the Crusades ===
Islamists who use this term often point to the Crusades and European colonization, believing it to be an example of an attempt to destroy the Muslim way of life. Sayyid Qutb, for example, not only believed the West had "a well-thought-out scheme the object of which is first to shake the foundations of Islamic beliefs," but maintained that the medieval Christian Crusades were not "a form of imperialism," but rather Western imperialism was a new form of the Crusades, "latter-day" imperialism in Muslim lands being "but a mask for the crusading spirit." Savory says:

It is not surprising, therefore, to find a great similarity between the medieval view that it was safe to speak ill of Muhammad because his malignity exceeded whatever ill could be spoken of him, and the tone of nineteenth-century missionary tracts which exhorted the Muslims in India to abandon the false religion which they had been taught. There were even echos of the old crusading spirit. When the French occupied Algeria in 1830, they declared that they had in mind 'the greatest benefit to Christendom'. Similarly, Canning's solution to the 'problem' of the Ottoman empire was to bring it into modern Europe under Christian tutelage. When the French invaded Tunis in 1881, they considered their action a sacred duty 'which a superior civilisation owes to the populations which are less advanced'.

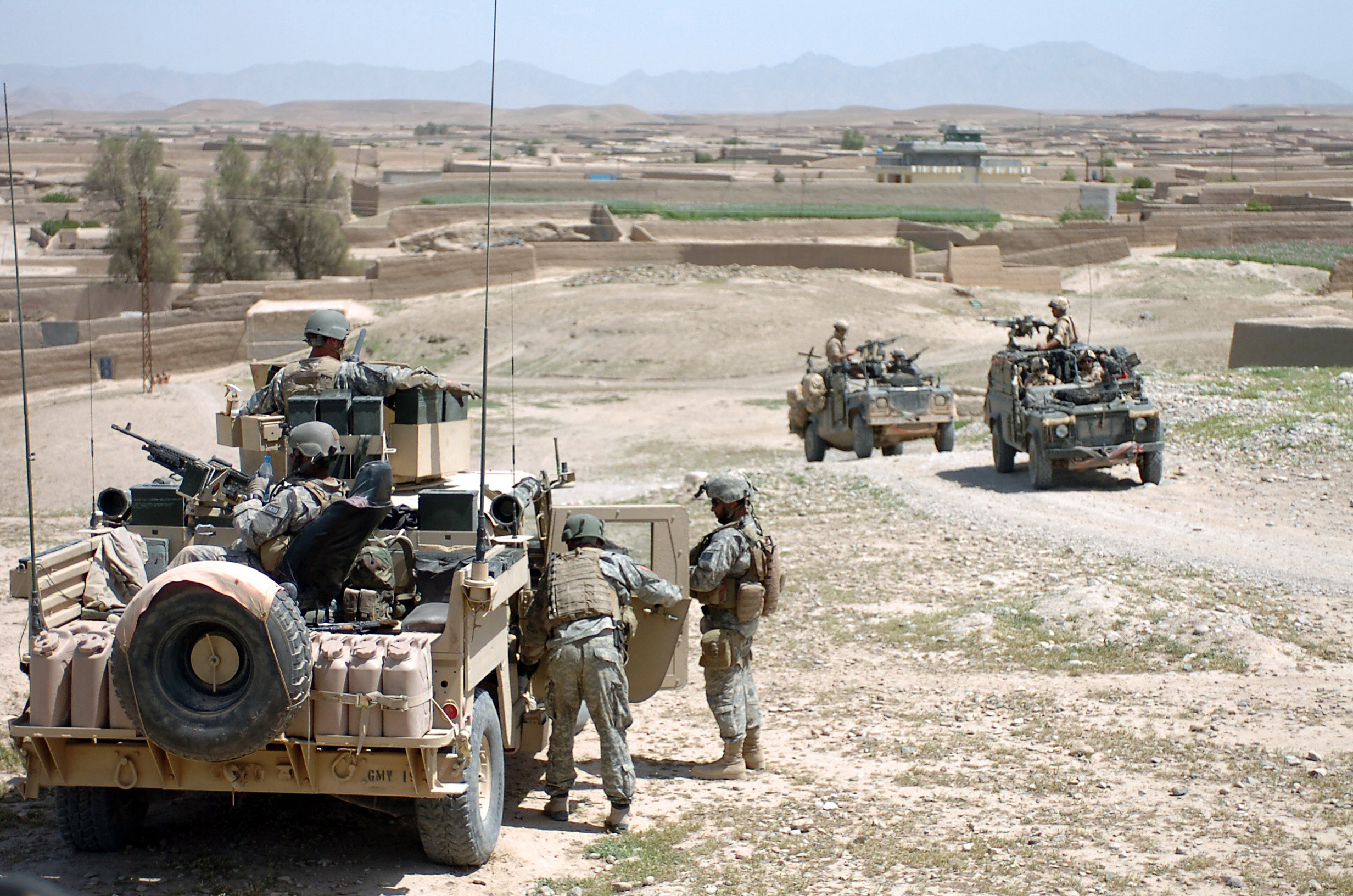
U.S. and UK soldiers in Helmand province. George W. Bush referred to the invasion of Afghanistan as a Crusade

On September 16, 2001, President George W. Bush referred to the war in Afghanistan as a Crusade: "This crusade, this war on terrorism is going to take a while. And the American people must be patient. I'm going to be patient."

In contrast, historian Bernard Lewis points out that the Crusaders had strong motives to wage the Crusade other than the denigration of Islam. The lands they attempted to recover were the lands where Christianity was founded, including "the holy land where Christ had lived, taught and died", and where "a substantial proportion of the population ... perhaps even a majority, was still Christian", since "not much more than four centuries had passed since the Arab Muslim conquerors had wrested these lands from Christendom". Rather than the Crusades leaving a psychological scar passed down through the ages among Muslims, the Arabs of the time did not refer to the Crusaders as Crusaders or Christians but as Franks or Infidels, and "with few exceptions", the Muslim historians of the time showed "little interest in whence or why the Franks had come, and report their arrival and their departure with equal lack of curiosity". (Note: "In recent years it has become the practice, in both western Europe and the Middle East, to see and present the Crusades as an early exercise in Western imperialism - as a wanton and predatory aggression by the European powers of the time against the Muslim or, as some would now say, against the Arab lands. They were not seen in that light at the time, either by Christians or by Muslims. For contemporary Christians, the Crusades were religious wars, the purpose of which was to recover the lost lands of Christendom and in particular the holy land where Christ had lived, taught and died. In this connection, it may be recalled that when the Crusaders arrived in the Levant not much more than four centuries had passed since the Arab Muslim conquerors had wrested theses lands from Christendom - less than half the time from the Crusades to the present day - and that a substantial proportion of the population of these lands, perhaps even a majority, was still Christian." "With few exceptions, the Muslim historians show little interest in whence or why the Franks had come, and report their arrival and their departure with equal lack of curiosity. This was the age of Muslim weakness and division, and the Muslim world, in East and West alike, was being invaded by barbarians, both external and internal, from every side.")

=== Modern-day events ===
The alleged perpetrators of the "War on Islam" include Western powers (especially the United States), pro-Western Muslim regimes (e.g. Jordan, Egypt, Saudi Arabia, Kuwait, Qatar, UAE, Bahrain, Oman, Pakistan) and non-Western, non-Muslim states such as Israel (Israeli–Palestinian conflict), Myanmar (Rohingya genocide), Serbia (Bosnian Genocide), Russia (Chechen–Russian conflict), India (for the conflict in Kashmir), and more recently China (for the Xinjiang conflict). Osama bin Laden mentions: "Meanwhile, a UN resolution passed more than half a century ago gave Muslim Kashmir the liberty of choosing independence from India and Kashmir. George Bush, the leader of the Crusaders' campaign, announced a few days ago that he will order his converted agent Musharraf to shut down the Kashmir mujahidin camps, thus affirming that it is a Zionist-Hindu war against Muslims."

In particular, historical Western support for Israel against the Palestinians and the rest of the Arab world has been declared part of a "war against Islam." Osama bin Laden declared that "the West's rejection of the fairly elected Hamas government is a reaffirmation of the 'injustice, aggression, and rancor' against Palestinians." Enver Masud, an Indian Muslim and author of the book The War on Islam stated that while there are no Muslims in high-level policy making and media jobs in the United States, "Jewish Americans occupy nearly every single position relating to US Arab-Israeli policy." India's role in the Kashmir conflict with Pakistan has been called a "Zionist–Hindu war against Muslims" by Osama bin Laden. Modern-day events alleged to be attacks on Islam include media portrayal of the religion itself and "the war on terror". Alleged conspiracies against Islam sometimes involve other Muslims who are accused of being apostates. The Ayatollah Khomeini believed that "agents of imperialism", the term he gave to "secular" pro-Western Muslims, were "busy in every corner of the Islamic world drawing our youth away from us with their evil propaganda."

In 2016, the US National Security Adviser said: "We are facing another ‘ism,’ just like we faced Nazism, and fascism, and imperialism and communism. This is Islamism, it is a vicious cancer inside the body of 1.7 billion people on this planet and it has to be excised.".

The 2005 Danish cartoon controversy were satirical cartoons depicting Muhammad in a Danish newspaper that led to protests and the burning of the Norwegian and Danish embassies in Syria, and were seen by Osama bin Laden as part of the "Zionist-crusaders war on Islam". In an audio message, Osama bin Laden described the cartoons as taking place in the framework of a "new Crusade" against Islam, in which he said the pope has played a "large and lengthy role" and asserted "you went overboard in your unbelief and freed yourselves of the etiquettes of dispute and fighting and went to the extent of publishing these insulting drawings." "This is the greater and more serious tragedy (than bombing Muslim villagers), and reckoning for it will be more severe." Among others, Iran's Supreme Leader Ayatollah Ali Khamenei blamed a "Zionist conspiracy" for the row over the cartoons. The Palestinian envoy to Washington D.C. alleged the Likud party concocted distribution of Muhammad caricatures worldwide in a bid to create a clash between the West and the Muslim world. After the killing of ISIS leader Abu Bakr al-Baghdadi, a Jordanian commentator writing for the Jordanian newspaper, Al-Dustour, claimed that Al-Baghdadi had been an Israeli agent, who had been trained by the Israeli foreign intelligence service, the Mossad, for a mission to tarnish the image of Islam.

==== Media ====
The Universities of Georgia and Alabama in the United States conducted a study comparing media coverage of "terrorist attacks" committed by Islamist militants with those of non-Muslims in the United States. Researchers found that "terrorist attacks" by Islamist militants receive 357% more media attention than attacks committed by non-Muslims or whites. Terrorist attacks committed by non-Muslims (or where the religion was unknown) received an average of 15 headlines, while those committed by Muslim extremists received 105 headlines. The study was based on an analysis of news reports covering terrorist attacks in the United States between 2005 and 2015.

== Reception ==
Reactions in the non-Muslim West to the alleged war have varied. Some Western political leaders have dismissed the claims of a war being fought against Islam as untrue, while also being sensitive to Muslim fears of such a "war" and shaping some of their political statements and actions with Muslim fears in mind—including denouncing those who verbally attack Muslims. Other non-Muslims have argued that the truth of a religious war is the other way around—it being Muslims who are waging war against non-Muslims.

=== Reception in American politics ===
Following Islamist terrorist attacks both President Barack Obama (following the San Bernardino attack) and George W. Bush (after the 9/11 attacks) made a point of stating that the US was not at war with Islam, instead saying that they were at "war against evil" (Bush) and "people who have perverted Islam" (Obama).

When Republican presidential nominee Donald Trump stated that foreign Muslims should not be allowed to enter into the United States, until the administration could figure out what was going on, Republican Senator Lindsey Graham replied that "Donald Trump has done the one single thing you cannot do — declare war on Islam itself. To all of our Muslim friends throughout the world, like the king of Jordan and the president of Egypt, I am sorry. He does not represent us." Another reaction was that of the Washington Blade, a gay newspaper, which printed a full-page headline stating: "To All Muslims: Trump Does Not Speak For Us." White House Chief Strategist, Steve Bannon, has also been accused of inciting a war against Islam, and has accused Muslims of being a "fifth column here in the United States that needs to be dealt with immediately", and has called Islam "a religion of submission", in contrast with the "enlightened ... Judeo-Christian West".

Madiha Afzal of the Brookings Institution wrote in August 2016 that Trump's allegations of an Islamic war on America were helping ISIS convince Muslims that America is at war with Islam.

=== Western perception of Muslim discourse in the Middle East ===
A measure of the strength of the belief that a non-Muslim power (the United States) is at least attempting to weaken, if not annihilate, Islam can be found in opinion polls that showed, as of late 2006 and early 2007, strong majorities — at least 70% — in the Muslim countries of Egypt, Morocco, Pakistan, and Indonesia, answering "yes" to the pollsters' question: do you believe the United States seeks to "weaken and divide the Islamic world?"

Daniel Benjamin and Steven Simon write in their book Age of Sacred Terror:

In the Middle East and Pakistan, religious discourse dominates societies, the airwaves, and thinking about the world. Radical mosques have proliferated throughout Egypt. Bookstores are dominated by works with religious themes … The demand for sharia, the belief that their governments are unfaithful to Islam and that Islam is the answer to all problems, and the certainty that the West has declared war on Islam; these are the themes that dominate public discussion. Islamists may not control parliaments or government palaces, but they have occupied the popular imagination.

The idea that the West is waging war on Islam has however been dismissed by many non-Muslims in the west. Salman Rushdie, victim of a Fatwa by Ayatollah Khomeini calling for his death, has argued that what Islamists have called a war of "the west versus Islam" is more complicated. Islamists are "opposed not only to the west and 'the Jews' but to their fellow Islamists", an example being the fight between the Sunni Taliban and the Shia Islamic Republic of Iran. "This paranoid Islam, which blames outsiders, 'infidels', for all the ills of Muslim societies and whose proposed remedy is the closing of those societies to the rival project of modernity, is presently the fastest-growing version of Islam in the world," according to Rushdie.

=== Western proponents of the "War against Islam" theory ===
According to James Carroll, the conflict between Muslims and Westerners "has its origins more in 'the West' than in the House of Islam", and can be traced to "the poison flower of the Crusades, with their denigrations of distant cultures", and other Western injustices. Proponents of this view often consider the war on terrorism with the accompanying 2001 military activity in Afghanistan and 2003 invasion of Iraq to be part of the war against Islam. Western colonialism in the Middle East throughout the 20th century is also regarded as such an attack by some.

== See also ==
- Conspiracy theories in the Arab world
- Conspiracy theories in Turkey
- List of conspiracy theories
- Destruction of early Islamic heritage sites in Saudi Arabia
- Grand Mosque seizure
- Islam and modernity
- Islamophobia in the media
- Islam and secularism
- Islamophobia in the United States
- Persecution of Muslims
- Violence against Muslims in India
