= Jonathan Little (composer) =

Australian composer

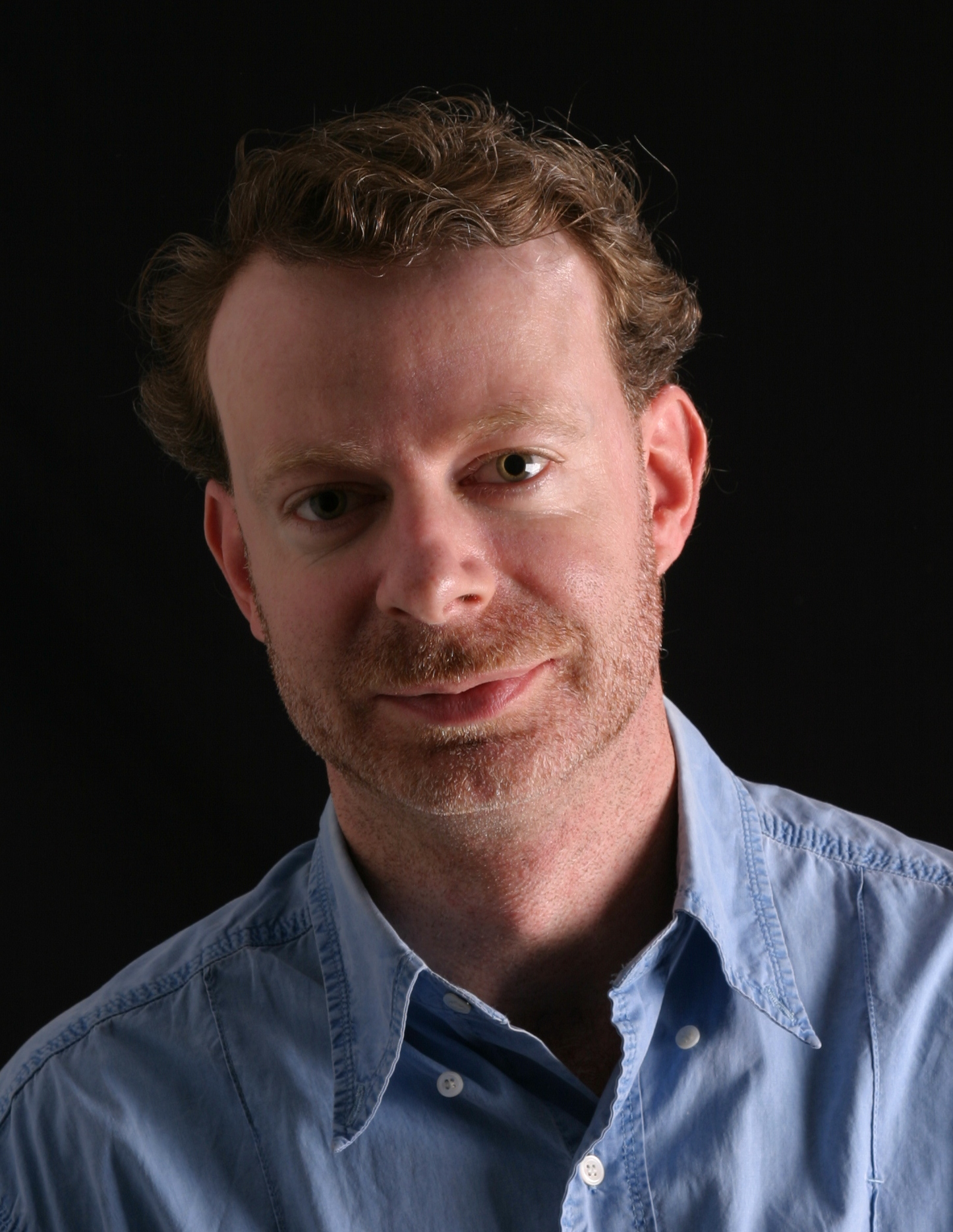
- Born: Melbourne, Australia
- Occupation: Composer

Kyrie, op. 5, for SATB double choir and soloists
Performed by the Thomas Tallis Society Choir

Sacred Prelude, Op. 1 for string quintet
Performed by soloists of the Czech Philharmonic Orchestra

Terpsichore, Op. 7, for large orchestra
Performed by the Kiev Philharmonic Orchestra

Polyhymnia, Op. 10, for multi-divisi string orchestra
Performed by Moravian Philharmonic strings

Jonathan David Little FCLM, FISM, FRSA (born 1965 in Melbourne, Australia) is an Australian contemporary classical composer, arts educator and author on cultural history based in the UK and Australia. In 2008, his first CD was voted one of the top recordings of the year by US Fanfare magazine ("The Want List 2008"). He was subsequently featured in a news article in Musical Opinion in early 2009. As a composer, he first came to prominence in America in 2006 when The American Society of Composers, Authors and Publishers (ASCAP) ran an article on him having five of his works accepted for recording (2004–07) by the US-headquartered French contemporary music label ERM (Editions de la Rue Margot), aimed at showcasing international contemporary composers. He was awarded the Collard Fellowship of the Worshipful Company of Musicians in 2011, and in 2012 was elected a Fellow of the Royal Society of Arts. He was appointed inaugural Professor of Composition and Music History at the University of Chichester in 2017, and Emeritus Professor from 2019.

== Music and background ==
He studied composition, Performance and Musicology with Peter Dennison at the University of Melbourne, where he won the Lady Turner Exhibition for overall excellence, and a St. Mary's College Academic Prize (where he was a resident student from 1984 to 1987). He holds the degree of Doctor of Philosophy in music for his research at Monash University into the development of "exotic" 19th- and 20th-century orchestration, and has written and broadcast extensively on this, and related topics such as songwriting and composition.

In 2008, the first compilation album of his music was released, entitled Terpsichore and Other Works US critic Lynn René Bayley ranked the album second among her Top 5 worldwide releases for the year (in Fanfare's "Want List 2008"). Terpsichore is one of a series of epic orchestral tone pictures on the theme of the legendary "Nine Muses" – and the complete series remains a work-in-progress.

Jonathan Little works in a variety of genres, including large-scale choral, string and symphonic works. Recordings have been supported by the Foundation for New Music (US), the Kenneth Leighton Trust (UK) and ASCAP (US).

In 2009, Little received a grant from the Musicians' Benevolent Fund to work on a second CD of his compositions, entitled Polyhymnia (The Muse of Sacred Poetry). This second disc (released in early 2012) appeared on the Navona label of PARMA Recordings (US), supported by ASCAP and the Musicians Benevolent Fund. Soon after its release, Polyhymnia was nominated in Spain as "Best Album of the Year".

In December 2011, Little was elected The John Clementi Collard Fellow in Music of the Worshipful Company of Musicians (a City of London Livery Company established in 1500). Little joins the relatively few composers to have received this award - alongside such former Collard Fellows as Herbert Howells, Constant Lambert, William Alwyn, Edmund Rubbra, Gordon Jacob and Alan Rawsthorne. Little was also awarded a PRS For Music Foundation / Bliss Trust Composer Bursary in 2012, to support the composition of the next work in his "Nine Muses" series - Erato.

In 2015, Little was granted an Australian Government / Australia Council "Individual International Arts Project Award", to help fund the creation of an album of multi-part, a cappella polychoral music (or contemporary cori spezzati). He was also one of only seven living composers whose work was selected for the Royal Philharmonic Society and BBC Radio 3's "Encore Choral" Programme – for performance and broadcast during 2016–17.

In October 2016, he was selected to participate in a BBC Singers' Choral Music Workshop, led by Judith Weir, Master of the Queen's Music, and in January 2017, became recipient of a Special Distinction in the ASCAP Rudolf Nissim Prize competition (USA).

In 2017, with funding from the Australia Council, a CD of sacred and secular choral works entitled Woefully Arrayed, was released on the US Navona label - featuring "polychoral" techniques: multi-part, multi-divisi, solo, echo and spatial effects.

For his work in polychoral music, he was nominated for the 2018 Australia Prize for Distinctive Work.

== Career and writings ==
Jonathan Little has also pursued an academic and writing career. He was appointed Senior Lecturer at Buckinghamshire New University in 1999 on their Music Industry Management course (the first such degree course in Europe) – where he specialised in the workings of the British and international recording industry, and taught songwriting analysis. In 2001, he became Principal of the Academy of Contemporary Music in Guildford, England – Europe's largest specialist academy for students of contemporary music, and the first music education establishment to win the Queen's Award for Enterprise (Innovation category).

Little is listed in the Music Publishers Association (UK) Register of Expert Musicologists.

In 2005, he was appointed Consultant Editor to A&C Black's flagship volume of musical reference, the Musicians' and Songwriters' Yearbook, and he has contributed articles on the future of music to the Hudson Institute's American Outlook magazine, and the British Academy's Heart & Soul: Revealing the Craft of Songwriting (published by Sanctuary to celebrate the 50th anniversary of the Ivor Novello Awards). His writings on the future of the music industry initially stemmed from a report surveying the first European digital distribution conference in 2000, and subsequently with Scottish music industry analyst JoJo Gould, he co-founded and edited Music Business Journal (ISSN 1473-6233).

Having acted as a Curriculum Consultant to the British and Irish Modern Music Institute, and Visiting Lecturer in Media Music Composition at the University of Surrey, Little became Reader (2012), and then Professor (2017), in Music Composition and Music History at the University of Chichester.

Little has written two academic studies on musical orientalism and exotic orchestration for EMP, New York: The Influence of European Literary and Artistic Representations of the 'Orient' on Western Orchestral Compositions, ca. 1840-1920: From Oriental Inspiration to 'Exotic' Orchestration, together with its companion volume, Literary Sources of Nineteenth-Century Musical Orientalism: The Hypnotic Spell of the Exotic on Music of the Romantic Period. (This 950-page, two-volume study won an Authors' Foundation/Royal Literary Fund Award for 2011.)

Many of Little's compositions are issued by Wirripang. The National Library of Australia holds copies of Little's selected verse, and all his published musical works. Selected recordings of his music are on deposit at the Australian National Film and Sound Archive, with many scores and recordings also held by the Australian Music Centre.

== Published work ==
=== Printed music ===
==== Symphonic and orchestral ====
- Terpsichore: "The Whirler" or Muse of Dance, Op. 7 (from The Nine Muses, No. 7) (Dance Poem for Large Orchestra), c. 15' (Wollongong, Australia: Wirripang, 2006) ISMN M720072234.
- Polyhymnia: "She of Many Hymns" or Muse of Sacred Poetry, Op. 10 (from The Nine Muses, No. 6) (Lamentation for String Orchestra), c. 21' (Wollongong, Australia: Wirripang, 2010) ISMN 9790720101989.

==== Chamber and instrumental ====
- Sacred Prelude, Op. 1 (string quintet), c. 11' (Wollongong, Australia: Wirripang, 2006) ISMN M720060255.
- Themes on a Variation, Op. 3 (brass & percussion), c. 14' (Wollongong, Australia: Wirripang, 2007) ISMN M720060101.
- Fanfare, Op. 3a (brass & percussion), c. 1’30 (Wollongong, Australia: Wirripang, 2006) ISMN M720041711.
- Duo Sonata on Elizabethan Themes, in 4 movements, Op. 4 (2 percussion soloists), ca. 21' (Wollongong, Australia: Wirripang, 2006) ISMN M720072166.
- The Feast of Kings and Martyrs, Op. 8 (dual for 2 percussionists), ca. 5' (Wollongong, Australia: Wirripang, 2007) ISMN M720060705.

==== Choral and vocal ====
- Basque Lullaby, Op. 1a (voice and piano), c. 2' (Wollongong, Australia: Wirripang, 2005) ISMN M720060187.
- That Time of Year, Op. 2 (a cappella SATBarB soloists), c. 5' (Wollongong, Australia: Wirripang, 2006) ISMN M720041728.
- Kyrie, Op. 5 from Missa Temporis Perditi (a cappella SATB double choir and soloists), c. 5' (Wollongong, Australia: Wirripang, 2005) ISMN M720007908.
- Wasted and Worn, Op. 6 (part song for a cappella SSAATTBB soloists or choir), c. 6' (publication pending)
- Recordare Domine (On Ixion's Wheel), Op. 9 (a cappella SSSSAAAATTTTBBBB choir), c. 21' (Wollongong, Australia: Wirripang, 2010) ISMN 9790720101972.
- Gloria, Op. 18 from Missa Temporis Perditi (a cappella SATB double choir and soloists), c. 10'; (Wollongong, Australia: Wirripang, 2019)
- Missa Brevis, Op. 23 (a cappella SATB double choir and soloists), c. 15' (Wollongong, Australia: Wirripang, 2019)

=== Recordings ===
- Terpsichore and Other Works: Tallis Chamber Choir / Philip Simms; String soloists of the Czech Philharmonic Orchestra; Vocal soloists of the Sofia National Opera; Cardiff Percussion Duo; Kiev Philharmonic Orchestra (and principal soloists) / Robert Ian Winstin. Dilute Recordings, UK (Jan. 2008). Cat. No. DIL 07-002.
- Polyhymnia: Strings of the Moravian Philharmonic Orchestra (and principal soloists) / Petr Vronsky; Kiev Philharmonic Orchestra (and principal soloists); String soloists of the Czech Philharmonic Orchestra / Robert Ian Winstin; Tallis Chamber Choir / Philip Simms; Navona (28 February 2012). Cat. No. NV5867.
- Woefully Arrayed: Sacred and Secular Choral and Polychoral Works of Jonathan David Little. Vox Futura / Andrew Shenton; Stanbery Singers / Paul John Stanbery; Thomas Tallis Society Choir / Philip Simms. Navona (14 July 2017). Cat. No. NV6113.

=== Writings ===
- Sources of Nineteenth-Century Musical Orientalism (doctoral dissertation). Monash University, 1995.
- (as co-editor) The Musicians' and Songwriters' Yearbook 2007. London: Adam & Charles Black, 2006. ISBN 9780713675313.
- (as co-editor) The Musicians' and Songwriters' Yearbook 2008. London: Adam & Charles Black, 2007. ISBN 9780713684728.
- The Influence of European Literary and Artistic Representations of the 'Orient' on Western Orchestral Compositions, ca. 1840-1920: From Oriental Inspiration to 'Exotic' Orchestration. Lewiston, N.Y.: Edwin Mellen Press, 2010. ISBN 9780773414266.
- Literary Sources of Nineteenth-Century Musical Orientalism: The Hypnotic Spell of the Exotic on Music of the Romantic Period. Lewiston, N.Y.: Edwin Mellen Press, 2011. ISBN 9780773415539.

== Main awards and honours ==
- 2019 – Fellowship of the London College of Music (for Music Composition)
- 2018 – "Australia Prize for Distinctive Work" nomination (Council for the Humanities, Arts & Social Sciences)
- 2018 – "Best Classical Music Recording" Nomination, Inaugural RoundGlass Music Awards (USA-INDIA)
- 2017 – Special Distinction, ASCAP Rudolf Nissim Prize (USA) (for large-scale orchestral music)
- 2016-18 – Royal Philharmonic Society / BBC Radio 3 "ENCORE Choral" Award (UK)
- 2012 – "Album des Mes en RNA (Febrero 2012)" (Album of the Month in Reviews New Age, Feb. 2012); Nomination for "Mejor Álbum RNA de Año" (Best Album of the Year) (Spain)
- 2011 – The John Clementi Collard Fellowship in Music of The City of London's Worshipful Company of Musicians (UK)
