= Daniel Pipes =

American Middle East commentator (born 1949)

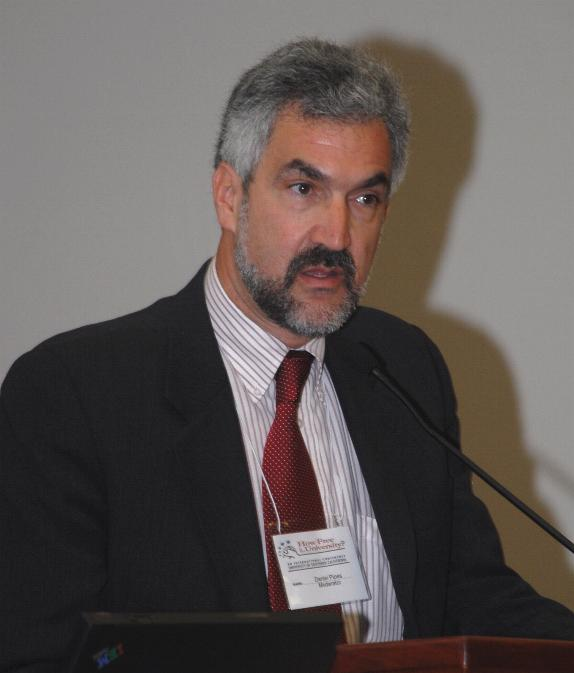
- Pipes in 2008
- Born: September 9, 1949 (age 77); Boston, Massachusetts, U.S.
- Education: Harvard University (BA, PhD)
- Occupations: Professor; writer; activist; commentator
- Relatives: Richard Pipes (father)
- Writing career
- Years active: 1973–present
- Subjects: Middle East; American foreign policy; Islamic terrorism; Islamism; Conspiracy theories
- Website: www.danielpipes.org

Daniel Pipes (born September 9, 1949) is an American former professor, counter-jihad activist, and commentator on foreign policy and the Middle East. He is the president of the Middle East Forum, and publisher of its Middle East Quarterly journal. His writing focuses on American foreign policy and the Middle East as well as criticism of Islamism.

After graduating with a doctorate from Harvard in 1978 and studying abroad, Pipes taught at universities including Harvard, Chicago, Pepperdine, and the U.S. Naval War College on a short-term basis but never held a permanent academic position. He then served as director of the Foreign Policy Research Institute, before founding the Middle East Forum. He served as an adviser to Rudy Giuliani's 2008 presidential campaign.

Pipes is a critic of Islam, and his views have been criticized by Muslim Americans and other academics, many of whom maintain those views are Islamophobic or racist. Pipes has made claims about alleged "no-go zones" overrun by Sharia law in Europe and about U.S. President Barack Obama practicing Islam, and has defended Michelle Malkin's book In Defense of Internment: The Case for 'Racial Profiling' in World War II and the War on Terror.

Pipes has written sixteen books and was the Taube Distinguished Visiting Fellow at Stanford University's Hoover Institution.

== Early life and education ==
The son of Irene (née Roth) and Richard Pipes, Daniel Pipes was born into a Jewish family in Boston, Massachusetts, in 1949. His parents had each fled German-occupied Poland with their families, and they met in the United States. His father, Richard Pipes, was a historian at Harvard University, specializing in Russia, and Daniel Pipes grew up primarily in the Cambridge, Massachusetts area.

Pipes attended the Harvard pre-school, then received a private school education, partly abroad. He enrolled in Harvard University, where his father was a professor, in the fall of 1967. For his first two years he studied mathematics but said he "found the material too abstract". After visiting the Sahara Desert in 1968, the Sinai Desert in 1969, and travels in West Africa, he changed his major to Middle Eastern history. He obtained a BA in history in 1971. His senior thesis was a study of Al-Ghazali and other Muslim philosophers. After graduating in 1971, Pipes spent two years in Cairo, then earned a PhD in 1978, also from Harvard. He wrote a book on colloquial Egyptian Arabic, published in 1983.

== Career ==
=== Work in academia ===
Pipes returned to Harvard in 1973 and, after further studies abroad (in Freiburg-im-Breisgau and Cairo), obtained a Ph.D. in medieval Islamic history in 1978. His doctoral dissertation eventually became his first book, Slave Soldiers and Islam, in 1981. He switched his academic interest from medieval Islamic studies to modern Islam in the late 1970s, with the rise of Ayatollah Khomeini and the Iranian revolution.

He taught world history at the University of Chicago from 1978 to 1982, history at Harvard from 1983 to 1984, and policy and strategy at the Naval War College from 1984 to 1986. In 1982–83, Pipes served on the policy-planning staff at the State Department.

=== Post-academia ===
Pipes largely left academia after 1986, although he taught a course titled "International Relations: Islam and Politics" as a visiting professor at Pepperdine University's School of Public Policy in 2007. Pipes told an interviewer from Harvard Magazine that he has "the simple politics of a truck driver, not the complex ones of an academic. My viewpoint is not congenial with institutions of higher learning."

From 1986 on, Pipes worked for think tanks. From 1986 to 1993, he was director of the Philadelphia-based Foreign Policy Research Institute (FPRI) and editor of its journal, Orbis. In 1990, he organized the Middle East Forum as a unit of FPRI; it became an independent organization with himself as head in January 1994. Pipes edited its journal, the Middle East Quarterly, until 2001. He established Campus Watch as a project of the Middle East Forum in 2002, followed by the Legal Project in 2005, Islamist Watch in 2006, and the Washington Project in 2009.

In 2003, President George W. Bush nominated Pipes for the board of the United States Institute of Peace. A filibuster was launched by Democratic Senators in the United States Senate against Pipes' nomination. Senator Tom Harkin said that he was "offended" by Pipes' comments on Islam, and that while "some people call [Pipes] a scholar... this is not the kind of person you want on the USIP." While defending Pipes' nomination, White House spokesman Ari Fleischer distanced Bush from Pipes's views, saying that Bush "disagrees with Pipes about whether Islam is a peaceful religion". Pipes obtained the position by recess appointment and served on the board until early 2005. His nomination was protested by Muslim groups in the U.S., and Democratic leaders. The Los Angeles Times wrote that "in trying to prevent Middle East scholar Daniel Pipes from joining the board of the U.S. Institute of Peace, Sens. Edward M. Kennedy (D-Mass.), Christopher J. Dodd (D-Conn.) and Tom Harkin (D-Iowa) are abusing their privilege."

== Campus Watch ==
Pipes' think tank the Middle East Forum established a website in 2002 called Campus Watch, which identified what it saw as five problems in the teaching of Middle Eastern studies at American universities: "analytical failures, the mixing of politics with scholarship, intolerance of alternative views, apologetics, and the abuse of power over students." According to The New York Times, Campus Watch is the project for which Pipes is "perhaps best known."

Through Campus Watch, Pipes encouraged students and faculty to submit information on "Middle East-related scholarship, lectures, classes, demonstrations, and other activities relevant to Campus Watch". The project was accused of "McCarthyesque intimidation" of professors who criticized Israel when it published "dossiers" on eight professors it thought "hostile" to America. In protest, more than a hundred academics demanded to be added to what some called a "blacklist". In October 2002 Campus Watch removed the dossiers from its website.

== Views ==
=== Radical and moderate Islam ===
Pipes has long expressed alarm about what he believes to be the dangers of "radical" or "militant Islam" to the Western world. In 1985, he wrote in Middle East Insight that "[t]he scope of the radical fundamentalist's ambition poses novel problems; and the intensity of his onslaught against the United States makes solutions urgent." In the fall 1995 issue of National Interest, he wrote: "Unnoticed by most Westerners, war has been unilaterally declared on Europe and the United States."

He wrote this in the aftermath of the Oklahoma City bombing; investigative journalist Steven Emerson had said in the aftermath of the bombing that it bore a "Middle Eastern trait." Pipes agreed with Emerson and told USA Today that the United States was "under attack" and that Islamic fundamentalists "are targeting us." Shortly after this, the bombing was determined by police to have been carried out by American anti-government terrorists Timothy McVeigh, Terry Nichols, and Michael Fortier.

Pipes wrote in 2007, "It's a mistake to blame Islam, a religion 14 centuries old, for the evil that should be ascribed to militant Islam, a totalitarian ideology less than a century old. Militant Islam is the problem, but moderate Islam is the solution." Pipes described moderate Muslims as "a very small movement" in comparison to "the Islamist onslaught" and said that the U.S. government "should give priority to locating, meeting with, funding, forwarding, empowering, and celebrating" them.

Pipes has praised Mustafa Kemal Atatürk in Turkey and the Sudanese thinker Mahmoud Mohamed Taha. In a September 2008 interview by Peter Robinson, Pipes stated that Muslims can be divided into three categories: "traditional Islam", which he sees as pragmatic and non-violent, "Islamism", which he sees as dangerous and militant, and "moderate Islam", which he sees as underground and not yet codified into a popular movement. He elaborated that he did not have the "theological background" to determine what group follows the Koran the closest and is truest to its intent.

=== Muslims in Europe ===
In 1990, Pipes wrote in National Review that Western European societies were "unprepared for the massive immigration of brown-skinned peoples cooking strange foods and maintaining different standards of hygiene ... Muslim immigrants bring with them a chauvinism that augurs badly for their integration into the mainstream of the European societies." At that time, he believed Muslim immigrants would "probably not change the face of European life" and might "even bring much of value, including new energy, to their host societies". New York University academic Arun Kundnani cited the article as "Islamophobic". Pipes later said "my goal in it was to characterize the thinking of Western Europeans, not give my own views. In retrospect, I should either have put the words 'brown-skinned peoples' and 'strange foods' in quotation marks or made it clearer that I was explaining European attitudes rather than my own."

In 2006, Daniel Pipes said that certain neighborhoods in France were "no-go zones" and "that the French state no longer has full control over its territory." In 2013, Pipes traveled to several of these neighborhoods and admitted he was mistaken. In 2015 he sent an email to Bloomberg saying that there are "no European countries with no-go zones."

In response to the Jyllands-Posten Muhammad cartoons controversy, Pipes wrote that the "key issue at stake" was whether the "West [would] stand up for its customs and mores, including freedom of speech" and the "right to insult and blasphemy". He supported Robert Spencer's call to "stand resolutely with Denmark." He lauded Norway, Germany and France for their stance on the cartoons and freedom of speech, but criticized Poland, Britain, New Zealand and the United States for giving statements he interpreted as "wrongly apologizing."

Through his Middle East Forum, Pipes fund-raised for the far-right Dutch politician Geert Wilders during his trial, according to NRC Handelsblad. Pipes has praised Wilders as "the unrivaled leader of those Europeans who wish to retain their historic [European] identity" and called him "the most important politician in Europe." At the same time, he found Wilders' political program "bizarre" and not to be taken too seriously while criticizing Wilders' understanding of Islam as "superficial" for being against all of Islam and not just its extreme variant.

=== Muslims in the United States ===
In October 2001, Pipes said before a convention of the American Jewish Congress: "I worry very much, from the Jewish point of view, that the presence, and increased stature, and affluence, and enfranchisement of American Muslims, because they are so much led by an Islamist leadership, that this will present true dangers to American Jews."

The New York Times reported that American Muslims were "enraged" by Pipes' arguments that Muslims in government and military positions be given special attention as security risks and his opining that mosques are "breeding grounds for militants." In a 2004 article in The New York Sun, Pipes endorsed a defense of the internment of Japanese Americans during World War II, and linked the Japanese-American wartime situation to that of Muslim Americans today.

Pipes has criticized the Council on American-Islamic Relations (CAIR), which he says is an "apologist" for Hezbollah and Hamas, and has a "roster of employees and board members connected to terrorism". CAIR, in turn, has said that "Pipes' writings are full of distortions and innuendo."

The New York Times cited Pipes as helping to lead the charge against Debbie Almontaser, a woman with a "longstanding reputation as a Muslim moderate" whom Pipes viewed as a representative of a pernicious new movement of "lawful Islamists." Almontaser resigned under pressure as principal of Khalil Gibran International Academy, an Arabic-language high school in New York City named after the Christian Arab-American poet. Pipes initially described the school as a "madrassa", which means school in Arabic but, in the West, carries the implication of Islamist teaching, though he later admitted that his use of the term had been "a bit of a stretch". Pipes explained his opposition: "It is hard to see how violence, how terrorism will lead to the implementation of sharia. It is much easier to see how, working through the system—the school system, the media, the religious organizations, the government, businesses and the like—you can promote radical Islam." Pipes had also stated that "Arabic-language instruction is inevitably laden with Pan-Arabist and Islamist baggage."

=== Views on American foreign policy ===
Pipes was a firm supporter of the Vietnam War, and when his fellow students occupied the Harvard administration building to protest it in the 1960s, he sided with the administration. Pipes had previously considered himself to be a Democrat, but after anti-war George McGovern gained the 1972 Democratic nomination for President, he switched to the Republican Party. Pipes used to accept being described as a "neoconservative", once saying that "others see me that way, and, you know, maybe I am one of them." However, he explicitly rejected the label in April 2009 due to differences with the neoconservative positions on democracy and Iraq, now considering himself a "plain conservative".

=== Donald Trump and the Republican Party ===
In 2016, Pipes resigned from the Republican Party after it endorsed Donald Trump as its 2016 presidential candidate. Yet he announced in a Boston Globe article of October 20, 2020, that he was voting for Trump in that year's presidential election, on the grounds that, "Rather than the person, I advise a focus on a party’s overall outlook... I urge fellow voters to dwell on the strikingly different platforms of the two major parties...and support whichever one better suits their own views; and to do so regardless of the candidates' many failings."

=== Arab–Israeli conflict ===
Pipes supports Israel in the Arab–Israeli conflict and is an opponent of a Palestinian state. He wrote in Commentary in April 1990 that "there can be either an Israel or a Palestine, but not both ... to those who ask why the Palestinians must be deprived of a state, the answer is simple: grant them one and you set in motion a chain of events that will lead either to its extinction or the extinction of Israel." Pipes has proposed a three-state solution to the conflict, in which Gaza would be given to Egypt and the West Bank to Jordan.

In September 2008, he said, "Palestinians do not accept the existence of a Jewish state. Until that change, I don't see any point in having any kind of negotiations whatsoever." He also described the Israeli public as focused on a mistaken policy that he considers to be "appeasement".

Pipes supported Israel in the 2014 Gaza War stating "the civilized and moral forces of Israel came off well in this face-off with barbarism". He has also defended the controversial Canary Mission, stating "collecting information on students has particular value because it signals them that attacking Israel is serious business, not some inconsequential game, and that their actions can damage both Israel and their future careers".

=== Iran ===
Pipes' opposition to Iran is long-standing. In 1980, Pipes wrote that "Iran made the transition to a post-oil economy. It is the only major oil exporter to abandon the heady billions and return to live by its own means." Pipes was critical of the Reagan administration for its role in the Iran–Contra affair, writing that "American actions also helped to legitimize other kinds of help for, and capitulation to, the Ayatollah."

In 2010, Pipes advocated that U.S. President Barack Obama "give orders for the U.S. military to destroy Iran's nuclear-weapon capacity. ... The time to act is now." He argued that "circumstances are propitious" for the U.S. to initiate a bombing of Iran, and that "no one other than the Iranian rulers and their agents denies that the regime is rushing headlong to build a large nuclear arsenal." He further stated that a unilateral U.S. bombing of Iran "would require few 'boots on the ground' and entail relatively few casualties, making an attack more politically palatable."

Pipes advocates that the U.S. support the People's Mujahedin of Iran (MEK) against the Iranian government. Previously listed as a terrorist group by the U.S. and the European Union, Pipes had long advocated a change in that listing. Pipes had described this listing as a "sop to the mullahs". He writes, "the MEK poses no danger to Americans or Europeans, and has not for decades. It does pose a danger to the malign, bellicose theocratic regime in Tehran."

=== Obama's religion conspiracy ===
On January 7, 2008, Pipes wrote an article for FrontPage Magazine claiming that he had "confirmed" that President Obama "practiced Islam". Media Matters for America responded by exposing Pipes' reliance on a "disputed Los Angeles Times article", whose key claims were debunked by Kim Barker in the Chicago Tribune on 25 March. Ben Smith, in an article for Politico, criticized Pipes for what he said were false or misleading statements about Barack Obama's religion, stating that they amounted to a "template for a faux-legitimate assault on Obama's religion" and that Pipes' work "is pretty stunning in the twists of its logic".

== Reception ==
Pipes was included in the Southern Poverty Law Center (SPLC) Field Guide to Anti-Muslim Extremists that was removed from the SPLC website after Maajid Nawaz filed a lawsuit. However, on the SPLC website he is still considered an "anti-Muslim mainstay figure" and "anti-Muslim activist" in many Hatewatch and Intelligence Report articles.

Similarly, Bridge Initiative, hosted at Georgetown University and headed by John L. Esposito, analyses and refers to Pipes as an "anti-Muslim figure", describing his activities as "promoting anti-Muslim tropes" and Pipes as financier of "numerous activists and organizations that spread misinformation about Muslims and Islam". Pipes has also been described as a part of the counter-jihad movement, though more moderate than others.

Tashbih Sayyed, a former editor of the Muslim World Today and the Pakistan Times (not the Pakistani newspaper of the same name), stated about Pipes: "He must be listened to. If there is no Daniel Pipes, there is no source for America to learn to recognize the evil which threatens it... Muslims in America that are like Samson; they have come into the temple to pull down the pillars, even if it means destroying themselves." Similarly, Ahmed Subhy Mansour, a former visiting fellow at Harvard Law School, writes, "We Muslims need a thinker like Dr. Pipes, who can criticize the terrorist culture within Islam."

In The Nation, Brooklyn writer Kristine McNeil described Pipes in 2003 as an "anti-Arab propagandist" who has built a career out of "distortions... twist[ing] words, quot[ing] people out of context and stretch[ing] the truth to suit his purpose".

Zachary Lockman, Professor of Middle Eastern and Islamic Studies and History, wrote in 2005 that Pipes "acquired a reputation in Muslim American circles as an 'Islamophobe' and 'Muslim basher' whose writings and public utterances aroused fear and suspicion toward Muslims". He stated that Pipes's remarks "could plausibly be understood as inciting suspicion and mistrust of Muslims, including Muslim Americans, and as derogatory of Islam".

Christopher Hitchens, a fellow supporter of the Iraq War and critic of political Islam, also criticized Pipes, arguing that Pipes pursued an intolerant agenda, was someone who "confuses scholarship with propaganda", and "pursues petty vendettas with scant regard for objectivity".

When Pipes was invited to speak at the University of Toronto in March 2005, a letter from professors and graduate students asserted that Pipes had a "long record of xenophobic, racist and sexist speech that goes back to 1990", but university officials said they would not interfere with Pipes's visit.

Professor John L. Esposito of Georgetown University has called Pipes "a bright, well-trained expert with considerable experience", but accuses Pipes of "selectivity and distortion" when asserting that "10 to 15 percent of the world's Muslims are militants". In summation, Esposito asserts that when Pipes equating "mainstream and extremist[s] [sic] Islam under the rubric of militant Islam" while identifying "moderate Islam as secular or cultural" can mislead "uninformed or uncritical readers".

== Awards and honors ==
- Pipes has received two honorary doctorates, from the American University of Switzerland (1988) and Yeshiva University (2003).
- In May 2006, Pipes received the Guardian of Zion Award by Ingeborg Rennert Center for Jerusalem Studies at Bar-Ilan University in Israel.

== Select bibliography ==
- Nothing Abides (2015) Daniel Pipes, New Brunswick and London: Transaction Publishers
- Miniatures: Views of Islamic and Middle Eastern Politics (2003), Transaction Publishers, ISBN 0-7658-0215-5
- Militant Islam Reaches America (2002), W.W. Norton & Company; paperback (2003) ISBN 0-393-32531-8
- with Abdelnour, Z. (2000), Ending Syria's Occupation of Lebanon: The U.S. Role Middle East Forum, ISBN 0-9701484-0-2
- The Long Shadow: Culture and Politics in the Middle East (1999), Transaction Publishers, ISBN 0-88738-220-7
- The Hidden Hand: Middle East Fears of Conspiracy (1997), Palgrave Macmillan; paperback (1998) ISBN 0-312-17688-0
- Conspiracy: How the Paranoid Style Flourishes and Where It Comes From (1997), Touchstone; paperback (1999) ISBN 0-684-87111-4
- Syria Beyond the Peace Process (Policy Papers, No. 41) (1995), Washington Institute for Near East Policy, ISBN 0-944029-64-7
- Sandstorm (1993), Rowman & Littlefield, paperback (1993) ISBN 0-8191-8894-8
- Damascus Courts the West: Syrian Politics, 1989–1991 (Policy Papers, No. 26) (1991), Washington Institute for Near East Policy, ISBN 0-944029-13-2
- with Garfinkle, A. (1991), Friendly Tyrants: An American Dilemma Palgrave Macmillan, ISBN 0-312-04535-2
- The Rushdie Affair: The Novel, the Ayatollah, and the West (1990), Transaction Publishers, paperback (2003) ISBN 0-7658-0996-6
- Greater Syria: The History of an Ambition (1990), Oxford University Press, ISBN 0-19-506021-0
- In the Path of God: Islam and Political Power (1983), Transaction Publishers, ISBN 0-7658-0981-8
- An Arabist's Guide to Egyptian Colloquial (1983), Foreign Service Institute
- Slave Soldiers and Islam: The Genesis of a Military System (1981), Yale University Press, ISBN 0-300-02447-9

== See also ==
- Robert Spencer
- From Time Immemorial
- Martin Kramer
- Fouad Ajami
