= Campus Watch =

Web-based project of the Middle East Forum

- Founded: 2002 by Daniel Pipes
- Location: Philadelphia, Pennsylvania, USA
- Key people: Winfield Myers, Director
- Website: Campus-Watch.org

Campus Watch is a web-based project of the Middle East Forum, a think tank with its headquarters in Philadelphia, Pennsylvania. According to its website, Campus Watch "reviews and critiques Middle East studies in North America with an aim to improving them." Critics of Campus Watch say that it is a pro-Israel lobbyist organization involved in harassing, blacklisting, or intimidating scholars critical of Israel.

Campus Watch was launched in 2002 by Middle East Forum director Daniel Pipes. It is headed by Winfield Myers.

== Dossiers ==
Campus Watch encourages students to submit reports about college professors. In 2002, Campus Watch created a controversy when it compiled these reports into 'dossiers' critical of various professors at institutes of higher learning in the United States, in which it detailed their supposedly "anti-Israeli statements". In response to the posting of the dossiers on its website, many individuals sent harassing emails and phone calls to the profiled professors, and the website was widely condemned in the media for supposedly engaging in "McCarthyesque" intimidation. The Campus Watch project was derided as a "War on Academic Freedom"; in protest, more than 100 academics asked to be listed along with those accused by Campus Watch. The response of Judith Butler, a comparative literature professor at Berkeley, was circulated on the Internet:

I have recently learned that your organization is compiling dossiers on professors at U.S. academic institutions who oppose the Israeli occupation and its brutality, actively support Palestinian rights of self-determination as well as a more informed and intelligent view of Islam than is currently represented in the U.S. media. I would be enormously honored to be counted among those who actively hold these positions and would like to be included in the list of those who are struggling for justice.

Rashid Khalidi, a professor at Columbia University who was the subject of a critical dossier on the website, suggested that the Campus Watch campaign was an attempt to silence legitimate criticism, "by tarring it with the brush of anti-Semitism and anti-Americanism, truly loathsome charges." Khalidi taped an anonymous phone call he received, subsequent to the Campus Watch dossier publication, that says: "Khalidi, Columbia alumni love Campus Watch because they keep an eye on thugs like you. We have our eye on you. You'd better watch out."

After two weeks, Campus Watch removed the dossiers from its website. It continues to collect information from students, though it no longer publishes such dossiers. According to Juan Cole, one of the professors who was subject to Campus Watch's dossiers, the website continued to spread false information about him even after the dossiers were removed: "The removal of the individual dossiers is merely a cosmetic change, since the same academics are still being spied on, only under the rubric of spying on their campuses instead."

== Criticism ==
An article in The Nation suggests that Daniel Pipes is "an anti-Arab propagandist", and his Campus Watch project aims to "smear" academics critical of the Israeli occupation or of American foreign policy. Campus Watch's project was identified, in The Nation and elsewhere, as resembling a decades-old AIPAC project:

In 1979 the American Israel Public Affairs Committee (AIPAC) formed its Political Leadership Development Program, which "educates and trains young leaders in pro-Israel political advocacy," enlisting hundreds of college students to collect information on pro-Palestinian professors and student organizations. By 1983 the program had attracted more than 5,000 students on 350 campuses in all fifty states. The next year the findings were published as The AIPAC College Guide: Exposing the Anti-Israel Campaign on Campus, which surveyed 100 campuses and instructed students on how best to counter a "steady diet of anti-Israel vituperation." Around the same time, the Anti-Defamation League covertly distributed a twenty-one-page booklet containing "background information on pro-Arab sympathizers active on college campuses" who "use their anti-Zionism as merely a guise for their deeply felt anti-Semitism."

Joel Beinin, who has often been criticized by Campus Watch, has accused Daniel Pipes of being "beholden to Israeli right wing politics." According to Beinin, "After failing in his own pursuit of an academic career, Pipes has evidently decided to take revenge on the scholarly community that rejected him", in the form of the Campus Watch website. Pipes strongly denied Beinin's charges, writing that he was "offered a tenure-track position and turned it down, preferring to write than teach". while simultaneously attacking Beinin "of credentialitis, the disease that places more emphasis on qualifications than achievements" and the fact that "Harvard's doctoral program in history turned him down but awarded me a Ph.D.." Beinin has also alleged that Campus Watch "makes comments" about the ethnic and cultural background of scholars.

In their book The Israel Lobby and U.S. Foreign Policy, John Mearsheimer and Stephen Walt wrote that

The Lobby also monitors what professors write and teach. In September 2002, for example, Martin Kramer and Daniel Pipes, two passionately pro-Israel neoconservatives, established a website (Campus Watch) that posted dossiers on suspect academics and encouraged students to report remarks or behavior that might be considered hostile to Israel. This transparent attempt to blacklist and intimidate scholars prompted a harsh reaction, and Pipes and Kramer later removed the dossiers, but the website still invites students to report "anti-Israel" activity.

Pipes responded to part of the Mearsheimer and Walt allegations, writing

This account is inaccurate in several ways (e.g. Martin Kramer had no role in founding Campus Watch), but I write specifically to state that no 'Lobby' told me to start Campus Watch. Neither the Middle East Forum nor myself has ever taken orders from some mythical 'Lobby', and specifically I decided to establish Campus Watch on my own, without direction from any outside source. I challenge Mearsheimer and Walt to provide their information that connects this 'Lobby' to my decision to establish Campus Watch.

Later he wrote that "Mearsheimer and Walt unconditionally concede they have no information about the alleged “lobby” giving me orders concerning Campus Watch, confirming the falsehood of their initial claim" and furthermore added

Campus Watch is to Middle East studies as political analysis to politics, film criticism to movies, and consumer reports to manufacturing; we provide assessments for the public. Unlike politicians, actors, and business executives, who accept criticism with good grace, academics howl with umbrage at being judged.

=== Response ===
According to Campus Watch, it "critiques Middle East studies in North America regardless of whether they address Israel." In response to what it refers to as "a campaign of vilification and distortion" by critics, Campus Watch states:

- Campus Watch supports the unencumbered freedom of speech of all scholars, regardless of their views.
- Campus Watch takes no position on individual academic appointments.
- Academic freedom does not mean freedom from criticism; to the contrary, no one enjoys privileges in the free marketplace of ideas.
- The charge of "McCarthyism" has come up so often that we address this in a separate study which demonstrates why the charge is ignorant, intolerant, and ultimately self-serving.
- We challenge scholars of Middle Eastern studies to abandon the crude resort to insults and engage Campus Watch on the substance of our analysis.
