= Middle East Review of International Affairs =

- Language: English
- Edited by: Jonathan Spyer

Publication details
- Publisher: Rubin Center for Research in International Affairs

Standard abbreviations
- ISO 4: Middle East Rev. Int. Aff.

Indexing
- ISSN: 1565-8996
- OCLC no.: 807892489

Links
- Journal homepage

Middle East Review of International Affairs (MERIA) was a quarterly, peer-reviewed journal covering the Middle East.

MERIA was founded by Barry Rubin and edited by Jonathan Spyer. the last published issue was Vol. 21, No. 3 (Fall/Winter 2017). MERIA was published by the Rubin Center for Research in International Affairs of the Interdisciplinary Center (IDC) in Israel.

The Rubin Center for Research in International Affairs also published MERIA News, a monthly magazine on Middle East studies; MERIA Research Guides; and MERIABooks, collections of articles from the journal and other sources. According to Rubin's website for MERIA, the mission of the publication is "to advance research on the Middle East and [to] foster scholarly communication and cooperation," and MERIA is a "non-partisan publication involving people across the geographical and political spectrum."
