= The Rushdie Affair: The Novel, the Ayatollah, and the West =

1990 non-fiction book by Daniel Pipes

- Author: Daniel Pipes
- Language: English
- Subject: Islam
- Publication date: 1990
- Publication place: United States
- Media type: Print (Hardcover and Paperback)
- ISBN: 1412838819

The Rushdie Affair: The Novel, the Ayatollah, and the West is a book written by historian Daniel Pipes, published in 1990 by Birch Lane. It focuses on events surrounding The Satanic Verses. The afterword was written by Koenraad Elst. The paperback edition was released by Voice of India in 1998.

The first part of the book describes The Satanic Verses and Ayatollah Khomeini's edict, explaining why Rushdie's book became a controversy. The second part describes responses to the text and criticizes censorship of the book in some countries. The book's publication was delayed after the original publisher, Basic Books, dropped it due to seeming "commercially unviable".

== Reception ==
Edward Mortimer of The New York Times called the book "an extremely well-written and clear analysis of the issues raised". The book was also described as "lucid, balanced, often startling and ultimately convincing analysis" and of "primary importance" in the broader conversation of the topic. Amir Taheri of the LA Times praised Pipes for clearly communicating his own views rather than attempting to seem unbiased. The book was roundly considered to be a balanced understanding of the topic from multiple angles. François Dupuis-Déri of Columbia University wrote that Pipes' book can be understood in the neoconservative idea of clash of civilizations.

Emilie Réné argued that Pipes' essay "suffers from oversimplification".
