= Militant Islam Reaches America =

- Author: Daniel Pipes
- Language: English
- Subject: Islamism
- Publisher: Norton & Company
- Publication date: August 2002
- Publication place: United States
- Media type: Print (Hardcover, Paperback), E-book
- Pages: 326
- ISBN: 978-0393325317
- OCLC: 237830201

Militant Islam Reaches America is a book written by historian Daniel Pipes, published in 2002. It focuses on Islamic fundamentalism and Islamism, reflecting Pipes' view that, as he said in 1995, "Unnoticed by most Westerners, war has been unilaterally declared on Europe and the United States."

The book is a collection of Pipes' essays, published in the decade that ended in 2001.

In Militant Islam Pipes contradicts the consensus view of scholars and journalists including Judith Miller, Fouad Ajami, Olivier Roy who argued in the wake of the September 11 attacks that militant Islam of the type represented by Al Qaeda had peaked and was fading into insignificance; Pipes asserted that Islamism had been on the ascendant for a full quarter-century, and was on the ascent.
