= Jonathan Spyer =

- יונתן ספייר
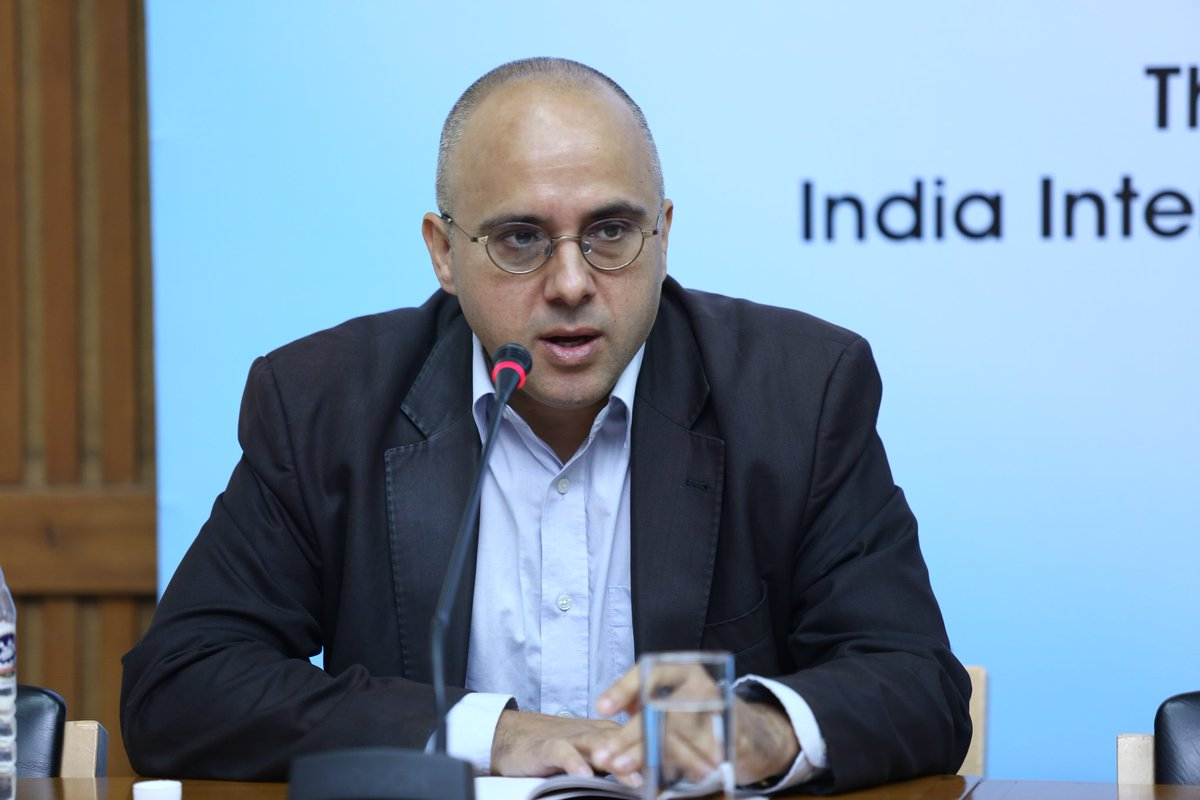
- Education: SOAS (MA); London School of Economics (PhD)
- Occupations: analyst, writer, journalist
- Website: jonathanspyer.com

Jonathan Spyer (Hebrew: יונתן ספייר, Arabic: جوناثان سباير) is a British-Israeli analyst, writer, and journalist of Middle Eastern affairs. He is director of research at the Middle East Forum, editor of Middle East Quarterly magazine, a fellow at the Jerusalem Institute for Strategy and Security, a freelance security analyst and correspondent for Jane's Information Group, and a columnist for The Jerusalem Post.

Spyer is the author of Days of the Fall: A Reporter's Journey in the Syria and Iraq Wars (Routledge, 2017), based on his numerous trips to Syria and Iraq, and The Transforming Fire: The Rise of the Israel-Islamist Conflict (Bloomsbury, 2010).

== Biography ==
Spyer was raised in London. He is of Russian Jewish and Central Asian heritage. Spyer immigrated to Israel from Britain in 1991. He earned a PhD in International Relations from the London School of Economics and a master's degree in Middle East Politics from the School of Oriental and African Studies (SOAS) in London. From 1992 to 1993, he served in the 188th Armored Brigade of the Israel Defense Forces and fought in the 2006 Lebanon War as a reservist. During that war, Spyer's tank was hit by two Kornet missiles, while deployed in a valley beneath the town of Al-Khiam.

Spyer resides in Jerusalem.

In September, 2020, Spyer revealed that he had been banned from travel to the US, on the grounds of Section 212 of the US Immigration and Nationality Act 'which prohibits issuance of a visa to a person who at any time engaged in terrorist activities or was associated with a terrorist organization.' Spyer wrote of his suspicion that his acquaintance with senior officials of the PKK might have been the cause. The ban was subsequently rescinded.

== Career ==
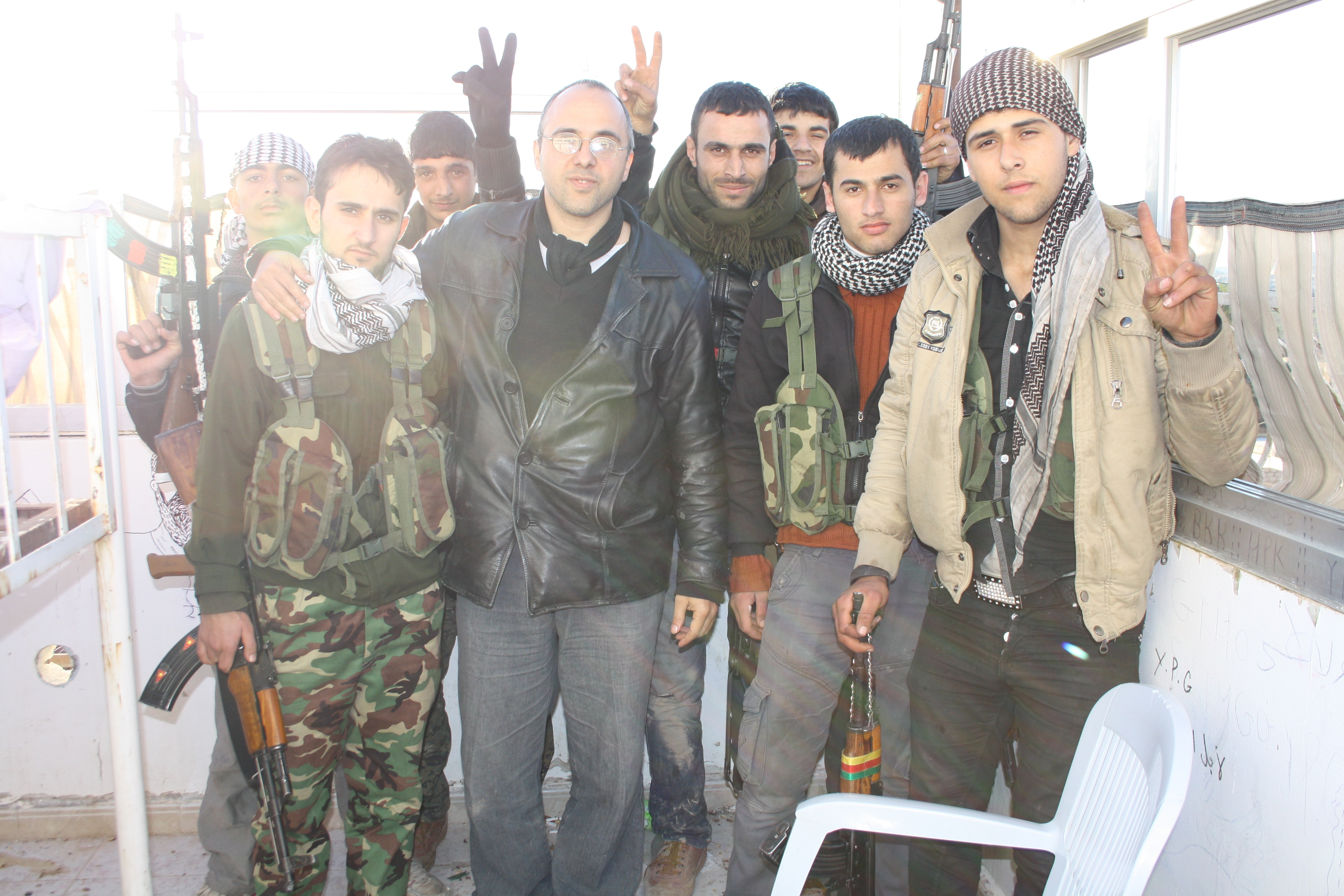
Jonathan Spyer posing with YPG fighters in Ras al-Ayn, northeastern Syria.

Spyer is director of research at the Middle East Forum, a freelance security analyst and correspondent for Jane's Information Group, a fellow at the Jerusalem Institute for Strategy and Security, and a columnist for The Jerusalem Post.

In the 2010s, Spyer traveled to Syria and Iraq numerous times, generally for around two-week periods. He spent about half the time of his trips in Kurdish-held areas. These experiences were the basis for Spyer's 2017 book, Days of the Fall: A Reporter’s Journey in the Syria and Iraq Wars, published by Routledge.

In October 2014, Spyer revealed evidence of possession and use of chemical weapons, likely mustard gas, by the Islamic State in Iraq and Syria (ISIS), in northern Syria. In June, 2015, Spyer traveled with the Iraqi Shia militia Ktaeb Hizballah in Iraq's Anbar Province and observed the militia in action against Islamic State forces. He also interviewed the movement's leader Abu Mahdi al-Muhandis at this time. In April 2017, Spyer traveled to regime-controlled Syria under his British passport as part of a government-sponsored media tour. On that trip, he posed as a British supporter of the Syrian government, interviewed Syrian government ministers and was photographed with Syrian Minister of Reconciliation Ali Haidar and Minister of Information, Mohammed Tourjeman. In January 2018, Al Arabiya reported that Syrian President Bashar al-Assad fired Tourjeman for permitting Spyer, an Israeli, entry into the country.

Spyer has reported extensively from Ukraine. He was present at the Maidan protests in Kyiv in 2013. He also reported from Kyiv in early March, 2022, and from the Donbas front in 2022 and 2023.

In 2022, Spyer revealed evidence of a secret network of prisons maintained by the Turkish government and its militia allies in Syria, in which more than 8000 Syrians have been incarcerated. The revelations led to discussion in the US Congress and the inclusion of a reference to the 'unlawful prisons' in the House Appropriations Bill of 2024. Spyer was also involved in efforts to designate the Iranian Islamic Revolutionary Guards Corps (IRGC) and its allied militias as terrorist organizations. He presented evidence to the UK Parliament in this regard.

In 2024, Spyer was involved in efforts to free Fawzia Amin Sido, an Iraqi Yezidi woman held captive in Gaza. Sido was freed in October of that year.

Spyer reported on the Israel-Hamas war of 2023, and entered the Gaza Strip accompanying Israeli forces five times during the course of the war. He has also reported from the Israeli controlled zone in southern Lebanon.

Spyer's reporting and analysis of Middle Eastern affairs has been published in numerous outlets including The Wall Street Journal, The Guardian, The Times, The Weekly Standard, Foreign Policy, and The American Interest.

== Books ==
- Days of the Fall: A Reporter's Journey in the Syria and Iraq Wars. Routledge. 2017. ISBN 9781351359245.
- The Rise of Nationalism: The Arab World, Turkey, and Iran. Simon and Schuster. 2014. ISBN 9781633559240.
- The Transforming Fire: The Rise of the Israel-Islamist Conflict. Bloomsbury Publishing. 2010. ISBN 9781441111814.
