= Robert Spencer =

Robert or Bob Spencer may refer to:

== Arts and entertainment ==
- Robert Spencer (artist) (1879–1931), American painter
- Robert L. Spencer (1920–2014), American fashion designer
- Bob Spencer (born 1957), Australian guitarist
- J. Robert Spencer (born 1969), American actor and singer

== Nobility ==
- Robert Spencer of Spencer Combe (died 1510), English landowner
- Robert Spencer, 1st Baron Spencer of Wormleighton (1570–1627), English peer
- Robert Spencer, 1st Viscount Teviot (1629–1694), Scottish peer
- Robert Spencer, 2nd Earl of Sunderland (1641–1702), English statesman and nobleman
- Robert Spencer, 4th Earl of Sunderland (1701–1729), British peer

== Others ==
- Lord Robert Spencer (1747–1831), British politician
- Robert Cavendish Spencer (1791–1830), English naval officer
- Robert Nelson Spencer (1877–1961), American Episcopal bishop and hymn writer
- Robert Spencer (doctor) (1889–1969), American abortionist
- Robert Spencer (author) (born 1962), American critic of Islam

== See also ==
- Bobbie Spencer, character in American soap opera General Hospital
- Spencer family
