= Islam and secularism =

Relationship between Islam and secularism

Secularism—that is, the separation of religion from civic affairs and the state—has been a controversial concept in Islamic political thought, owing in part to historical factors and in part to the ambiguity of the concept itself. In the Muslim world, the notion has acquired strong negative connotations due to its association with removal of Islamic influences from the legal and political spheres under foreign colonial domination, as well as attempts to restrict public religious expression by some secularist nation states. Thus, secularism has often been perceived as a foreign ideology imposed by invaders and perpetuated by post-colonial ruling elites, and is frequently misunderstood to be equivalent to irreligion or anti-religion.

Especially in the late 19th to mid-20th century, some Muslim thinkers advocated secularism as a way to strengthen the Islamic world in the face of Russian, British and French colonialism. Some have advocated secularism in the sense of political order that does not impose any single interpretation of sharia (Ali Abdel Raziq, Mohamed Arkoun, and Mahmoud Mohammed Taha); argued that such a political order would not/does not violate Islam (Abdullah Saeed); and that combined with constitutionalism and human rights, is more consistent with Islamic history than modern visions of an Islamic state (Abdullahi Ahmed An-Na'im). Orthodox Islamic scholars and proponents of Islamism (political Islam) strongly oppose limiting Islam to matters of personal belief, and also strongly advocate for an Islam that encompasses law, politics, economics, culture and every other aspect of the lives of its citizens. Islamist pioneer Abul A'la Maududi claimed that the goal of secularists was not to ameliorate tensions and divisions in multi-religious societies, but to avoid the "restraints of morality and divine guidance", and thus eliminate "all morality, ethics, or human decency from the controlling mechanisms of society".

A number of pre-modern polities in the Islamic world demonstrated some level of separation between religious and political authority, the loss of power of the caliphate being a major reason for that, even if they did not adhere to the modern concept of a state with no official religion or religion-based laws. Today, some Muslim-majority countries define themselves as or are regarded as secular. Many of them have a dual legal system in which Muslims can bring familial and financial disputes to sharia courts whose jurisdiction varies from country to country but usually includes marriage, divorce, inheritance, and guardianship.

== Definition ==
Secularism is an ambiguous concept that can be understood to refer to a number of policies and ideas—anticlericalism, atheism, state neutrality toward religion, the separation of religion from state, banishment of religious symbols from the public sphere, or disestablishment (separation of church and state, although Islam has no institution corresponding to this sense of "church"). Secularism has been categorized into two types, "hard" or "assertive" and "soft" or "passive"—"hard" being irreligious, considering religion illegitimate and seeking to discourage and weaken religious faith as much as possible (an example being found under Communist governments); "soft" secularism emphasizes tolerance, and neutrality and seeking to exclude "the state from any involvement in doctrine", and exclude "upholders of any doctrine from using the coercive powers of the state. (Note: While neither Bernard Lewis nor Mansoor Alam use the terms "hard" and "soft" to describe types of secularism, both refer to the religious policies of Communism as distinct from the separation-of-church-and-state secularism of western countries.: Lewis describes two kinds of secularism: Marxist-Leninist secularism: "There is a kind of secularism which flourished especially in eastern Europe, though it has its supporters elsewhere ... Its adherents are atheists, but not godless. ... They have no religion, but they certainly have a church, complete with scriptures and dogmas, prelates and heirarchs, orthodoxies, heresies, and an inquisition to detect and extirpate them ..."; non-irreligious secularism: "The secularism that emerged in western Europe in the seventeenth century and was established by the American and in another way, the French revolutions in the eighteenth century was of quite a different kind Its purpose was not to establish and enforce irreligion as a new state doctrine but, rather to preclude the state from any involvement in doctrine and to prevent the upholders of any doctrine from using the coercive powers of the state".; Mansoor Alam doesn't even include Communism/Marxism-Leninism as a type of secularism, only as something ill-informed Muslim scholars confuse with actual (i.e. soft) secularism. In reality "... [an] attitude of non-discrimination between various religions and their sects is the essence and core of secularism. Nevertheless, ulema in general and Pakistani ulema, in particular, feel such antipathy for this concept that they threaten to come out in the street and use violence at the very mention of this word in the context of Pakistan. The fact is that they confuse secularism with communism."; Jakir Al Faruki and Md. Roknuzzaman Siddiky do talk about hard and soft secularism, but mainly they use different terms for the "two perspectives on secularism" in the Muslim world: "(i) radical or extremist" and "(ii) moderate or liberal". The radical or extremist sort is not communism, which they ignore, but Kemal Atatürk's Turkish secularism.; Radicals believe "religion is the foremost obstacle for the modernization, development and democracy" and should kept under the control of the state and only allowed in the private lives of individuals. This approach was embraced by Kemal Atatürk, but also by Gamal Abdel Nasser (1918-1970) of Egypt, Saddam Hussein (1937-2006) of Iraq, Reza Shah Pahlavi (1878-1944) of Iran and Ḥafiz al-Assad (1930-2000) of Syria, Islam Karimov of Azerbaijan (1938-2016).; moderate or liberal secularism is based on pluralism, tolerance of religious difference, and neutrality to all religions. Supporters argue that Islam is compatible with separation of religion and state, and that this separation has been practiced through Islamic history.)

There is no word in Arabic, Persian, or Turkish corresponding exactly to the English term "secularism". According to Mansoor Alam, the "common and prevalent" translation of secularism in the four main languages of Muslims—Arabic, Persian, Urdu —is ladeenia or ghair-mazhabee and mulhideen which means "without religion" or "non religious". Alam protests that contrary to these translations, definitions of secularism found in "western languages" all indicate that secularism "does not mean anti-religious or anti-God", but has come to mean freedom of religion and non-interference by the state in religion and vice versa. Nader Hashemi writing in The Oxford Encyclopedia of the Islamic World, gives two more words commonly used as translations in Arabic : ʿilmānīyah (from the Arabic word for science) and ʿalmanīyah (apparently derived from the Arabic word for "world"). (The latter term, first appeared at the end of the nineteenth century in the dictionary Muhit al-Muhit written by the Christian Lebanese scholar Butrus al-Bustani.) In Persian, one finds the loan word sekūlarîzm, while in Turkish both laiklik (borrowed from the French laïcité) and sekülerizm are used to define the term; although both can differ in definitions within Turkish literature, due to the confusion caused by the uncertain and incorrect usage of these two words, the meanings differ depending on context and the source.

== Scriptural basis ==
According to Mansoor Alam (who dismisses "hard secularism" from consideration as a policy for Muslim governments), Quranic verses that "clearly and unambiguously" support freedom of religion by assigning to the Prophet the job of "conveying the message of Allah" to humanity rather than imposing Islam on them; and that give each person personal responsibility "for his/her own acts and deeds" are:

- Who respond to their Lord, establish prayer, conduct their affairs by mutual consultation, and donate from what We have provided for them; and who enforce justice when wronged. (42:38-39)
- Those who believe and those who are Jews and Christians and Sabians, (star worshippers), whoever believes in Allah and the Last Day and does righteous deeds shall have their reward with their Lord. On them will be no fear nor shall they grieve. (2:62)
- Say (O Muslims) we believe in Allah and that which has been sent down to us and that which has been sent down to Ibrahim, Ismail, Ishaq, Yaqub, and the tribes, (his 12 sons) and that which has been given to Musa and Isa and that which has been given to (all) the Prophets from their Lord. We make no distinction between any of them. (2:136)
- La Ikraha fid Din; there is no compulsion in Religion. (2:256)
- Say (O! Prophet) to these disbelievers; I worship not that which you worship, nor will you worship that which I worship, and I shall not worship that which you are worshipping, nor will you worship that which I worship, To you be your religion and to me my religion. (109)
- Verily proofs have come unto you from your Lord, so whosoever sees, will do so for (the good of) his own self, and whosoever blinds himself will do so to his own harm, and I (Muhammad) am not a watcher over you. (6:104)
- And as for those who take as guardians others besides Him, Allah is watcher over them, and you (O Muhammad) are not a guardian over them. (42:6)
- Had Allah willed, they would not have taken others besides Him in worship. And We have not made you a watcher over them nor are you a trustee over them. (6:107)
- To each among you we have prescribed a law and a clear way. If Allah had so willed, He would have made you one nation. (5:48)

Jakir Al Faruki and Md. Roknuzzaman Siddiky describe the Medina Covenant of Muhammad (also known as Constitution of Medina), as a "secular constitution".

== History and overview ==
=== Early history ===
Scholar Bernard Lewis points out that during its "first formative centuries", Christianity was separate from and often oppressed by the state, while "from the lifetime of its founder Islam was the state ... Islam was thus associated with the exercise of power from the very beginning".

==== Evidence of separation of religion and state ====
A number of scholars have argued that a separation of religion and political power is not inconsistent with early Islamic history. The Sudanese-born Islamic scholar Abdullahi Ahmed An-Na'im has argued that a secular state built on constitutionalism, human rights and full citizenship is more consistent with Islamic history than modern visions of an Islamic state. Ira M. Lapidus notes that religious and political power was united while the Prophet Muhammad was leading the ummah, resulting in a non-secular state. But Lapidus states that by the 10th century, some governments in the Muslim world had developed an effective separation of religion and politics, due to political control passing "into the hands of generals, administrators, governors, and local provincial lords; the Caliphs had lost all effective political power". These governments were still officially Islamic and committed to the religion, but religious authorities had developed their own hierarchies and bases of power separate from the political institutions governing them:

In the same period, religious communities developed independently of the states or empires that ruled them. The ulama regulated local communal and religious life by serving as judges, administrators, teachers, and religious advisers to Muslims. The religious elites were organized according to religious affiliation into Sunni schools of law, Shi'ite sects, or Sufi tariqas. [...] In the wide range of matters arising from the Shari'a - the Muslim law - the 'ulama' of the schools formed a local administrative and social elite whose authority was based upon religion.

Lapidus argues that the religious and political aspects of Muslim communal life came to be separated by Arab rebellions against the Caliphate, the emergence of religious activity independent of the actual authority of the Caliphs, and the emergence of the Hanbali school of law. According to Jakir Al Faruki, secularism was found "for centuries" under the "tolerant and liberal" reign of most of the Mughal rulers "in particular, Akbar's regime (1556-1605)"

Researcher Olivier Roy argues that "a defacto separation between political power" of sultans and emirs and religious power of the caliph was "created and institutionalized ... as early as the end of the first century of the hegira". Nonetheless, what has been lacking in the Muslim world was and is "political thought regarding the autonomy of this space." No positive law was developed outside of sharia. The sovereign's religious function was to defend the Islamic community against its enemies, institute the sharia, ensure the public good (maslaha). The state was an instrument to enable Muslims to live as good Muslims and Muslims were to obey the sultan if he did so. The legitimacy of the ruler was "symbolized by the right to coin money and to have the Friday prayer (Jumu'ah khutba) said in his name."

The Umayyad caliphate was seen as a secular state by many Muslims at the time, some of whom disapproved of the lack of integration of politics and religion. This perception was offset by a steady stream of wars that aimed to expand Muslim rule past the caliphate's borders.

In early Islamic philosophy, Averroes presented an argument in The Decisive Treatise providing a justification for the emancipation of science and philosophy from official Ash'ari theology. Because of this, some consider Averroism a precursor to modern secularism.

=== Colonial and post colonial era ===
==== Muslim modernists and secularism ====
The concept of secularism was imported along with many of the ideas of post-Enlightenment modernity from Europe into the Muslim world, namely the Middle East and North Africa. Among Muslim intellectuals, the early debate on secularism centered mainly on the relationship between religion and state, and how this relationship was related to European successes in science, technology and governance. In the debate on the relationship between religion and state, (in)separability of religious and political authorities in the Islamic world or status of the Caliph, was one of the biggest issues. Many Islamic modernist thinkers (especially from the late 19th century to the 1970s) argued against the inseparability of religious and political authorities in the Islamic world and described the system of separation between religion and state (along with concepts like freedom, nationalism, and democracy) within their ideal Islamic world. (The search for harmony in a multi-confessional population by Baathists, other nationalists, including non-Muslim Arabs, was also part of support for secularism.)

Muhammad ʿAbduh (1849–1905), a prominent Muslim modernist thinker, claimed in his book Al-Idtihad fi Al-Nasraniyya wa Al-Islam (Persecution in Christianity and in Islam) that no one had exclusive religious authority in the Islamic world. He argued that even the Caliph did not have religious authority over common Muslims because the caliph was neither infallible nor the person to whom divine revelation had been given. ʿAbduh argued that the Caliph should have the respect of the umma but not rule it; the unity of the umma is a moral unity that does not prevent its division into national states.

Abd al-Rahman al-Kawakibi (c. 1854–c.1902), in his book Taba'i' Al-Istibdad (The Characteristics of Tyranny), discussed the relationship between religion and despotism, arguing that "while most religions tried to enslave the people to the holders of religious office who exploited them, the original Islam was built on foundations of political freedom standing between democracy and aristocracy." Al-Kawakibi suggested that people can achieve a non-religious national unity, saying: "Let us take care of our lives in this world and let the religions rule in the next world." Moreover, in his second book Umm Al-Qura (The Mother of Villages) his most explicit statement with regard to the question of religion and state appeared in an appendix to the book, where he presented a dialogue between the Muslim scholar from India and an amir. The amir expressed his opinion that "religion is one thing and the government is another ... The administration of religion and the administration of the government were never united in Islam."

The thoughts of Rashid Rida (1865–1935) about the separation of religion and state had some similarities with ʿAbduh and Al-Kawakibi. According to the scholar, Eliezer Tauber:

He was of the opinion that according to Islam 'the rule over the nation is in its own hands ... and its government is a sort of a republic. The caliph has no superiority in law over the lowest of the congregation; he only executes the religious law and the will of the nation.' And he added: 'For the Muslims, the caliph is not infallible (ma'sum) and not the source of revelation.' And therefore, 'the nation has the right to depose the imam-caliph, if it finds a reason for doing so.'

Rida provided details of his ideas about the future Arab empire in a document titled the "General Organic Law of the Arab Empire". Rida argued that the general administrative policy of the future empire should be managed by a president, a council of deputies to be elected from the entire empire, and a council of ministers to be chosen by the president from among the deputies. There, the caliph must recognize the 'General Organic Law' and abide by it. He would manage all the religious matters of the empire. Rida's ideal Islamic empire would be administered in practice by a president, while the caliph would administer only religious affairs and would be obliged to recognize the organic law of the empire and abide by it.

As seen above, these arguments about the separability of religious and political authorities in the Islamic world were greatly connected with the presence of the Caliphate. Therefore, the abolishment of the Caliphate by the Turkish government in 1924 had considerable influence on such arguments among Muslim intellectuals.

A work even more controversial than those mentioned above is a 1925 tract, Al-Islam Wa Usul Al-Hukm (Islam and the Foundations of Governance) by Ali Abd al-Raziq (1888–1966), an Islamic Scholar and Shari'a judge. He argued that there was no clear evidence in the Quran and the hadith, which would justify a common assumption—that to accept the authority of the caliph is a religious obligation. Furthermore, he claimed that it was not even necessary that the ummah should be politically united and that religion has nothing to do with one form of government rather than another. He argued that nothing in Islam forbids Muslims from destroying their old political system and building a new one on the basis of the newest conceptions of the human spirit and the experience of nations. This publication caused a fierce debate especially as he recommended that religion can be separated from government and politics; and he was later removed from his position. Franz Rosenthal argued that in Abd al-Raziq "we meet for the first time a consistent, unequivocal theoretical assertion of the purely and exclusively religious character of Islam".

Taha Hussein (1889–1973), an Egyptian writer, was also an advocate for the separation of religion and politics from a viewpoint of Egyptian nationalism. Hussein believed that Egypt always had been part of Western civilization and that Egypt had its renaissance in the nineteenth century and had re-Europeanized itself. For him, the distinguishing mark of the modern world is that it has brought about a virtual separation of religion and civilization, each in its own sphere. It is therefore quite possible to take the bases of civilization from Europe without its religion, Christianity. Moreover, he believed that it is easier for Muslims than for Christians, since Islam has no priesthood, and so in his view, there was no vested interest in the control of religion over society.

==== 21st century Muslims and secularism ====
Writing c. 2013, Mansoor Alam argues that the "plunge into bloodshed" between Shias, Sunnis and other sects in Pakistan since the mid-1980s have "made mosques, imambargahs and even cemeteries unsafe places to visit". The "only antidote" the polarization of sects is the one Christians learnt after "a few hundred years of internecine bloodshed", i.e. secularism.

Faisal Al Yafai, a columnist for The National, wrote in 2012 that secularism in the Arab World had declined and that "There is no major political party in the Arab world that would today be understood as secular." Khaldoun H. Shami, a scholar and researcher in media and secularism at the University of East Anglia argues that Secularism is problematic in the region, often associated with atheism, colonialism, or westernization. He emphasizes a “Middle Eastern model” of secularism — not simply importing Western categories, but a version that is responsive to local culture, religious diversity, social and political norms. He also situates it as connected with, or in tension with, issues such as minorities, militarism, and state-religion relationships.

==== Establishment of secularism ====
John L. Esposito, a professor of international affairs and Islamic studies, points out:

the post-independent period witnessed the emergence of modern Muslim states whose pattern of development was heavily influenced by and indebted to Western secular paradigms or models. Saudi Arabia and Turkey reflected the two polar positions. [...] The majority of Muslim states chose a middle ground in nation building, borrowing heavily from the West and relying on foreign advisers and Western-educated elites.

Esposito also argues that in many modern Muslim countries, the role of Islam in state and society as a source of legitimization for rulers, state, and government institutions was greatly decreased, though the separation of religion and politics was not total. However, while most Muslim governments replaced Islamic law with legal systems inspired by western secular codes, Muslim family law (marriage, divorce, and inheritance) remained in force.

==== Questions of suitability ====
Opinion polls indicate a majority of Muslims believe that Islam does not separate religion from the state, unlike Christianity, and many Muslims around the world welcome a significant role for Islam in their countries' political life. Historian Bernard Lewis argues secularism developed in Europe as a reaction to bitter and devastating religious wars of the sixteenth and seventeenth century—a malady Islam did not suffer from. Islamic history has had "regional, tribal, and dynastic wars with ... a religious coloration", "great power rivalries" such as between Sunni Ottoman Empire and Shia Persian one, but not religious wars; religious discrimination but not persecution, prosecution of disloyal apostates but not campaigns against heresy and the burning of heretics; and no scripture such as Matthew 22:21 "Render unto Caesar the things that are Caesar's, and unto God the things that are God's". (Lewis ends by noting that in the late 20th century the problem of religion and state interfering in each other's affairs may have spread to the Islamic world and that "Jews and Muslims may perhaps have caught a Christian disease and might therefore consider a Christian remedy."

==== Opposition from Islamic revivalists ====
The resurgence of Islam/Islamic revival, beginning with the Iranian revolution of 1978–9, defied the illusions of advocates of secularization theory. The resurgence of Islam in politics in the most modernizing of Muslim countries, such as Egypt, Algeria and Turkey, betrayed expectations of those who believed religion should be at the margins not the center of public life. Furthermore, in most cases, it was not a rural but an urban phenomenon, and its leaders and supporters were educated professionals. A striking example of the power of the religious revival to reverse secularism was in Iraq where in 1990-1991 the leader of the putatively secular Arab nationalist Ba'ath Party (Saddam Hussein), "finding himself at war, inscribed Allahu Akbar on his banner and, after seeing the Prophet in a dream, proclaimed jihad against the infidels."

Scholars like Vali Nasr argue that the secular elites in the Muslim world were imposed by colonial powers to maintain hegemony. Islamists believe that Islam fuses religion and politics, with normative political values determined by the divine texts. It is argued that this has historically been the case and the secularist/modernist efforts at secularizing politics are little more than jahiliyyah (pre-Islamic ignorance), kafir (unbelief/infidelity), irtidad (apostasy) and atheism. Mawlana Mawdudi, founder of Jamaat e-Islami, proclaimed in 1948 that those who participated in secular politics were raising the flag of revolt against God and his messenger.

==== Opposition from Conservative Muslims ====
Saudi scholars denounce secularism as un-Islamic. Prior to the reign of Crown Prince Mohammed bin Salman, the Saudi Arabian Directorate of Ifta', Preaching and Guidance, issued a directive decreeing that whoever believes that there is a guidance (huda) more perfect than that of the Prophet (as spelled out in hadith and other literature), or that someone else's rule is better than that of the Prophet's, is a kafir.

It lists a number of specific tenets which would be regarded as a serious departure from the precepts of Islam, punishable according to Sharia/Islamic law. For example:

- The belief that human-made laws and constitutions are superior to Sharia/Islamic law.
- The opinion that Islam is limited to one's relation with God, and has nothing to do with the daily affairs of life.
- To disapprove of the application of the hudud (legal punishments of Sharia/Islamic law) that they are incompatible in the modern age.
- And whoever allows what God has prohibited is a kafir (unbeliever).

In the view of Tariq al-Bishri, "secularism and Islam cannot agree except by means of talfiq [falsification, i.e. combining the doctrines of more than one school of Islam], or by each turning away from its true meaning."

Mansoor Alam argues that the because the Ottoman and the Mughal empires were disintegrating at the same time as Britain, France and Russia were colonizing areas of the Muslim world, this:

created a perception among the Muslims that secularism and democracy together with modern scientific revolution were responsible not only for the demise of the formal role of the church in state affairs but also for the decline of Muslim power. ... Muslim orthodoxy developed an antipathy for western politics, economics, science and technology. It is well known that the Saudi conservatives had bitterly opposed the introduction of the telephone and television in Saudi Arabia."

==== Questions of connection with authoritarianism ====
A number of scholars have argued that secular governments in Muslim countries at the end of the 20th century, have become more repressive and authoritarian to protect their rule (and their secularism) and from the spread of Islamism, or used the threat of Islamism as an excuse to become more authoritarian. Some (Fareed Zakaria) have argued that when government repression increases discontent, hostility to the secularism the government is allegedly trying to protect—and the popularity of its pious Islamist enemies—also grows.

After Islamists won elections in the secularist, nationalist states of Turkey and Algeria, the elections were overturned by the militaries in order to "protect secularism". In Algeria, a military coup followed the sweeping 1991 victory of the Islamic Salvation Front (FIS). The FIS supporters rose up and a bloody civil war followed. In Turkey, the Welfare Party was victorious in 1995 elections, but was forced to resign from the office by the Turkish military in February 1997 with a military intervention which is known as "post-modern coup". No civil war followed that intervention but a later version of the Welfare party, (the AKP), went on to win power in 2001 and has become known for both its authoritarianism and its elimination of secularists from positions of power. (see below)

In some countries, the fear of Islamist takeover via democratic processes has led to authoritarian measures against Islamist political parties. "The Syrian regime was able to capitalize on the fear of Islamists coming to power to justify the massive clampdown on the Syrian Muslim Brotherhood." When American diplomats asked Hosni Mubarak to give more rights to the press and stop arresting intellectuals, Mubarak declined and said, "If I do what you ask, the fundamentalists will take over the government in Egypt. Do you want that?" When President Bill Clinton asked Yasser Arafat to establish democracy in Palestine in 2001, Yasser Arafat replied similarly, claiming that with "a democratic system Islamist Hamas will surely take control of the government".

Fareed Zakaria (writing in 2003) argues less authoritarianism might weaken the Islamist enemies of secularism, pointed out that (before its 2011 revolution) Egypt banned Islamic fundamentalists from running for election for parliament, even though that parliament was "utterly powerless". Had they (and other authoritarian Muslim countries) not done so, the fundamentalists might "stop being seen as distant heroes" by the Muslim masses and "be viewed instead as local politicians." Fred Halliday and others have pointed out that increasing authoritarianism has also left the mosque the only safe place in much of the Muslim world to voice political opposition.

==== Secular feminism ====
Azza Karam described secular feminists in 1988 as follows:

Secular feminists firmly believe in grounding their discourse outside the realm of any religion, whether Muslim or Christian, and placing it instead within the international human rights discourse. They do not 'waste their time' attempting to harmonize religious discourses with the concept and declarations pertinent to human rights. To them, religion is respected as a private matter for each individual, but it is totally rejected as a basis from which to formulate any agenda on women's emancipation. By so doing, they avoid being caught up in interminable debates on the position of women with religion.

Generally, secular feminist activists call for total equality between the sexes, attempt to ground their ideas on women's rights outside religious frameworks, perceive Islamism as an obstacle to their equality and a linkage to patriarchal values. They argue that secularism was important for protecting civil rights.

==== Arab world ====
Islamic scholar Prof. Dr. Gudrun Krämer notes that currently there is no Arab country which is secular or which exclusively separated religion from state.

== Secular states with majority Muslim populations ==
Of the 50 Muslim-majority countries in the world, the following 21 countries are listed to be secular:

- Albania
- Azerbaijan
- Bosnia-Herzegovina
- Burkina Faso
- Chad
- Guinea
- Indonesia (Note: The province of Aceh in Indonesia has provisions of sharia laws which applies mandatorily to its Muslim residents.)
- Kazakhstan
- Kosovo
- Kyrgyzstan
- Mali
- Niger
- Nigeria (Note: 12 Northern states in Nigeria apply full Sharia law.)
- North Cyprus
- Senegal
- Sierra Leone
- Sudan
- Tajikistan
- Turkey
- Turkmenistan
- Uzbekistan

== Secularist movements by state ==
=== Turkey ===
Secularism in Turkey was both dramatic and far-reaching as it filled the vacuum of the fall of the Ottoman Empire after World War I. Starting with an amendment to the constitution in 1928 eliminating state religion, Mustafa Kemal Atatürk led a political and cultural revolution. "Official Turkish modernity took shape basically through a negation of the Islamic Ottoman system and the adoption of a West-oriented mode of modernization."

- The Caliphate was abolished.
- Religious lodges and Sufi orders were banned.
- A secular civil code based on Swiss civil code was adopted to replace the previous codes based on Islamic law (shari'a, şeriat) outlawing all forms of polygamy, annulled religious marriages, granted equal rights to men and women, in matters of inheritance, marriage and divorce.
- The religious court system and institutions of religious education were abolished.
- The use of religion for political purposes was banned.
- A separate institution was created that dealt with the religious matters of the people.
- The alphabet was changed from Arabic to Latin.
- A portion of religious activity was moved to the Turkish language, including the adhan (ezan, call to prayer) which lasted until 1950. Today, there are only sermons (khutbah, hutbe) in Turkish.

Throughout the 20th century secularism was continuously challenged by Islamists. At the end of the 20th century and beginning of the 21st century, political Islamists and Islamic democrats such as the Welfare Party and Justice and Development Party (AKP) gained influence. In the 2002 elections the AKP came to power and (as of 2024) has held on to it with increasingly authoritarian methods; eliminating the "old secularist guard" from positions of authority and replacing them with members/supporters of the AKP; Islamizing education to "raise a devout generation" became government policy; reversing the role of the governmental body established to control and limit religious affairs (Diyanet), to promote a conservative (Hanafi Sunni) version of Islam.

=== Lebanon ===
Lebanon is a parliamentary democracy within the overall framework of Confessionalism, a form of consociationalism in which the highest offices are proportionately reserved for representatives from certain religious communities. A growing number of Lebanese, however, have organized against the confessionalist system, advocating for an installation of laïcité in the national government. The most recent expression of this secularist advocacy was the Laïque Pride march held in Beirut on April 26, 2010, as a response to Hizb ut-Tahrir's growing appeal in Beirut and its call to re-establish the Islamic caliphate.

=== Tunisia ===
Under the leadership of Habib Bourguiba (1956–1987), Tunisia's post independence government pursued a program of secularization.

Bourguiba modified laws regarding habous (religious endowments), secularized education and unified the legal system so that all Tunisians, regardless of religion, were subject to the state courts. He restricted the influence of the religious University of Ez-Zitouna and replaced it with a faculty of theology integrated into the University of Tunis, banned the headscarf for women, made members of the religious hierarchy state employees and ordered that the expenses for the upkeep of mosques and the salaries of preachers to be regulated.

Moreover, his best known legal innovations were the 'Code du Statut Personel' (CSP) the laws that govern issues related to the family: marriage, guardianship of children, inheritance and most importantly the abolishing of polygamy and making divorce subject to judicial review.

Bourguiba clearly wanted to undercut the religious establishment's ability to prevent his secularization program, and although he was careful to locate these changes within the framework of a modernist reading of Islam and presented them as the product of ijtihad (independent interpretation) and not a break with Islam, he became well known for his secularism. John Esposito says that "For Bourguiba, Islam represented the past; the west was Tunisia's only hope for a modern future."

Following increasing economic problems, Islamist movements came about in 1970 with the revival of religious teaching in Ez-Zitouna University and the influence which came from Arab religious leaders like Syrian and Egyptian Muslim Brotherhoods. There is also influence by Hizb ut-Tahrir, whose members issue a magazine in Tunis named Azeytouna. In the aftermath, the struggle between Bourguiba and Islamists became uncontrolled and in order to repress the opposition the Islamist leaderships were exiled, arrested and interrogated.

Ennahda Movement, also known as Renaissance Party or simply Ennahda, is a moderate Islamist political party in Tunisia. On 1 March 2011, after the secularist dictatorship of Zine El Abidine Ben Ali collapsed in the wake of the 2011 Tunisian revolution, Tunisia's interim government granted the group permission to form a political party. Since then it has become the biggest and most well-organized party in Tunisia, so far outdistancing its more secular competitors. In the Tunisian Constituent Assembly election, 2011, the first honest election in the country's history with a turn out of 51.1% of all eligible voters, the party won 37.04% of the popular vote and 89 (41%) of the 217 assembly seats, far more than any other party.

=== Egypt ===
Secularism in Egypt has had a very important role to play in both the history of Egypt and that of the Middle East. Egypt's first experience of secularism started with the British Occupation (1882–1952), the atmosphere which allowed the propagation of western ideas. In this environment, pro-secularist intellectuals like Yaqub Sarruf, Faris Nimr, Nicola Haddad who sought political asylum from Ottoman Rule were able to publish their work. This debate had then become a burning issue with the work of Egyptian Shaykh Ali abd al-Raziq (1888–1966), "The most momentous document in the crucial intellectual and religious debate of modern Islamic history"

By 1919, Egypt had its first political secular entity called the Hizb 'Almani (Secular Party) this name was later changed to the Wafd party. It combined secular policies with a nationalist agenda and had the majority support in the following years against both the rule of the king and the British influence. The Wafd party supported the allies during World War II and then proceeded to win the 1952 parliamentary elections, following these elections the prime minister was overthrown by the King leading to riots. These riots precipitated a military coup after which all political parties were banned including the Wafd and the Muslim Brotherhood.

The government of Gamel Abdel Nasser was secularist-nationalist in nature which at the time gathers a great deal of support both in Egypt and other Arab states. Key elements of Nasserism:

- Secularist-Nationalist dictatorship: No religious or other political movements allowed to impact government.
- Modernization, Industrialization and Nationalization; Socialist economy
- Concentration on Arab values, identity and nationalism rather than Muslim values, identity and nationalism.

Secular legacy of Nasser's administration subsequently influenced periods of Anwar Sadat and Hosni Mubarak and secularists ruled Egypt until 2011 Egyptian revolution. Nevertheless, the Egyptian Muslim Brotherhood has become one of the most influential movements in the Islamic world, particularly in the Arab world. For many years it was described as "semi-legal" and was the only opposition group in Egypt able to field candidates during elections. In the 2011–12 Egyptian parliamentary election, the political parties identified as "Islamist" (the Brotherhood's Freedom and Justice Party, Salafi Al-Nour Party and liberal Islamist Al-Wasat Party) won 75% of the total seats. Mohamed Morsi, an Islamist democrat of Muslim Brotherhood was the first democratically elected president of Egypt. Nowadays, most Egyptian proponents of secularism emphasize the link between secularism and 'national unity' between Coptic Christians and Muslims.

=== Syria ===
The process of secularization in Syria began under the French mandate in the 1920s and went on continuously under different governments since the independence. Syria at some point has been governed by the Arab nationalist Ba'ath Party between 1963 and 2024. The Ba'ath government combined Arab socialism with secular ideology and an authoritarian political system. The constitution guarantees religious freedom for every recognized religious community, including many Christian denominations. All schools are government-run and non-sectarian, although there is mandatory religious instruction, provided in Islam and/or Christianity. Political forms of Islam are not tolerated by the government. The Syrian legal system is primarily based on civil law, and was heavily influenced by the period of French rule. It is also drawn in part from the Egyptian law of Abdel Nasser, quite from the Ottoman Millet system and very little from Sharia. Syria has separate secular and religious courts. Civil and criminal cases are heard in secular courts, while the Sharia courts handle personal, family, and religious matters in cases between Muslims or between Muslims and non-Muslims. Non-Muslim communities have their own religious courts using their own religious law.

=== Iran ===
Following the military coup of 21 February 1921, Reza Khan had established himself as the dominant political personality in the country. Fearing that their influence might be diminished, the clergy of Iran proposed their support and persuaded him to assume the role of the Shah.

1925–1941: Reza Shah began to make some dramatic changes to Iranian society with the specific intention of westernization and removing religion from the public sphere. He changed religious schools to secular schools, built Iran's first secular university and banned the hijab in public. Nevertheless, the regime became totally undemocratic and authoritarian with the removal of Majles power (the first parliament in 1906) and the clampdown on free speech.

1951–1953: During the early 1950s, Prime Minister Mohammad Mosaddegh was again forming a secular government with a socialist agenda with the specific aim of reducing the power held by the clergy. However, his plan to nationalize the colonial oil interests held by the Anglo-Iranian Oil Company, (later British Petroleum), attracted the ire of the United Kingdom. In response, the United Kingdom with the help of the CIA, supported a coup that removed Mossadeq from power and reinstated Mohammad Reza Pahlavi.

1962–1963: Using the mandate of westernization, Mohammad Reza Pahlavi introduced the White Revolution, aiming to transform Iran into a westernized secular capitalist country.

1963–1980: Opposition rallied united behind Ayatollah Ruhollah Khomeini, and by the end of the decade the Shah was overthrown in the 1979 Islamic Revolution. The country became an authoritarian Islamic Republic which has lasted to date.

== See also ==
- Apostasy in Islam
- Application of sharia by country
- Islam and blasphemy
- Censorship in Islamic societies
- Cultural Muslims
- Democracy in the Middle East
- Decree on Islamic Defenders Front
- Secular education
- Talal Asad
- Sadik Al-Azm
- Progressive British Muslims
- Liberalism and progressivism within Islam
- Tolu-e-Islam
- M. A. Muqtedar Khan
- Irshad Manji
- Khaleel Mohammed
- Jaringan Islam Liberal
- Al-Mawrid
- Islam Yes, Islamic Party No

Islamism:

- Islamic state
- Khilafah

== Bibliography ==
- Addi, L. (2021). The Crisis of Muslim Religious Discourse: The Necessary Shift from Plato to Kant (1st ed.). Routledge. https://doi.org/10.4324/9781003227076
