= Middle East Forum =

US-based foreign policy think tank

- Abbreviation: MEF
- Formation: 1990; 36 years ago
- Type: 501(c)(3) nonprofit think tank
- Tax ID no.: 23-7749796
- Location: Philadelphia
- President: Daniel Pipes
- Revenue: $4.61 million (2024)
- Expenses: $4.58 million (2024)
- Website: www.meforum.org

The Middle East Forum (MEF) is an American conservative 501(c)(3) think tank founded in 1990 by Daniel Pipes, who now serves as its chairman. Gregg Roman serves as director of the forum. MEF became an independent non-profit organization in 1994. It publishes a journal, the Middle East Quarterly.

== History ==
The Middle East Forum was founded in 1990 by Daniel Pipes as an independent non-profit organization with the mission of "promoting American interests." In 2002, the MEF advocated for strong U.S. ties with Turkey, Israel, and other pro-American governments in the region, a stable price for oil, human rights, and peaceful conflict resolutions. It publishes the Middle East Quarterly and runs various advocacy programs. Pipes said in 2003 that "militant Islam is the problem and moderate Islam is the answer." The left-leaning Center for American Progress and the Southern Poverty Law Center have criticized the MEF for spreading anti-Islamic messages.

== Activities ==
=== Support for Tommy Robinson ===
In 2018, the MEF stated that it had been "heavily involved" in the release from prison of British anti-Islam activist and far-right political operative Tommy Robinson, who is best known as a co-founder, former spokesman and former leader of the English Defence League (EDL) organization, and for his service as a political adviser to the leader of the UK Independence Party (UKIP), Gerard Batten. They revealed that "the full resources of the Middle East Forum were activated to free Mr. Robinson", which included: conferring with Robinson's legal team and providing necessary funds; funding, organizing and staffing the "Free Tommy" London rallies on 9 June and 14 July, which was, they claim, reported by The Times, The Guardian, and The Independent; funding travel of the US congressman, Rep. Paul Gosar, Republican from Arizona, to London to address the rallies; and lobbied Sam Brownback, the State Department's ambassador-at-large for International Religious Freedom, to raise the issue with the UK's ambassador, which he did. The MEF has itself been considered a part of the counter-jihad movement.

Georgetown University's Bridge Initiative reported in 2018 that the MEF had received millions of dollars from Donors Capital Fund ($6,768,000), the William Rosenwald Family Fund, the Middle Road Foundation, and the Abstraction Fund.

=== Middle East Quarterly ===
Middle East Quarterly
- Discipline: Middle Eastern studies
- Language: English
- Edited by: Jonathan Spyer

Publication details
- History: 1994–present
- Publisher: Middle East Forum (United States)
- Frequency: Quarterly
- Open access: Yes

Standard abbreviations
- ISO 4: Middle East Q.

Indexing
- CODEN: MEQUFZ
- ISSN: 1073-9467
- LCCN: 94660065
- OCLC no.: 644061932

Links
- Journal homepage

Middle East Quarterly was founded in 1994 by Daniel Pipes and the current editor-in-chief is journalist and Middle East analyst Jonathan Spyer.

==== Reception ====
In 2002 Juan Cole, a professor at the University of Michigan and a Campus Watch target, accused the journal of making "scurrilous attacks on people". In 2014, Christopher A. Bail of Duke University described it as a "pseudo-academic" journal with editorial board members who share an ideological outlook, adding that while it appears to present legitimate academic research, it is regularly criticized "as a channel for anti-Muslim polemics".

==== Abstracting and indexing ====
The journal is abstracted and indexed in:

- EBSCO databases
- Index Islamicus
- International Bibliography of the Social Sciences
- Modern Language Association Database
- ProQuest databases
- Scopus

=== Campus Watch ===
In 2002, the Middle East Forum launched an initiative called Campus Watch that it said would identify "analytical failures, the mixing of politics with scholarship, intolerance of alternative views, apologetics, and the abuse of power over students" within academia. Winfield Myers is the director of Campus Watch.

Initially, Campus Watch published the profile of eight university professors and teachers, who, it said, were "hostile" to America and "preaching dangerous rhetoric to students". This led around 100 professors to accuse Campus Watch of "McCarthyesque" intimidation and ask that their names be listed on Campus Watch too. Subsequently, Campus Watch removed the list from its website.

=== Israel Victory Project ===
The Israel Victory Project, launched in 2017, is an initiative aimed at securing an end to the Israeli-Palestinian conflict by putting pressure on Palestinians to end anti-Israel terrorism and acknowledge Israel's legitimacy as a Jewish state, rather than through bilateral negotiations. Daniel Pipes has stated that "Peace is not made with enemies; peace is made with former enemies."

In March 2026, Dr. Martin Sherman, a participant in the Israel Victory Project, said it was unfeasible to de-radicalize Palestinians in the Gaza Strip and that the only solution would be for Israel to expel them.

== See also ==
- List of think tanks in the United States
