= Mansoor Alam =

Pakistani diplomat

Pakistan Ambassador to Mexico
- In office 1990

Pakistan Ambassador to the United Arab Emirates
- In office 1994

Pakistan Ambassador to Egypt
- In office 1997

Pakistan Ambassador to Russia and Finland
- In office April 1997 – 20 July 2000

Personal details
- Born: 14 April 1944
- Died: 16 October 2017 (aged 73)
- Profession: Diplomat; lawyer; humanitarian

Mansoor Alam (Urdu: منصور عالم; 14 April 1944 – 16 October 2017) was a Pakistani diplomat who served as his country's ambassador to four countries and as an accredited ambassador to fifteen countries.

== Background ==
Alam graduated from the University of Karachi, where he studied law and international relations. He later taught international relations at the Islamia College, before passing the Central Superior Services examination and joining the Foreign Service of Pakistan in 1966.

== Diplomatic career ==
Alam held several diplomatic posts from 1966 to 2000. During his career, he was posted to 11 different countries, including in four countries as Pakistan's ambassador while holding concurrent accreditation for up to 15 countries. He served as the head of mission in London from 1984 to 1986, and as director-general for the Middle East from 1986 to 1989.

In 1990, he was appointed as Pakistan's ambassador to Mexico, with concurrent accreditation to Nicaragua, Costa Rica, Panama, Cuba, El Salvador, Venezuela and Belize. He played a critical role in the trade agreements put in place and the development of bilateral relations between these nations and Pakistan. In 1994, he was ambassador to the United Arab Emirates. During his time in Abu Dhabi, he played a role in persuading prime minister Benazir Bhutto to make foreign visits to the UAE after she was elected prime minister for the second time. During 1997, he was posted as the Pakistani ambassador to Egypt.

Later from April 1997 to July 2000, Alam was the Pakistani envoy to Russia and Finland, and had an important role in arranging Pakistani prime minister Nawaz Sharif's two-day state visit to Russia, and in dealing with issues of nuclear capability. It was the first time in twenty-five years that a Pakistani leader had visited Russia. At that time, Sharif's visit to Moscow was considered the "single most important diplomatic event" in recent Pakistani-Russian relations for the previous fifty years. From 28 August 2000 to 30 June 2002, he was the director-general of the Foreign Service Academy in Islamabad.

== Humanitarian work ==
After retiring from diplomatic life, Alam set up an NGO where he provided free education and basic medical coverage to over 10,000 disenfranchised children in urban slums and rural areas in Pakistan, India and Nepal. His NGO was known as Friends of Literacy and Mass Education (FLAME), and was founded in 2001. It provides free primary level education to the poorest and underprivileged children of all ages in Pakistan and some in India with a vision to incorporate other SAARC nations.

Alam was also a founding member of the Karachi Council on Foreign Relations, Economic Affairs and Law, the Pak-India Citizens Friendship Forum and a board member of Tameer Microfinance Bank from 2007 to 2008.

== Works ==
Alam wrote articles on various subjects, which were published in major Pakistani dailies including Pakistan Today, Dawn and The Nation. His speeches and seminars include "Party Positions on Foreign Policy", "The Political Crises in Pakistan", "Seminar on WikiLeaks: If someone leaked ISI documents, he wouldn’t have survived", and "Future of American Foreign Policy".

== Death ==
Alam died in London, England, in October 2017 from a pulmonary cardiac arrest, while undergoing treatment there.
