= The Hidden Hand: Middle East Fears of Conspiracy =

1996 book by Daniel Pipes

- First edition
- Author: Daniel Pipes
- Language: English
- Genre: Non-fiction
- Publisher: St. Martin's Press
- Publication date: 1996

The Hidden Hand: Middle East Fears of Conspiracy is a 1996 book by Daniel Pipes published by St. Martin's Press.

According to a review in the Bulletin of the Middle East Studies Association of North America, Hidden Hand focuses on "grand conspiracies," alleged conspiracies that "seek to destroy religion, subvert society, change the political order, and undermine truth itself."

The book is organized in four sections. The first deals with nations (including Iran and Iraq) and leaders (ranging from Ayatollah Rouhalla Khomeini, to Gamal Abd al-Nasser, and Mohammad Reza Shah,) who exhibit a conspiracy mentality, or adopt one for political purposes. The second part deals with the two grand conspiracy theories about imperialist and Zionist domination that prevail across the Middle East. Third is an analysis of the goals and style of Middle Eastern conspiracy theories. And the fourth part of the book discusses explores the causes and origin of the region's ubiquitous predilection for conspiracy theories.

According to William B. Quandt, reviewing Hidden Hand in Foreign Affairs, Pipes points out that conspiracy theories rose to popularity in Middle Eastern politics only after the Middle East began its relative decline in power, and that, in fact, powerful countries form outside the region have in fact repeatedly undertaken covert operations in the Middle East in the 19th and 20th centuries. Quandt commented that "He also often writes as if repetition is all it takes to prove his point. But in some cases the authors cited at length sound as though they were paid hacks churning out propaganda that neither they nor their bosses believed. In other cases Pipes’ threshold for a conspiracy theory seems remarkably low."
