= American Outlook =

- Editor: Jay F. Hein
- Categories: current events
- Frequency: Biannual
- Founded: 1998
- Company: Sagamore Institute
- Country: United States
- Based in: Indianapolis, Indiana
- Language: English
- Website: www.americanoutlook.org
- ISSN: 1099-8896

American Outlook is an American quarterly public policy magazine that discusses the pressing issues of current events. The first issue of the magazine appeared in September 1998. Published by Sagamore Institute of Indianapolis, Indiana, American Outlook is available in hard copy and online.

Staff

- Jay F. Hein: editor in chief
- Wesley Cate: managing editor
- Beverly Saddler: production assistant
