= Mataparīkṣottara =

Sanskrit-language text by Harachandra Tarkapanchanan (1840)

- Author: Hara-chandra Tarakapanchanana
- Original title: मतपरीक्षोत्तरम्‌
- Language: Sanskrit
- Subject: Criticism of Christianity, Hindu apologetics
- Genre: non-fiction
- Publication date: 1840
- Publication place: British India

Mataparīkṣottara, also called Mataparīkṣottaram, is an 1840 Sanskrit-language text by Harachandra Tarkapanchanan (IAST: Hara-candra Tarka-pañcānana) of Calcutta, British India. It is a Hindu apologist response to the Christian writer John Muir's Mataparīkṣā.

== Authorship ==
The author, Harachandra, was a Bengali Brahmin from Calcutta. The text suggests that he was not a scholar, but knew a little about the Bible, the history of the Christian church, the Western freethought, and contemporary science.

== Contents ==
The Mataparīkṣottara consists of 137 verses in 18 pages, including a 2-page English-language preface. The Sanskrit text is divided into three untitled chapters. The text was printed in Bengali script, which limited its circulation outside Bengal.

The title of the text means "An Answer to the Mataparīkṣā" (Mata-parīkṣā-uttara) in Sanskrit. It bears the subtitle An Answer to a Sketch of the Argument for Christianity and against Hinduism.

In the short English-language introduction to his book, Harachandra displays a near-agnostic attitude, declaring that it impossible to prove a claimed revelation as true or false: the founder of a religion claims to have received the word of the god, the first believers trust him because they revere him, and each succeeding group of believers subscribe to the faith more blindly. As an example, he states that while he agrees that Muhammad claimed to be a prophet of god, he thinks that Muhammad was either "an imposter or insane", and a Muslim similarly doubts the Christian or Hindu faith.

In the Sanskrit text, Harachandra resorts to orthodox Hindu presuppositions. For example, according to him, the Bible is a relatively recent book, while the Hindu Vedas are "eternally preexistent" (sanātana). Based on this belief, he argues that "only that religion is true which has prevailed on earth since the time of creation, and not one that arose subsequently."

Compared to the other Hindu responses to Muir's work - Mata-parīkṣā-śikṣā and Śāstra-tattva-vinirṇaya - Harachandra's work was quite hostile towards Christianity, and lacked the persuasive power and the "finesse in interreligious dialogue". For example, he crudely scandalizes the story of the virgin birth of Jesus, stating that many priests had sex with Mary, resulting in her pregnancy, and these priests described the birth as a miracle to conceal their crime:

Thus, though a bastard, even the priests extolled him, and thinking 'I am a righteous-souled one,' he began to preach religion. Trusting his words, having scarcely considered anything, dull-witted people became his ardent servants. As the priests attributed miraculous activity [to him] in order to conceal their offense, so did they, too, become bereft of sense, deluded by their own magic. In the book, they made the fantastic proclamation that, 'This is God.' Thus was this religion propagated over the earth.

— Mataparīkṣottara

Harachandra derides the Christian missionaries, and insults Muir as "Hinduism's great foe", "blind", and "prejudiced". According to him, the Hindus who converted to Christianity did so because they desired the beautiful daughters of the Christian priests, liquor, meat, and profits.

He refers to Western freethinkers (such as David Hume, Thomas Paine, and Voltaire), stating that they proved the Christian priests wrong. The works of these freethinkers may be Harachandra's sources for criticism of Christianity. He points out several problems with Christianity, such as Biblical inconsistencies, unfulfilled prophecies, doubtful miracles, and the existence of denominations opposed to each other. He attributes the spread of Christianity to royal decrees since days of Constantine, instead of people's willingness to adopt it out of free will.

Some of Harachandra's arguments in defense of Hinduism are:

- Hindu scriptures recommend only the worship of Brahman, but Brahman is difficult to attain, so "fools" worship him in form of various deities and attain moksha only gradually.
- Various Hindu sects praise their own deities and criticize other deities in order to glorify their faith, but this is "not the highest form of activity."
- People are born into various varnas because of their past deeds (karma). A Brahmin is regarded as superior to a Shudra because the Brahmins adhere to righteous conduct (dharma), endure painful austerities, and control their senses. Brahmins devoid of such conduct are not respected in the scriptures or the world.
- Rituals such as purification of sins through bathing in the Ganges are meant for virtuous people who commit bad deeds accidentally. (Muir criticizes the belief that bathing in the Ganges cleanses one's sins, stating that it is "a cheap and easy form of grace".)
- The god exists for the devotee in the form that the devotee worships him, which explains the seemingly objectionable behavior (rasa lila) of Hindu deities such as Krishna. The gopis revered the god as a husband, so he fulfilled their desires in form of Krishna, but the god does not advise men to imitate such behavior.
- Multiple Hindu scriptures exist, because the sages wrote them to explain the meaning of the Vedas, which are difficult to understand.
- The Hindu belief that the soul (atman) is eternally existing (as opposed to being the god's creation) is correct. If the god created the souls (as Christians believe), why does one soul experience pleasure and another suffers pain?

In the concluding verse of his work, Harachandra vows to convert to Christianity if his objections were answered satisfactorily. He offered to engage in further dialogues with Muir only if Muir was willing to remunerate him and bear the printing costs.

== Reception ==
Conservative Hindus endorsed Harachandra as a defender of their faith. The work was translated into Bengali language, and appeared in serial form in the Calcutta newspaper Prabhakara, with recommendations from leading Hindu citizens.

On the other hand, the Calcutta Christian Observer (1841) criticized the text as a "silly book full of falsehood and bitter invectives", and declared that the job of Christian missionaries would be very easy if Hindu pandits were only as competent as Harachandra. Within a few months, Muir responded to Harachandra with a rebuttal in the Christian Intelligencer of Calcutta, titled "On the Arguments by which the Alleged Eternity of the Vedas May be Refuted". He also included some of these arguments in the 1840 edition of the Mataparīkṣā.

An unidentified British "gentleman" admonished Harachandra in three sermons delivered at the Christ Church in Cornwallis Square, Calcutta. Thomas Dealtry, the Anglican Archdeacon of Calcutta, selected K. M. Banerjea to officially respond to Harachandra's work. Banerjea, a Hindu convert to Christianity and a clergyman at the Christ Church, published a Bengali-language retort in 1841, titled Satyā Sthāpana o Mithyā Nāśana (English title: "Truth Defended, Error Exposed"). Banerjea accused Harachandra of not adhering to "the rules of common courtesy", and criticized his assertions as "glaringly incorrect, absurd, utterly subversive of all religion".
