= Mata-parīkṣā-śikṣā =

Sanskrit-language text by Subaji Bapu (1839)

Mataparīkṣāśikṣā
- Author: Somanātha (identified with Subaji Bapu)
- Original title: मत-परीक्षा-शिक्षा
- Language: Sanskrit
- Subject: Criticism of Christianity, Hindu apologetics
- Genre: non-fiction
- Publication date: 1839
- Publication place: British India

Mata-parīkṣā-śikṣā ("A Lesson for the [Author of the] Mataparīksā") is an 1839 Sanskrit-language text by Somanātha, apparently a pseudonym for Subaji Bapu of British India. It is a Hindu apologist response to the Christian writer John Muir's Mataparīkṣā.

== Authorship ==
The author of Mata-parīkṣā-śikṣā identifies himself as Somanātha. According to an anonymous English-language note on the manuscript of the text, the author was Subaji Bapu, a Marathi-speaking astrologer (jyotisha) of Central India, who enjoyed the patronage of the British civil servant and Orientalist Lancelot Wilkinson. James R. Ballantyne, who wrote the entry for the text in India Office Library and Records (IOLR)'s catalogue of Sanskrit manuscripts, disputes this information. However, several later writers such as Richard F. Young and Stephen Neill believe it to be true, based on a comparison of Mata-parīkṣā-śikṣā with Subaji's writings.

- Somanātha displays fascination with British technology and describes himself as "learned in scientific truths". This aligns well with the early career of Subaji, who gave up his belief in the Puranic cosmography in favour of the Copernican system. Fox notes that Subaji was a progressive and a religious liberal, whose "Westernized scientific perspective and broadminded tolerance" are similar to Somanātha's perspective.
- Both Somanātha and Subaji were aware of the contradictions between the mythological Puranic cosmography and the more scientific Siddhantic cosmography, but still respected the Puranas. The Mata-pariksha drew attention to Bhaskara II's description of the earth's shape in the Goladhyaya as opposed to the Puranic description of the earth as "lotus-shaped or resting on a turtle's back". In response, like Subaji, Somanātha defended the Puranas by explaining that the purpose of the religious texts is to magnify the glory of the god, sometimes at the expense of scientific accuracy: this does not make them defective.
- When Wilkinson published Vajra-suchi, a Buddhist text critical of the caste system, Subaji wrote a commentary titled Laghu-tamka (or Lughoo Tunk) defending the caste system. Both Laghu-tamka and Mata-parīkṣā-śikṣā defend the caste system, but are charitable towards the mlechchas. Subaji argued that the god was multi-faceted and appeared in different forms to different groups of people, including the mlechchas.
- Somanātha's Mata-parīkṣā-śikṣā and Subaji's Laghu-tamka were both published in 1839, although it is not clear which text was published first. Both texts feature nearly identical verses, highly detailed geographical locations of central India (e.g. Ajamtā or Ajamtāgrani in Sehore), and deference to Wilkinson.
- Both Laghu-tamka and Mata-parīkṣā-śikṣā discuss if Ravana - a rakshasa (demon) - should be called a Brahmin because he had studied the Vedas. Vajra-suchi, on which Subaji wrote a commentary, discusses this topic, which may have prompted Subaji to address it in both of his 1839 works.

According to Young, there is little doubt that Somanātha was a pseudonym of Subaji, but it is not clear why the author wrote under a pseudonym. Possibly, he did not want to appear too pro-Hindu to his European benefactors, or too mild towards Christianity to his fellow pandits.

== Contents ==
The Mata-parīkṣā-śikṣā is an apology for Hinduism and a critique of Christianity. As an example, Somanātha criticizes the Genesis narrative that describes the creation as merely 6,000 years old, finding the Hindu system of kalpas (aeons) superior.

Like the Mata-parīkṣā, the text is in the form of a dialogue between a student and a teacher. It comprises 107 verses, spanning seven folios, and is organized into 3 chapters:

1. A Brief Exposition of the Unity of Religions (Mataikya-saṃkṣepa)
2. The Teaching Establishing the Compatibility of All Religions (Sarva-matāvirodha-vyavasthāpanopadeśa)
3. An untitled chapter

Subaji's arguments include the following:

Criticism of Christianity

- The books of all faiths contain miraculous stories about various religious figures. If Jesus alone was greatest of all religious figures, as suggested by Muir, why was he killed by weak men?
- If the god destroyed the mankind's sin by sacrificing his own body (in form of Jesus), why can't the virtuous men do the same?
- Are Christians not sinners for harming creatures such as cows, who help humans by acts such as giving milk?

Defense of Hinduism

- Hindu texts celebrate only one god (Hari), who exists in form of various deities.
- People are born into different varnas because of their deeds (karma) in their past lives. A non-Brahmin cannot acquire the status of a Brahmin simply by performing the duties of a Brahmin, because the god did not make him a Brahmin in this particular birth.
- Just like a child learns about letters by means of metallic objects in shape of letters, people can learn about god through idol worship.
- The descriptions of erotic passions of the gods in the Hindu texts are figurative allusions aimed at teaching those who are attached to desire.

== Manuscripts ==
The text is known from only an India Office Library and Records (IOLR) manuscript, which contains many scribal errors.
