= Shad-darshana Darpana =

1860 Hindi-language book by Nehemiah Goreh

- Author: Nehemiah Goreh
- Original title: षड्दर्शन दर्पण
- Translator: Fitzedward Hall
- Language: Hindi
- Subject: Criticism of Hinduism
- Genre: non-fiction
- Publisher: Baptist Mission Press / Bishop's College Press
- Publication date: 1860
- Publication place: British India
- English publication date: 1862
- ISBN: 9781377003047 reprint
- OCLC: 11919856

Shad-darshana Darpana (IAST: Ṣaḍ-darśana-darpaṇa, English titles: Mirror of the Six Schools and A Rational Refutation of the Hindu Philosophical Systems) is an 1860 Hindi-language book written in Varanasi by Nehemiah Goreh, a Hindu convert to Christianity. It is a critique of the six orthodox schools of the Hindu philosophy.

== Background ==
The author Nehemiah Goreh, originally known as Nilakantha Gore, was a Hindu convert to Christianity. During 1844–1845, as a Hindu, he wrote the Sanskrit-language Hindu apologetic text Śāstra-tattva-vinirṇaya, which was critical of Christianity. In 1848, he converted to Christianity, and in 1860, wrote the Hindi-language Shad-darshana-darpana. The book was initially translated into English under the title Mirror of the Six Schools (a literal translation of the original title), but later the English title was changed to A Rational Refutation of the Hindu Philosophical Systems (1862).

Shad-darshana-darpana became Goreh's most influential work. Although its aim was to prove the superiority of Christianity over Hinduism, its English translation also served as the best introduction to the Hindu philosophy for English speakers for several decades, until Max Müller's Six Systems of Hindu Philosophy (1899).

In 1951, S.L. Katre prepared a critical edition of Goreh's earlier work Śāstra-tattva-vinirṇaya, intending to counteract the arguments outlined in the Shad-darshana-darpana.

== Content ==
Shad-darshana-darpana is a critique of the six orthodox schools of the Hindu philosophy. Goreh is critical of several aspects of the Hindu philosophy, but also acknowledges many agreements between the Christian and the Hindu beliefs. He believed that the god had been preparing the Hindus to receive the Christian revelation, because of which certain Hindu teachings enabled the Hindus to appreciate Christianity.

Goreh uses the work of the 16th-century scholar Vijnanabhiksu to argue against the Vedanta epistemology and metaphysics. He elaborates the concepts of subtle and causal bodies to present Vedanta as incoherent. For example, Goreh states that the Advaita tradition denies the reality of the creation while stating that the creation is one with Brahman, who is real. He describes the Hindu views on sin, the human condition, and salvation as irrational.

Goreh presents the Christian doctrine as a rational alternative to the Hindu doctrine.
