= Mataparīkṣā =

Sanskrit-language Chriatian Missionary text by John Muir (1839)

- Author: John Muir
- Original title: मत-परीक्षा
- Language: Sanskrit
- Subject: Criticism of Hinduism
- Genre: non-fiction
- Publication date: 1839
- Publication place: British India

Mata-parīkṣā is a Sanskrit-language text by the Christian author John Muir. It criticizes Hinduism, and argues that Christianity is the true faith. It was written in British India in 1839, and revised twice.

As suggested by the title Mata-parīkṣā (Sanskrit for "An Examination of Religions"), Muir portrayed himself as an impartial judge of religions. William Hodge Mill criticized the text for discussing the Christian philosophy in isolation instead of encouraging the readers to get baptized and join the Church.

== Contents ==
The book is written in form of a dialogue between a student and a teacher. The following is a synopsis of 1839 edition:

1. Description of God's Attributes (Īśvara-guṇa-varṇana)
  The student notes that various religions contradict each other, and therefore, not all of them can be true. The teacher explains that an intelligent person must analyze religions, accept the true one, and reject all others. He then describes the various attributes of the god.
2. The Necessity of Divine Guidance (Aiśanītyāvaśyakatā)
  The student asks if all believers conceive the God as omniscient, creator of everything etc. The teacher explains that many people follow religions that blaspheme God and worship other spirits, claiming that their scripture is divine.
3. Description of the Characteristics of the True Religion (Satya-dharma-lakṣaṇa-varṇana)
  The teacher describes the three characteristics of the true scriptures:
  1. The founder of the true religion must have performed miracles such as giving life to the dead, and such miracles should have been recorded beyond doubt.
  2. The true scripture must show excellence: the texts containing shameful stories are not divine.
  3. The true scripture must be universal: a scripture good for only a certain group of people is not divine.
4. Presentation of Christianity (Khṛṣtīya-mata-pradarśana)
  The teacher explains that only the scriptures of Christianity have the above-described characteristics, arguing that:
  1. The miracles of Jesus were recorded before many witnesses, and even his adversaries admitted them
  2. The commandments of Christianity are holy and pure
  3. Christianity is universal and does not benefit only people from certain castes
  During this explanation, the teacher discusses various Christian doctrines such as the necessity of Jesus' incarnation, the Holy Spirit and the Heaven.
5. Deliberation on the Indian Scriptures (Bhāratīya-śāstra-vicāra)
  The teacher then explains that the Indian scriptures do not show the three characteristics of the true scriptures, arguing that:
  1. Only the children and the fools, not intelligent people, believe in the miraculous stories about the daityas and the asuras. The origin of the Hindu texts such as the Vedas is obscure, as they were orally transmitted for a long period. Heroes such as Rama and Krishna were humans who have been glorified as divine figures by poets.
  2. The Hindu texts are full of contradictions, "shameful stories", and erroneous claims such as the description of the earth as "lotus-shaped or resting on a turtle's back". The rituals described in these texts do not make sense: for example, if one's sufferings are a result of sins, why does bathing in the Ganges cleanses one's sins but doesn't remove one's sufferings? Moreover, the Hindu scriptures are contradictory: if one follows the Vedas (which worship Indra and Agni), they must reject the Puranas (which worship Shiva and Vishnu) and the Vedanta (which worship the God as atman or spirit). The various philosophical systems - such as mimamsa, nyaya and sankhya - are mutually contradictory.
  3. The caste restrictions prescribed by the dharma-shastras deny the equality of men, thus proving that Hinduism is not universal.
  In conclusion, the teacher states that he derives "no satisfaction from refuting other religions". He praises the "good qualities" of the Hindus (such as their poetry and grammatical sciences), but states that their religion is not true.

== Hindu response ==
The text led to a controversy in British India, and Hindu pandits responded by writing apologist works critical of Muir's text:

- Mata-parīkṣā-śikṣā ("A Lesson for the [Author of the] Mataparīkṣā", 1839) by Somanātha, apparently a pseudonym for Subaji Bapu of Central India
- Mataparīkṣottara ("An Answer to the Mataparīkṣā", 1840) by Harachandra Tarkapanchanan of Calcutta
- Śāstra-tattva-vinirṇaya ("A Verdict on the Truth of the Shastra", 1844-1845) by Nilakantha Gore (or Goreh) of Benares

Muir responded to Harachandra with a rebuttal in the Christian Intelligencer of Calcutta, titled "On the Arguments by which the Alleged Eternity of the Vedas May be Refuted". He also included some of these arguments in the 1840 edition of the Mataparīkṣā.

Another Hindu pandit, whose name is unknown, wrote a Hindi-language critique of Muir's third edition of Matapariksha (1852-1854). This critique was published in Dharmādharma-parīkṣā-patra (1861), a Hindi-language collection of correspondence between an anonymous British Christian missionary and some Hindus on the relative merits of Hinduism and Christianity. The Hindu pandit, who was a Vaishnava and probably a Bengali, derided Muir as a pakhandi ("heretic" or "infidel" in this context), and quoted Brhan-naradiya-purana verses instructing the Vaishnavas to execute unbelievers and blasphemers.
