= Subaji Bapu =

Indian Astronomer and Astrologer (jyotisha)(19th-century)

- Other names: Soobajee Bapoo
- Occupation: Astrologer (jyotisha)
- Years active: 1824 to mid-1840s
- Era: British Raj
- Employer: Lancelot Wilkinson
- Known for: Hindu apologetics
- Notable work: Siddhānta-siromani-prakāsa (1836) and Avirodha-prakasha (1837), Laghu-tamka (1839), Mata-parīkṣā-śikṣā (1839)
- Opponent: John Muir

Subaji Bapu (IAST: Subājī Bāpū) was an early 19th-century Hindu astrologer (jyotisha) and astronomer from British India. Under the influence of the British civil servant Lancelot Wilkinson, he gave up his belief in Puranic cosmography in favour of the Copernican system. He argued that the Siddhantic cosmography of ancient Indian astrologers was more accurate than the Puranic cosmography, and wrote Siddhānta-siromani-prakāsa (1836) and Avirodha-prakasha (1837) to justify his views, amid opposition from the orthodox pandits.

Subaji was a Hindu apologist and defended the caste system in Laghu-tamka (1839). He is also identified with Somanātha, the author of Mata-parīkṣā-śikṣā, a Hindu response to the Christian writer John Muir's Mataparīkṣā.

== Career ==
=== Astrology and astronomy ===
Subaji Bapu was a Marathi-speaking astrologer (jyotisha) of Central India, and enjoyed the patronage of the British civil servant and Orientalist Lancelot Wilkinson.

Subaji's known career is closely linked with that of his patron Wilkinson, who described him as "a man of wonderful acuteness, and intelligence, and sound judgment". There are no records of Subaji before his association with Wilkinson. During the 1830s, when Wilkinson served as the East India Company's political agent in the Central Indian cities such as Bhopal and Sehore, Orientalist journals featured Subaji prominently. After Wilkinson's premature death in the mid-1840s, there are no records of Subaji.

Wilkinson took great interest in presenting a united view of the Hindu astronomy and the contemporary European astronomy. Intrigued by the ability of the generally "ignorant" contemporary Hindu astrologers to accurately predict eclipses, Wilkinson did some research, and attributed this accuracy to the Siddhanta literature of the ancient Hindu astronomers such as Aryabhata and Bhaskara II. According to him, the ancient Indian astronomers greatly admired "the learned men of the West" (the Yavanas), unlike the Puranas which denounced those foreigners as the lowest of the low. Wilkinson advocated bringing the writings of these ancient astronomers to the forefront, so that Hindu astrologers could become genuine astronomers, supported by their European instructors. His main aim was to spread an accurate understanding of physical science among the Indians; a secondary benefit of this would be to showcase the Puranic cosmography as inaccurate, thus leading to a decline in the prestige of the Brahmins and the popularity of Hinduism.

The first records of Subaji's interactions with Wilkinson are from 1824. It took Wilkinson eight years to convince Subaji of the inaccuracy of the Puranic cosmography. Subaji was finally convinced when Wilkinson proved to him that the ancient Indian astronomers were in agreement with European astronomers regarding the "size and shape of the earth and other important physical facts". According to Wilkinson, Subaji "lamented that his life had been spent in maintaining foolish fancies, and spoke with a bitter indignation against all those of his predecessors who had contributed to the willful concealment of the truths".

Initially, Subaji was reluctant to collaborate with Wilkinson, and the relationship made him an object of ridicule by his fellow pandits. However, by 1837, according to the Proceedings of the Asiatic Society, he had become a "zealous defender" of the Copernican system.

In 1836, Subaji published the Marathi-language text Siddhānta-śiromani-prakāśa (SSP), supporting the Copernican system. Subsequently, Omkara Bhatta translated it into Hindi as Bhūgolasāra. The pandits of Poona criticized Subaji's treatise, and Subaji published his defence in another text titled Avirodha-prakasha (1837).

Orientalists and EIC officials applauded Subaji, and in 1837, presented him a silver Hindi-language globe (earlier in 1834, he had requested a Hindi globe). According to an Asiatic Society meeting record, he was also given two silver inkstands "representing a jotishi pandit seated between two globes, expounding their use from the Siddhāntas — and around the stand, richly embossed, the twelve signs of the zodiac — a Sanskrit couplet on each expressing that it was presented by the Governor General in Council".

=== Hindu apologetics ===
Subaji was critical of several orthodox Hindu practices, such as the scriptural restrictions on travelling abroad, and the restrictions on widow remarriage. Nevertheless, he remained a Hindu, and defended his religion against Christianity. His patron Wilkinson was critical of the Hindu caste system, and decided to publish an edition of Vajra-sûcî, a Buddhist text critical of the caste system, attributed to Ashvaghosha. Subaji defended the caste system, and requested Wilkinson to include in the text his arguments in support of the caste system. Wilkinson's work was published with the title The Wujra Soochi: or Refulation [sic] of the Arguments upon which the Brahmanical Institution of Caste is Founded. It featured a commentary titled Lughoo Tunk (Laghu-tamka) by Subaji (credited as "Soobajee Bapoo").

An anonymous note on the manuscript of the Hindu apologetic text Mata-parīkṣā-śikṣā (1839), identifies its author as Subaji Bapu, although the text itself calls the author Somanātha. Written as a response to the Christian writer John Muir's Mataparīkṣā, the text offers an apology for Hinduism and criticizes Christianity (especially excessive evangelism), while advocating religious pluralism. Subaji apparently used the pseudonym Somanātha, possibly because he did not want to appear too pro-Hindu to his European benefactors, or too mild towards Christianity to his fellow pandits.

== Works ==
- Siddhānta-śiromani-prakāśa (1836), a Sanskrit work on astronomy, espousing the Copernican system
- Avirodha-prakāśa (1837), a work on astronomy, defending his earlier work against the criticism from orthodox pandits
- Laghu-taṃka (1839), a commentary on Vajra-suchi, defending the Hindu caste system
- Mata-parīkṣā-śikṣā (1839), a Hindu apologist response to the Christian writer John Muir's Mataparīkṣā
- Parasurāma-ksetrasthā, a Marathi-language text in which he criticized restrictions on widow remarriage
