= Catholic Answers =

American media ministry

- Abbreviation: CA
- Established: 1979; 47 years ago
- Founder: Karl Keating
- Type: 501(c)(3) organization
- Headquarters: El Cajon, California
- Website: catholic.com

Catholic Answers (CA) is an American Catholic media ministry and nonprofit organization based in El Cajon, California.

== History ==
Catholic Answers was founded in 1979 by Karl Keating in response to a fundamentalist Protestant church in San Diego that was distributing anti-Catholic propaganda in the form of comic tracts, called "Chick tracts", placed on the cars of Catholics attending Mass. He started by writing a modest tract titled "Catholic Answers" to counter the arguments he saw in the anti-Catholic tract. He distributed it on the windshields of the cars in the fundamentalist Protestant church's parking lot. Due to the feedback he received from that tract, he published 24 more tracts.

In 1988 Keating quit his law practice and turned Catholic Answers into a full-time apostolate, with an office and full-time staff. That same year, Keating published the book Catholicism and Fundamentalism, a compilation of apologetics newspaper articles that he had written during a 30-week stretch, which became a popular Catholic apologetics book.

In 1990 the original newsletter of Keating's organization was replaced with This Rock, a magazine and journal focused on Catholic apologetics and evangelization. Still in print after 30 years, the publication is now known as Catholic Answers Magazine.

The Catholic.com website received approximately 471,000 visitors per month in an October 2012 estimate.

== Staff ==
Apologists who have worked for Catholic Answers include Trent Horn, Tim Staples, and Jimmy Akin.

== See also ==
- Lighthouse Catholic Media
