= Svadesha-dharmabhimani =

- Author: Narayan Rao
- Original title: स्वदेश-धर्माभिमानी
- Language: Marathi
- Subject: Criticism of Christianity, Hindu apologetics
- Genre: non-fiction
- Publication date: 1834
- Publication place: British India

Svadesha-dharmabhimani (IAST: Svadeśadharmābhimānī) (Note: English title A Reply to the Rev. Mr. Wilson's Exposure of Hinduism) is an 1834 Marathi-language Hindu apologetic text by Narayan Rao (IAST: Nārāyana Rāo) of Satara, British India.

== Background ==
In 1831, Hindu pandit Morobhatt Dandekar and Christian missionary John Wilson debated in Bombay, each aiming to defend his religion. Dandekar summarized his arguments in the Marathi-language text Shri-hindu-dharma-sthapana, to which Wilson responded with An Exposure of the Hindu Religion.

Narayana Rao was an English-language instructor at a college founded by the ruler of Satara. He wrote the Marathi-language Svadesha-dharmabhimani (IAST: Svadeśa-dharmābhimānī, "One Who Takes Pride in His Country's Religion") as a response to criticism of Hinduism by Christian missionaries, particularly Wilson. Rao combined rationalism and traditional Hindu thinking in an attempt to prove that the Christian Bible is logically inconsistent.

Rao's work was edited by Dandekar, and Wilson repsonded to it with A Second Exposure of the Hindoo Religion (1834). A partial translation of Rao's text appears in Wilson's work.

== Contents ==
Rao's work expounds Vedanta and critically examines the Bible. Some of his arguments against Christianity include:

- The Biblical God must be lazy, as the Bible states that he rested after creating the Universe.
- Why did the God not think of creating a woman when he created Adam, and "stole" Adam's rib by "deceiving" him, to create Eve?
- The fable of the tree of the knowledge of good and evil is "inconsistent with the omnipotence and omniscience of God". Why did a serpent capable of breaking his commandment of not eating from the tree of knowledge exist? Why did he curse Adam, Eve, and serpent instead of preventing them from breaking his commandment in the first place? Such a god seems "unjust, and vainly troublesome".
- Why did the God commit the "sin" of impregnating Mary, the wife of a righteous man, instead of his own wife?
- The appearance of an incarnation of god should promote happiness. However, the appearance of Jesus resulted in the killing of a large number of infants: it appears that Herod was more powerful than Jesus. How can such a powerless man be considered the son of God or have any relation to the God?
- A star appeared to the Magi seeking to find Jesus. However, if a new star really came near the earth, it would consume the earth, and cause great calamity.
- According to the Christians, Jesus ascended to the heaven with his body, but this is "impossible on account of the attraction of the earth.
- If the "Christian shastra" were true, the God should have sent the Christian teachers to all parts of the world during the lifetime of Jesus. Instead, the Christian missionaries have come to India in large numbers 1800 years later, and during this time, according to Christian logic, millions of people would have gone to hell for not practising Christianity. The logical conclusion is that the Christian religion is false, and the Christian missionaries have come to India to practise "deciet", taking advantage of the colonial rule in India.
