= Nehemiah Goreh =

Nehemiah Goreh (born Nilakantha Gore; 1825—1895) was a Hindu convert to Christianity in British India. As a Hindu apologist, he wrote the Sanskrit-language text Śāstra-tattva-vinirṇaya and a Hindi-language synopsis of it, defending Hinduism against Christian missionaries. Later, he converted to Christianity, and wrote texts critical of Hinduism, including Shad-darshana Darpana.

== Early life ==
Nilakantha Gore (or Goreh) was born in a Marathi-speaking Chitpavan Brahmin family in 1825, in the Kashipura village of Deccan region. His ancestors were hereditary counselors to the ruler of Bundelkhand. His uncle served as an advisor to the Maratha vassal Nawab Ali Bahadur of Banda. The family later retired from public service, and settled in the Maratha enclave in the Assi Ghat area of Benares (Varanasi). At Benares, the family maintained Anna-purna-chattar, a charitable institution for pilgrims.

Goreh's family did not let him attend the Benares Sanskrit College, concerned that the European learning there would make him lose respect for the Hindu shastras. Instead, he was privately tutored in grammar and the Hindu philosophy (darshanas).

Although he came from a Shaivite family, he adopted Vishnu as his ishta devata (favourite deity). In a letter to Monier Monier-Williams, he states that he did so because the "more venerable and more ancient authorities of the Hindu religion" (such as the Adi Shankara) were Vishnu worshippers.

== As a Hindu apologist ==
Goreh was a devout Hindu, and the public preaching by Christian missionaries in Benares and their apparent success greatly outraged and distressed him. In April 1844, he met William Smith of the Church Missionary Society and asked a few questions on the nature of Christianity. Smith presented him with a copy of John Muir's Mataparīkṣā, which criticized Hinduism and portrayed Christianity as the true faith. The next day, Goreh wrote a Hindi-language letter to Smith, detailing his objections to the Christian doctrine, specifically the one dealing with the problem of evil.

Sometime between April 1844 and April 1845, Goreh composed the Sanskrit-language Śāstra-tattva-vinirṇaya (dated to year 1766 of the Shalivahana era). He sent a copy of the text to Muir.

Goreh also wrote a Hindi-language text titled Doubts Concerning Christianity, a synopsis of arguments elaborated in the Śāstra-tattva-vinirṇaya. He circulated it through Benares, aiming to stop the conversions to Christianity. He met Smith again in April 1845, and presented him a manuscript of this text. Smith later translated this document into English. The doubts raised by Goreh in the text include:

1. Christian missionaries claim that only those who believe in Jesus can be saved. Then why did the God create so many nations who have never heard of Jesus, thus condemning several generations of people to hell?
2. If the God is just, loving and merciful, why did Jesus suffer, and why is he needed as a mediator between the God and the believers?
3. The stories of miracles performed by Jesus and his Apostles are doubtful, since such stories are found in all cultures, and learned men don't believe in them. The Christians don't believe the Hindu stories about miracles, so why should the Hindus believe the Christian ones?
4. Why did the God create souls who he knows will eventually be miserable in hell forever?
5. Hindus meditate upon idols to remember God, just as Christians do it with the Bible. Then why do Christian missionaries condemn idolatry?
6. According to Hindu belief, a person's sufferings are the result of sins in their past births: they have an opportunity to correct themselves. According to Christian belief, the sinful are condemned to eternal hell when they die: this punishment is useless, since they are not born again, and portrays the god as cruel and injust. Why does Christianity deny transmigration of souls?

== Conversion to Christianity ==
Sometime later, Goreh faced a spiritual crisis, and wrote to John Muir's unnamed pandit in Azamgarh expressing his doubts about Hinduism. Muir and Goreh met several times, and Muir gave Goreh a copy of his Sanskrit-language Glory of Jesus Christ (1848). Goreh ultimately converted to Christianity, and was baptized with the name Nehemiah in March 1848.

Goreh's family ostracized him, and his young wife Lakshmibai was sent back to her father. Goreh got her back with the help of the local British magistrate, and she converted to Christianity. She had been sick for a long time, and died two days after her baptism. S.L. Katre, who published the first printed edition of Śāstra-tattva-vinirṇaya states that she died of shock because she was converted against her will; Katre makes no mention of her illness. The Christian missionary writers state that she was "blessed" to have died after her baptism. Later, Goreh's widowed father also converted to Christianity. His younger brother was not allowed to meet him for four years, but later the two brothers shared a close relationship, although the brother remained a Hindu pandit despite Goreh's attempts to convert him.

Goreh became involved in missionary activities such as preaching to Hindus, writing texts on Christianity for them, and lecturing to fellow Brahmins and members of the Brahmo Samaj. He became a tutor to the Sikh Maharaja Duleep Singh, another convert to Christianity, and accompanied him to England, where he met Queen Victoria. He kept in touch with Muir, who introduced him to Orientalist Max Muller during his first visit to England.

In 1860, Goreh published Shad-darshana Darpana, a work critical of Hinduism. As an Anglican, he also wrote against Roman Catholicism. He was ordained as a deacon in 1868, and as a priest in 1870. He joined the Society of St John the Evangelist, and spent his last years in the Society's house in Poona (Pune). He died on 29 October 1895. His daughter Ellen Lakshmi Goreh was also a Christian missionary.

William Smith wrote his biography, titled Dwij: The conversion of a brahman to the faith of Christ (1850). Charles Edwyn Gardner wrote another biography titled Life of Father Goreh (1900).

== Works ==
As Nilakantha Gore:

- Śāstra-tattva-vinirṇaya (1844-1845), a Sanskrit-language Hindu apologist work which serves as a systematic counterpoint to his post-conversion writings.
- Doubts Concerning Christianity (1844-1845), a Hindi-language Hindu apologist work which summarizes the arguments elaborated in the Śāstra-tattva-vinirṇaya.

As Neremiah Goreh, after conversion to Christianity:

- Shad-darshana Darpana: Hindu philosophy examined by a Benares pandit (1860), a Hindi-language critique of Hinduism; also published as A Rational Refutation of the Hindu Philosophical Systems (1862)
- Do I honestly believe in the doctrines of the Church of England which I have solemnly professed to believe by subscribing to her prayer book and articles? (1844)
- Vedantmat ka bichar aur khristiyamat ka sar (1853, "Vedantism and the essence of Christianity"), a Hindi-language work
- Theism and Christianity (1882), reprinted as The Existence of Brahmoism itself a Proof of the Divine Origin of Christianity (1889)

Extracts of his writings were published in the Indian Church Quarterly Review.
