= Ellen Lakshmi Goreh =

Indian poet (1853-1937)

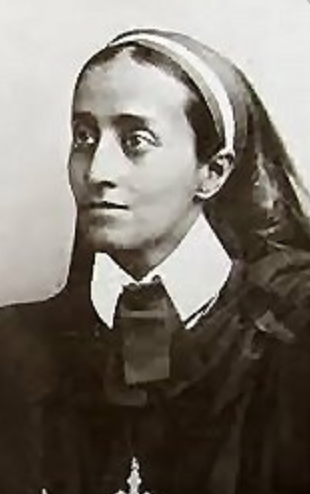
- Ellen Lakshmi Goreh, from an undated photograph
- Born: 11 September 1853; Varanasi (Benares), Uttar Pradesh
- Died: 1937 (aged 83–84); Kanpur (Cawnpore), Uttar Pradesh
- Occupation(s): Poet, missionary, nurse, deaconess

'In His Presence'
MIDI version of 1902 setting by Ernest Edwin Mitchell

Ellen Lakshmi Goreh (11 September 1853 – 1937) was an Indian poet, Christian missionary, deaconess, and nurse.

== Early life ==
Ellen Lakshmi Goreh was born in Varanasi, the daughter of Nilakantha (Nehemiah) Goreh and Lakshmibai Jongalekar. Her father was a Brahmin who converted to Christianity, and an ordained minister. Her mother died in 1853, and the infant Ellen was raised by white Westerners, including indigo planters named Smailes, and then by missionaries, Rev. and Mrs. W. T. Storrs, who called her "Nellie". She was educated in England from ages 12 to 27, including at Home and Colonial College in London.

== Career ==
Encouraged by English evangelist Frances Ridley Havergal, Goreh returned to India as a missionary in 1880. Her first published collection, From India's Coral Strand (1883), features poetry with Christian missionary themes, informed by Goreh's experience as an Indian woman among Westerners. For example, "Who Will Go For Us?", in which she implores white Christian women to listen to the real concerns of their oppressed sisters over exotic fictional accounts: "This is no romantic story / Not an idle, empty tale / Not a vain farfetched ideal / No, your sisters' woes are real / Let their pleading tones prevail..." One of her poems became the widely-known hymn "In the Secret of His Presence", with music by American composer George Coles Stebbins; her lyrics explore themes of safety and refuge.

Goreh taught at a girls' school in Amritsar. She trained as a nurse at Allahabad, and became superintendent of the Bishop Johnson Orphanage from 1892 to 1900. She was ordained as a deaconess in 1897. Goreh's second collection of poems, titled simply Poems (1899), was published in Madras, and reflects "her radically transformed understandings" and "her intricate, multi-faceted identity" as an Indian Christian woman and a transracial adoptee. She wrote a pamphlet, "Evangelistic Work Among Women" (1908). In 1932 she retired from mission work.

== Hymns by Goreh ==
- "The Great Refiner"
- "No Disappointment Yonder" (also titled "Over Yonder")
- "Lo, the Darkness Gathers Round Us" (also titled "Beacon-Light")
- "In the Secret of his Presence" The lyrics were treated to a musical setting by Australian composer Ernest Edwin Mitchell

== Personal life ==
Goreh died in 1937, in her eighties, at St. Catherine's Hospital in Kanpur.
