= Jimmy Akin =

American Catholic apologist

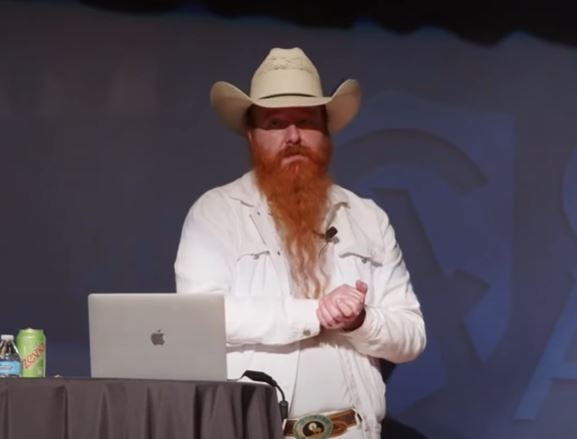
- Akin providing a rebuttal during his 2022 debate with Bart Ehrman.
- Born: August 24, 1965 (age 61); Corpus Christi, Texas, U.S.

YouTube information
- Channel: Jimmy Akin
- Years active: 2009–present
- Subscribers: 127,000
- Views: 16.9 million
- Last updated: October 4, 2026

Jimmy Akin (born August 24, 1965) is an American Catholic apologist. He has been working for Catholic Answers since 1993 and is their longest-serving staff member.

Akin is a weekly guest on the national radio program Catholic Answers Live, and regular contributor to Catholic Answers Magazine. Since 2018, Akin has been the co-host of Jimmy Akin's Mysterious World, a podcast examining mysteries in the areas of the paranormal and true crime.

== Biography ==
Jimmy Akin was born on August 24, 1965, in Corpus Christi, Texas. He grew up nominally Protestant in Fayetteville, Arkansas. As a child, he attended services at the local Church of Christ with his parents but became interested in the New Age movement as a teenager. During his time in college, Akin encountered the preaching of the televangelist Eugene "Gene" Scott and became a Christian, finding a denominational home in the Presbyterian Church in America, and wanted to be a pastor or seminary professor. He also worked as a Pro-Life activist prior to working for Catholic Answers.

Soon after becoming a Christian, Akin met his future wife, Renee Humphrey, who had been baptized a Catholic but held many New Age beliefs. Over the course of their relationship, Humphrey reverted to Catholicism and resumed practicing the faith. They were married in 1988; later that year, Humphrey died of colon cancer.

=== Career ===
He is the senior apologist for Catholic Answers. While his academic training is in philosophy, he also claims to be an autodidact, who has managed to acquire an extensive background in apologetics, biblical studies, theology, liturgy, canon law, and related disciplines.

Akin is a weekly guest on the national radio program Catholic Answers Live, a regular contributor to Catholic Answers Magazine, and a blogger and podcaster. His personal web site is JimmyAkin.com.

In 2010, he defended charges that Pope John Paul II engaged in self-flagellation, writing, "Self-mortification teaches humility by making us recognize that there are things more important than our own pleasure." In 2020, Akin said that while Chick tracts were inaccurate, he thought they brought some people to God.

Since 2018, Akin has been the co-host (alongside Dom Bettinelli) of Jimmy Akin's Mysterious World, a podcast examining mysteries in the areas of the paranormal and true crime.

== Works ==
- "A Triumph and a Tragedy" in Surprised By Truth: 11 Converts Give the Biblical and Historical Reasons for Becoming Catholic (Basilica Press, 1994, ISBN 978-0964261082)
- The Salvation Controversy (Catholic Answers Press, 2001, ISBN 978-1888992182)
- The Nightmare World of Jack Chick (Catholic Answers Press, 2008, ISBN 978-1933919171)
- The Fathers Know Best: Your Essential Guide to Early Christian Teaching (Catholic Answers Press, 2010, ISBN 978-1933919348)
- "Anti-Catholicism" in Disorientation: How to Go to College Without Losing Your Mind (Ascension Press, 2010, ISBN 978-1934217948)
- Mass Revision: How the Liturgy Is Changing and What It Means for You (Ignatius Press, 2011, ISBN 978-1933919454)
- Mass Appeal: The ABCs of Worship (Catholic Answers Press, 2012, ISBN 978-1888992328)
- The Drama of Salvation: How God Rescues You from Your Sins and Delivers You to Eternal Life (Catholic Answers Press, 2015, ISBN 978-1941663127)
- A Daily Defense: 365 Days (plus one) to Becoming a Better Apologist (Catholic Answers Press, 2016, ISBN 978-1683570042)
- Teaching with Authority: How to Cut Through Doctrinal Confusion & Understand What the Church Really Says (Catholic Answers Press, 2018, ISBN 978-1683570943)
- The Bible Is A Catholic Book (Catholic Answers Press, 2019, ISBN 978-1683571414)
