= Śāstra-tattva-vinirṇaya =

- Original title: शास्त्र-तत्त्व-विनिर्णय
- Language: Sanskrit
- Subject: Criticism of Christianity, Hindu apologetics
- Genre: non-fiction
- Publication date: 1844–1845
- Publication place: British India

Śāstra-tattva-vinirṇaya, also transliterated as Shastra-tattva-vinirnaya ("A Verdict on the Truth of the Shastra"), is a Sanskrit-language text written by Nilakantha Gore (or Goreh, later Neremiah Goreh) during 1844–1845 in Benares, British India. It is a Hindu apologist response to the Christian writer John Muir's Mataparīkṣā.

== Authorship ==
Nilakantha Gore, a Marathi-speaking Chitpavan Brahmin wrote the text at Benares during 1844-1845, at the age of 19. Around four years later, he converted to Christianity, and was baptized with the name Nehemiah.

== Contents ==
The text comprises 784 anuṣṭubh verses in 6 chapters:

1. Repudiation of the Opponent's Way of Examining the Authoritativeness of Religion (Parokta-mata-prāmāṇya-parīkṣā-prakāra-nirākaraṇaṃ), 28 verses
2. Investigation of Faults in the Opponent's Religion (Para-mata-dūṣaṇa-nirūpaṇaṃ), 71 verses
3. Beneficial Instruction (Hitopadeśa), 71 verses
4. Investigation of the Instability of Argumentation in the Previous Narratives and the Necessity of Faith in the Scriptures (Śāstra-śraddhāvaśyakatā-kathana-pūrvaka-tarkāpratiṣṭhāna-nirūpaṇaṃ), 59 verses
5. Investigation into the Scriptures' Self-Validity, which is Independent of Reason (Śāstrasyopapatti-nirapekṣa-svataḥ-prāmāṇya-nirūpaṇaṃ), 202 verses
6. Repudiation of Suspicions About Defects in Our Religion (Sva-mata-doṣa-śaṅkā-nirākaraṇaṃ), 186 verses

The following sections list Nilakantha's arguments.

=== Criticism of Christianity ===
- Why should one believe that the stories of the miracles of Jesus are true and substantiated by the accounts of Christianity's adversaries, as claimed by Muir? If the Bible is the source for such claims, why should one trust the Bible as divine and authoritative? If Jesus really restored eyesight to the blind, why do blind people who revere him today remain blind? Is the god no longer compassionate, or no longer willing to act in a way that will make people have confidence in him?
- According to the Christian belief, the god created souls (as opposed to the Hindu belief that the atman is eternally existing). Did the god create souls for his entertainment, because he was alone and sad? If he wants the souls to go to heaven, why did he give them the ability to commit sin, let some of them die as children, or make children who are retarded? Is he not compassionate? If he created humans because he needed them to worship him, he must not be self-sufficient.
- According to the Hindu belief, the souls suffer pain and pleasure over several lives, in accordance with their deeds: the sinful suffer only for a limited time, and get a chance to attain salvation in their subsequent lives. According to the Christian belief, the sinful are condemned to eternal hell. Why did the god create souls that do not know about the Christian scripture, and therefore, are condemned to the eternal hell?
- Regarding the concept of original sin, how can the god be called just, if he gave the man ability to break his commands, and then punished him for doing so, and if he punishes one person for the sin of another?
- Is it not unjust that Jesus makes sinful men pure (shuddha) out of mercy? If men can destroy their sins simply by trusting in Jesus, wouldn't they commit sins at whim?
- Why do people who trust in Jesus experience suffering? How can they be sure they won't suffer in the afterlife? The argument that the god makes them suffer to test their nature does not make sense, as an omniscient god must already know about the nature of his creation. Why does the God make children suffer and die before they reach the age of accountability?
- Animals are like humans in many ways; for example, they are creatures of god, and have families. Why is the god not compassionate towards them and does not provide them with a way to salvation?

=== Defense of Hinduism ===
- The rituals prescribed in the Hindu scriptures are for the worship of one god (Bhagavan). However, the god gives the fruit of various deeds to the doers through various deities, just as a king does through various servants.
- All of god's actions are aimed at ensuring that the souls (jivas) obtain the fruit of their deeds (karman). The conflict between Hindu deities (referred to in the Mata-pariksha) also happen for this reason. These deities have just one soul (atman), but they seem distinct to different people because those people have different viewpoints.
- The various Hindu philosophies (darshanas) seem contradictory, just like a man asking for directions may get seemingly contradictory answers (such as "Go east" or "Go west") to reach a destination depending on his location. However, all of them provide the same result: leading one to salvation.
- All living beings experience prosperity or pain because of deeds in their past lives. This also explains why certain people are born into the privileged Brahmin class. God created Brahmins to perform ritual activity which "gives rise to purity of mind".
- Idol worship involves focusing mind on the god, not on the material of the idol. Similarly, repeatedly chanting the names of the god (Bhagavan) focuses one mind on the god. There is no harm in practising such rituals.
- Those who compare the rasa lila of Krishna to sinful activities such as adultery are not intelligent enough to understand it. The god, in form of Krishna, showed favour to the gopis who rejected attachment to all objects and desired only him.
- The Hindu scriptures are "deeply profound" unlike the Christian scripture which can be understood easily even by stupid people, and therefore, cannot be of divine origin.
- Multiple Hindu scriptures exist for the welfare of people of different aptitudes.
- The aim of the Puranic cosmography is to glorify the god, so it should not be taken literally and criticized for scientific inaccuracies. Even in Christianity, there is a conflict between religion and science.
- Spiritual faith (shraddha) allows one to see realities beyond what can be perceived with senses and logic. Reason (tarka or upapatti) is subservient to faith: it should be used for understanding the scriptures, but not for contradicting them. A person requires faith to appreciate the content of the scriptures, and a person obsessed with objective verification of their content will become cynical like the Charvakas. Goreh argues that even Christians require faith, rather than logic, to believe stories such as that of a conversation between a snake and Eve.

== Critical edition ==
S.L. Katre prepared a critical edition of the text, based on two fragmentary manuscripts and a complete manuscript owned by Bhau-saheb Katre of Varanasi. It was published by the Scindia Oriental Institute of Ujjain in 1951. With help of this critical edition, S.L. Katre intended to counteract Goreh's post-conversion critique of Hinduism - Shad-darshana Darpana.
