= Tim Staples =

American Catholic apologist (born 1964)

- Born: July 11, 1964 (age 62); Virginia, U.S.
- Education: Jimmy Swaggart Bible College; St. Charles Borromeo Seminary; Mount St. Mary’s Seminary
- Occupations: Author, Apologist, Speaker
- Military Career
- Allegiance: United States
- Branch: U.S. Marine Corps
- Website: http://www.timstaples.com

Tim Staples (born July 11, 1964) is a Catholic author, apologist, and lecturer. Until July 2026, he was the Director of Apologetics and Evangelization at Catholic Answers.

== Personal life ==
In Surprised by Truth in a chapter entitled "The Bible Made Me Do It", Staples describes his early role models:

From the time I was ten years old, I wanted to be a preacher like Billy Graham and my Baptist pastor. I dreamed of preaching in the pulpit on Sunday morning and leading people to Jesus Christ. Other kids wanted to be firemen and policemen; I wanted to be a preacher.

Staples joined the Marine Corps and served a four-year tour of duty. During his time in the Corps, he became involved with the Assemblies of God ministry, including participation in "street evangelization and leading Bible studies, young Christian singles groups and a detention center outreach."

During his final year in the Corps, Staples was challenged by Matt Dula, a fellow Marine and "Catholic who really knew his faith", to study Catholicism from Catholic and historical sources:

When I first met Matt and we started talking about religion, I assumed he would be another poor Catholic that I could help get "saved the Bible way." I was in for quite a surprise. I started an argument that lasted my entire final year in the Marine Corps. In spite of the jousting, we became good friends. But when it came to religion, Christian charity would often go out the window. I thank God that Matt had enough knowledge of and love for his faith to give me intelligent answers about Catholicism. If it were not for him, I would not be Catholic today. I pray that my testimony will encourage Catholics to defend the faith when challenged by non-Catholics. I thank God for letting me encounter a Catholic who was willing and able to contend for the faith (Jude 13).

Following his military service, Staples enrolled in Jimmy Swaggart Bible College in Baton Rouge, Louisiana for the purpose, according to Staples, of proving Catholicism wrong. Nevertheless, Staples describes this time as leading to his conversion to Catholicism.

In 1988, Staples converted to Catholicism and spent the next six years in seminary, preparing to enter the priesthood. During this time, Staples attained a degree in philosophy from St. Charles Borromeo Seminary in Overbrook, Pennsylvania, and studied theology at the post-graduate level at Mount St. Mary’s Seminary in Emmitsburg, Maryland. Staples left seminary in 1994.

Staples' wife Valerie is a Director of Marketing with Pre‐Paid Legal Services and the Director of the Maria Goretti Girls, a Catholic teen group in the Diocese of San Diego.

== Career ==
For over twenty-five years, Staples has served as a Catholic apologist, stating there is a "growing crucial need" for apologetics among Catholics.

Staples has served as the Director of Apologetics and Evangelization at Catholic Answers. He is a regular guest on the Catholic Answers Live radio show. Staples speaks at dozens of Catholic conferences and events every year.

One of Staples' apologetics specialties is answering objections to the Catholic Church's teaching on the Virgin Mary. Staples published Behold Your Mother: A Biblical and Historical Defense of the Marian Doctrines in 2014 in Twenty Answers: Mary in 2016.

== Books ==
- Nuts & Bolts: A Practical Guide for Explaining and Defending the Catholic Faith
- Behold Your Mother: A Biblical and Historical Defense of the Marian Doctrines
