= Shudra =

One of four varnas (classes) in Hinduism

Shudra or Shoodra (Sanskrit: Śūdra) is one of the four varnas of the Hindu class and social system in ancient India. Some sources translate it into English as a caste, or as a social class. Theoretically, Shudras constituted a class like workers.

According to Richard Gombrich's study of Buddhist texts, particularly relating to castes in Sri Lankan Buddhist and Tamil Hindu society,

The terms Vaisya and Sudra did not correspond to any clear-cut social units, even in the ancient period, but various groups were subsumed under each term [...]; In medieval times (say AD 500–1500) though society was still said to consist of the four classes, this classification seems to have become irrelevant[.]

The word Shudra appears in the Rigveda and it is found in other Hindu texts such as the Manusmriti, Arthashastra, dharmaśāstras and jyotiḥśāstras. In some cases, Shudras participated in the coronation of kings, or were amatya "ministers" and rajas "kings" according to early Indian texts.

== History ==
=== Vedas ===
The term śūdra appears only once in the Rigveda. This mention is found in the mythical story of creation embodied in the Puruṣasuktam. It describes the formation of the four varnas from the body of a primeval man. It states that the brahmin emerged from his mouth, the kshatriya from his arms, the vaishya from his thighs and the shudra from his feet. According to historian Ram Sharan Sharma, the purpose of this verse may have been to show that shudras had the same lineage as the other varnas and hence were a section of society in the Vedic period. On the other hand, it could also represent an attempt to provide a common mythical origin for the heterogenous Brahminical society.

While the Rigveda was most likely compiled between c. 1500 BCE and 1200 BCE, John Muir in 1868 suggested that the verse that mentions the four varnas has "every character of modernness both in its diction and ideas". The Purusha Sukta verse is now generally considered to have been inserted at a later date into the Vedic text, possibly as a charter myth.

According to Stephanie W. Jamison and Joel Brereton, "there is no evidence in the Rigveda for an elaborate, much-subdivided and overarching caste system", and "the varna system seems to be embryonic in the Rigveda and, both then and later, a social ideal rather than a social reality". Historian Ram Sharan Sharma states that "the Rig Vedic society was neither organized on the basis of social division of labour nor on that of differences in wealth... [it] was primarily organised based on kin, tribe and lineage."

According to Sharma, nowhere in the Ṛgveda or Atharvaveda "is there any evidence of restrictions regarding food and marriage either between the Dasa and Aryan, or between the Shudra and the higher varnas". Further, adds Sharma, in late Atharva Veda, "Shudra does not come in for notice, probably because his varna did not exist at that stage".

According to Romila Thapar, the Vedic text's mention of Shudra and other varnas has been seen as its origin, and that "in the varna ordering of society, notions of purity and pollution were central and activities were worked out in this context" and it is "formulaic and orderly, dividing society into four groups arranged in a hierarchy". According to Sharma, the Shudra class originated from Indo-Aryans and non-Indo-Aryans who were relegated to that position due "partly through external and partly through internal conflicts".

The word pusan appears in a Vedic-era upanishad meaning "nourisher" and associates it with the creation of earth and production activities that nourishes the whole world, and the text calls this Pusan as Shudra. The term Pusan, in Hindu mythology, is the charioteer of the sun who knows the paths thereby bringing light, knowledge and life to all. The same word pusan is, however, associated in a Brahmana text to Vaishya.

=== Arthashastra ===
The ancient Hindu text Arthashastra states, according to Sharma, that Aryas were free men and could not be subject to slavery under any circumstances. The text contrasts Aryas with Shudra, but neither as a hereditary slave nor as an economically closed social stratum in a manner that the term Shudra later was interpreted. According to Rangarajan, the law on labour and employment in Arthashastra has led to a variety of different interpretations by different translators and commentators, and "the accepted view is that slavery, in the form it was practised in contemporary Greece, did not exist in Kautilyan India".

Kautilya argued for the rights of Shudras and all classes to participate as warriors. Roger Borsche says that this is so because it is in the self-interest of the ruler to "have a people's army fiercely loyal to him precisely because the people had been treated justly".

=== Manusmriti ===
The Manusmriti predominantly discusses the code of conduct (dharma rules) for the Brahmins (priestly class) and the Kshatriyas (king, administration and warrior class). The text mentions Shudras and Vaishyas, but this part is its shortest section. Sections–of the Manusmriti state eight rules for Vaishyas and two for Shudras.

According to Indologist Patrick Olivelle, the Manusmriti says Brahmins may seize property from Shudras (because Shudras own nothing) and that Shudras should not accumulate wealth as if they become wealthy they could gain undue power.

In sections 10.43 - 10.44, Manu lists Kshatriya tribes who, neglecting the priests and their rites, had fallen to the status of Shudras. These are: Pundrakas, Codas, Dravidas, Kambojas, Yavanas, Sakas, Paradas, Pahlavas, Chinas, Kiratas, Daradas and Khasas.

=== Yajnavalkya smriti and Grhyasutras ===
According to Laurie Patton, a professor of religion specialising in early Indian religions, the rights and status of Shudra vary widely across early Indian texts. The Apastamba Grhysutra excludes the Shudra students from hearing or learning the Vedas. Yajnavalkya Smriti in contrast, mentions Shudra students, and the Mahabharata states that all four varnas, including the Shudras, may hear the Vedas. Other Hindu texts go further and state that the three varnas – Brahmin, Kshatriya, Vaishya – may acquire knowledge from Shudra teachers, and the yajna sacrifices may be performed by Shudras. These rights and social mobility for Shudras may have arisen in times of lower societal stress and greater economic prosperity, periods that also saw improvement in the social conditions of women.

=== Medieval Upanishads ===
Medieval era texts such as Vajrasuchi Upanishad discuss varna and include the term Shudra. According to Ashwani Peetush, a professor of philosophy at the Wilfrid Laurier University, the Vajrasuchi Upanishad is a significant text because it assumes and asserts that any human being from any social background can achieve the highest spiritual state of existence.

=== Non-Hindu texts ===
Outside of the conflicting stances within the Hindu texts, non-Hindu texts present a different picture about the Shudras. A Buddhist text, states Patton, "refers to Shudras who know the Vedas, grammar, Mimamsa, Samkhya, Vaisheshika and lagna".

According to Johannes Bronkhorst, a professor of Indology specialising in early Buddhism and Hinduism, the ancient Buddhist canon is predominantly devoid of varna discussions, and the varnas are rarely referred to in its ancient discourses. The Buddhist texts do not describe the Indian society as divided into the four varṇas of "Brahmins, Ksạtriyas, Vaiśyas and Śūdras". Instead, states Bronkhorst, the bulk of society is described as consisting of "householders" (Pāli: gahapati), without internal distinctions. Even where the Brahmins are mentioned in such a context, they too are referred to as householders, or Brāhmaṇa-gahapati. The term vaṇṇa does appear in the Buddhist texts as few exceptions, but states Bronkhorst, only in the context of abstract divisions of society and it seems to "have remained a theoretical concept without any parallel in actual practice".

== Disabilities ==
The Śāstra literature lists various disabilities of śūdras.

1. Barred from studying and hearing the Vedas. The prohibition was based on Vedic passages, but Kane notes in ancient times was the prohibition not as "absolute and universal". Śūdras were permitted to hear the Itihāsa and Purāṇa texts.
2. Barred from performing Vedic sacrifices and instituting sacred Vedic fires. Śūdras were permitted to perform pūrta-dharma (building wells, tanks, temples, parks, and distributing charity), to perform the five daily Mahāyajñas in ordinary fire, perform the Śrāddha, all without Vedic mantras and speaking only "namaḥ".
3. There exist conflicting opinions regarding saṁskāras. The most restrictive text, the Mānava Dharmaśāstra, bars śūdras from all saṁskāras. The most liberal texts allow performance of the childhood saṁskāras preceding Vedic study along with vivāha ("marriage"), all without the use of Vedic mantras.
4. Higher punishments for certain offenses such as sexual intercourse, adultery, rape, slander, or libel of a person of higher varṇa. For some certain offenses such as theft a śūdra received less punishment than higher varṇas.
5. Longer impurity of one month during death and birth in the family.
6. Barred from being a judge or propounding dharma.
7. Barred from giving gifts to brāhmaṇas except in extreme situations.
8. Brāhmaṇas generally prohibited from taking food from śūdras unless the śūdra be in the brāhmaṇa's employ.
9. Texts vary on whether or not a śūdra may touch a brāhmaṇa without expiation on the brāhmaṇa's part.
10. A śūdra was only entitled to the gr̥hastha ("householder") āśrama (stage).
11. The penance for killing a śūdra was less than a person of the higher varṇas.

Kane notes that despite these disabilities the śūdras had many advantages; they were free from the minutiae of rules, regulations, and constant rituals required of the higher varnas.

== Education ==
Historian R. S. Sharma, after discussing several examples concludes that the dharmaśāstras did not allow the Shudras access to literacy but allowed them to learn arts and crafts such as elephant training, etc. He also adds that texts denied them Vedic education as it was believed to impede agriculture and vice versa. While the other varnas showed varying degrees of literacy, the Shudras were generally illiterate. The social reformer Jyotirao Phule blamed the deterioration of the Shudras on illiteracy and emphasised education for them.

== Occupation ==
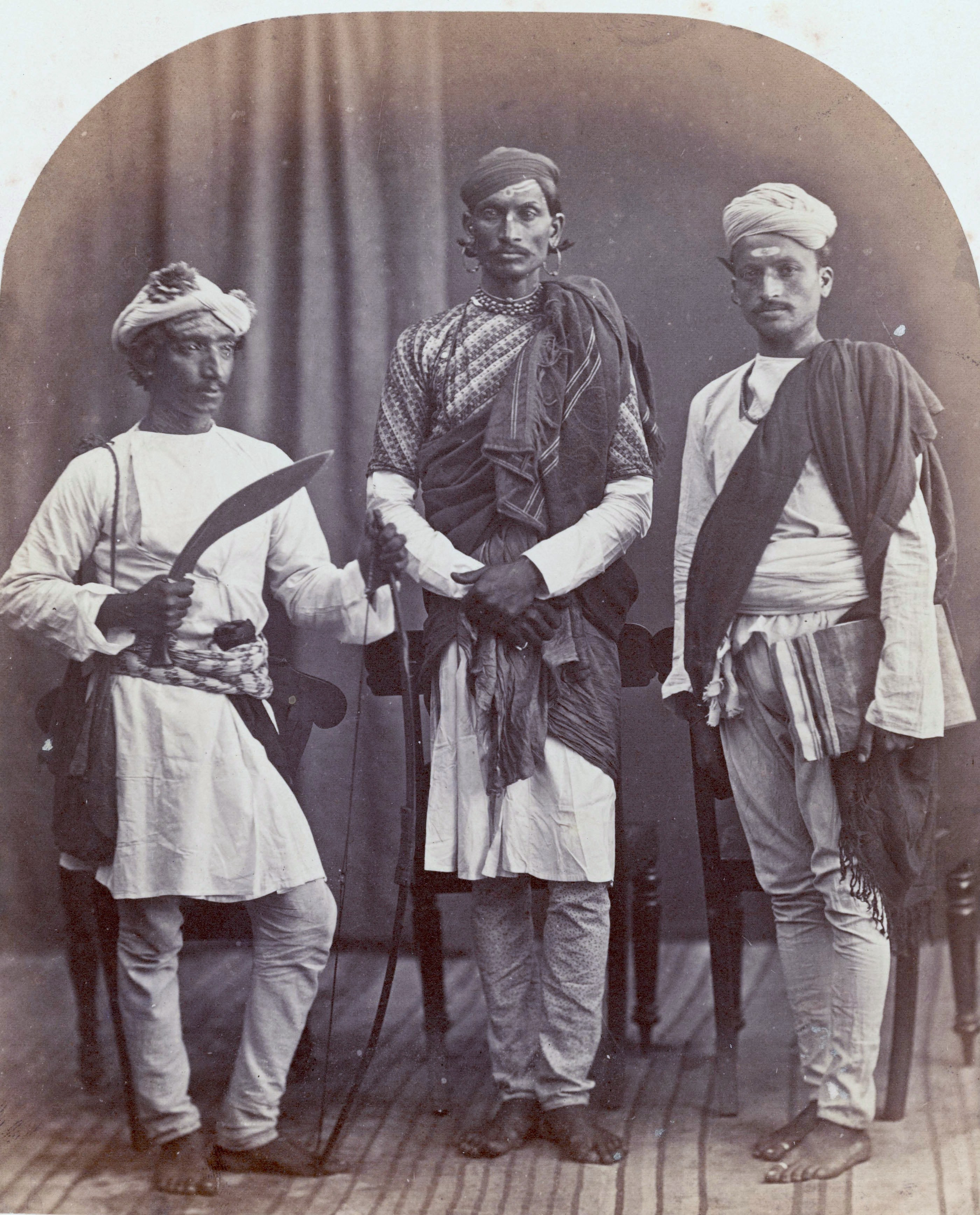
From left to right: A Gurkha, a Brahmin, and a Shudra, Simla, 1868.

Traditionally, Shudras were peasants and artisans. The ancient texts designate the Shudra as a peasant. Shudras were described as the giver of grain and ancient texts describe a Shudra's mode of earning as being "by the sickle and ears of corn". The ancient precept, "Vedas are destroyer of agriculture and agriculture is destroyer of Vedas", is shown as one of the reasons as to why the Shudras were not allowed to learn Vedas. The fact that peasants were held as Shudras is also documented by Chinese traveller Xuanzang in the 7th century. Also, an "outcaste" who entered the profession of agriculture would be absorbed in the Shudra varna.

The Shudra, states Marvin Davis, are not required to learn the Vedas. They were not dvija or "twice-born", and their occupational sphere stated as service (seva) of the other three varna. The word Dvija is neither found in any Vedas and Upanishads, nor is it found in any Vedanga literature such as the Shrauta-sutras or Grihya-sutras. The word is almost entirely missing, in any context, from ancient Sanskrit literature composed before the last centuries of the 1st millennium BCE, and it scarcely appears in the dharmasutras. Increasing mentions of it appear in the dharmasastras of mid to late 1st millennium CE. The presence of the word dvija is a marker that the text is likely a medieval-era text.

The traditional occupation of Shudra as described by Ghurye is agriculture, trade and crafts. However, this categorisation varies by scholar. As per Drekmeier state "Vaishya and Shudra actually shared many occupations and were frequently grouped together".

The Arthashastra mentions Shudra as artisans while the Vishnusmriti (3rd century) states all arts to be their occupational domain. In contrast, the Parasarasmriti and other texts state that arts and crafts are the occupational domain of all four varnas.

Other sources state that this statement of occupations of Shudra is a theoretical discussion found in select texts, it is not historical. Other Hindu texts such as the epics, states Naheem Jabbar, assert that Shudras played other roles such as kings and ministers. According to Ghurye, in reality, the hereditary occupation aspect of Shudra and other varnas was missing from large parts of India, and all four varnas (Brahmins, Kshatriyas, Vaishyas and Shudras) were agriculturalists, traders or became warriors in large numbers depending on economic opportunity and circumstantial necessities. According to Ghurye:

Though theoretically the position of the Shudras was very low, there is evidence to show that many of them were well-to-do. Some of them succeeded in marrying their daughters in royal families. Sumitra, one of the 3 wives of king Dasharatha, was a Shudra. Some of them even worked their way up to throne.

— G. C. Ghurye, Caste and Race in India

=== Bali, Indonesia ===
Among the Hindu communities of Bali, Indonesia, the Shudra (locally spelled Soedra) have typically been the temple priests, though depending on the demographics, a temple priest may also be a Brahmin (Brahmana), Kshatriya (Ksatrya) or Vaishya. In most regions, it has been the Shudra who typically make offerings to the gods on behalf of the Hindu devotees, chant prayers, recite meweda (Vedas), and set the course of Balinese temple festivals.

=== Historical evidence ===
Scholars have tried to locate historical evidence for the existence and nature of varna and jati in documents and inscriptions of medieval India. Supporting evidence for the existence of varna and jati systems in medieval India has been elusive, and contradicting evidence has emerged.

Varna is rarely mentioned in the extensive medieval era records of Andhra Pradesh, for example. This has led Cynthia Talbot, a professor of history and Asian studies, to question whether varna was socially significant in the daily lives of this region. The mention of jati is even rarer, through the 13th century. Two rare temple donor records from warrior families of the 14th century claim to be Shudras. One states that Shudras are the bravest, the other states that Shudras are the purest.

Richard Eaton, a professor of history, writes, "anyone could become a warrior regardless of social origins, nor do the jati appear as features of people's identity. Occupations were fluid." Evidence shows, according to Eaton, that Shudras were part of the nobility, and many "father and sons had different professions, suggesting that social status was earned, not inherited" in the Hindu Kakatiya population in the Deccan region between the 11th and 14th centuries.

According to Johannes Bronkhorst, none of Ashoka's inscriptions mention the terms Kshatriyas, Vaishyas or Shudras, and only mention Brahmins and Śramaṇas.

Several popular medieval era Bhakti movement poet-saints and religious leaders were born in a Shudra family. Examples include Tukaram and Namdev. The compositions of Namdev have been popular not only in the Hindu community of Maharashtra, but also in the Sikh community. Sixty of his compositions were included by the Sikh Gurus of Punjab region as they compiled the Sikhism scripture the Guru Granth Sahib.

== Commentary ==
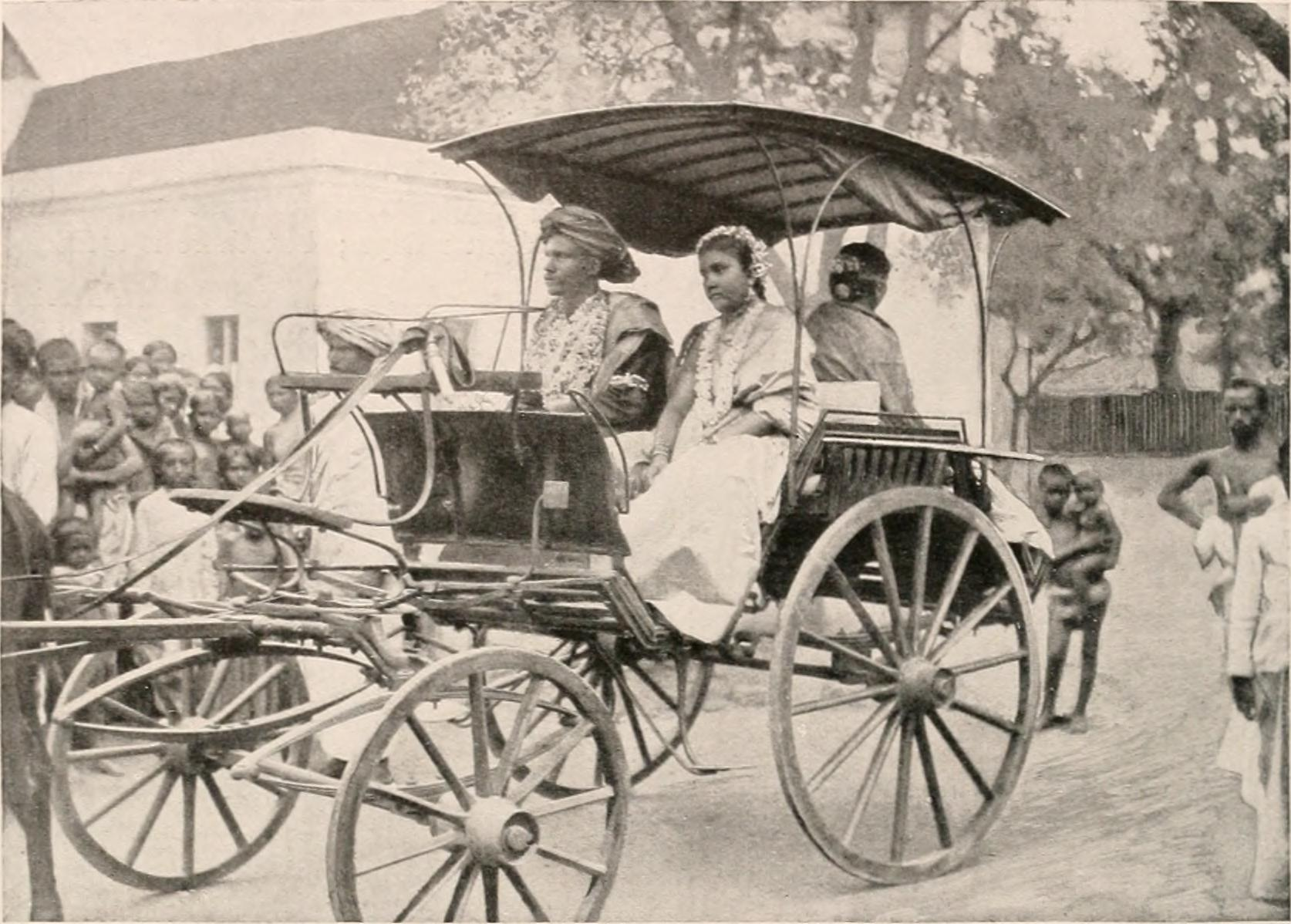
A 1908 photo of a bride and bridegroom of the sudra caste in a horse-drawn vehicle.

Dr Bhim Rao Ambedkar, a social reformer, believed that there were initially only three varnas: the Brahmin, Kshatriya and Vaishya, and that the Shudras were the Kshatriyas who were denied the Upanayana, an initiation ritual, by the Brahmins. This claim has been contested by historians such as R. S. Sharma. Sharma criticised Ambedkar for relying solely on translations of texts for his information, and stated Ambedkar wrote the book with the sole purpose to prove Shudras were of high caste origin, which was very popular among the highly educated parts of the lower castes during that time period.

Sri Aurobindo states Shudra and the other varna is a concept found in all human beings in different proportions. He states that this was externalised and mechanised into a system quite different from what it was intended.

The tenets of Vedic Hinduism in north India held less sway in the south, where the societal divisions were simply three distinguishable classes, the Brahmins, the non-Brahmins and the Dalits. The two intermediate dvija varnas—the Kshatriyas and Vaishyas—did not exist.

== See also ==
- Sat-Sudra
- Chuhra
- Other Backward Class
- Who Were the Shudras? (Book)
