= Karl Keating =

American Catholic activist (born 1950)

Karl Keating (born 1950) is an American Catholic apologist and author who founded and presided over Catholic Answers, a lay apostolate of Catholic apologetics and evangelization.

Keating's book Catholicism and Fundamentalism was based on a 1988 series that ran for 30 weeks in The Wanderer.

== Catholic Answers ==
In August 1986, the first Catholic Answers Newsletter was published. In January 1990, Catholic Answers published the monthly magazine This Rock. For nine years, Keating served as the editor.

In 1988, Keating changed careers and went into apologetics full-time. He has been a columnist for The Wanderer, the National Catholic Register and the Canadian Catholic Review. He has also acted as expert on EWTN's Questions and Answers forum.

A 2004 complaint to the Internal Revenue Service by the pro-choice organization Catholics for a Free Choice led to an IRS investigation of Catholic Answers that Keating described as costly and onerous. As a result, he formed a new organization with a separate 501(c)(4) tax status, called Catholic Answers Action, that continued publishing his Voter's Guide for Serious Catholics. This instructs readers not to vote for candidates who would vote for legalization of any of five alleged "non-negotiable" issues (abortion, euthanasia, embryonic stem cell research, human cloning, and gay marriage).

== Books ==
- Catholicism and Fundamentalism: The Attack on "Romanism" by "Bible Christians" (Ignatius Press, 1988)
- What Catholics Really Believe (Servant Publications, 1992)
- Nothing but the Truth: Essays in Apologetics (Catholic Answers Press, 2000)
- The Usual Suspects: Answering Anti-Catholic Fundamentalists (Ignatius Press, 2000)
- Controversies: High-Level Catholic Apologetics (Ignatius Press, 2001)
- Jeremiah's Lament (Rasselas House, 2015)
- No Apology (Rasselas House, 2015)
- Anti-Catholic Junk Food (Rasselas House, 2015)
- The New Geocentrists (Rasselas House, 2015)
- Apologetics the English Way (Rasselas House, 2015)
- How to Fail at Hiking Mt. Whitney (Rasselas House, 2017)
- How to Fail at Hiking Grand Canyon (Rasselas House, 2017)
- The Bible Battle (Rasselas House, 2017)
- High Desert Showdown (Rasselas House, 2017)
- Tracking Down the True Church (Rasselas House, 2017)
- Face Off with an Ex-Priest (Rasselas House, 2017)
- Debating Catholicism (Rasselas House, 2017)
- Booked for Life (Catholic Answers Press, 2017)
