= Morobhatt Dandekar =

Morobhatt Dandekar (Note: IAST: Mora-bhaṭṭa Dāndekara; Alternative transliterations of the name include Morabhat Dandekar, Morobhat Dandekar, and Moro-bhatt Dandekar) was a Hindu pandit and apologist from Bombay, British India. In response to Christian missionary activities, he wrote the Marathi language Hindu apologetic work Shri Hindu Dharma Sthapana (1831) and published the monthly magazine Upadesha Chandrika (1844).

== Shri Hindu Dharma Sthapana ==
Shri Hindu Dharma Sthapana
- Author: Morobhatt Dandekar
- Original title: श्री हिन्दू धर्म स्थापना
- Language: Marathi
- Subject: Criticism of Christianity, Hindu apologetics
- Genre: non-fiction
- Publication date: 1831
- Publication place: British India

In February 1831, Dandekar debated with Christian missionary John Wilson for six successive evenings, each man aiming to defend his religion. Dandekar's 1831 Marathi language text Shri Hindu Dharma Sthapana (Note: IAST: Śrī-hindu-dharma-sthāpana. English translations of the title include "Establishment of the Venerable Hindu Religion", "Foundations of Hindu Religion", "The Verification of the Hindoo Religion" and "Vindication of Hindu Religion") summarizes his objections to Christianity.

In the book, Dandekar responds to several Christian criticisms of Hinduism. For example, he argues:

- The virtuous actions of the Hindu gods far outnumber those of Jesus.
- Krishna's acts of stealing butter are justified because he is the lord of the Universe, and everything belongs to him. Moreover, the residents of Gokula wanted him to come to their homes, and he gratified them by visiting their homes to steal.
- The legends of Rama and Krishna should not perplex to those who believe in the Christian trinity. For example, the descriptions of power of the god are inconsistent with the description of Jesus' sufferings and miserable death: if Christians don't find this bewildering, why should Hindus find the stories of Rama and Krishna bewildering?
- Christians say that ignorance arises from Hindu rituals such as bathing in the Ganges water or worshipping of an idol of Krishna. Then, how do they justify Christian rituals such as baptism by water, eating bread while muttering words, or drinking spirits?

If you ask why Rama, Krishna, and other incarnations, accomplished the salvation of men in this or that particular manner, we ask you in return why God sent his Son into the world, and why, for the salvation of men, he brought him into a state so reproachful and so appalling. What! Had he no other way of saving the world?

— English translation of Shri Hindu Dharma Sthapana in Wilson's An Exposure of the Hindu Religion

According to Dandekar, the people who see something objectionable in Hinduism must have committed sins in their former births, which explains their "unhappy circumstance".

Balshastri Jambhekar, in the 13 April 1832 issue of The Bombay Durpun, described the work as "the first instance of a Brahmin coming forward publicly to vindicate the Hindu Religion, and entering the field of public discussion by publishing a work in defence of it."

An English translation of the text appears in Wilson's An Exposure of the Hindu Religion, along with Wilson's response to these objections. Narayan Rao of Satara responded to Wilson's text in a pamphlet edited by Dandekar, and Wilson repsonded to it with A Second Exposure of the Hindu Religion (1834).

== Upadesha Chandrika ==
In 1843, Narayan Sheshadri, a Deshastha Brahmin educated in a mission school, adopted Christianity, leading to a controversy in Bombay. In response, Morobhat Dandekar published the Marathi monthly magazine Upadesha Chandrika (Note: IAST: Upadeśa-candrikā; also transliterated Updesh Chandrika, Marathi for "Moonlight of Admonition"), which featured anti-Christianity religious polemic. The publication ran for one year, during 1844; the 12th issue – dated December 1844 – was published in January 1845.
