= Trent Horn =

American Catholic apologist and academic (born 1985)

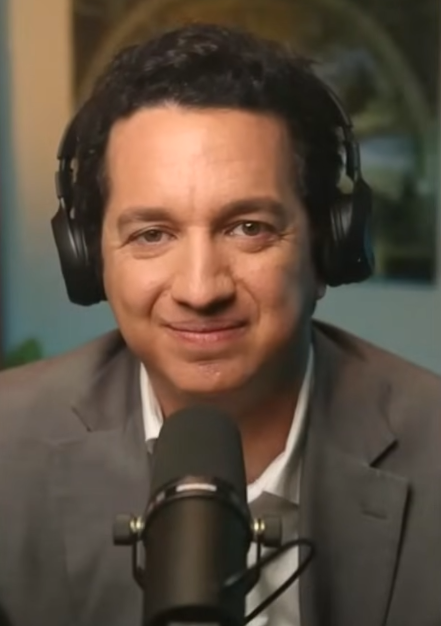
- Horn in 2024
- Born: 1985 (age 40–41); San Diego, California, U.S.
- Education: Arizona State University (BA); Franciscan University of Steubenville (MA)
- Occupations: Catholic apologist; writer; academic
- Years active: 2012–present
- Known for: Catholic apologetics

YouTube information
- Channel: The Counsel of Trent
- Genre: Podcasting
- Subscribers: 359 thousand
- Views: 79.14 million
- Horn's voice (2024) Horn, on the relationship of Catholicism and science, argues that religion encourages discovery.
- Last updated: 18 October 2026
- Website: Official website

Trent Horn (born 1985) is an American Catholic apologist, writer, and academic. He is best known for his work in apologetics and his role as a speaker and educator on various aspects of Catholic teaching, in addition to his engagement in numerous debates regarding religious, philosophical, and political matters.

Horn was an apologist for Catholic Answers from 2012 to 2026, and has hosted the podcast The Counsel of Trent since 2019.

Horn has published several books, including Why We're Catholic: Our Reasons For Faith, Hope, And Love, and Answering Atheism: How to Make the Case for God with Logic and Charity.

== Background ==
=== Early life and conversion ===
Horn was born in San Diego, California, to a Jewish father and an ex-Catholic mother who had converted to Protestantism.

A self-proclaimed former Deist, he has stated he was highly skeptical of religion in his youth, considering it to be "a crutch for the simple-minded." He was eventually introduced to Catholicism during his sophomore year of high school, when he participated in an event organized by a Catholic youth group and was subsequently invited to attend the Holy Mass, deciding to embrace the religion at the age of 17 upon further study.

=== Education ===
In 2012, Horn obtained a graduate degree in theology from Franciscan University of Steubenville; in 2018, he was awarded a graduate degree in philosophy from Holy Apostles College. Additionally, he holds a bachelor's degree in history from Arizona State University.

== Career ==
=== Apologetics ===
Upon graduating from Franciscan University of Steubenville in 2012, Horn became active in Catholic apologetics, joining the staff of Catholic Answers as an apologist. Since then, he has participated in numerous debates on topics such as the existence of God, the validity of Christian scripture, and the nature of truth, often engaging with both religious and secular opponents; places he has been invited to debate include UC Berkeley, UC Santa Barbara, and Stanford University.

Horn's debate opponents have included skeptics such as Richard Carrier, Dan Barker, Matt Dillahunty, and Alex O’Connor, and Protestant Christians such as James White, Redeemed Zoomer and Gavin Ortlund. Horn has also been active in the pro-life movement, and he went to various colleges to debate abortion before he became an internet personality. Horn left Catholic Answers in 2026.

=== Academia ===
Horn works as an adjunct professor of apologetics at Holy Apostles College.

== Personal life ==
Horn is married to Laura Horn. They have three children. He previously lived in Kansas before moving to Dallas–Fort Worth metroplex in Texas.

== Bibliography ==
- Why We're Catholic: Our Reasons for Faith, Hope, and Love
- MADE THIS WAY: How to Prepare Kids to Face Today's Tough Moral Issues (with Leila Miller)
- The Case for Catholicism: Answers to Classic and Contemporary Protestant Objections
- Persuasive Pro Life: How to Talk about Our Culture's Toughest Issue (foreword by Frank Pavone) (2014)
- Answering Atheism - How to Make the Case for God with Logic and Charity (2013)
- Hard Sayings: A Catholic Approach to Answering Bible Difficulties (2016)
- Counterfeit Christs: Finding the Real Jesus Among the Imposters
- Can a Catholic Be a Socialist? (with Catherine R. Pakaluk)
- What the Saints Never Said (2018)
- Confusion in the Kingdom: How "Progressive" Catholicism Is Bringing Harm and Scandal to the Church
- When Protestants Argue Like Atheists: 12 Weird Ways That Anti-Catholics Mimic Secular Skeptics
- Devil's Advocate: Facing My Inner Anti-Catholic
- The Mystery of God Study Guide (2015)
- El Misterio de Dios – Guia de Studio (The Mystery of God Study Guide) (by Robert Barron and Trent Horn)
- From Creation to Catholicism (with Patrick Coffin)

=== 20 Answers Series ===
- 20 Answers - Mormonism (20 Answers Series from Catholic Answers)
- 20 Answers - Jehovah's Witnesses (20 Answers Series from Catholic Answers) (2015)
- 20 Answers - Eucharist (20 Answers Series from Catholic Answers)
- 20 Answers - God (20 Answers Series from Catholic Answers)
- 20 Answers - The Real Jesus (20 Answers Series from Catholic Answers)
- 20 Answers - Faith & Science (20 Answers Series from Catholic Answers)
- 20 Answers - Abortion (20 Answers Series from Catholic Answers)
- 20 Answers - The Bible (20 Answers Series from Catholic Answers)
- 20 Answers - Death & Judgment (20 Answers Series from Catholic Answers)
- 20 Answers - The Church (20 Answers Series from Catholic Answers)
