= Bapudeva Sastri =

Indian scholar in Sanskrit and mathematics and translator (1821-1900)

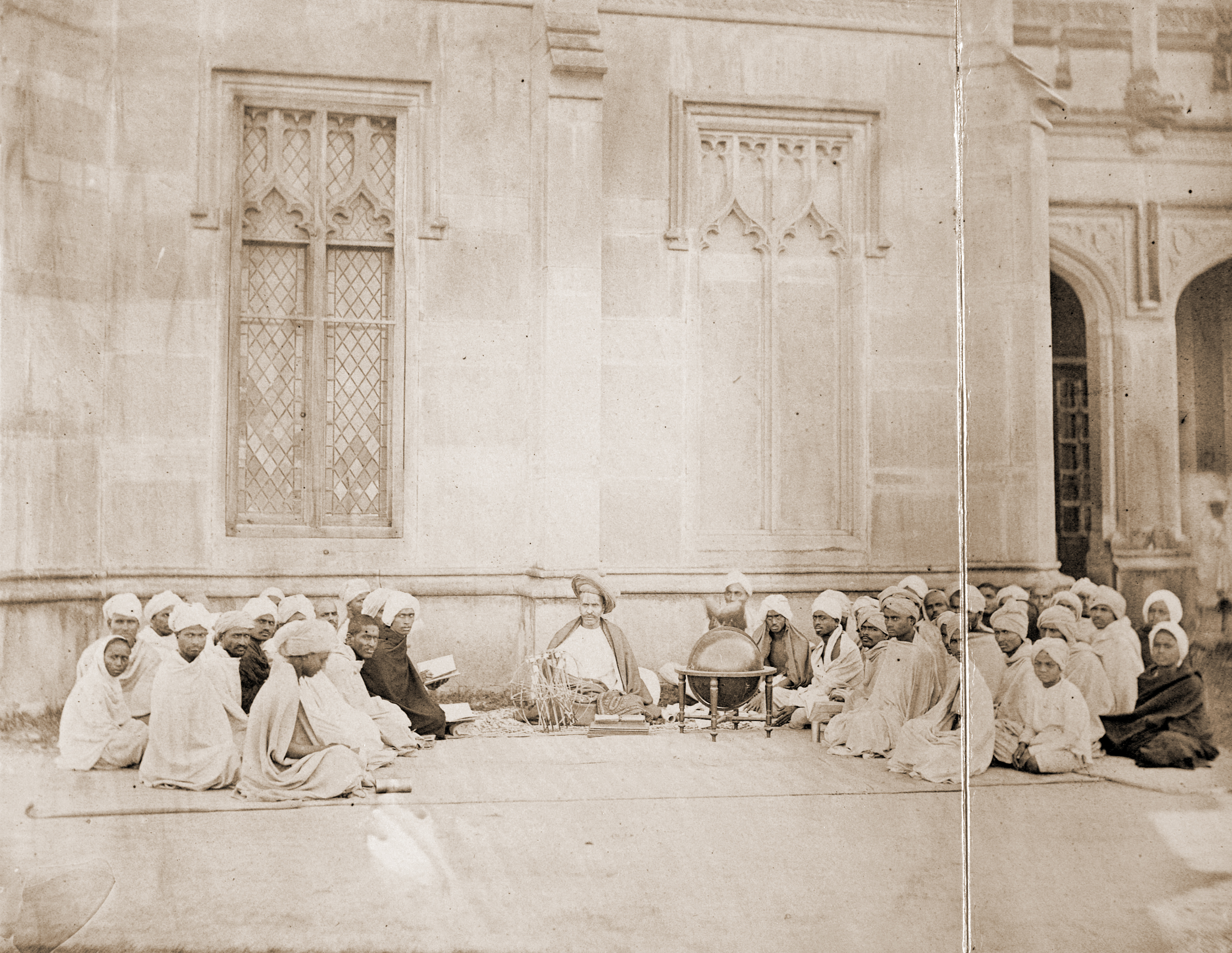
Bapudeva Sastri, holding globe, Professor of Astronomy, teaching a class at Queen's College, Varanasi, 1870.

Bapudeva Sastri or Narasimha Deva Paranjpe (1821–1900) was an Indian mathematician.

== Biography ==
He was born on 1 November 1821, to a Hindu Brahmin family of Maharashtra. He received his early education in arithmetic and algebra at the Marathi school in Nagpur. He also studied the Lilāvati and Bijaganita under Dhundiraja Misra. Noting his talent, the British political agent Lancelot Wilkinson secured his admission to the Sehore Sanskrit school where he studied Siddhānta Shiromani, Euclidean Geometry and European science in general under Pandit Sevarama and Wilkinson himself. In 1842 Sastri went to Government Sanskrit College, Varanasi, where he taught rekha-ganita (Euclidean Geometry). In 1890 Sudhakar Dwivedi was appointed the teacher of mathematics and astrology after Bapudeva Sastri, retired in 1889.

== Scholarly works ==
Bapudeva Sastri translated the Siddhānta Shiromani (a treatise on Hindu mathematics written in the twelfth century by Bhaskaracharya) and published it in Benares in 1891. With Lancelot Wilkinson, Sastri wrote commentary on The Surya Siddhanta (a treatise on Hindu astronomy).

- English translation of the Surya Siddhanta and the Siddhanta Siromani by Sastri, 1861
