= Sat-Shudra =

Caste classification in Hindu society

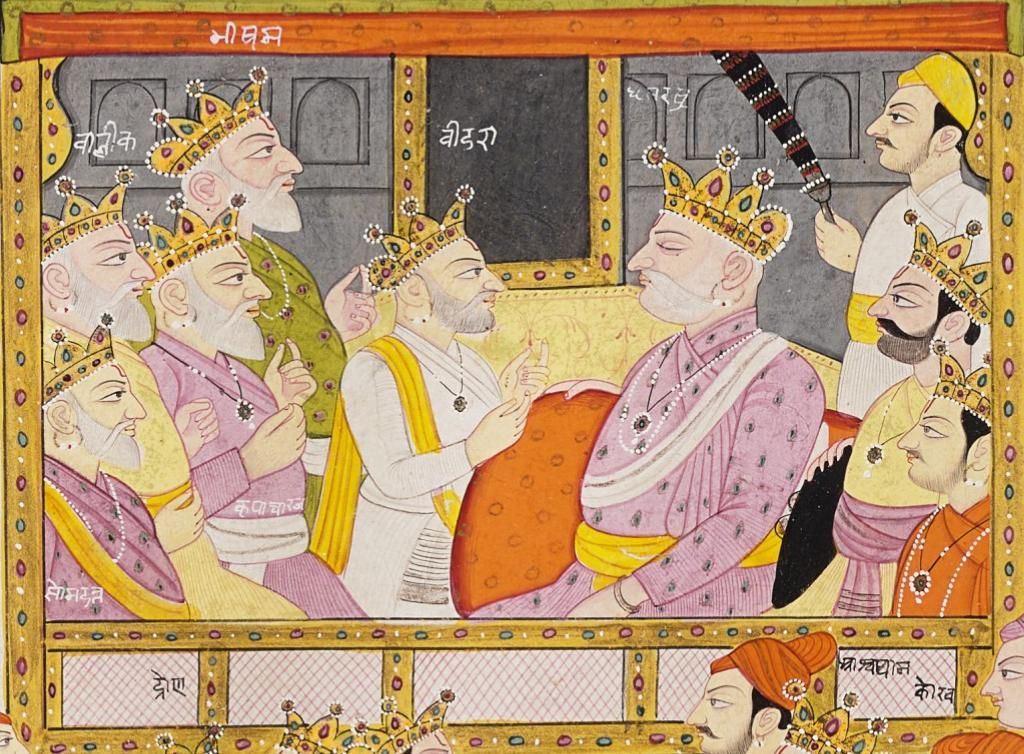
Vidura, A sat-shudra conferring Dhritarashtra

Sat-Shudra, सच्छूद्र, sacchūdra (lit. Good/Pure Shudra) is a caste classification found in ancient Hindu texts and mentioned in several British Raj records. They are also known as केवलशूद्र (Kevalaśūdra) and महाशूद्र (mahāśūdra) in Sanskrit texts. The Sat-Shudras were placed below the Dvijas, and were considered higher than other asat-Shudras.

== Etymology ==
It is formed by two sanskrit words sat (meaning good or pure) and śūdra. In Sanskrit, it's written as सच्छूद्र due to mandatory rules of internal Sandhi. The term originally refers to a class of Shudra which are benevolent towards the Vedic Religion.

== History ==
The characteristics of a sat-shudra class is described as devotion to Brahmins and Devatas, lack of envy and having good conduct, as per Brihaddharma Purana. Skanda Purana primarily adds the characteristic of having a dharmic wife of the same class, while the Bhavishya Purana mentions avoiding alcohol as another characteristic. They classify Sat-Shudras strictly as uttama-saṅkara, higher tier of mixed-caste offspring. No Sanskrit text evidence is known to classify vratyas as sat-shudras which postulates it to be a modern mislabelling by modern scholars who have mixed the two terms.

=== Vratya ===
Vrātya refers to fallen Dvijas (twice-born) who attained the status of a Shudra due to the omission of sacred rites (like the Upanayana) and the absence of Brahmins.

According to Puranic texts, the Sakas, Yavanas, Bahlikas, Kambojas, and Dravidas were Kshatriyas who are said to have become vrātya or mlechha (outcaste) caste. During the British periods, certain Brahmin communities, such as the Bhumihar Brahmins, Pushpaka Brahmins, and Pirali Brahmins, were classified as degraded Brahmins. Despite this perception, they maintained significant wealth and status as landlords in the pre-British era or Medieval India.

In Ancient India, Brahmins and Kshatriyas rulers performed a ritual called Hiranyagarbha, which was used to reclaim their lost varna rites. It was a sacrifice aimed at obtaining divine sanction from the original creator – Brahma or Prajapati – who were believed to be born from a Hiranyagarbha, or golden conception. This concept, though simple, was considered expensive during that period.

The term "hiranyagarbha" translates to "golden womb," symbolized by a golden pot (kunda) offered to a Brahmana and the deity Vishnu. During the ritual, the donor conducts an archana (worship ritual) and recites a mantra praising Vishnu as Hiranyagarbha. Subsequently, the donor enters the "golden womb" while priests perform rites similar to those for a pregnant woman, including garbhadhana, pumsavana, and simantonnayana. Upon emerging from the "golden womb," the priests perform jatakarma and other rites customary for a newborn. The donor then recites a mantra proclaiming a "rebirth" from the divine womb, thus referred to as "born of the hiranyagarbha." After the ceremony, the donor gifts the "golden womb" and other offerings to the priests.
