= Lancelot Wilkinson =

British political officer and civil servant in East India Company (1805-1841)

Lancelot Wilkinson (22 June 1805 – 13 November 1841) was a British political officer and civil servant who worked in the service of the East India Company in India in Bhopal, in the Bombay Presidency. He was also an Indologist, publishing translations of Indian works including the Siddhanta Shiromani, an astronomical text, and Vajrasuchi, an ancient text against Brahminism.

== Biography ==
Wilkinson was born in Crosby-Ravensworth, Cumbria, son of James and Nanny née Eggleston and went to India after receiving training at Haileybury College. He started working in India Writer from 1822, an assistant to the collector of south Konkan from 1824, an assistant Resident at Nagpur from 1826, and lastly as a Political Agent in Bhopal from 1836. He was a proponent of education in Indian languages and opposed William Bentinck on anglicism. He interacted with Indian scholars and came to learn of Bhaskara's 12th century Siddhanta Shiromani, an astronomical text and worked on translating it into English. He found it to be very advanced, with a heliocentric model which contrasted with the Puranas which promoted a geocentric, flat-earth view. Wilkinson worked with Bapu Deva Sastri (Narasimha Deva Paranjpe; 1821–1890) who he appointed from Pune to the Benares Sanskrit College. Wilkinson also wrote against female infanticide, supported widow remarriage and translated the Vajrasuchi, an anti-Brahminical text.

Notable protégés of Wilkinson included Subaji Bapu, Omkar Bhatt, and Bapudeva Sastri.
