= Apologetics =

Religious discipline of systematic defence of a position

Apologetics (from Ancient Greek ἀπολογία (apología) 'speech in defense') is the defense of religious doctrines through systematic argumentation and discourse. Some sources identify apologetics as a separate branch of theology, especially when applied to Christianity. Early Christian writers (c. 120–220) who defended their beliefs against critics and recommended their faith to outsiders have become known as early examples of Christian apologists. (Compare the Hellenistic Greek word ἀπολογιστής, meaning "accountant", or "bookkeeper".)

== Etymology ==
The term apologetics derives from the Ancient Greek word apologia (ἀπολογία). In the Classical Greek legal system, the prosecution delivered the kategoria (κατηγορία), the accusation or charge, and the defendant replied with an apologia, the defence. The apologia was a formal speech or explanation to reply to and rebut the charges. A famous example is Socrates' Apologia defense, as chronicled in Plato's Apology.

In the Koine Greek of the New Testament, the Apostle Paul employs the term apologia in his trial speech to Festus and Agrippa when he says "I make my defense" in Acts 26:2. A cognate form appears in Paul's Letter to the Philippians as he is "defending the gospel" in Philippians 1:7, and in "giving an answer" in 1 Peter 3:15.

Although the term apologetics has Western, primarily Christian origins and is most frequently associated with the defense of Christianity, the term is sometimes used referring to the defense of any religion in formal debate involving religion.

== Apologetic positions ==
=== Baháʼí Faith ===
Many apologetic books have been written in defence of the history or teachings of the Baháʼí Faith. The religion's founders wrote several books presenting proofs of their religion; among them are the Báb's Seven Proofs and Bahá'u'lláh's Kitáb-i-Íqán. Later Baháʼí authors wrote prominent apologetic texts, such as Mírzá Abu'l-Fadl's The Brilliant Proof and Udo Schaefer et al.'s Making the Crooked Straight.

=== Buddhism ===
One of the earliest Buddhist apologetic texts is The Questions of King Milinda, which deals with the Buddhist metaphysics such as the "no-self" nature of the individual and characteristics such as wisdom, perception, volition, feeling, consciousness and the soul. In the Meiji Era (1868–1912), encounters between Buddhists and Christians in Japan as a result of increasing contact between Japan and other nations may have prompted the formation of Japanese New Buddhism, including the apologetic Shin Bukkyō (新仏教) magazine. In recent times, A. L. De Silva, an Australian convert to Buddhism, has written a book, Beyond Belief, providing Buddhist apologetic responses and a critique of Christian Fundamentalist doctrine. Gunapala Dharmasiri wrote an apologetic critique of the Christian concept of God from a Theravadin Buddhist perspective.

=== Christianity ===
The Shield of the Trinity, a diagram frequently used by Christian apologists to explain the Trinity

Christian apologetics combines Christian theology, natural theology, and philosophy in an attempt to present a rational basis for the Christian faith, to defend the faith against objections and misrepresentation, and to show that the Christian doctrine is the only world-view that is faultless and consistent with all fundamental knowledge and questions.

Christian apologetics has taken many forms over the centuries. In the Roman Empire, Christians were severely persecuted, and many charges were brought against them. Examples in the Bible include the Apostle Paul's address to the Athenians in the Areopagus. J. David Cassel gives several examples: Tacitus wrote that Nero fabricated charges that Christians started the burning of Rome. Other charges included cannibalism (due to a literal interpretation of the Eucharist) and incest (due to early Christians' practice of addressing each other as "brother" and "sister"). Paul the Apostle, Justin Martyr, Irenaeus, and others often defended Christianity against charges that were brought to justify persecution.

Later apologists have focused on providing reasons to accept various aspects of Christian belief. Christian apologists of many traditions, in common with Jews, Muslims, and some others, argue for the existence of a unique and personal God. Theodicy is one important aspect of such arguments, and Alvin Plantinga's arguments have been highly influential in this area. Many prominent Christian apologists are scholarly philosophers or theologians, frequently with additional doctoral work in physics, cosmology, comparative religions, and other fields. Others take a more popular or pastoral approach. Some prominent modern apologists are Douglas Groothuis, Frederick Copleston, John Lennox, Walter R. Martin, Dinesh D'Souza, Douglas Wilson, Cornelius Van Til, Gordon Clark, Francis Schaeffer, Greg Bahnsen, Edward John Carnell, James White, R. C. Sproul, Hank Hanegraaff, Alister McGrath, Lee Strobel, Josh McDowell, Peter Kreeft, G. K. Chesterton, William Lane Craig, J. P. Moreland, Hugh Ross, David Bentley Hart, Gary Habermas, Norman Geisler, Scott Hahn, RC Kunst, Trent Horn, and Jimmy Akin.

Apologists in the Catholic Church include Bishop Robert Barron, G. K. Chesterton, Dr. Scott Hahn, Trent Horn, Jimmy Akin, Patrick Madrid, Kenneth Hensley, Karl Keating, Ronald Knox, and Peter Kreeft.

St. John Henry Newman (1801–1890) was an English convert to Roman Catholicism, later made a cardinal, canonized in 2019, and proclaimed a Doctor of the Church by Pope Leo XIV in 2025. In early life, he was a major figure in the Oxford Movement to bring the Church of England back to its Catholic roots. Eventually his studies in history persuaded him to become a Roman Catholic. When John Henry Newman entitled his spiritual autobiography Apologia Pro Vita Sua in 1864, he was playing upon both this connotation, and the more commonly understood meaning of an expression of contrition or regret.

Christian apologists employ a variety of philosophical and formal approaches, including ontological, cosmological, and teleological arguments. The Christian presuppositionalist approach to apologetics uses the transcendental argument for the existence of God.

Tertullian was an early Christian apologist. He was born, lived, and died in Carthage. He is sometimes known as the "Father of the Latin Church". He introduced the term Trinity (Latin: trinitas) to the Christian vocabulary and probably the formula "three Persons, one Substance" as the Latin "tres Personae, una Substantia" (from the Koine Greek "treis Hypostaseis, Homoousios"), and the terms Vetus Testamentum (Old Testament) and Novum Testamentum (New Testament).

==== The Church of Jesus Christ of Latter-day Saints ====
There are Latter-day Saint apologists who focus on the defense of Mormonism, including early church leaders, such as Parley P. Pratt, John Taylor, B. H. Roberts, and James E. Talmage, and modern figures, such as Hugh Nibley, Daniel C. Peterson, John L. Sorenson, John Gee, Orson Scott Card, and Jeff Lindsay.

Several well known apologetic organizations of the Church of Jesus Christ of Latter-day Saints, such as the Foundation for Ancient Research and Mormon Studies (a group of scholars at Brigham Young University) and FairMormon (an independent, not-for-profit group run by Latter Day Saints), have been formed to defend the doctrines and history of the Latter Day Saint movement in general and the Church of Jesus Christ of Latter-day Saints in particular.

=== Deism ===
Deism is a form of theism in which God created the universe and established rationally comprehensible moral and natural laws but no longer intervenes in human affairs. Deism is a natural religion where belief in God is based on application of reason and evidence observed in the designs and laws found in nature. The World Order of Deists maintains a web site presenting deist apologetics that demonstrate the existence of God based on evidence and reason, absent divine revelation.

=== Hinduism ===
Hindu apologetics began developing during the British colonial period. A number of Indian intellectuals had become critical of the British tendency to devalue the Hindu religious tradition. As a result, these Indian intellectuals, as well as a handful of British Indologists, were galvanized to examine the roots of the religion as well as to study its vast arcana and corpus in an analytical fashion. This endeavor drove the deciphering and preservation of Sanskrit. Many translations of Hindu texts were produced which made them accessible to a broader reading audience.

In the early 18th century, Christian missionary Bartholomäus Ziegenbalg engaged in dialogues with several Tamil-speaking Malabarian Hindu priests, and recorded arguments of these Hindu apologists. These records include German-language reports submitted to the Lutheran headquarters in Halle, and 99 letters written by the Hindu priests to him (later translated into German under the title Malabarische Korrespondenz from 1718 onwards).

During 1830–1831, missionary John Wilson engaged in debates with Hindu apologists in Bombay. In 1830, his protege Ram Chandra, a Hindu convert to Christianity, debated with several Hindu Brahmin apologists in public. Hindu pandit Morobhatt Dandekar summarized his arguments from his 1831 debate with Wilson in a Marathi-language work titled Shri-Hindu-dharma-sthapana. Narayana Rao, another Hindu apologist, wrote Svadesha-dharma-abhimani in response to Wilson.

In the mid-19th century, several Hindu apologist works were written in response to John Muir's Mataparīkṣā. These include Mata-parīkṣā-śikṣā (1839) by Somanatha of Central India, Mataparīkṣottara (1840) by Harachandra Tarkapanchanan of Calcutta, Śāstra-tattva-vinirṇaya (1844–1845) by Nilakantha Gore of Benares, and a critique (published later in 1861 as part of Dharmādharma-parīkṣā-patra) by an unknown Vaishnava writer.

A range of Indian philosophers, including Swami Vivekananda and Aurobindo Ghose, have written rational explanations regarding the values of the Hindu religious tradition. More modern proponents such as the Maharishi Mahesh Yogi have also tried to correlate recent developments from quantum physics and consciousness research with Hindu concepts. The late Reverend Pandurang Shastri Athavale has given a plethora of discourses regarding the symbolism and rational basis for many principles in the Vedic tradition. In his book The Cradle of Civilization, David Frawley, an American who has embraced the Vedic tradition, has characterized the ancient texts of the Hindu heritage as being like "pyramids of the spirit".

=== Islam ===
'Ilm al-Kalām, literally "science of discourse", usually foreshortened to kalam and sometimes called Islamic scholastic theology, is an Islamic undertaking born out of the need to establish and defend the tenets of Islamic faith against skeptics and detractors. A scholar of kalam is referred to as a mutakallim (plural mutakallimūn) as distinguished from philosophers, jurists, and scientists.

=== Judaism ===
Jewish apologetic literature can be traced back as far as Aristobulus of Paneas, though some discern it in the works of Demetrius the Chronographer (3rd century BCE) traces of the style of "questions" and "solutions" typical of the genre. Aristobulus was a Jewish philosopher of Alexandria and the author of an apologetic work addressed to Ptolemy VI Philometor. Josephus's Contra Apion is a wide-ranging defense of Judaism against many charges laid against Judaism at that time, as too are some of the works of Philo of Alexandria.

In response to modern Christian missionaries, and congregations that "are designed to appear Jewish, but are actually fundamentalist Christian churches, which use traditional Jewish symbols to lure the most vulnerable of our Jewish people into their ranks", Jews for Judaism is the largest counter-missionary organization in existence, today. Kiruv Organization (Mizrachi), founded by Rabbi Yosef Mizrachi, and Outreach Judaism, founded by Rabbi Tovia Singer, are other prominent international organizations that respond "directly to the issues raised by missionaries and cults, by exploring Judaism in contradistinction to fundamentalist Christianity."

=== Pantheism ===
Some pantheists have formed organizations such as the World Pantheist Movement and the Universal Pantheist Society to promote and defend the belief in pantheism.

=== Native Americans ===
In a famous speech called "Red Jacket on Religion for the White Man and the Red" in 1805, Seneca chief Red Jacket gave an apologetic for Native American religion.

== In literature ==
Plato's Apology may be read as both a religious and literary apology; however, more specifically literary examples may be found in the prefaces and dedications, which precede many Early Modern plays, novels, and poems. Eighteenth century authors such as Colley Cibber, Frances Burney, and William Congreve, to name but a few, prefaced the majority of their poetic work with such apologies. In addition to the desire to defend their work, the apologetic preface often suggests the author's attempt to humble his- or herself before the audience.

== See also ==
- Apophatic theology – Way of describing the divine by explaining what God is not
- Cataphatic theology – Way of describing the divine by using affirmative-form statements
- Christian apologetics – Christian theology that defends Christianity against objections
- Dawah – Proselytizing or preaching of Islam
- Existence of God – Philosophical question
- Kalam – Study of Islamic doctrines
- List of apologetic works
