= Vajrasuchi Upanishad =

Text of Hinduism

- Devanagari: वज्रसूची
- IAST: Vajrasūcī
- Title means: diamond-pointed needle
- Type: Samanya
- Linked Veda: Samaveda
- Chapters: 1
- Verses: 9
- Philosophy: Vedanta

The Vajrasuchi Upanishad (Sanskrit: वज्रसूची उपनिषत्, IAST: Vajrasūcī Upaniṣad; literally 'Diamond(-pointed) needle') is an important Sanskrit text and an Upanishad of Hinduism. It is classified as one of the 22 Samanya (general) Upanishads, and identified as a Vedanta text. It is attached to the Samaveda.

The text discusses the four varnas also called 'caste'. It is notable for being a systematic philosophical work against the division of human beings, and for asserting that any human being can achieve the highest spiritual state of existence.

== History ==
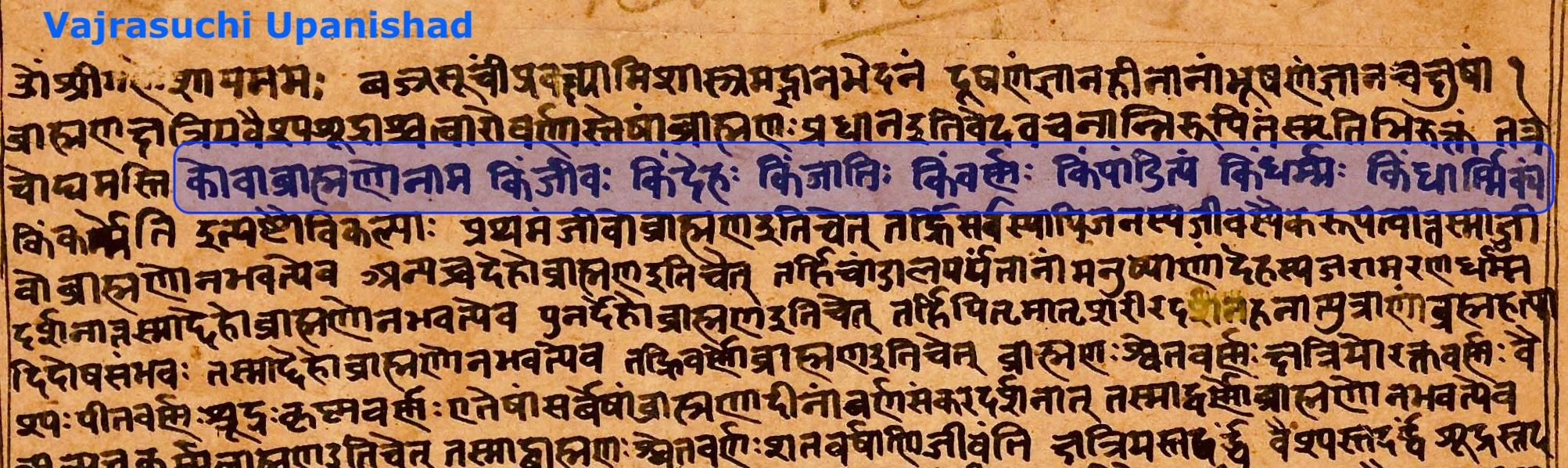
The opening lines of the Vajrasuchi Upanishad (Sanskrit, Devanagari script).

The date as well as the author of Vajrasūchi Upanishad is unclear. The Upanishad is attributed to Sankaracharya in the manuscripts discovered by early 1800s. Sankaracharya, also known as Adi Shankara, was an Advaita Vedanta scholar, but given the Indian tradition of dedicating and attributing texts to revered historical scholars, there is uncertainty whether texts attributed to Adi Shankara were actually composed by him or in the 8th century he likely lived in.

This text is also sometimes titled as vajrasūchika Upanishad, Vajra suchika Upanishad, vajrasūchi Upanishad, Vajrasucy Upanishad and Vajrasucyupanishad. In the Telugu language anthology of 108 Upanishads of the Muktika canon, narrated by Rama to Hanuman, it is listed at number 36.

=== The Vajrasūcī of pseudo-Aśvaghoṣa ===
After the discovery of palm-leaf manuscripts of the Vajrasuchi Upanishad manuscript, a Buddhist text attributed to 2nd-century CE Asvaghosa was published from Nepal with the same title Vajrasuchi, which is similar in its message as the Vajrasuchi Upanishad. It was published in 1839 by Hodgson, Wilkinson and Sūbajī Bāpū. This added to the complications in dating and in determining the author of the text. However, whether its author was Asvaghosa is considered seriously doubtful, according to many scholars, and most recently by Patrick Olivelle.

What is varna (class, caste)?

The Brahmana, the Kshatriya,
the Vaishya and the Shudra,
are the four varnas.
What is meant by Brahmana?
Is it his individual soul?
Is it his body?
Is it based on his birth?
Is it his knowledge?
Is it his deeds?
Is it his rites?

— Vajrasucika Upanishad, Verse 2
(Abridged)

== Buddhist Vajrasuchi and Hindu Vajrasuchi Upanishad ==
The relationship between the Vajrasuchi text of Buddhism and Vajrasuchi Upanishad of Hinduism has long been of interest to scholars. This interest began with Brian Houghton Hodgson – a colonial official based in Nepal who was loaned a Sanskrit text titled Vajra Suchi in 1829, by a Buddhist friend of his, whose contents turned out to be similar to the vajrasūchi Upanishad. In 1835, Hodgson published a translation. The first line of the Hodgson translation mentioned "Ashu Ghosa" and invoked "Manja Ghosa" as the Guru of the World. The details of the caste system, its antiquity and "shrewd and argumentative attack" by a Buddhist, in the words of Hodgson, gained wide interest among 19th-century scholars. The scholarship that followed, surmised that "Ashu Ghosa" is possibly the famous Buddhist scholar Asvaghosa, who lived around the 2nd century CE. It is widely known that Ashwagosh was the philosopher guide of king Kanishka.

== Reception ==
Mariola Offredi – a professor of literature at the University of Venice, states that among all pre-colonial Sanskrit texts, the vajrasūchi Upanishad is a "sustained philosophical attack against the division of human beings into four social classes determined by birth". While many other Hindu texts such as Bhagavad Gita and Puranas question and critique varna and social divisions, adds Offredi, these discussions are at their thematic margins; only in vajrasūchi Upanishad do we find the questioning and philosophical rejection of varna to be the central message.

Ashwani Peetush – a professor of philosophy at the Wilfrid Laurier University, states the Vajrasuchi Upanishad is a significant text because it assumes and asserts that any human being can achieve the highest spiritual state of existence.

The Vajrasuchi was studied and referred to by social reformers in the 19th century, states Rosalind O'Hanlon, to assert that "the whole of human kind is of one caste", that it is character not birth that distinguishes people.

== Scanned manuscripts ==
- MS Cambridge, University Library, Add.1421. URL
- MS Jammu, Raghunatha Temple Library, 953gha. The upaniṣad. URL

== Editions ==
- Aśvaghoṣa, B. H. Hodgson, Lancelot Wilkinson, and Sūbajī Bāpū. The Wujra Soochi or Refulation [Sic] of the Arguments Upon Which the Brahmanical Institution of Caste Is Founded. 1839. Scan at Archive.org
- Translation by Hodgson: "A Disputation Respecting Caste by a Buddhist, in the Form of a Series of Propositions Supposed to Be Put by a Saiva and Refuted by the Disputant" B. H. Hodgson. Transactions of the Royal Asiatic Society of Great Britain and Ireland, Vol. 3, No. 1 (1831), pp. 160-169 (10 pages). URL of JSTOR scan.
- Aśvaghoṣa, and William Morton. Vajra Suchi the needle of Adamant; or the original divine institution of caste. Jaffna: The Jaffna Religious Tract Society, America Mission Pr, 1851. This tr. also appeared in 1843 (Worldcat).
- Aśvaghoṣa, and Albrecht Weber. Die Vahrasuci des Asvaghosha, von A. Weber. Berlin, In Commission von F. Dummler, 1860. 205-264 p. Reprinted from the Abhandlungen der Konigl. Akademie der Wissenschaften Berlin, 1859. Scan at archive.org
- Aśvaghoṣa, and Adam White. Játibhed viveksár: or Reflection on the institution of caste. To which is appended a Marathi version of the sanscrit commentary by Manju Ghoshon the upanishad called Vajra Suchi. [Bombay]: Printed and published by Messrs. Wassudeo Babaji & Co., booksellers, 1861.
- Aśvaghoṣa. Vajrasūci = the Needle of the adamant or the original divine institution of Caste, examined and refuted. Mangalore: Basel Mission Book & Tract Depository, 1869.
- Aśvaghoṣa, and Ramayan Prasad Dwivedi (ed. and comm.), Mahākavi-aśvaghoṣakṛta vajra-sūcī: samānoddharaṇa-pāṭhabhedasahita-saṭippaṇa-'Maṇimayī'-hindīvyākhyopetā bauddha-darśana-granthaḥ = Vajrasūcī of Aśvaghoṣa : A small tract of Buddhist philosophy : Edited with Hindi translation, parallel passages and a critical introduction with exhaustive appendices. Varanasi: Chaukhamba Amarabharati Prakashan, 1985. Scan at Archive.org.
- Aśvaghoṣa, and Sujitkumar Mukhopadhyaya. The vajrasūchi of Asvaghosa: Sanskrit Text. Santiniketan: Sino-Indian Cultural Society, 1950. Scan at archive.org.
- Kagawa, Takao. 1958. "The Comparative Study on Some Texts of vajrasūchi". Journal of Indian and Buddhist Studies (I Bukkyogaku Kenkyu). 6, no. 1: 134–135. DOI https://doi.org/10.4259/ibk.6.134
- Ācārya Aśvaghoṣa kṛta Vajrasūcī Upaniṣada ... anuvādaka Bhante Ga. Prajñānanda. Dillī, Gautama Book Centre, 1990. Scan at archive.org

== See also ==
- Isha Upanishad
- Jabala Upanishad
- Maha Upanishad
- Nirvana Upanishad
