= Criticism of Hinduism =

Criticism of Hinduism has been applied to both the historical and the current aspects of Hinduism, notably the caste system and the sati practice.

== Historical background ==
=== Early opposition ===
Some of the earliest criticism of Hindu texts, including the Vedas and especially the Dharmashastras, come from the Sramana (or renunciate) traditions, including Buddhism and Jainism. Sramanans and Brahmins had a fierce rivalry over the years. In particular, Sramanas denied the sruti (divine) nature of the Vedas and opposed sacrificial rituals which were at the heart of Brahminical philosophy at the time.

The criticisms of Hinduism and Brahminical philosophy by Sramana scholars occurred primarily during the 6th century BCE to around the 8th century CE in ancient India. This period witnessed a flourishing of diverse philosophical schools, including Yoga, Buddhism, Jainism, Ajivikas, and other Sramana traditions that engaged in debates with orthodox Vedic practices.

The Sramanas rejected the rigid social hierarchy enforced by the Brahmins, which placed individuals into fixed social classes from birth. Sramana scholars criticized the emphasis on elaborate rituals and sacrificial practices in Brahminical philosophy. They believed that true spiritual progress could not be achieved through external ceremonies, but rather through internal transformation and self-realization. While Brahminical philosophy placed a strong emphasis on the authority of the Vedas as the sacred text, Sramana scholars questioned this authority severely. They advocated for individual experience, and the direct faithful realizations regardless of worldly or societal hierarchy, over 'blind' faith in scriptures.

Another point of contention was the contrast between ascetic practices favored by many Sramanas and the ritualistic approach promoted by Brahminical traditions. The Sramanas believed in renunciation and austerity as paths to spiritual liberation, while criticizing excessive materialism and attachment to worldly possessions. Sramana traditions, such as Jainism, placed a strong emphasis on non-violence (ahimsa), which stood in contrast to certain Vedic rituals that involved animal sacrifices.

== Sati ==
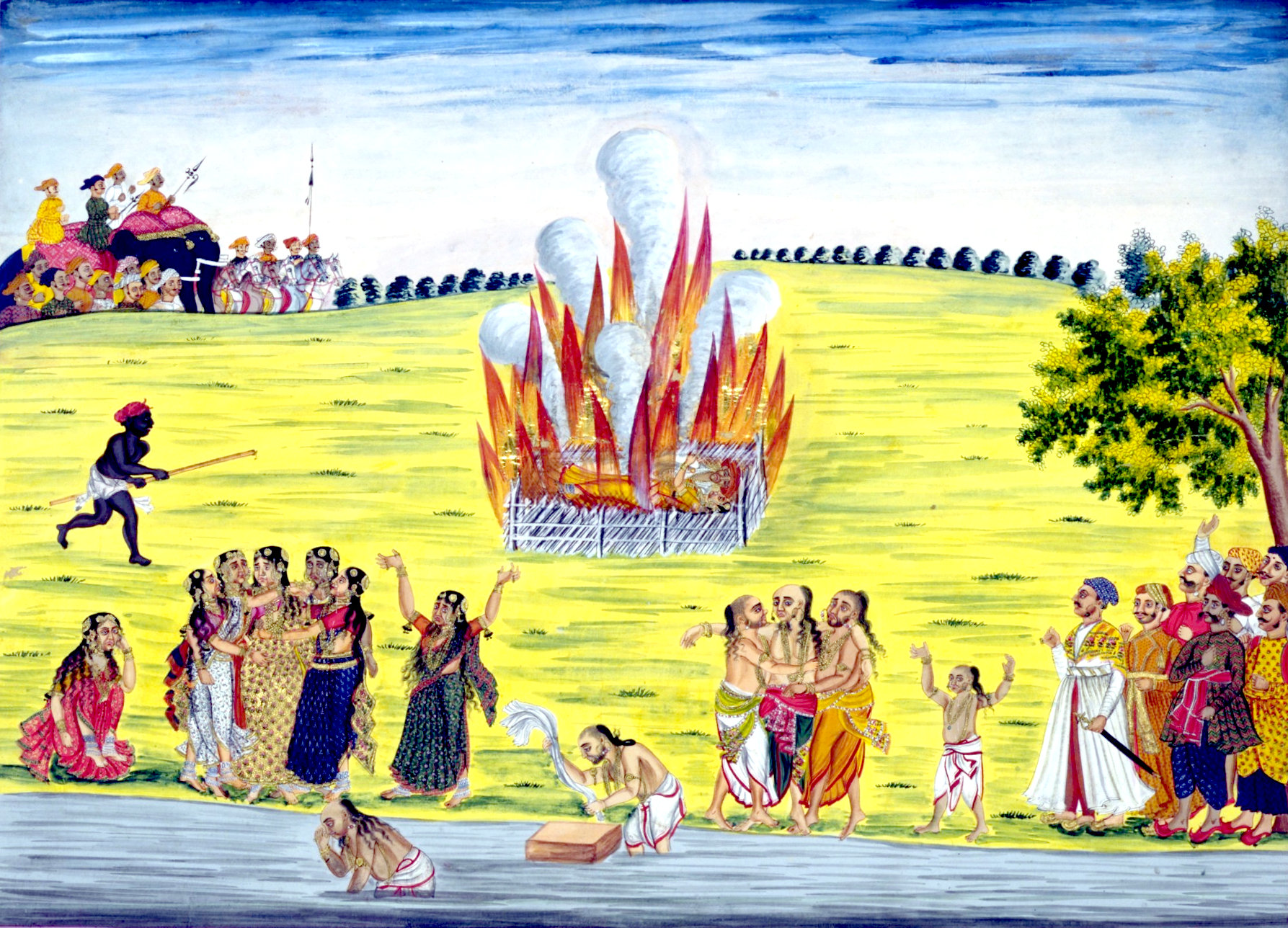
An 18th-century painting depicting sati

Sati was a historical northern Hindu practice, in which a widow sacrifices herself by sitting atop her deceased husband's funeral pyre. Vidya Dehejia states that sati was introduced late into the Indian society, and became regular only after 500 CE. The practice became prevalent from 7th century onwards, and declined to its elimination in the 17th century, to then gain resurgence in Bengal in the 18th century. Roshen Dalal postulated that its mention in some of the Puranas indicates that it slowly grew in prevalence from 5th-7th century and later became an accepted custom around 1000 CE among those of higher classes, especially the Rajputs.

According to Dehejia, sati originated within the Kshatriyas (warrior caste) aristocracy, and remained mostly limited to the warrior class among Hindus. Yang adds that the practice was also emulated by those seeking to achieve high status among the royalty and the warriors. The increase of the sati practice may also be related to the centuries of Islamic invasion and its expansion in South Asia. It acquired an additional meaning as a means to preserve the honour of women whose men had been slain, especially with the variant of a mass sati called jauhar, practiced especially among the Rajputs as a direct response to the onslaught they had experienced.

The Mughal Empire (1526–1857) rulers and the Muslim population were ambivalent about the practice, with many Mughal emperors forbidding the practice, and later the European travelers record that sati was not much practiced in the empire. It was notably associated only with elite Hindu Rajput clans in western India, marking one of the points of divergence between the Hindu Rajputs and the Muslim Mughals.

With the onset of the British Raj, opposition against sati grew. The principal campaigners against Sati were Christian and Hindu reformers such as William Carey and Raja Ram Mohan Roy. In 1829, Lord Bentinck issued Regulation XVII, declaring Sati to be illegal and punishable in criminal courts. On 2 February 1830, this law was extended to Madras and Bombay. The ban was challenged by a petition signed by "several thousand... Hindoo inhabitants of Bihar, Bengal, Orissa etc" and the matter went to the Privy Council in London. Along with British supporters, Ram Mohan Roy presented counter-petitions to parliament in support of ending Sati. The Privy Council rejected the petition in 1832, and the ban on Sati was upheld.

== Caste system ==
Human Rights Watch describes the caste system in India as a "discriminatory and cruel, inhuman, and degrading treatment" of over 165 million people. The justification of the discrimination on the basis of caste, which according to HRW is "a defining feature of Hinduism," has repeatedly been noticed and described by the United Nations and HRW, along with criticism of other caste systems worldwide.

The Buddhist practices existed parallel to, but in direct divergence in essence, to the Brahminical beliefs. The former religious dictums held that worldly superiority was not achieved through birth or some unprecedented bias from the god, but from abstinence and patience upheld against the desires of the material. The Brahmins observed that a ranking was a default system that pre-existed at the time of birth, based on the varna and the jāti that divided the best and fortunate to the least fortunate, and then there were the untouchables. The Buddhists maintained this to be a downright altruistic conduct that served but the interests of only a few men, and unfairly. They swore by the belief that all men were born equal, and each found nirvana through ones own trials by self realization.

== Criticism by Western observers ==
Scottish historian James Mill was critical of Indian society, culture, and Hinduism. He criticised Hindus and attributed a number of traits to them such as "indolence, avarice, lack of cleanliness, ignorance, absence of rational thought, insincerity, mendacity, perfidy, and indifference to the feeling of others".

Niccolao Manucci criticised Hinduism and called it "nothing but a confused mixture of absurdities and coarse imaginations, unworthy of the rational man".

Scottish historian Mountstuart Elphinstone heavily criticised Hinduism, believing it was characterised by superstition and priestly despotism of Brahmins.

Albert Schweitzer criticised Hinduism as "a religion of life-negation and a denial of significance to human life and history".

Jon Stewart in his article "Hegel’s Criticism of Hinduism" notes "The conception of the divine is, according to Hegel, the self-conception of a people. Thus what the people regards as the essential aspect of itself, it sees reflected in the divine. The fact that the Hindus revere animals and natural objects is, for Hegel, a demonstration of the fact that they have not yet developed a conception of themselves as something higher than nature. They have not yet managed to conceive of themselves as spirit."

In 2023, Richard Dawkins wrote, "Modi’s BJP is a tragic affront to India’s secular beginnings. Hinduism is at least as ridiculous as Islam. Between them, these two idiotic religions have betrayed the ideals of Nehru and Gandhi."

== Marxist criticism ==
Karl Marx criticised Hinduism and compared it to an "undignified, stagnatory and vegetative life, that . . . in contradistinction . . . rendered murder itself a religious rite in Hindostan". Indian Marxist writer Ranganayakamma criticised the Hindu text Ramayana and added, "The Ramayana favors men; favors the rich, favors the upper castes, and the ruling class. It supports exploitation; it was never a progressive text, not even at the time it was written".

== Criticism by Indian social reformers ==
Guru Nanak criticized Hinduism for not allowing women to read scriptures and he encouraged women to read scriptures. Gopal Hari Deshmukh in his Shatpatre (Hundred letters) criticised the practices, customs and superstitions of Hinduism. He insisted on separating religion from secular professions. Gopal Ganesh Agarkar criticised Hinduism and demanded restructuring of Hindu society.

== See also ==
- Anti-Brahminism
- Hindutva
- Hindu terrorism
- Purushamedha
- Hindutva pseudohistory

== Sources ==
- Dehejia, Vidya (1994), "Comment: A Broader Landscape", in Hawley, John Stratton (ed.), Sati, the Blessing and the Curse, Oxford University Press, ISBN 978-0-19-507774-2
- Sharma, Arvind (2001). Sati: Historical and Phenomenological Essays. Motilal Banarsidass. ISBN 978-81-208-0464-7.
- Yang, Anand A. (2008). "Whose Sati? Widow-Burning in early Nineteenth Century India". In Sarkar, Sumit; Sarkar, Tanika (eds.). Women and Social Reform in Modern India: A Reader. Bloomington, Indiana: Indiana University Press. ISBN 978-0-253-35269-9.
