= Hate speech laws in Denmark =

Hate speech in Denmark is outlawed by § 266b of the penal code, colloquially called the racism paragraph (racismeparagraffen), which outlaws threats, mockery and degradation against groups defined by race, skin colour, nationality, ethnicity, religion or sexual orientation. The law was originally introduced in 1939, prompted by the antisemitism of 1930s Germany, which had spread to Denmark.

The number of charges and convictions under the hate speech law has increased during the 2010s. While there were 24 charges in 2010, the number had doubled to 48 in 2019. The number of convictions rose from 1 to 12 in the same period.

== Wording ==
The racism paragraph appears in chapter 27 (violations of peace and honour) of the penal code:

(1) Anyone who publicly or with the intention of dissemination to a wider group makes a statement or other communication by which a group of persons is threatened, insulted or degraded because of their race, skin colour, national or ethnic origin, religious belief, disability or because of the sexual orientation, gender identity, gender expression or gender characteristics of the group in question, is punished with a fine or imprisonment for up to 2 years.
(2) In determining the punishment, it shall be considered an aggravating factor if the act had characteristics of propaganda.

A corresponding paragraph exists in the Greenlandic penal code as § 100.

== Background ==
The first version of the law stems from 1939, where its purpose was to protect the Danish Jews.:

§ 266 b. Whoever, by spreading false rumours or accusations, persecutes or incites hatred against a group of the Danish population because of its faith, heritage or status of national citizenship, is punished with jail or, under extenuating circumstances, with a fine. If the rumours or accusations have been put forth in printed writing, or by other means by which they have reached a larger circle, the punishment is jail, or under aggravating circumstances, prison up to 1 year.

The wording was changed in 1971, by the incorporation of the UN convention on racial discrimination. The paragraph was expanded to cover sexual orientation in 1987. The subclause stating that propaganda is an aggravating factor was added in 1995.

The 1971 change, whereby the term race was added, was highly controversial. The change was proposed by conservative Minister of Justice Knud Thestrup. Among opponents were MPs Poul Dam (SF) and later Preben Wilhjelm (VS). Poul Dam noted that this would be the first time the Nazi category of "race" gained a place in Danish legislation. Søren Krarup (who would become MP for DF) also opposed the law in general, and specifically the usage of the "vulgar Darwinistic and purely biological" concept of race.

== Accuracy of statements ==
A property of trials under this paragraph is that the accused is not entitled to provide proof for the possible veracity of statements made. In a memo from the national attorney, it is written:

It is noted that the prosecution must oppose any demand on the part of the accused to present proof of the veracity of e.g. accusations of excessive crime. In that context, reference may be made to U2000.2234H, where the Supreme Court stated that there had been no basis for giving the accused access to the desired evidence, which, among other things, was intended to show that the statements of the accused rested on scientific investigations.

The national attorney further writes:

The liability [of the statement] does not depend on whether the group in question has in actuality felt threatened, mocked or degraded. The liability is dependent on a general assessment on whether the relevant statements, in the concrete context, can be considered fit to provoke fear (threats) or have a mocking and/or degrading effect

True statements may be covered by § 266 b. In a commented edition of the particular part of the penal code, Vagn Greve explains that

It is assumed that certain utterings or drawings may seem degrading, even though they are not mocking. The criminalized mockery or degradation may happen through an expression of contempt, ridicule etc., regardless of whether the statement is false or not. Scientifically presented theories and statements that exist within a factual debate are exempt from punishment. (...) There exists a particularly extensive freedom of expression for politicians on controversial societal matters, but this limit can also be crossed.

== Select cases ==
=== Faith and origin ===
==== Mogens Glistrup ====
Mogens Glistrup, founder of Fremskridtspartiet, has been convicted of hate speech thrice. The Supreme Court sentenced him to seven days of suspended prison for aggravated racist statements on TV in 1997, where he referred to Muslims as "criminals of the world" who wanted to subject the Danes to "castration and murder", and stated that "anyone who has studied Mohamedanism knows that they are only here to ingratiate themselves until they are strong enough to execute us". The Supreme Court found this to be an "aggravated mockery and degradation of a population group on the basis of its faith and origin." In 2003, he was sentenced to 20 days of unsuspended prison for, in the context of his reentry into Fremskridtspartiet, having said, among other things, that "Mohamedans should be round up, gathered in camps and sold to the highest bidder". Finally, in October 2004, he was sentenced to 30 days suspended prison at Østre Landsret for statements made at a caucus and in a TV program in 2001.

==== Studiemagasinet and Dansk Folkepartis Ungdom ====
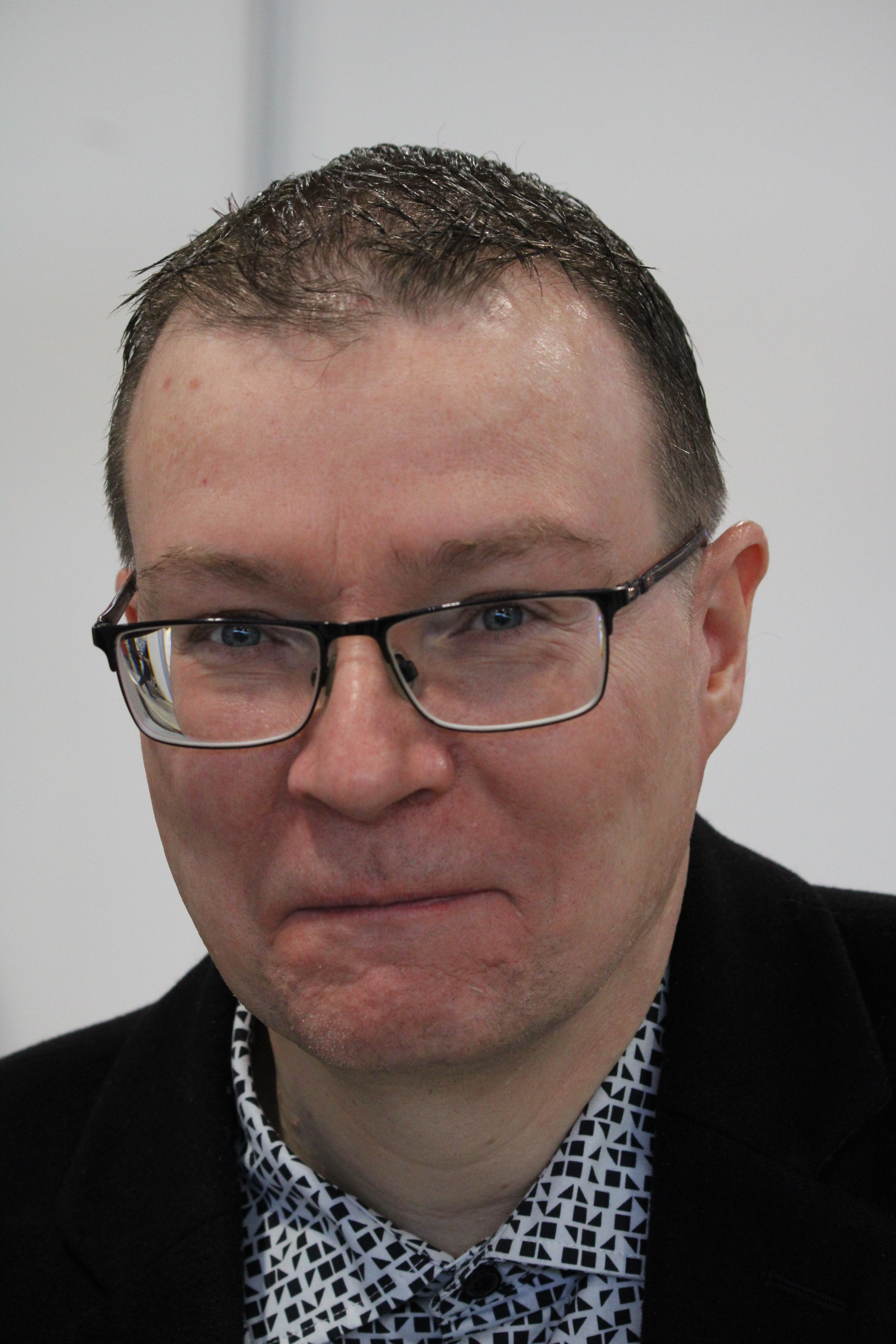
Kenneth Kristensen Berth in 2025

In October 2002, Morten Messerschmidt, Kenneth Kristensen Berth and two other former board members from Dansk Folkeparties Ungdom were sentenced to 7 days' suspended prison violating subsection 1 of § 266. They were, however, acquitted of violating subsection 2. The offending uttering was a 2001 advertisement in Studiemagasinet, with the text: "Mass rape, aggravated violence, insecurity, forced marriages, oppression of women, gang crime. This is what a multiethnic society offers us", accompanied by a picture of three hood-clad, blood-stained individuals presenting the Quran.

An extract of the comments from the court follows:

(...) [T]he message is sent that an identification may be made between faith in the Quran on one hand and mass rape, aggravated violence, insecurity, forced marriages, oppression of women and gang crime on the other. (...) The image very clearly – in part by the central placement of the Quran in the picture – refers to a specific group of people characterized by their faith. The ad and poster hereby present a population group for hatred due to its faith and origin, and the message is highly mocking and degrading to people of Muslim observance.

The two editors of the magazine were each sentenced to five fines of each 500 DKK.

=== Sexual orientation ===
==== Emmy Fomsgaard ====
In 1990, Emmy Fomsgaard was charged for having written in a letter to the editor "is a homophile not a form of thief? Does he not steal his neighbour's honour, and perhaps his life, by exploiting him and perhaps giving him AIDS? Homosex is the most disgusting form of fornication". Fomsgaard was acquitted both in the court of Skjern and in Vestre Landsret, although the judges were split 3–3 in the latter instance. In this context, it was specified that direct quotes from the Bible were not subject to § 266b.

==== Bruno Hollendsted ====
In 2001, Landsforeningen for bøsser og lesbiske reported Bruno Hollendsted, a parliamentary candidate from Kristeligt Folkeparti, for having said: "homosexuality is an abnormal sexual malformation related to pedophilia and necrophilia. This sort of relation is beyond thought – indeed, not even lower primates establish themselves in this manner of living together... I would probably say that homosexuality is a disability.” The report was rejected by the politimester in Aalborg, and later by the state prosecutor.

=== Religion ===
==== Lars Hedegaard ====
In 2010, Lars Hedegaard was charged for having said, in a 2009 online interview:

"But they rape their own children. And you hear that all the time that girls in Muslim families are raped by their uncles or cousins or their father. There was a recent book that came out in Norway, written by a Somalian girl. It was called "Se oss" ('see us, note us, notice us') – where she talks about conditions of Somali families in Norway. She was raped by her uncle. Her mother and her mother's friends and her father made no protest. Women are basically – how could i describe it – they have no value. They are not human beings. They have a function as wombs. They bear the offspring of the warriors to create new warriors. Other than that, they – well, they can be used for sexual purposes, but they have no value."

Lars Hedegaard was reported by Yilmaz Evcil, vice-chairman of the Integration Committee of Aarhus, and the state prosecutor made the indictment. The case was appealed to the Supreme Court, which unanimously acquitted Hedegaard. The court found that it had not been proven that the statements, which were made in a private setting, were made with intent for publication.

==== Jesper Langballe ====
In 2010, MP Jesper Langballe was sentenced to ten fines of 500 DKK because of an article in Berlingske Tidende on 22 January 2010. Under the header "Islam's benighted view of women", he had written "Of course Lars Hedegaard shouldn't have said that there are Muslim fathers who rape their daughters, when the truth instead seems to be that they make do with killing the daughters (the so-called honour killings) – and furthermore turn a blind eye to the rape of uncles."

==== Hizb ut-Tahrir ====
In 2002, Hizb ut-Tahrir printed pamphlets reading:

"And kill them wherever you find them, and expel them from whence they expelled you. (...) The Jews are a slanderous people, and they are a people that betray, break promises and pacts, make up lies and twist words from the right context, they unjustly take away rights, and they have killed prophets and kill innocent people, and they are most brutal in their enmity towards the Muslims, and Allah has forbidden us from taking them as loyal friends."

The first sentence was a quote from the Quran. The spokesman of the Danish chapter, Fadi Abdullatif, was sentenced to 60 days' suspended prison in October 2002.

==== Firoozeh Bazrafkan ====
In a 2011 blog entry on the website of Jyllandsposten, the Iranian-born artist and blogger Firoozeh Bazrafkan wrote among other things:

“… I am very convinced that Muslim men to a very great extent across the world both rape, mistreat and kill their daughters. In my opinion as a Danish-Iranian, this is due to a defective, misanthropic culture – if it is even a culture? But one may say that my opinion is that this is a defective, misanthropic religion, whose textbook, the Quran, is, if possible, even more immoral, despicable and insane than the manuals of the other two world religions put together."

Firoozeh Bazrafkan was sentenced to a fine in October 2012 due to an assessment by lawyers at Aarhus Police, but acquitted at the Aarhus court. However, on 16 September 2013, she was again sentenced to a fine by Vestre Landsret. The statement was a quote from another person who was convicted of hate speech. The sentencing states:

"In forming the blog entry, the accused has not only referred to a former statement, but made the remarks about rape, mistreatment and killing her own. By letting the entry remain on the blog, the accused has intentionally presented statements to the public whereby a group of persons are mocked and degraded because of their faith. We therefore find the accused guilty of the charge."

==== Facebook-joke ====
On 17 August 2015, the court of Odense acquitted a 29-year-old man and 19-year-old woman for having shared a joke about Muslims on Facebook. The joke went:

- Mo-om! Why do we not eat monkeys?
Because we're related to them!
- Is that why Muslims don't eat pork?

The court neither found the joke to violate the law, nor that the accused had intent for propagating in a wider circle.

==== Mogens Camre compares Muslims to Nazis ====
On 18 August 2015, Mogens Camre was sentenced to ten fines of 800 DKK in a 2–1 decision for having tweeted, on 24 July 2014, "On the situation of the Jews in Europe: The Muslims continue where Hitler ended. Only the treatment Hitler received will change the situation". Mogens Camre immediately appealed. After the sentencing, Søren Espersen stated that the conviction would have no consequences for Camre's membership of DF. On 1 February 2016, Østre Landsret upheld the sentence.

=== Race ===
==== Rasmus Paludan ====
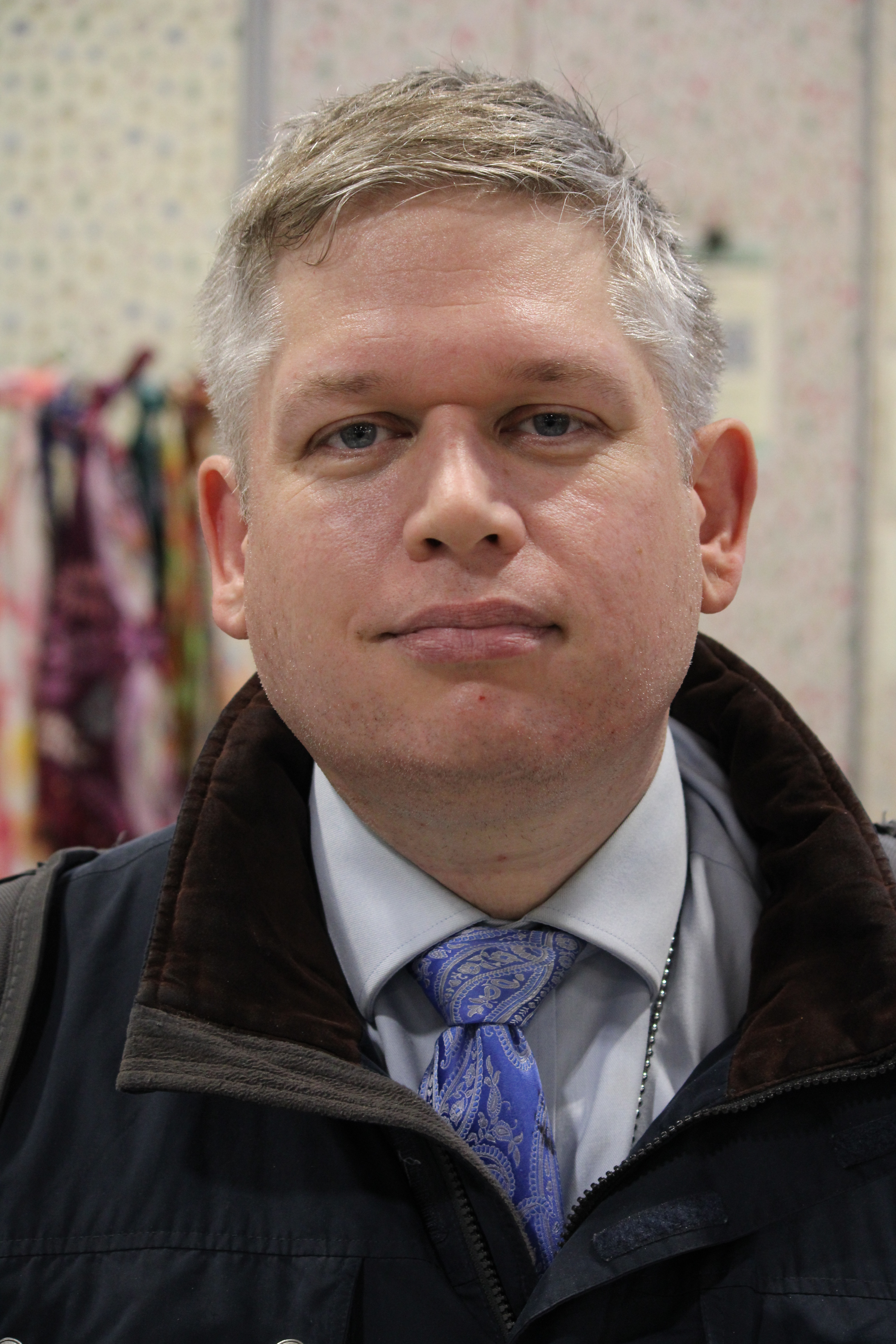
Rasmus Paludan in 2025

In April 2019, Rasmus Paludan was given 14 days' of suspended prison in Glostrup for statements made about Africans in a YouTube video posted on 2 April 2018. According to the prosecution, he said among other things:

"Well, when one, like Bwalya Sørensen, and most black people in South Africa, is too unintelligent to see the true state of things, then it is much easier to only see in black and white, and, as said, blame the white."

The court further deemed the video to be propagandistic, an aggravating circumstance. Paludan appealed the sentence to Østre Landsret, which upheld it on 4 July 2019.

B.T. reported that the defense attempted to "document that academic discussions have taken place over many years in Danish and foreign universities about the levels of intelligence of different countries", and to give the impression that "it must be considered fully legal to debate these issues politically". After the sentencing, the prosecutor stated that "these were not utterings within freedom of expression, and one cannot say that it is covered by objective debate. It is clearly beyond that limit".

== Faroe Islands ==
On 15 December 2006, the Lagting decided to add sexual orientation to the corresponding §266(b) of the Faroese penal code, a change that had been made to the Danish code in 1987. This amendment was strongly debated in the Faroese society, and votes had previously been equal in the Lagting, but it won in the final vote 17–15.

== See also ==
- Censorship in Denmark
- Freedom of speech in Denmark
- Hate speech laws by country
