= Free Press Society =

The Free Press Society may refer to:

- The Danish Free Press Society
- The International Free Press Society
