= Freedom of speech in Denmark =

Freedom of speech and freedom of the press in Denmark are ensured by § 77 of the constitution:

Anyone is entitled to in print, writing and speech to publish his or hers thoughts, yet under responsibility to the courts. Censorship and other preventive measures can never again be introduced.

There's widespread agreement in Danish legal theory that § 77 protects what is called "formal freedom of speech" (formel ytringsfrihed), meaning that one cannot be required to submit one's speech for review by authorities before publishing or otherwise disseminating it. However, there is disagreement about whether or not § 77 covers "material freedom of speech" (materiel ytringsfrihed), the right to not be punished for ones speech. There is agreement that the phrasing "under responsibility to the courts" gives legislators some right to restrict speech, but conversely, there have been several court decisions implying that some material freedom of speech does exist. The discussion is about whether the material speech has limits or not, and if so, what those limits are.

The major punishable acts are child pornography, libel, and hate speech/racism, which are restricted by the Danish penal code. Like most other countries, Denmark also forbids publishing classified material harmful to state security, copyright-protected material without permission, and revealing trade secrets in the civil law.

In 2004, 2005, and 2009 Denmark received a joint first place in the Worldwide Press Freedom Index from Reporters Without Borders. Since 2011, Denmark has consistently been in the top-10 out of 179 countries in the index and it was fourth in 2016. It has, however, performed worse in indices measuring academic freedom to Danish universities and researchers.

== Child pornography ==
The provision against child pornography are set down in §§ 235 and 230 of the penal code:

- § 235. Dissemination of obscene photographs or films, other obscene visual reproductions, or similar depictions of persons under 18.
- § 230. Taking indecent photographs, films, etc. of a person under 18 with intent to sell or otherwise disseminate.

== Libel ==
The provision against libel is set down in § 267 of the penal code:

Anybody who offends another person's honor by insulting words or actions or by stating or disseminating charges that are suitable for reducing the insulted person in the esteem of fellow citizens, will be punished by fine or ordinary imprisonment.

— § 267 of the Danish penal code

== Blasphemy ==
For 151 years, up until the middle of 2017, blasphemy was forbidden by § 140 of the penal code:

Anybody who publicly mocks or insults the religious doctrine or worship of any religious community lawfully existing in this country will be punished by fine or imprisonment for up to 4 months

— § 140 of the Danish penal code prior to its repeal in 2017

The law was rarely used by prosecutors, however. In 1997, a Danish artist burned a copy of the Bible on a TV news show broadcast by the publicly funded Danish Broadcasting Corporation. The artist was never charged with blasphemy. Only two people were ever convicted under the law during its lifetime and from 2007 to 2017, only 4 complaints of violating the law were reported to law enforcement. Bills repealing the law had been proposed multiple times, but none were successful until 2017 when the first prosecution since 1971 was filed against a man for posting a video of him burning the Quran on Facebook, reigniting the debate over the law. Parliament voted to repeal the law, with 8 of the 9 parties in the Folketing supporting the repeal.

== Hate speech and racism ==
The rules against hate speech and racism are set down in § 266b of the Danish penal code:

Whoever publicly, or with intention to disseminating in a larger circle makes statements or other pronouncement, by which a group of persons is threatened, derided or degraded because of their race, colour of skin, national or ethnic background, faith or sexual orientation, will be punished by fine or imprisonment for up to 2 years. Sec. 2. When meting out the punishment it shall be considered an especially aggravating circumstance, if the count has the character of propaganda.

— § 266b of the Danish penal code

Free speech advocate Lars Hedegaard was prosecuted under this statute for remarks made to a blogger in December 2009 criticizing Islam. He was first acquitted in the District Court in January 2011, then convicted upon appeal to the High Court in May 2011, and finally acquitted by the Danish Supreme Court in April 2012, which ruled that it could not be proved that he intended for the statements to be published. Danish politician Jesper Langballe pleaded guilty and was convicted of hate speech for comments he made about rape and honour killings in Muslim families in a newspaper article in connection with Hedegaard's case.

== State security ==
In February and March 2004, three Berlingske Tidende journalists, Michael Bjerre, Jesper Larsen, and Niels Lunde, were prosecuted for "harming state security" after publishing the details of classified intelligence reports about the lack of weapons of mass destruction in Iraq. In December 2006 the three were acquitted by a Copenhagen court.

== Flag flying ==
The flying of all flags (including the Danish national flag) by the general public was banned in 1833 (effectively 1834) during the absolute monarchy of Denmark; this ban was later loosened in 1854 to allow foreign ambassadors to fly their own national flags from their residences, as well as allowing anyone to fly the Danish civil flag. In 1915, following a 1914 amendment to the Danish penal code, an executive order was issued, reiterating the aforementioned ban on flying foreign flags but also providing an exception that the police could allow flying a foreign flag on occasion. Several executive orders later allowed the flying of the flags of the Nordic nations, including the Faroe Islands and Greenland (the latter by an act, rather than an executive order).

On 22 June 2023, the Supreme Court of Denmark ruled that the 1915 executive order was not enforceable under Danish law, thus effectively allowing any flag to be flown; the Ministry of Justice subsequently redacted all executive orders relating to the flying of foreign flags.

== Academic Freedom ==
According to the Danish University Act, both institutional and individual academic freedom are protected at Danish universities. In 2017, Denmark ranked 24th out of the 28 EU countries in academic freedom. In a 2024 study, it ranked 32nd out of 179 countries.

According to the union DM, researchers have raised concerns about political criticism or interference in work deemed controversial or politically inconvenient. Precarious employment and limited job security can undermine independence and research quality, especially for early-career scholars. Growing competition for external funding and pressures to demonstrate relevance, innovation and collaboration may constrain the pursuit of basic or curiosity-driven research. In addition, limited awareness and dialogue about academic freedom in the Danish public contributes to its vulnerability.

In 2021, a political campaign in Denmark targeted what critics called “pseudo-research and activism,” culminating in parliamentary resolution V137 on “excessive activism in certain research environments.” Although the resolution introduced no concrete measures, it warned universities to ensure strict academic self-regulation, and some conservative politicians went so far as to demand ministerial intervention, lists of “dangerous” study programs, and even the closure of specific research environments.

Over 3,000 academics signed a petition in Politiken arguing that the resolution constituted an attack on academic freedom and would encourage self-censorship. They also warned that social media had become a venue for intimidation and harassment of researchers during the controversy.

Already in 1986, the Danish state decided to close the education in Sociology at Copenhagen University, on the grounds that the institute "existed in its own self-referential world, produced few publications in international journals, and failed to reflect the pluralism the discipline had to offer". This governmental intervention into what should be taught at universities, and what should not, is controversial to this date. In 2025, Morten Messerschmidt, leader of the Danish People's Party (DF), proposed closing Roskilde University, due to it being "woke" and a "political institution". Danish Politicians from the DF and Liberal Alliance had threatened the university with closure already in 2023.

== See also ==
- Freedom of speech by country
- Censorship in Denmark
