= Censorship in Denmark =

Censorship in Denmark has been prohibited since 1849 by the Constitution:

§ 77: Any person shall be at liberty to publish his ideas in print, in writing, and in speech, subject to his being held responsible in a court of law. Censorship and other preventive measures shall never again be introduced.

This effectively means that published material does not need prior acceptance from a censor before being released, also known as prior restraint. However, child pornography, hate speech, copyright, libel, and state security laws do exist, which means that authors, publishers, and others can be held responsible for statements in publicly disseminated material that violates these laws. Until June 2017, §140 of the Danish penal code (colloquially, blasfemiparagraffen) outlawed blasphemy.

== Internet censorship ==
Internet censorship became a growing issue in Denmark from 2005 with child pornography sites, file-sharing sites such as AllOfMP3 and, more recently, The Pirate Bay, being blocked on the DNS level by ISPs. On 23 December 2008, WikiLeaks released a list of 3,863 sites being filtered in Denmark. However, no evidence of Internet filtering was found by the OpenNet Initiative in 2009. Due to legal issues ONI does not test for filtering of child pornography. In November 2011, the DNS blocking was expanded to include websites selling drugs and unlicensed online gambling sites. The DNS filters can easily be circumvented by simply changing to a different DNS server, such as Google Public DNS, OpenDNS, censurfridns.dk and other similar services.

This situation has been criticised by several organisations and in June 2011 in an open letter a confederation of the Danish IT-business organisations appealed to the Danish government for a revision of this practice and for the institution of clear legislation on the subject.

In 2012 Internet service providers (ISPs) and copyright holders in Denmark agreed on a framework where all ISPs will block access to copyright-infringing content if one of the providers is ordered to do so by a court. The Danish Ministry of Culture plans to work with ISPs and rights holder groups to "formalise" the agreement in a "written Code of Conduct".

== Selected instances ==
In February and March 2004 three Berlingske Tidende journalists, Michael Bjerre, Jesper Larsen, and Niels Lunde, were prosecuted for "harming state security" after publishing the details of classified intelligence reports about the lack of weapons of mass destruction in Iraq. In December 2006 the three were acquitted by a Copenhagen court.

On 18 October 2005 Denmark's biggest Internet service provider TDC A/S launched a DNS-based child pornography filter in cooperation with the state police department and Save the Children, a charity organisation. Since then, all major providers have joined and as of May 2006, 98% of the Danish Internet users were restricted by the filter.

Also, as of 18 October 2005, TDC A/S had blocked Internet access to AllOfMP3.com, a popular MP3 download site, through DNS filtering.

In March 2006, Internet filtering caused some controversy when a legal sex site named Bizar.dk was blocked, sparking discussion about the reliability, accuracy and credibility of the filter.

On 4 February 2008 a Danish court ordered the Danish ISP Tele2 to shut down access to the file-sharing site thepiratebay.org for its Danish users.

Right-wing commentator Lars Hedegaard was prosecuted under the hate speech statute (§ 266b) for remarks made to a blogger in December 2009 criticizing Islam. He was first acquitted in the District Court in January 2011, then convicted upon appeal to High Court in May 2011, and finally acquitted in April 2012 by the Danish Supreme Court, which ruled that it could not be proved that he intended for the statements to be published. Danish politician Jesper Langballe pleaded guilty and was convicted of hate speech for comments he made about rape and honour killings in Muslim families in a newspaper article in connection with Hedegaard's case.

In November 2011 a website selling diet pills, 24hdiet.com, was blocked by Danish ISPs, the first use of a new law on the blocking of foreign websites that sell drugs.

== See also ==
- Freedom of speech and freedom of the press in Denmark
- Hate speech laws in Denmark
