= Langballe =

Langballe is a surname. Notable people with the surname include:

- Christian Langballe (1967–2025), Danish politician
- Jesper Langballe (1939–2014), Danish Lutheran priest, author, and politician
