= International Free Press Society =

Danish organization

- Abbreviation: IFPS
- Formation: 2009
- Founder: Lars Hedegaard
- Type: Freedom of expression advocacy group
- Headquarters: Denmark
- Parent organisation: Danish Free Press Society
- Website: internationalfreepresssociety.wordpress.com

The International Free Press Society (IFPS), founded in 2009, is a creation of the Danish Free Press Society. The stated purpose of IFPS "is to defend freedom of expression wherever and by whomever it is threatened". It has been described as a key component of the counter-jihad movement.

== Overview ==
The IFPS was created as an extension of the Danish Free Press Society, founded in 2004 by Lars Hedegaard among others. According to its own account, the Free Press Society arose because of increasing pressure on free speech, including the Jyllands-Posten Muhammad cartoon crisis. The Free Press Society claims to be "Denmark's biggest organisation exclusively devoted to defending the right of free expression." The society is considered a key component of the counter-jihad movement and in the article The Muslim Conspiracy and the Oslo Massacre Liz Fekete, the executive director of the independent educational charity named Institute of Race Relations, argues that it is an instrument for pushing the boundaries of hate speech.

The International Free Press Society has contact with a range of international critics of Islam who argue that islamisation threatens Freedom of Speech, including Ayaan Hirsi Ali, Ibn Warraq, Daniel Pipes, Geert Wilders, Bruce Bawer and Henryk Broder. It also relays information from other sources, amongst which are the blogs Gates of Vienna and Jihad Watch, which have been characterised as islamophobic.

The Danish Free Press Society, among others, awarded Danish cartoonist Kurt Westergaard the Sappho Award, an award given to a 'journalist who combines excellence in his work with courage and a refusal to compromise'. His editor Flemming Rose is another recipient. As culture editor of Jyllands-Posten he commissioned the Muhammad cartoons, a move that resulted in the chief editor sending him on leave.

== Muslim hate-speech case ==
On 22 December 2009 the Chairman of the Danish Free Press Society, and then member of the Danish People's Party, Lars Hedegaard, gave an interview in which he declared that Muslims "rape their own children. It is heard of all the time. Girls in Muslim families are raped by their uncles, their cousins or their fathers." He also stated that "Whenever it is prudent for a Muslim to hide his true intentions by lying or making a false oath in his own or in Islam’s service, then it is ok to do it."

Fellow party member Søren Krarup said that Hedegaard's remarks were justified, though they could have been more "carefully" stated. He instead blamed the controversy on a "media mafia" whom he accused of distorting Hedegaard's statements. Søren Espersen defended Hedegaard's remarks. Others were more critical, and Hedegaard's interview led to the immediate resignation of three Free Press Society board members: Liberal Party MP Søren Pind the Conservative Party's Integration spokesman Naser Khader and the Lutheran priest Kathrine Lilleør. Vicechairman in the Integration Council in Aarhus Municipality Yilmaz Evcil reported Lars Hedegaard to the police, and the public attorney chose to make a case against him for violating the Danish anti-racism laws. His trial began 24 January 2011. He was acquitted of all charges on 31 January 2011; however, the Eastern Regional Court reversed the acquittal in May 2011. He appealed against the verdict, and in 2012, the Supreme Court acquitted him in a 7-0 decision.

== Organization ==
The Board of Directors includes Lars Hedegaard, Diana West, Paul Beliën (editor of The Brussels Journal), Christine Brim, Bjørn Larsen and Edward S. May (editor of Gates of Vienna). It has national branches in such countries as the United Kingdom, where Paul Weston is or was the President of the English branch. The Board of Advisors includes Bat Ye'or, Andrew Bostom, Rachel Ehrenfeld, Brigitte Gabriel, Frank Gaffney, David B. Harris, Ibn Warraq, Hans Jansen, Ehsan Jami, Philippe Karsenty, Roger Kimball, Ezra Levant, Kenneth Levin, Andrew C. McCarthy, Daniel Pipes, Nidra Poller, Roger Scruton, Kathy Shaidle, Robert Spencer, Martin Mawyer, Mark Steyn, Brad Thor, Bruce Thornton, Allen West, Geert Wilders, Banafsheh Zand-Bonazzi, Sam Solomon, Helle Merete Brix and Stephen Coughlin.

== Gunman attack on Lars Hedegaard ==
On 5 February 2013 it was reported that a gunman had tried to shoot the organization's president, Lars Hedegaard. Hedegaard was not physically harmed. The attack was condemned by Denmark's prime minister Helle Thorning-Schmidt, other leading Danish politicians and Dutch politician Geert Wilders.
