= Lars Hedegaard =

Danish journalist and author

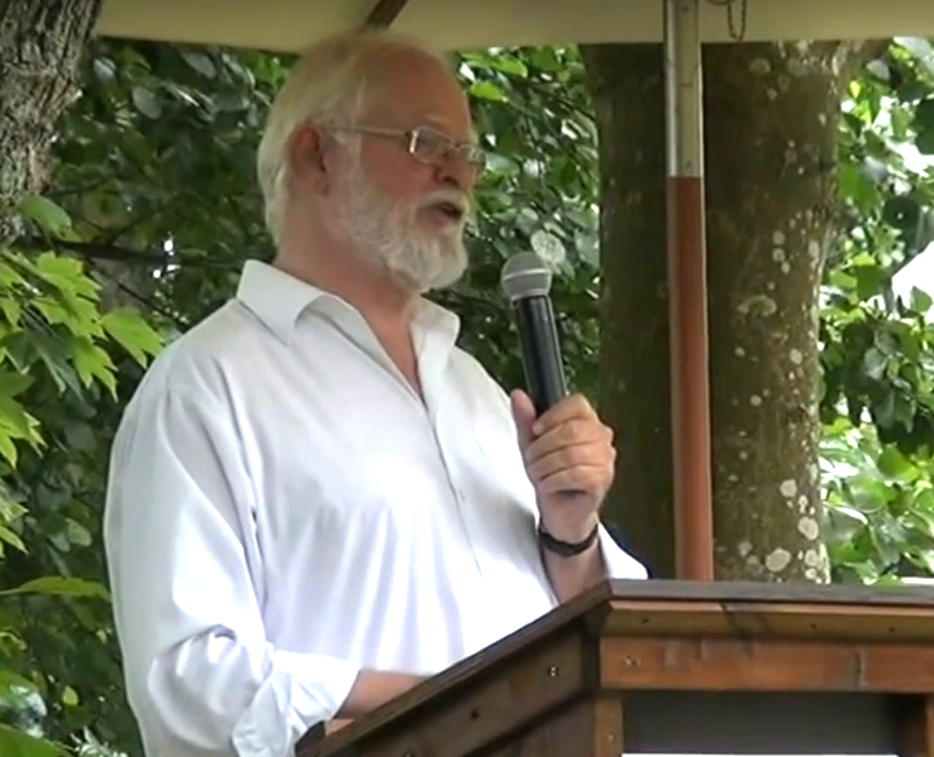
- Hedegaard in 2014
- Born: Lars Hedegaard Jensen; 19 September 1942 (age 84); Horsens, Denmark
- Education: Aarhus University (cand.phil.); University of Copenhagen (cand.mag.)
- Occupations: Author; historian; editor; journalist
- Organisations: Danish Free Press Society; International Free Press Society

Lars Hedegaard Jensen (born 19 September 1942) is a Danish author, historian, editor, journalist and critic of Islam. He established the International Free Press Society in 2009, an extension of the Danish Free Press Society founded in 2004, of which he served as chairman until 2014. Hedegaard was the target of an assassination attempt in 2013, after which he has lived under police protection.

== Career ==
Hedegaard was born in Horsens. He received a cand.phil. degree in history from Aarhus University in 1971, and a cand.mag. in English from the University of Copenhagen in 1973. At first a high school teacher, he later worked as an editorial publisher of Sage Publishing in Los Angeles in the mid-to-late 1970s. He was also one of the editors and driving forces behind the Fundamental historie series of modern history books around the same time. A self-described Marxist, (Note: Hedegaard still considered himself a Marxist in 2008, in the sense that he said he applied Marxist analysis in his writings.) he was politically active as a member of the Trotskyist Socialist Workers Party until 1982. He was the editor of the Politiken publishing house in the early 1980s, and the chief editor of Dagbladet Information in the late 1980s, until he was forced to leave the left-wing newspaper after he helped expose the far-left Blekingegade Gang. He was an editor for the Nordic Council throughout the 1990s, and became part of the satirical editorial column "Groft sagt" for Berlingske Tidende in 1998. He wrote for the column until he was fired from the newspaper in 2008, according to himself because he had been told to stop writing about Islam by a new editor-in-chief, which he refused to do.

=== Criticism of Islam ===
Hedegaard became known as a critic of Islam shortly after the September 11 attacks in 2001. He co-authored the book I krigens hus: Islams kolonisering af Vesten about Islam's "colonisation of the West" in the "house of war" with Helle Merete Brix in 2003, which has been described as a part of the "Eurabia narrative". He founded the Danish Free Press Society in 2004 after Danish PEN objected to admit him as a member due to his writings in I krigens hus, and established the International Free Press Society in 2009, which has been described as a central networking hub for the counter-jihad movement. Hedegaard has been described as a part of the counter-jihad movement, having participated in several of the international counter-jihad conferences held since 2007.

Hedegaard speaking at Mosbjerg Folkefest in 2015 (in Danish)

He was a member of the Danish People's Party, although it was not publicly known, until resigning his membership in 2010 after he had been charged with hate speech. He joined the New Right party in 2016. In 2014 he released an animated film that he co-produced with Pakistani filmmaker Imran Firasat entitled Aisha and Muhammad, which focuses on the life of the fifty-year-old Islamic prophet Muhammad and his marriage to a then six-year-old Aisha. He has also collaborated with Lars Vilks, known for his Muhammad drawings controversy. In 2016, Hedegaard participated in a "counterjihad" panel at the annual Conservative Political Action Conference (CPAC) in the United States, sponsored by Frank Gaffney and the Center for Security Policy.

=== Hate speech trial and acquittal ===
In December 2009, Hedegaard was reported to the police by Yilmaz Evcil of the Århus Municipality integration council for comments made against Muslims. He had made critical remarks against Islamic society, which included "they rape their own children. You hear it all the time. Girls in Muslim families are raped by their uncles, their cousins or their father." He was first acquitted in January 2011 because the statements were made in an interview with the blog Snaphanen that he said he did not know would be publicised publicly. In May the same year, the acquittal was reversed as he was convicted of hate speech under the Article 266b and fined 5,000 kr even as he said that he did not intend to accuse all Muslims of abusing their children. He appealed the second verdict and, in April 2012, the Supreme Court of Denmark acquitted him in a 7–0 decision.

=== Assassination attempt ===
On 5 February 2013, a gunman posing as a mailman attempted to shoot Hedegaard at his home. The gunshot narrowly missed his head, and the assailant escaped after a scuffle after his gun jammed. The Danish Prime Minister Helle Thorning-Schmidt condemned the attack and said the case was even more severe if the motive was to prevent Hedegaard from using his free speech. Danish Muslims responded by rallying to defend Hedegaard and to defend his right to free speech. The Islam Society, which had been heavily involved in the protest against the Jyllands-Posten Muhammad cartoons and helped to publicise their opposition internationally, stated that it regretted its role during the controversy, and the Danish branch of Minhaj-ul-Quran demonstrated outside the City Hall in defence of Hedegaard and free speech.

Since the attack, Hedegaard has been constantly guarded by the Danish Security and Intelligence Service (PET), and has had to live in hiding in a rural place in Denmark on a secret address. He has said that the high rent cost of the highly secured residence offered to him by PET has ruined him financially. He went on a leave of absence as chairman of the Danish Free Press Society after the assassination attempt, and finally left the position to Katrine Winkel Holm in 2014. He wrote a book about the assassination attempt in 2015, titled Attentatet. He was thereafter charged with naming the suspected shooter in his book against a court prohibition, and in 2016 sentenced to a fine of 10,000 kr.

In November 2016, the US State Department issued a note, designating three persons as terror-operatives, one of whom was Basil Hassan, an external operations plotter for the Islamic State of Iraq and the Levant (ISIL), who was accused of having attempted to shoot Hedegaard. Hassan was said to have been released as part of an alleged exchange for 49 hostages held by ISIL after having been arrested in Turkey in 2014, and was believed to have travelled to Syria to join ISIL after his release. The prohibition on naming Hassan by a Danish court was lifted in December 2016.

=== Memoirs and recognition ===
Hedegaard authored two volumes of memoirs in 2010 and 2011, Verden var så rød, mor, about the period 1942–1980, and Ræven går derude, mor, about the period 1980–2011. He received the Raoul Wallenberg Medal in 2005, and the Defender of Freedom Award and the Niels Ebbesen Medal in 2012. Also in 2012, the Danish Free Press Society published a 302-page Festschrift to Hedegaard, titled Frem for alt frihed: festskrift til Lars Hedegaard, with over twenty-one main contributors, both Danish and international. (Note: The Festschrift was edited by Jens Gregersen, Katrine Winkel Holm, Bent Jensen and Kit Louise Strand, and the full list of contributors included Ayaan Hirsi Ali, Mark Steyn, Bruce Bawer, Sven Ove Gade, Mogens Rukov, Kurt Westergaard, Daniel Pipes, Henrik Gade Jensen, Mikael Jalving, Naser Khader, Roger Scruton, Kasper Støvring, Bent Blüdnikow, Søren Espersen, Wafa Sultan, Hans Hauge, Pia Kjærsgaard, Ibn Warraq, Karen Jespersen, David Gress, Morten Uhrskov Jensen, Lars Vilks, Lone Nørgaard, Søren Krarup, Claes Kastholm Hansen, Phyllis Chesler, Kai Sørlander, Jesper Langballe, Farshad Kholghi, Diana West, Gregorius Nekschot, Niels Thomsen, Jeppe Juhl, Kim Møller, Ulla Nørtoft Hansen and Asger Aamund.)

== Personal life ==
Hedegaard has been married twice. In 1969, he converted to Judaism in connection with his marriage to his first wife, Jewish-American Barbara Levin. Hedegaard has three children and one step-daughter.

== Bibliography ==
- Sådan døde Danmark. Document. 2020. ISBN 9788797006320.
- Fragmenter af Danmarks historie 2020-2031. Document. 2017. ISBN 9788797006306.
- Attentatet. People´sPress. 2015. ISBN 9788771593303.
- Der var et yndigt land - en beretning om truslen mod Danmark. Co-authored with Camre, Mogens; Hasselbalch, Ole. Den Danske Forenings Forlag. 2014. ISBN 9788790183103.
- Den forbudte sandhed. Co-authored with Camre, Mogens. Den Danske Forening. 2013. ISBN 9788790183073.
- Muhammeds piger - vold, mord og voldtægter i Islams Hus. Trykkefrihedsselskabets Bibliotek. 2011. ISBN 9788792417213.
- Ræven går derude, mor: Erindringer: 1980-2011. Trykkefrihedsselskabets Bibliotek. 2011. ISBN 9788792417237.
- Verden var så rød, mor: Erindringer: 1942-1980. Trykkefrihedsselskabets Bibliotek. 2010. ISBN 9788792417145.
- Frihedens væsen: Fra Perikles til Hirsi Ali. Co-edited with Jalving, Mikael. Trykkefrihedsselskabets Bibliotek. 2009. ISBN 9788792417077.
- 1400 års krigen: islams strategi, EU og frihedens endeligt. Co-authored with Camre, Mogens. Trykkefrihedsselskabets Bibliotek. 2009. ISBN 9788792417060.
- Groft sagt: Lars Hedegaards 100 bedste. Trykkefrihedsselskabets Bibliotek. 2009. ISBN 9788792417015.
- I krigens hus: Islams kolonisering af Vesten. Co-authored with Brix, Helle Merete; Hansen, Torben. Hovedland. 2003. ISBN 9788777396717.
- Temaer til tiden, bind 1. Co-authored with Lerche Nielsen, Jørgen. Gyldendal Uddannelse. 1997. ISBN 8700287822.
- Bosnia and the West: a hearing 15-16 January 1996. Det Udenrigspolitiske Selskab. 1996.
- En nordisk mening med Europa. Foreningen Norden. 1994. ISBN 8787635038.
- Det sterke Norden i et regionalisert Europa. Co-authored with Veggeland, Noralv. Vett & Viten. 1994. ISBN 9788241201523.
- Regionalpolitikken utfordres. Co-authored with Lindström, Bjarne; Veggeland, Noralv. NordREFO. 1992. ISBN 9788750030775.
- Politikens Ruslandshistorie, bind 1-3. Politikens Forlag. 1986.
- Fundamental historie: Krise og opbrud: tiden 1945-84. Gjellerup & Gad. 1984. ISBN 8713031880.
- Hvem-Hvad-Hvor 1984. Politikens Forlag. 1983. ISBN 8756738315.
- Fundamental historie. Den permanente krise. Tiden 1962-79. Gad. 1979. ISBN 8712228052.
- Fundamental historie. Produktion og Samfund: Danmarks og Nordens historie. Gad. 1978.
- Fundamental historie. Den amerikanske Fred. Tiden 1945-62. GEC Gad. 1975.
- Fundamental historie. Fra krig til krig. Tiden 1914-45. GEC Gad. 1974.
- Fundamental historie. Alfabetisk opslagsbog. GEC Gad. 1973.
