= Charb =

French satirist and journalist (1967–2015)

Stéphane Charbonnier
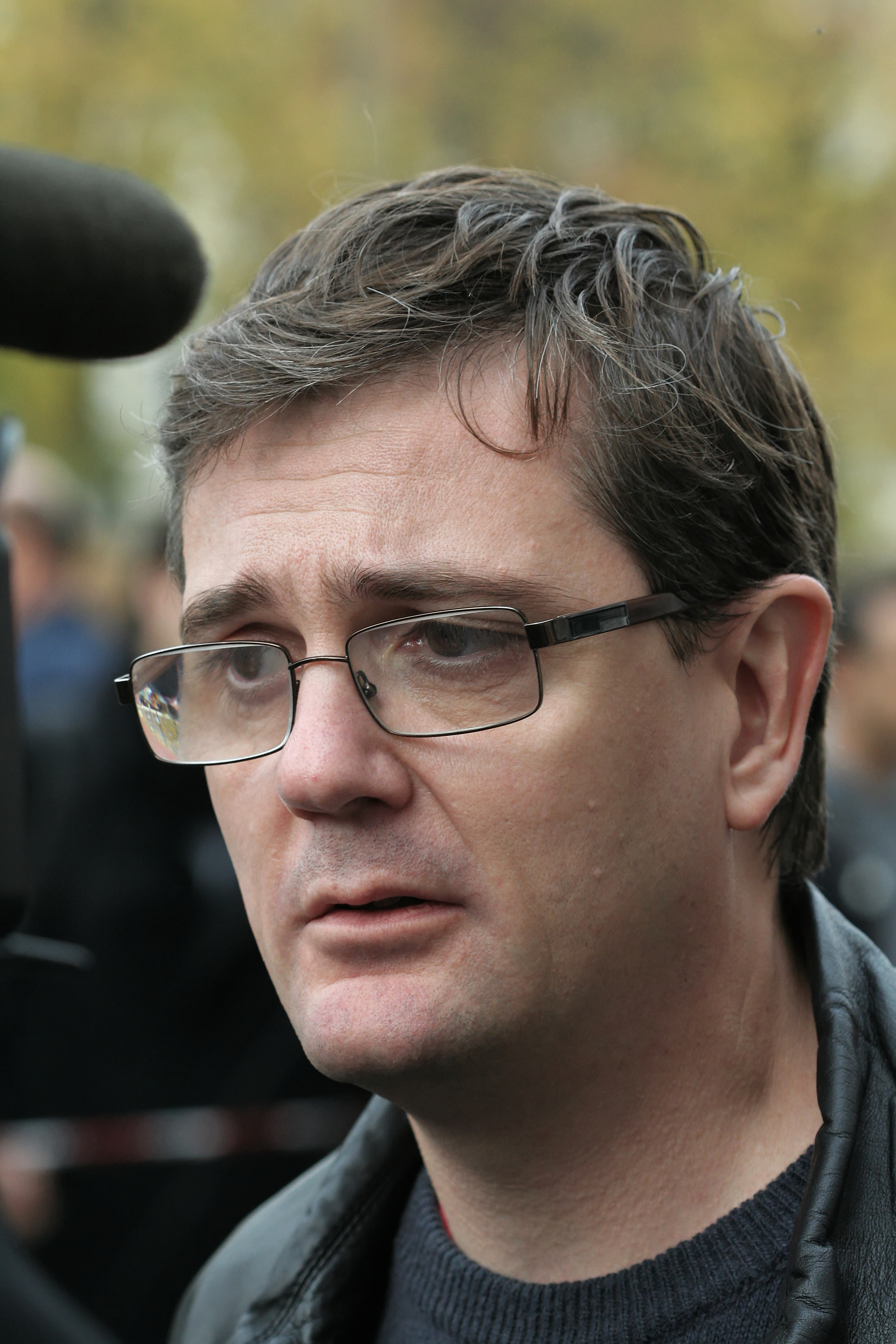
- Charb by the headquarters of Charlie Hebdo in the 20th arrondissement of Paris answering journalists' questions after its firebombing (2 November 2011)
- Born: Stéphane Jean-Abel Michel Charbonnier; 21 August 1967 Conflans-Sainte-Honorine, France
- Died: 7 January 2015 (aged 47) Paris 11^{e}, France
- Areas: Cartoonist, journalist
- Pseudonym: Charb

Signature
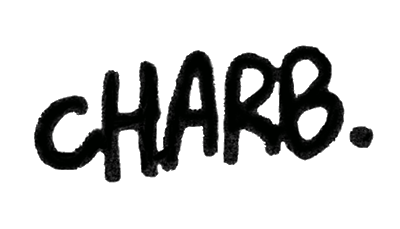

Stéphane Jean-Abel Michel Charbonnier (French: [ʃaʁbɔnje]; 21 August 1967 – 7 January 2015), better known as Charb ([ʃaʁb]), was a French satirical caricaturist and journalist. He was assassinated during the Charlie Hebdo shooting on 7 January 2015.

He worked for several newspapers and magazines, joining Charlie Hebdo in 1992 and becoming the director of publication in 2009. Due to the publication of Muhammad cartoons, Charb became subject to death threats from extremist Muslims. From the time the magazine was firebombed in 2011, he lived under police protection until his assassination. The police officer protecting Charb on 7 January 2015 was also killed by the shooters.

== Early life ==
Stéphane Charbonnier was born in Conflans-Sainte-Honorine on 21 August 1967 and raised in Pontoise, the son of Michel Jean-Marie Charbonnier. His mother, Denise Renée-Marie Charbonnier, née Ouvrard, worked as a secretary and his father worked as a technician for Postes, télégraphes et téléphones. His grandparents, Jean and Lucette Marie-Andrée (née Brunet) owned a grocery store in Pontoise. Stéphane's talent for drawing was discovered in school and he published his first drawings in Echo des collégiens at the age of fourteen. He continued to draw while studying at Lycée Camille Pissarro.

== Career ==
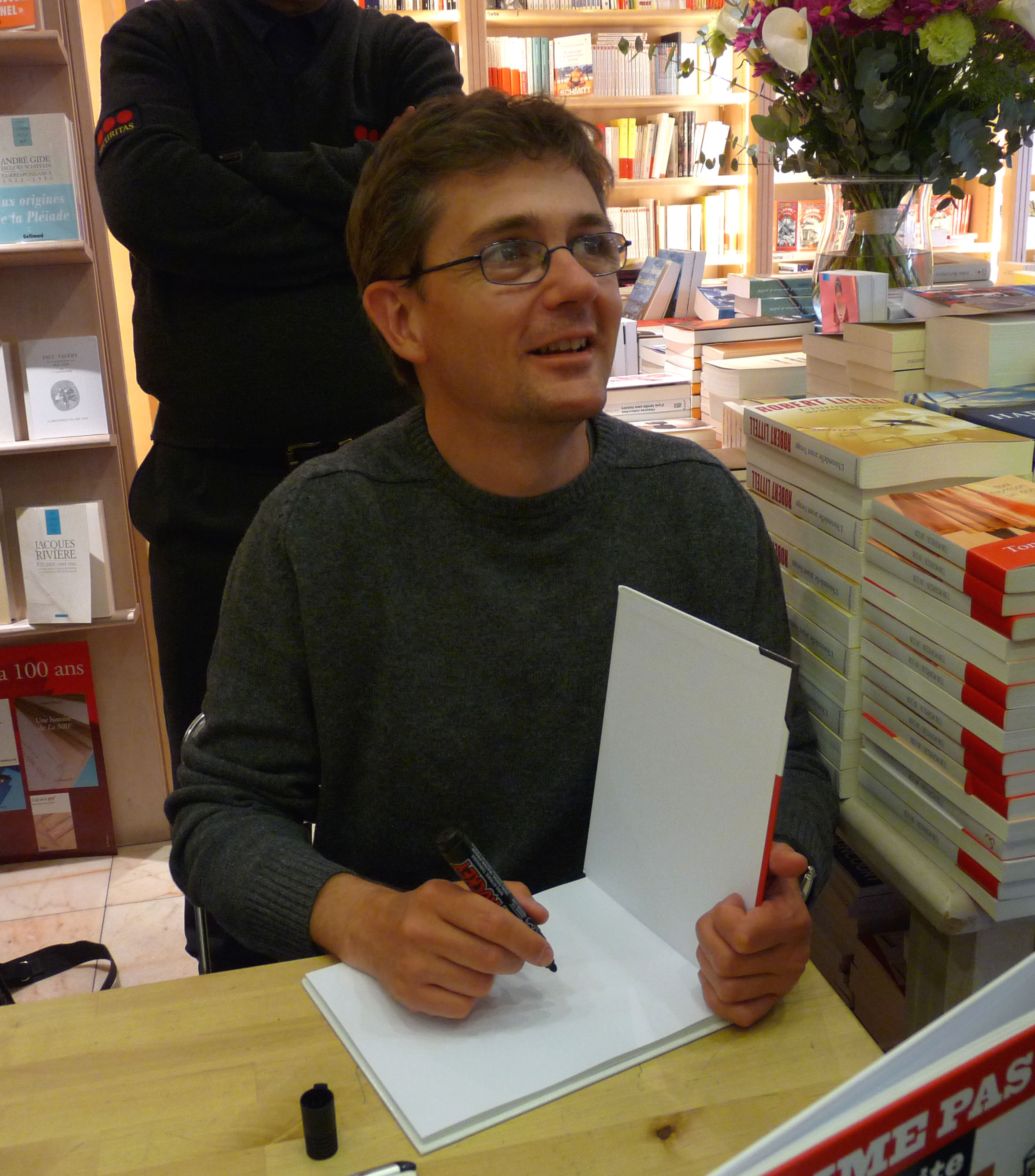
Charb in Strasbourg (29 April 2009)

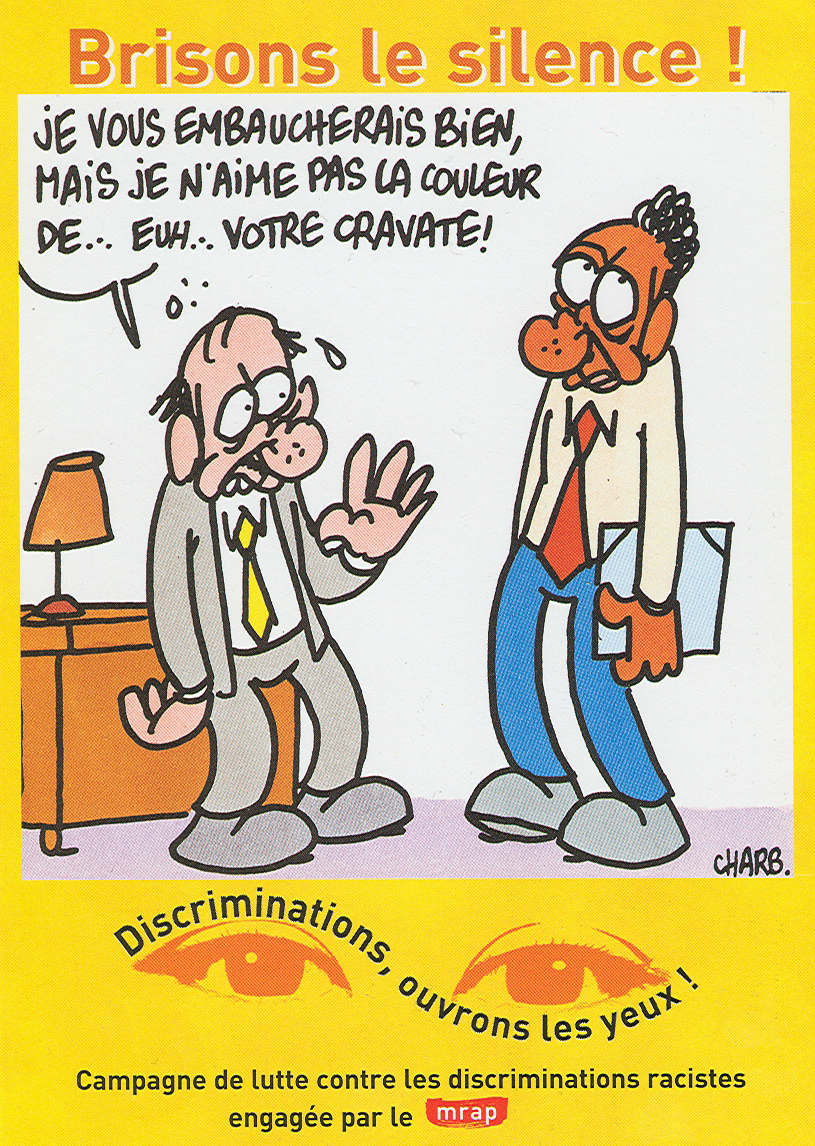
Charb's 2000 MRAP anti-racism campaign poster (translation: "I would hire you, but I don't like the color of ... uh ... your tie!")

In the late 1980s he started working as a cartoonist. His work included creating cartoons for the newspaper Les Nouvelles du Val-d'Oise and a magazine for the Utopia (cinéma) in Saint-Ouen-l'Aumône.

Later freelance work by Charb included cartoons for L'Écho des savanes, Télérama, and L'Humanité. He joined Charlie Hebdo in 1992 and was its director of publication from 2009 until his death on 7 January 2015.

Charb's comic strip, Maurice et Patapon featured Maurice, a dog described by the newspaper Libération as leftist, pacifist, outgoing, and omnisexual, and a cat, Patapon, who is conservative, violent, asexual, and perverse. Libération described the series as philosophical and scatological. Charb also drew the character "Marcel Keuf, le flic" ("Marcel Pig, the cop") in Fluide Glacial. Charb's column in Charlie Hebdo was titled "Charb n'aime pas les gens" ("Charb does not like people"). One of his regular pieces was the monthly La fatwa de l'Ayatollah Charb (The Fatwa of the Ayatollah Charb) in Fluide Glacial.

In 2007 and 2008, he was a set cartoonist on the talk show T'empêches tout le monde de dormir on television channel M6. He was a long-time supporter of the French Communist Party.

He also drew cartoons for anti-racism organizations such as MRAP.

== 2011 bomb attack and subsequent threats ==
On 2 November 2011, Charlie Hebdo was firebombed just before its 3 November issue was due to be published; the issue was entitled Charia Hebdo and satirically featured the Islamic prophet Muhammad as guest-editor. Charb and two of his co-workers at Charlie Hebdo subsequently received police protection.

In September 2012, a man was arrested in La Rochelle, allegedly for having called for the beheading of Charb on a Jihadist website.

In a 2012 interview Charb was quoted as saying, "I am not afraid of reprisals, I have no children, no wife, no car, no debt. It might sound a bit pompous, but I'd prefer to die on my feet than to live on my knees."

In 2013 he illustrated the book "The Life of Muhammad", depicting the Muslim Prophet Muhammad.

Al-Qaeda put Charb on their "most-wanted list" in 2013, after he edited an edition of Charlie Hebdo that satirised radical muslims. Also on that list was Lars Vilks, as well as three Jyllands-Posten staff members: Kurt Westergaard (whose cartoons Charlie Hebdo had published), Carsten Juste, and Flemming Rose. Being a sport shooter, Charb applied for permit to be able to carry a firearm for self-defence. The application was, however, not approved.

On the week of the Charlie Hebdo shooting, a Charb illustration in issue for that week observed that there had not been any terrorist attacks in France, with a caricatured armed jihadist fighter turning a customary French phrase to malicious use: "Wait! ... we still have until the end of January to present our wishes" — a reference to the French tradition of offering New Year's greetings until the end of January.

== Beliefs ==
Charbonnier was an atheist and pacifist.

Two days prior to his death, Charb had completed an essay on Islamophobia. One year after the massacre, it was translated to and published in English, with a foreword by Adam Gopnik, under the title Open Letter: On Blasphemy, Islamophobia, and the True Enemies of Free Expression.

== Death ==
Charb was killed, with seven of his colleagues, two police officers, and two other people on 7 January 2015 when a pair of gunmen stormed the Charlie Hebdo newspaper offices in Paris. One of the police officers killed, Franck Brinsolaro, was Charb's bodyguard.

His funeral was held in Pontoise and included speeches by Luz, Patrick Pelloux, Jean-Luc Mélenchon, and Pierre Laurent. The government ministers Christiane Taubira, Najat Vallaud-Belkacem, and Fleur Pellerin also attended the funeral.

== Personal life ==
Jeannette Bougrab, a human rights attorney and former Minister for Youth and Community Life, indicated after his death that she had been Charb's life partner. His family disputed this and, in a statement issued by his brother on 10 January 2015, denied the existence of any "interpersonal commitment" between Charb and Jeannette Bougrab while, on the other side, several of his colleagues confirmed the relationship between Charb and Jeanette Bougrab.

== Publications ==
- Je suis très tolérant, MC Productions/Charb, 1996
- Maurice et Patapon, Volumes I (2005) II (2006), III (2007), IV (2009), Hoebeke
- Attention ça tache, Casterman, 2004 (with foreword by Philippe Geluck)
- Charb n'aime pas les gens : chroniques politiques, 1996–2002, Agone, 2002
- Collectif, Mozart qu'on assassine, Albin Michel, 2006, with Catherine Meurisse, Riss, Luz, Tignous et Jul
- J'aime pas les fumeurs, Hoëbeke, 2007
- J'aime pas la retraite, 2008 (with Patrick Pelloux)
- C'est la Faute à la société, 12 bis, 2008
- Dico Sarko, éditions 12 bis, 2008
- Le Petit Livre rouge de Sarko, 12 bis, 2009
- Eternuer dans le chou-fleur et autres métaphores sexuelles à travers le monde, text by Antonio Fischetti, Les Échappés, 2009
- Marx, mode d'emploi, La Découverte, 2009 (with Daniel Bensaïd)
- Le Cahier de vacances de Charlie Hebdo, Les Échappés, 2009, with Catherine Meurisse, Riss and Luz|Luz
- Les Fatwas de Charb, Les Échappés, 2009
- C'est pas là qu'on fait caca! Maurice et Patapon for children, Les Échappés, 2010
- Les dictons du jour, agenda 2011, Les Échappés, 2010
- Sarko, le kit de survie, 12 bis, 2010
- Marcel Keuf, le flic, Les Échappés, 2011
- La salle des profs, 12 bis, 2012
- La vie de Mahomet, Les Échappés, 2013 (with Zineb)
- Lettre aux escrocs de l'islamophobie qui font le jeu des racistes, éditions Les Échappés, Lettre A, 2015 (postum)
- Illustrations for Petit cours d'autodéfense intellectuelle (Short class in Intellectual Self-Defence) by Normand Baillargeon, and Petit cours d'autodéfense en économie (éditions Lux; Short Class in Economic Self-Defence) by Jim Stanford.
- Open Letter: On Blasphemy, Islamophobia, and the True Enemies of Free Expression (foreword by Adam Gopnik), Little, Brown, & Co., 2016 ISBN 9780316311335

== See also ==
- List of journalists killed in Europe
