= Katrine Winkel Holm =

Danish theologian (born 1970)

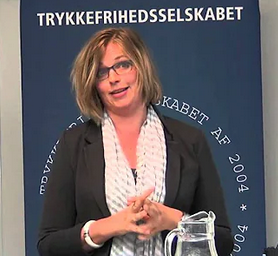
- Winkel Holm in 2014
- Born: Katrine Krarup; 21 March 1970 (age 55)
- Education: University of Copenhagen (cand.theol.)
- Occupations: Theologian; author; priest
- Children: 3
- Relatives: Søren Krarup (father); Marie Krarup (sister)

Katrine Winkel Holm (née Krarup; born 21 March 1970) is a Danish theologian, priest and author. She co-founded the Danish Free Press Society in 2004, of which she became deputy chairman, and later chairman from 2014 until 2018. She has been a member of the board of Danish state broadcaster DR since 2006.

== Biography ==
Winkel Holm grew up in Seem, and is a daughter of priest and politician Søren Krarup and historian Elisabeth Krarup. She received a cand.theol. (Master of Theology) from the University of Copenhagen in 1997, and has along with her father been connected to the theological movement Tidehverv, and a member of the Danish People's Party.

She co-founded the Danish Free Press Society with Lars Hedegaard in 2004, and the Islam-Critical Network in 2006 following the Jyllands-Posten Muhammad cartoons controversy, both described as counter-jihad organisations. The latter was a network of priests in the Church of Denmark which stated that Christians and Muslims do not believe in the same God. She became chairman of the Danish Free Press Society in 2014 after Hedegaard had been subjected to an assassination attempt, and has previously been the editor of its online magazine Sappho.dk. She left the position as chairman to Aia Fog in 2018. She has also blogged for Jyllands-Posten, and written numerous newspaper debate articles, including for Document.no, where she has lauded Bruce Bawer's defence of counter-jihad blogger Fjordman among others.

She became parish priest in Borup in 2015, and in 2023 in Slagelse. She is married and has three children.

== Bibliography ==
- Det Gamle Testamente som teologisk problem. Museum Tusculanum Press. 2000. ISBN 978-8772896113.
- Og Gud velsignede dem: fire essays om kirke, kærlighed og ægteskab. Aros. 2005. ISBN 978-8770036016.
- Rend mig i kødgryderne: om kvinderne og det fælles liv. Gyldendal. 2010. ISBN 978-8702100372.
