= Marie Krarup =

Danish politician (born 1965)

Member of the Folketing
- Incumbent
- Assumed office 15 September 2011
- Constituency: South Jutland

Personal details
- Born: 6 December 1965 (age 60) Seem, Denmark
- Party: Independent
- Other political affiliations: Danish People's Party (until 2022)
- Relatives: Søren Krarup (father); Katrine Winkel Holm (sister)

Marie Krarup Soelberg (born 6 December 1965) is a Danish politician, who is a member of the Folketing for the Danish People's Party. She was elected into parliament in the 2011 Danish general election.

== Political career ==
Krarup was elected to parliament in the 2011 election, where she received 1,659 votes. This was enough for one of the Danish People's Party's levelling seats. She was reelected in 2015, receiving 2,436 votes, winning a direct seat into parliament. She was elected again in 2019, where she received 1,618 votes. She left the party in February 2022, following an internal dispute in the party about the recently elected chairman Morten Messerschmidt.

In April 2013 Krarup in New Zealand called the Pōwhiri, a traditional Māori greeting, "grotesque". Colin Craig, leader of New Zealand's New Conservatives Party, sided with her statement by saying no visitor should have to face a "bare-bottomed native making threatening gestures" if they did not want to.

== Bibliography ==
- Ny kold krig – Marie Krarup taler med 17 eksperter fra øst til vest (2018)
