= Basil Hassan =

- Born: 1987 (age 38–39)
- Organisation: Islamic State of Iraq and the Levant

Basil Hassan (born 1987) is a Danish external operations plotter for the Islamic State of Iraq and the Levant (ISIL). In 2013, Hassan was accused of attempting to shoot Lars Hedegaard, a 70-year old Danish author and journalist. After being arrested in Turkey in 2014, he was released as part of an alleged exchange for 49 hostages held by the ISIL. After his release, Hassan was believed to have travelled to Syria to join ISIL. In November 2016, the US State Department issued a note, designating three persons as terror operatives. He was in 2020 reported to be the mastermind of a failed attempt to blow up a long distance airliner, in what was later cited as the most ingenious ISIS terror project.

== Background ==
Hassan grew up in Greve, Denmark, where he lived until he moved with his family to Nørrebro in Copenhagen around 2000. He began studying at the Frederiksberg Gymnasium in 2003, during which time he started socialising with known extremists. In 2007, one of his friends were convicted for terrorism in the Glostrup Terrorists Case.
