= Knud Ejler Løgstrup =

Danish philosopher and Lutheran theologian (1905–1981)

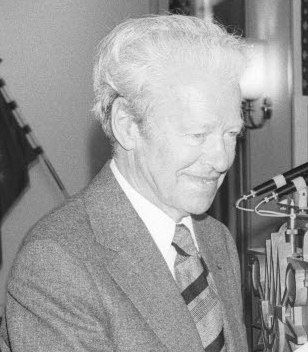
- Løgstrup in 1979
- Born: 2 September 1905; Copenhagen, Denmark
- Died: 20 November 1981 (aged 76)
- Awards: Søren Gyldendal Prize (1959)

Academic work
- Institutions: University of Aarhus

Knud Ejler Løgstrup (2 September 1905 – 20 November 1981) was a Danish philosopher and Lutheran theologian. His work, which combines elements of phenomenology, ethics and theology, has exerted considerable influence in postwar Nordic thought. More recently, his work has been discussed by prominent figures in anglophone philosophy and sociology such as Alasdair MacIntyre, Robert Stern, Simon Critchley and Zygmunt Bauman.

== Biography ==
Løgstrup studied theology at the University of Copenhagen between 1923 and 1930, though his interests tended towards the philosophical aspects of the discipline. He subsequently studied under a number of prominent teachers in Strasbourg (Jean Hering), Paris (Henri Bergson), Göttingen (Hans Lipps and Friedrich Gogarten), Freiburg im Breisgau (Martin Heidegger), Vienna (Moritz Schlick) and Tübingen. Lipps, in particular, would have a particularly marked influence on Løgstrup's thinking. Though Løgstrup was at Strasbourg when Emmanuel Levinas – to whom his work is often compared – was a student there, there is no evidence to suggest he and Levinas encountered one another.

In Freiburg, he met Rosemarie Pauly (1914–2005), a German fellow student whom he married in 1935. The following year he took up a position as a parish priest in Funen and continued to work on his dissertation, a critique of idealist epistemology. The dissertation was finally accepted in 1942 after several submissions. In 1943, he was appointed Professor of Ethics and Philosophy at the University of Aarhus. Shortly thereafter, however, Løgstrup was forced to go underground due to his activities in support of the Danish resistance.

From the 1930s, Løgstrup was a member of Tidehverv, a strongly anti-pietist movement within the Danish Church which at the time espoused a dialectical theology heavily influenced by Kierkegaard. However he drifted increasingly further from the group (and from its interpretation of Kierkegaard, particularly as espoused by Kristoffer Olesen Larsen) and broke with the movement in the early 1950s.

Løgstrup retired from the University of Aarhus in 1975 but continued writing a four-volume work, Metaphysics. Two volumes had been published by the time of his sudden death from a heart attack in 1981.

== Work ==
=== The Ethical Demand ===
Løgstrup's 1956 book The Ethical Demand (Den Etiske Fordring) develops an account of a demand Løgstrup takes to be built into our experience of life with other people:

Trust is not of our own making; it is given. Our life is so constituted that it cannot be lived except as one person lays him or herself open to another person and puts him or herself into that person's hands either by showing or claiming trust. By our very attitude to another we help to shape that person's world. By our attitude to the other person we help to determine the scope and hue of his or her world; we make it large or small, bright or drab, rich or dull, threatening or secure. We help to shape his or her world not by theories and views but by our very attitude towards him or her. Herein lies the unarticulated and one might say anonymous demand that we take care of the life which trust has placed in our hands.

Because we are in a position to influence, to some degree, how well another person's life goes for them (even in very minor ways), we find ourselves in a position of power over them, and "Because power is involved in every human relationship, we are always in advance compelled to decide whether to use our power over the other for serving him or for serving ourselves." For Løgstrup, the demand built into our dealings with others is that we act one-sidedly for the other's sake, not our own: "everything which an individual has opportunity to say and do in relation to the other person is to be done and said not for his own sake but for the sake of him or her whose life is in his hand." This demand ultimately turns out to be unfulfillable for Løgstrup in the sense that "what is demanded is that the demand should not have been necessary." In other words, in any given situation where the ethical demand becomes salient, the agent has already failed to live up to it; the agent should simply have acted spontaneously with selfless concern for the other.

Løgstrup takes the ethical demand to be prior to social norms or moral principles. Such principles and norms cannot simply be ignored, and they may make us act as we would have done had we realized the ethical demand; for that reason they are morally useful. But ultimately they are only a substitute for genuinely realizing the ethical, not constitutive of doing so as mainstream moral philosophy assumes. The Ethical Demand contains analyses of concrete phenomena such as trust, which Løgstrup takes to be fundamental to moral life. Trust, for Løgstrup, is conceptually prior to distrust: the basic attitude built into discourse is a trust in the sincerity of the interlocutor, and hence it is only gradually that we learn to distrust others.

=== Subsequent work ===
In the decades following The Ethical Demand Løgstrup continued to develop his 'ontological ethics' as an alternative to the standard deontic, utilitarian and virtue ethics frameworks. He continued to insist that while virtues, character traits, and duties could usefully provide 'substitute' motives for moral action, these were always secondary: the ethical demand requires a spontaneous loving response to the other. Systems of norms only come into play in moral action when this spontaneous response has already failed.

Consequently, Løgstrup is critical of the emphasis on rule-following and universal principles in most anglophone moral theory. As an example, Løgstrup mentions Stephen Toulmin's example of an everyday situation: 'I have borrowed a book from John and the question is now, why should I give it back today as I promised him?' According to Toulmin, this question will push us to reflect on principles of ever-higher levels of abstraction: "I should always keep my promises," "I should never lie" etc. For Løgstrup, this increasing universalisation leads to a 'moralism' that abstracts from the concrete situation and the needs of the actual person. Instead, moral reflection should remain on the level of the given situation: 'Because my friend needs the book back!'

== Translated works ==
- K.E. Løgstrup. Metaphysics. Marquette University, Milwaukee, 1995. translated and with an introduction by Russell L. Dees. ISBN 0-87462-603-X.
- K.E. Løgstrup. The Ethical Demand. University of Notre Dame Press, Notre Dame, 1997. 1st Translation, 3rd edition, Introduction by Hans Fink and Alasdair MacIntyre. ISBN 0-268-00934-1.
- K.E. Løgstrup. The Ethical Demand. Oxford University Press, Oxford, 2020, 2nd Translation and Introduction by Robert Stern and Bjørn Rabjerg ISBN 0-198855982
- K.E. Løgstrup. Beyond the Ethical Demand. University of Notre Dame Press, Notre Dame, 2007, Translation by Susan Dew and Introduction by Kees van Kooten Niekerk
- K.E. Løgstrup. Kierkegaard's and Heidegger's Analysis of Existence and its Relation to Proclamation. Oxford University Press, Oxford, 2020, Translation, Introduction and Notes by Robert Stern
- K.E. Løgstrup. Ethical Concepts and Problems. Oxford University Press, Oxford, 2020, Translation by Kees van Kooten Niekerk and Kristian-Alberto Lykke Cobos, Introduction by Hans Fink and Notes by Robert Stern and Bjørn Rabjerg
