= Morten Uhrskov Jensen =

Danish historian and politician

Morten Uhrskov Jensen^{da}
- Born: 1964 (age 61–62)
- Occupation: Politician
- Political party: Danish Unity

Morten Uhrskov Jensen (born 1964) is a Danish politician and leader of the national conservative party Danish Unity.^{da}

He has been a high school teacher at Herlufsholm Gymnasium, and was a member of the Danish People's Party until he left the party in 2010. He has been a blogger for Jyllands-Posten, editor of the former national conservative magazine Nomos, co-editor of the Danish Free Press Society's magazine Sappho, and has participated in the national conservative and anti-Islamic event at Mosbjerg Folkefest. He endorsed Donald Trump for United States President in August 2016, citing his support for building a wall on the Mexican border and banning Muslim immigration. He is a proponent of the Great Replacement conspiracy theory.

== Bibliography ==
- Et delt folk. Dansk udlændingepolitik 1983-2008. Lysias. 2008. ISBN 978-8798919858.
- Indvandringens pris: På vej mod et fattigere Danmark. People'sPress. 2012. ISBN 978-8771370614.
- Nationalkonservativ renæssance: at genfinde den rette vej. Peter la Cour. 2023. ISBN 978-8788606553.
