= Carsten Juste =

Danish journalist

Carsten Juste (born 6 July 1947) is a Danish journalist and former editor-in-chief of Jyllands-Posten, a Danish large-circulation newspaper.

Juste started out his career in 1979 as a trainee with Jyllands-Posten. He was its editor-in-chief from January 2003 until the end of April 2008. Juste was embroiled in the controversy following the paper's September 2005 publication of several cartoons depicting the Islamic prophet Muhammad.

Juste claimed the international furor over the cartoons amounted to a victory for opponents of free expression. "Those who have won are dictatorships in the Middle East, in Saudi Arabia, where they cut criminals' hands and give women no rights," Juste told The Associated Press. "The dark dictatorships have won." Danish police thwarted threats on the life of Juste and Jyllands-Posten staff members.

In another comment, Juste admitted that the 12 cartoons, one of which depicted Muhammad wearing a bomb-shaped turban, had caused "serious misunderstandings". Carsten Juste said: "The 12 cartoons ... were not intended to be offensive, nor were they at variance with Danish law, but they have indisputably offended many Muslims, for which we apologise."

== Al-Qaeda most wanted ==
In 2013, cartoonist Stéphane "Charb" Charbonnier was added to Al-Qaeda's most wanted list (he was then murdered by terrorists January 7, 2015), along with Ayaan Hirsi Ali, Geert Wilders, Salman Rushdie, Lars Vilks and three Jyllands-Posten staff members: Kurt Westergaard, Carsten Juste, and Flemming Rose. In 2015, 10 journalists and 2 police officers were murdered in Charlie Hebdo's office in Paris. After the attack, Al-Qaeda called for more killings.

== See also ==
- Jyllands-Posten Muhammad cartoons controversy
