= Tidehverv =

Danish theological movement and associated periodical

Tidehverv (English: Turn of Times) is the name of a Danish theological movement and its associated periodical. Professor Hans Morten Haugen has described it as the most influential theological movement in Denmark. Originally it was a Grundtvigian movement reacting against liberal theology and its ethical-idealist stance; in the late 20th century it shifted in a national conservative, anti-modernist direction with two of its leading members, Søren Krarup and Jesper Langballe, representing the Danish People's Party in Parliament. Its theological approach has been characterized as a combination of Luther's doctrine of the two kingdoms, Søren Kierkegaard's existentialism and Grundtvig's emphasis on the Danish nation.

== History ==
Founded in 1926, Tidehverv was originally a parallel to the Neo-orthodox Swiss-German dialectical theory associated with Karl Barth. The theology was centered on a radical interpretation of the relation between sin and grace, combined with the Kierkegaardian concept of living in the decision in the moment. The movement rebelled against liberal theology, including liberal Grundtvigianism focusing on preaching an evangelical message and rejecting activist or idealist notions. Early figures in the movement were K. E. Løgstrup who sought an active engagement with the public, but in the early 1950s he and other moderate figures of the movement left. But by then the importance of the movement had almost entirely surpassed that of the two other main movements – the Liberal Grundtvigianism and Inner Mission in Denmark.

As Søren Krarup entered the movement in 1967 it extended its aims to include political and cultural critique, becoming in effect an element in the culture wars.

The movement now espouses a strict and conservative Lutheranism, rejecting humanism and cultural radicalism as totalitarian ideologies incompatible with Lutheran piety. All forms of Humanism are seen as man's worship of himself, a basically blasphemous action. The idea of God as love is considered a naive and dangerous idealism. Tidehverv also rejects ideologies of cultural and religious pluralism as alien to what they see as the Danish-Lutheran national ethos.

Through its political engagement with two of its leading members, Søren Krarup (editor of the journal "Tidehverv" since 1984) and Krarup's cousin, parish priest Jesper Langballe, representing the Danish People's Party in the Danish parliament from 2001 to 2011, the movement was a driving force in Danish cultural politics during the terms of government of Anders Fogh Rasmussen and Lars Løkke Rasmussen. In parliament the movement's members were instrumental in advocating and implementing anti-immigration, anti-Islamic, anti-liberal and national conservative policies. Since the movement adheres to the Two Kingdoms doctrine, seeing Church and State as non-overlapping magisteria, its role in politics has been understood by its members, not as participatory democratic policy making, but rather as a freedom struggle against an oppressive and anti-religious cultural radical hegemony.

== Publications ==
The movement publishes the journal Tidehverv, as well as theological and political treatises, books and pamphlets – many of them critical of Islam and cultural radicalism.

In 1999 Tidehverv the publishing house published a Danish translation of Martin Luther's pamphlets "On War against the Turk" [1528] and "On the Jews and their Lies" [1543] in a single edition titled "Against the Turk and the Jew" (reprinted in 2012).

Since its foundation in 1926 the editors of the journal have been:

- 1926–1974 Niels Ivar Heje, pastor
- 1974–1984 Vilhelm Krarup, pastor
- 1984–2012 Søren Krarup, pastor, Member of Parliament
- 2013– Agnete Raahauge, pastor

The journal have been edited by members of the same family since 1974 as the current editor, Agnete Raahauge, is the daughter of Søren Krarup, who is the son of Vilhelm Krarup.
