= Flemming Rose =

Danish journalist, author

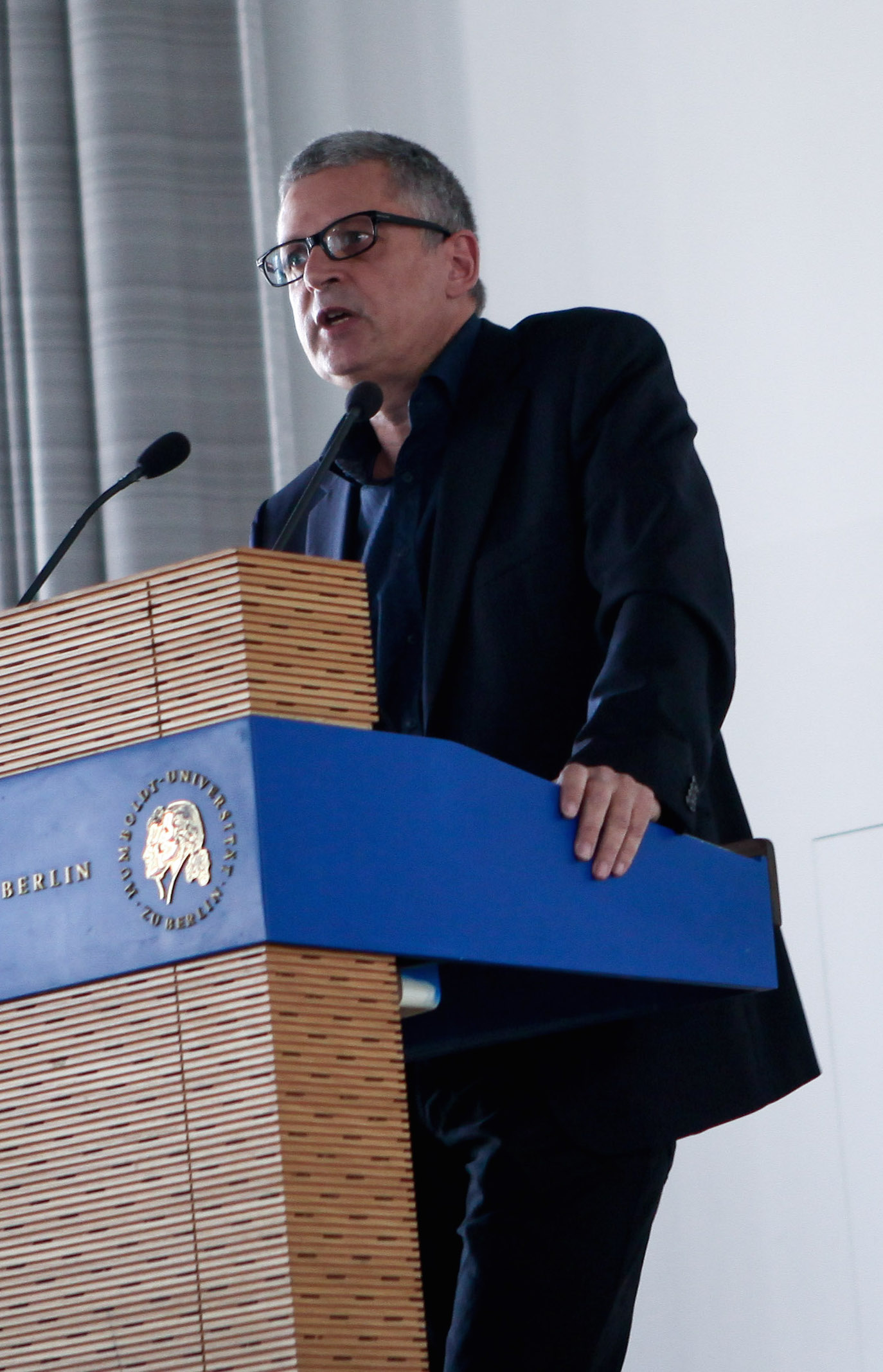
Flemming Rose at the 2015 European Students For Liberty Conference in Berlin

Flemming Rose (born 11 March 1958) is a Danish journalist, author and Senior Fellow at the Cato Institute. He previously served as foreign affairs editor at the Danish newspaper Jyllands-Posten. As culture editor of the same newspaper, he was principally responsible for the September 2005 publication of the cartoons that initiated the Jyllands-Posten Muhammad cartoons controversy early the next year, and since then he has been an international advocate of the freedom of speech.

== Life ==
Rose grew up in Copenhagen. He was one of three children. His father left the family when Rose was a small boy, and they were out of touch for decades. After the cartoon crisis, his father wrote him a letter suggesting that they meet and expressing his agreement with Rose's position on the cartoons. As a result, they met and reconciled.

Rose graduated with a degree in Russian language and literature from University of Copenhagen. From 1980 to 1996 he was the Moscow correspondent for the newspaper Berlingske Tidende. Between 1996 and 1999 he was that newspaper's correspondent in Washington, D.C. In 1999 he became Moscow correspondent for Jyllands-Posten and in April 2004 was named its cultural editor, replacing Sven Bedsted. Since 2010, he has been the paper's foreign affairs editor. In November 2015, Rose announced that he was leaving Jyllands-Posten.

== Cartoon controversy ==
Rose is best known for commissioning a group of drawings of Muhammad that were published in Jyllands-Posten on 30 September 2005. His reasoning was that many European creative artists had engaged in self-censorship out of fear of Muslim violence. The immediate trigger for the commission was the case of the Danish children's book author Kåre Bluitgen, who reportedly couldn't find an illustrator for a book about the life of Muhammad. Jyllands-Posten invited Danish illustrators to depict Muhammad "as you see him." Not all of the cartoons submitted in response to his invitation featured images of Muhammed. Two of them caricatured Bluitgen, one mocked Jyllands-Posten itself, while others caricatured Danish politicians. The most famous of the cartoons, by Kurt Westergaard, depicted Muhammad with a bomb in his turban.

In February 2006, Rose wrote an essay for the Washington Post entitled "Why I Published Those Cartoons." He noted that Kurt Westergaard had previously drawn outrageous cartoons of Jesus and the Star of David, neither of which had led to "embassy burnings or death threats". Rose asked: "Has Jyllands-Posten insulted and disrespected Islam?...When I visit a mosque, I show my respect by taking off my shoes. I follow the customs, just as I do in a church, synagogue or other holy place. But if a believer demands that I, as a nonbeliever, observe his taboos in the public domain, he is not asking for my respect, but for my submission. And that is incompatible with a secular democracy." As for avoiding offense, Rose stated: "I am offended by things in the paper every day: transcripts of speeches by Osama bin Laden, photos from Abu Ghraib, people insisting that Israel should be erased from the face of the Earth, people saying the Holocaust never happened. But that does not mean that I would refrain from printing them as long as they fell within the limits of the law and of the newspaper's ethical code….As a former correspondent in the Soviet Union, I am sensitive about calls for censorship on the grounds of insult. This is a popular trick of totalitarian movements: Label any critique or call for debate as an insult and punish the offenders….The lesson from the Cold War is: If you give in to totalitarian impulses once, new demands follow. The West prevailed in the Cold War because we stood by our fundamental values and did not appease totalitarian tyrants."

=== After the cartoon incident ===
After the cartoon crisis, Rose traveled around the U.S. and interviewed such figures as Francis Fukuyama, Bill Kristol, Richard Perle, and Bernard Lewis for the New York Times and Jyllands-Posten. The interviews later appeared in Rose's book Amerikanske stemmer (American Voices). Rose has continued to write and be interviewed extensively about the cartoons and the issues raised by the controversy. He said in a 2007 interview that "publication of the cartoons definitely raised the level of consciousness about self-censorship." Although some observers have denied that he achieved his goal with the cartoons because there was supposedly "more self-censorship" than before, Rose maintained that what had increased was not self-censorship but awareness of it: "before the cartoon controversy, there were many instances of self-censorship that went unnoticed." Prior to the publishing of the cartoons, he noted, the Tate gallery in London had removed a torn-up copy of the Koran from an exhibition in order to avoid offending Muslims. "There was no public reaction to this; there was no talk about self-censorship although it was an obvious case." After the cartoon case, by contrast, the proposed cancellation for similar reasons of a Berlin production of Idomeneo caused "a tremendous public outcry and outrage."

Rose argued in the interview that "it is discriminatory toward Muslims to say that we should not make fun of their religion when we are making fun of everybody else's religion….I'd like to think that in some sense, the cartoons were an act of inclusion because we were not asking more or less of Muslims but exactly the same as of everybody else. Danish Muslims should be treated as adults, not as a weak minority needing special treatment like small children." He also expressed surprise "that more European newspapers republished the cartoons than those in the United States." Unlike the major U.S. dailies, several major European papers reprinted them. "There are two narratives here: There are those who say that the controversy was about self-censorship—about denying a religious group special treatment in the public domain. That is my narrative. Then, you have another narrative saying: This was not about free speech or self-censorship; it was about a powerful newspaper insulting a minority. This was a fair argument until the moment when the threats were issued. The twelve cartoonists and I received death threats; newspapers were closed in Russia and in Malaysia, and newspaper editors were jailed in Jordan and Yemen. At that point, it became an issue exclusively about free speech."

Europeans, Rose suggested in the interview, do not know how to deal with Islam because of its "strangeness" to them and because of their own "self-hatred stemming from our colonial past and things like that." Even though Europeans "have been criticizing, challenging, and ridiculing Christianity for decades if not centuries," they "do not do the same with Islam because we have lost our sense of religiosity and are afraid of insulting or being accused of insulting a minority. In my mind, this is not a question of insult but of equal treatment." He said that people now showed "a lot more understanding of my position than a year ago."

In an October 2007 interview with the American libertarian magazine Reason, Rose stated that "the left is in a deep crisis in Europe because of their lack of willingness to confront the racist ideology of Islamism. They somehow view the Koran as a new version of Das Kapital and are willing to ignore everything else, as long of they continue to see the Muslims of Europe as a new proletariat." He explained that his "behavior during the 'cartoon crisis'… was very much informed by my experience with Soviet Union because I saw the same kind of behavior both inside the Soviet Union and those dealing with the Soviet Union in the West."

In a February 2008 interview with Der Spiegel, Rose said that "on a global level people who are in favor of free speech have to unite in order to get rid of all kinds of laws around the world that limit the right to free speech – blasphemy laws, laws protecting dictators, laws which are being used to silence people who are critical." He added that Denmark's "debate about integration and about fundamental values in our democracy is far more fact-based than it used to be. The cartoons didn't create a new reality, but they revealed a reality. That reality was already there, but not everybody was willing to see it. Now this reality has become clear and we can discuss the real problems based on facts instead of some abstract thinking."

=== Plot against Westergaard and afterward ===
In February 2008, in response to a plot to kill Kurt Westergaard, 17 Danish newspapers reprinted his cartoon of Muhammed with the bomb in his turban. "My colleagues at Jyllands-Posten and I understand that the cartoon may be offensive to some people," wrote Rose in the Wall Street Journal, "but sometimes the truth can be very offensive." He quoted George Orwell: "If liberty means anything, it means the right to tell people what they do not want to hear." He also stated that "the plot to kill Mr. Westergaard is…part of a broader trend that risks undermining free speech in Europe and around the world." There is "a global battle for the right to free speech," he maintained, and although legal systems differ, "the justifications for censorship and self-censorship are similar in different parts of the world: Religious feelings and taboos need to be treated with a kind of sensibility and respect that other feelings and ideas cannot command." Rose rejected this special treatment, noting that during the Cold War "people like Václav Havel, Lech Wałęsa, Andrei Sakharov" had insisted that "It is not cultures, religions or political systems that enjoy rights. Human beings enjoy rights, and certain principles like the ones embedded in the U.N. Declaration of Human Rights are universal." Rose also rejected the "misplaced sensitivity" that "is being used by tyrants and fanatics to justify murder and silence criticism," and deplored the West's "lack of clarity on these issues," which led some people to argue "that Salman Rushdie, Theo van Gogh, Ayaan Hirsi Ali, Taslima Nasreen and Kurt Westergaard bear a certain amount of responsibility for their fate. They don't understand that by doing so they tacitly endorse attacks on dissenting voices in parts of the world where no one can protect them."

In March 2009, Rose spoke in Oslo, and described the Norwegian debate on free speech as "politically correct," less "open, direct, and coarse" than in Denmark. Because many Norwegian commentators cherish the idea of their country as a peacemaker, he argued, they hold back to avoid creating unpleasantness.

In April 2009, Rose spoke at the Hebrew University of Jerusalem. Rose said that Islam expert Bernard Lewis had told him that the cartoon crisis marked "the first time Muslims [had tried] to impose Islamic law on non-Muslim countries." He also said, "There's a problem with Muslims in Europe and it must be dealt with – but limiting freedom of expression is not the solution." He further commented: "There are those who viewed the cartoons that I published as a form of incitement, but I don't think a statement should be measured by the response it yields, especially if the response is irrational and stupid." He also stated that "There was a time after the crisis that I had to take extra precautions, but that is in the past. I never felt threatened – or that I have to be silent."

=== Tavshedens Tyranni ===
In 2011, five years to the day after the cartoons were first published in Jyllands-Posten, they were republished in Denmark in Rose's book Tavshedens Tyranni (Tyranny of Silence). The Norwegian publisher that bought the rights to the book described it as "a 500-page collection of essays about free speech and its boundaries." A reviewer in the Norwegian magazine Minerva commented that "one cannot help being extremely impressed by the way he has handled the pressure." His main point, wrote the reviewer, is that "in a liberal democracy no individual or group can demand special treatment in the free exchange of words." For Rose, "freedom of speech is not a Western value, but a global value." When Rose's book was about to come out, Danish Foreign Minister Lene Espersen met with 17 ambassadors from Muslim countries in an effort to prevent a new cartoon crisis.

=== Holocaust cartoons ===
On 8 February 2006, Flemming Rose said in interviews with CNN and TV 2 that Jyllands-Posten planned to reprint satirical cartoons depicting the Holocaust that the Iranian newspaper Hamshahri planned to publish. He told CNN "My newspaper is trying to establish a contact with that Iranian newspaper Hamshahri, and we would run the cartoons the same day as they publish them". Later that day the paper's editor-in-chief said that Jyllands-Posten under no circumstances would publish the Holocaust cartoons and Flemming Rose later said that "he had made a mistake". The next day Carsten Juste, the editor-in-chief of Jyllands-Posten, stated that Flemming Rose was on indefinite leave because he needed time off. After some months Rose returned to Jyllands-Posten.

=== Al-Qaeda hit list ===
In 2013, Flemming Rose was added to a hit list in Al-Qaeda in the Arabian Peninsula's Inspire magazine, along with cartoonist Stéphane "Charb" Charbonnier, Lars Vilks and three Jyllands-Posten staff members: Kurt Westergaard, Carsten Juste. In 2015, over 12 people were murdered in attacks on Charlie Hebdo in Paris. After the attack, Al-Qaeda called for more killings.

=== Invitation to speak withdrawn by the University of Cape Town, South Africa ===
The Academic Freedom Committee of the University of Cape Town in South Africa invited Flemming Rose in March 2015 to speak at its 2016 TB Davie Memorial Lecture on academic freedom, scheduled to be held during August 2016. This invitation was withdrawn by the Vice Chancellor, Max Price, during July 2016 over fears that the lecture may "spark conflict on campus, create security risks and retard rather than advance academic freedom at the university."

== Works ==
- Mod strømmen (Against the Stream), in Russian by Boris Yeltsin (translated by Flemming Rose to Danish), Schønberg 1990.
- Katastrofen der udeblev (The Disaster that did not Happen), Gyldendal, 1998.
- Velfærdsstaten tur/retur – efter socialdemokratismens sammenbrud (The Rise and Fall of the Welfare-state – after the Collapse of Social-Democracy), Gyldendal, 2005 (Editor)
- Amerikanske stemmer, Jyllands-Postens Forlag, 2006.
- Tavshedens Tyranni (Tyranny of Silence), 2010

=== Translations ===
Rose has translated several books from Russian into Danish, including Den sørgmodige detektiv (Viktor Astafyev, 1987); Børn af Arbat (Anatoly Rybakov, 1987); parts of Perestrojka, nytænkning i russisk politik (Mikhail Gorbachev, 1987); 3 x tak til kammerat Stalin: min barndom og ungdom i Rusland 1936–54 (Anmartin Broide, 1988); and Mod strømmen (Boris Yeltsin, 1990).

== Honors and awards ==
- The Danish Free Press Society's journalist prize, the Sappho Prize (2007)
- Publicistprisen by the National Press Club of Denmark (2015)
- Fritt Ord Honorary Award by Fritt Ord (Norway) (2015)
- The Milton Friedman Prize for Advancing Liberty (Washington DC, United States 2016)
- Knight of the Ordre des arts et des lettres (Paris, France 2016)
