= Mikael Jalving =

Danish journalist, historian, author and political commentator

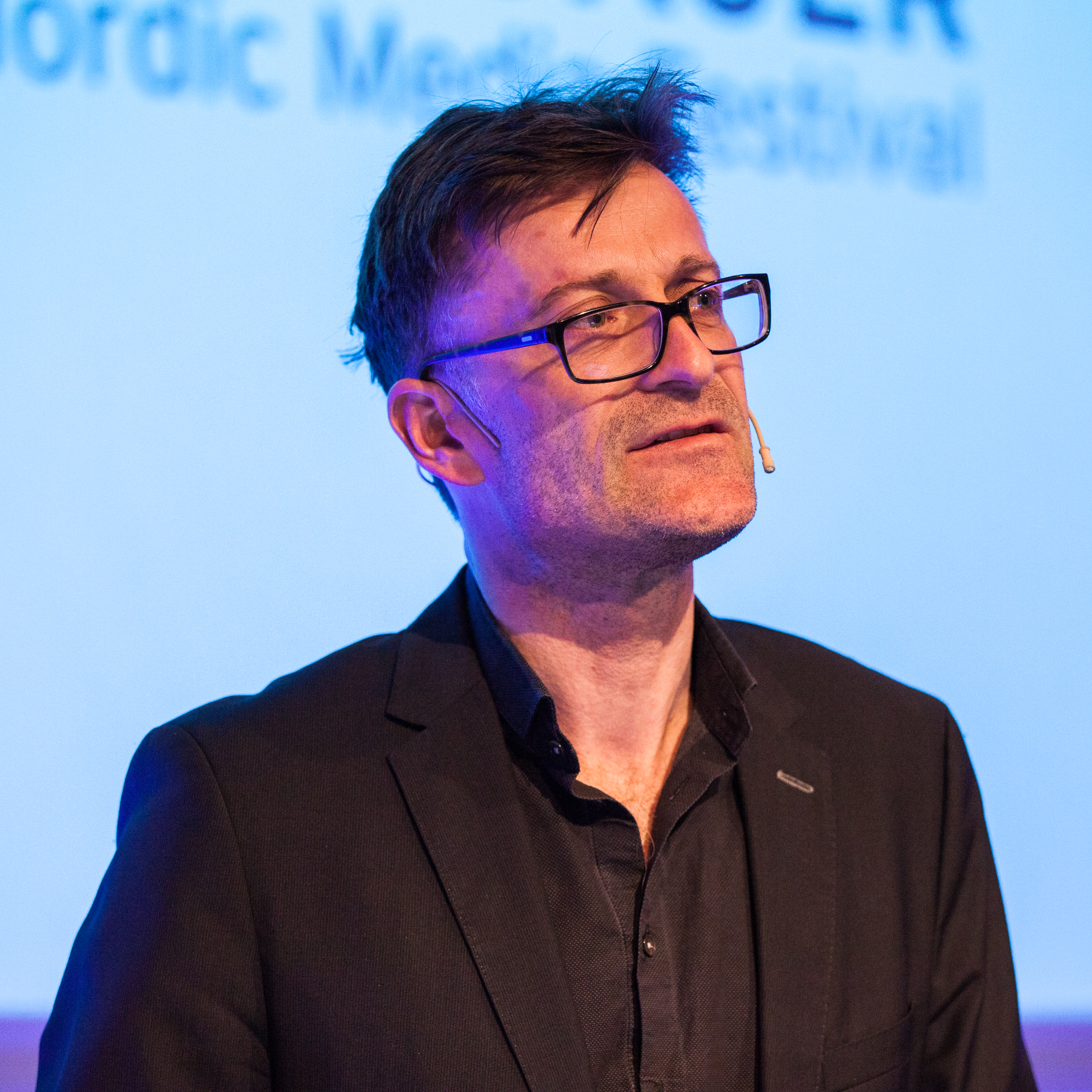
- Mikael Jalving, 2016
- Born: 1 October 1968 (age 57); Aarhus, Denmark
- Education: European University Institute
- Occupations: Journalist; historian; author; political commentator

Mikael Jalving (born 1 October 1968) is a Danish journalist, historian, author and political commentator. Jalving worked as a commentator for Berlingske Tidende and wrote as the newspaper's most widely read blogger, until 2009 when he was hired by Jyllands-Posten. He has a Ph.D. in history from the European University Institute in Florence.

Jalving has described himself as politically being national-liberal, social conservative, and more right-wing than all parties represented in the Folketing. He caught attention in Sweden in 2011 for his book Absolut Sverige, which according to Dagens Nyheter describes a land of "self-righteous Swedes, treacherously lulled into a social democratic dystopia of control and political correctness". The book was partly a response to a book by Swedish journalist Lena Sundström that criticised Danish attitudes towards immigration.

During the month of July 2014, Jalving hosted a limited daily radio show called Danmarks Röst ("Voice of Denmark", inspired by Cold War-era Voice of America), which aimed to transmit debate to Swedish listeners about subjects perceived to be taboo in Swedish public debate.

Jalving was criticised by an Islam researcher at the University of Copenhagen for misinforming about a Muslims' replies about 'sharia' in a questionnaire that did not mention sharia, but rules in the Quran, while sharia are based on other texts.

== Bibliography ==
- Søren Krarup og hans tid (2014)
- Absolut Sverige: En rejse i tavshedens rige (2011)
- Magt og ret. Et opgør med Godheden (2007)
- Utopiske Europa. Artikler om historiens nutid (1998)
- Mellem linierne. Thorkild Hansens historieskrivning (1994)
