= Christian Langballe =

Danish politician (1967–2025)

Member of the Folketing
- In office 15 September 2011 – 5 June 2019
- Constituency: West Jutland

Personal details
- Born: 17 January 1967; Aarhus, Denmark
- Died: 19 April 2025 (aged 58)
- Political party: Danish People's Party
- Spouse: Lone Langballe
- Children: 3
- Parents: Jesper Langballe (father); Birgitte Langballe (mother)
- Education: Aarhus University

Christian Bernhard Langballe (17 January 1967 – 19 April 2025) was a Danish politician. He was a member of the Folketing for the Danish People's Party. He was elected into parliament at the 2011 Danish general election and then reelected in the 2015 Danish general election. His father was also a politician, Jesper Langballe.

== Life and career ==
Christian Bernhard Langballe was born on 17 January 1967 in Aarhus as the son of Jesper Langballe and Birgitte Langballe. He studied at Aarhus University from 1990 to 1998.

He was the Parish priest of Tjele and Nørre Vinge parishes and Viborg parish from 2000.

Christian Langballe was married to Lone Langabelle, who is also a Danish politician from the Danish People's Party, the couple had three children. He lives in Foulum in Viborg Municipality.

He became Member of Parliament for the Danish People's Party in West Jutland's Storkreds from 15 September 2011 to 5 June 2019 in the 2011 Danish general election. He was Temporary Member of Parliament for the Danish People's Party in West Jutland's Storkreds (deputy for Dennis Flydtkjær), from 9 June 2020 to 26 June 2020 and candidate for the Danish People's Party in Viborg East constituency from 2010. He ran again as a Member of Parliament in the 2019 Danish general election and 2022 Danish general election, but was not re-elected.

In October 2023 he was diagnosed with a terminal brain tumor. The politician and priest had received a bleak prognosis indicating that he had less than a year left to live based on statistics. He revealed his illness in an interview with Kristeligt Dagblad. He was called in for a scan on 10 October 2024, where doctors delivered the serious news about his condition.

On 19 April 2025, Langballe died after a battle with cancer. He was 58.
