= Danish Free Press Society =

Danish non-partisan organization

- Katrine Winkel Holm speaking at an event held by the Danish Free Society and the Young Conservatives Aarhus
- Formation: 2004
- Type: Freedom of expression advocacy group
- Headquarters: Denmark
- Chairman: Aia Fog
- Website: trykkefrihed.dk

The Danish Free Press Society (Danish: Trykkefrihedsselskabet) is a Danish organisation founded in 2004 and originally led by Lars Hedegaard, that works in support of freedom of expression. It presents an annual award, the Sappho Award. The organisation has a publishing house, Trykkefrihedsselskabets Bibliotek, which focuses on research and criticism of Islam, and the organisation had about 800 members in 2010.

== Background and activities ==
The organisation was founded in 2004 by Lars Hedegaard, David Gress, Kai Sørlander, Søren Krarup and Jesper Langballe, after Danish PEN objected to admit Hedegaard as a member due to his writings on Islam. The organisation published an online magazine, Sappho, that was edited by Helle Merete Brix and Katrine Winkel Holm. Winkel Holm took over as chairman of the organisation in 2014 after Hedegaard was subjected to an assassination attempt.

In 2009, the organisation reprinted the Muhammad cartoon drawn by Kurt Westergaard.

The organisation formerly counted Venstre politician Søren Pind and Conservative politician Naser Khader among its advisory board members, but both left the organisation in 2009 after controversial comments on Muslims by the chairman Lars Hedegaard.

The organisation was extended internationally with the International Free Press Society in 2009, and has been described as a part of the counter-jihad movement.

The Sappho Award has been awarded to people including Mark Steyn, Thilo Sarrazin, Ezra Levant, Roger Scruton, Olga Romanova and Tommy Robinson.

Aia Fog became chairman of the organisation in 2018.
