= 12 bis =

French publishing company

- Founded: August 3, 2007
- Founder: Dominique Burdot; Laurent Muller
- Country of origin: France
- Headquarters location: Paris
- Fiction genres: Comics manga
- Official website: 12bis.com

12 bis was a French publisher active from 3 August 2007 to 1 August 2017, which has since been absorbed by Glénat. The company published predominantly bande dessinée comic books and manga in France. It was founded by Dominique Burdot, former managing director of publications at Glénat, and Laurent Muller, the previous editorial director also at Glénat.

The website was created in December 2009.

The publisher had undertaken reprinting of previously successful works by François Bourgeon, Les Passagers du vent (The Passengers of the Wind) and Le Cycle de Cyann (The Cycle of Cyann).

The company also published the comic book satire concerning American wine critic Robert Parker, Robert Parker: Les Sept Pêchés capiteux.

Monetary losses during operation led to the redressement judicaire (legal redress) of the company in April 2013. During a redressement judicaire businesses facing hardship may avoid paying fees in order to save the business, but if unsuccessful they must be liquidated. With debts of €2,902,928 including €1,196,753 in unpaid copyrighting fees, 12 bis was forced to liquidate. That September Glénat acquired the remaining assets, which included the entire 12 bis catalogue except for the works of François Bourgeon.
