= Kurt Westergaard =

Danish cartoonist (1935–2021)

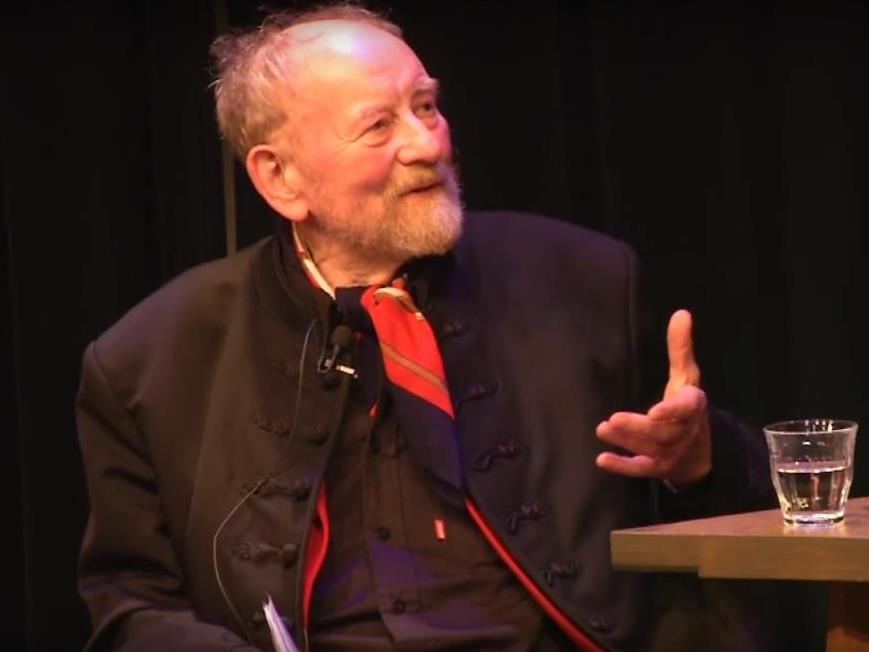
- Westergaard in 2015
- Born: Kurt Vestergaard; 13 July 1935; Døstrup, Denmark
- Died: 14 July 2021 (aged 86); Copenhagen, Denmark
- Education: Ranum Seminarium; University of Copenhagen
- Occupation: Cartoonist
- Known for: Jyllands-Posten Muhammad cartoons controversy
- Awards: Sappho Award, M100 Media Award

Kurt Westergaard (born Kurt Vestergaard; 13 July 1935 – 14 July 2021) was a Danish cartoonist. In 2005 he drew a cartoon of the Islamic prophet Muhammad, wearing a bomb in his turban as a part of the Jyllands-Posten Muhammad cartoons, which triggered several assassinations and murders committed by Muslim extremists around the world, diplomatic conflicts, and state-organized riots and attacks on Western embassies with several dead in Muslim countries. After the drawing of the cartoon, Westergaard received numerous death threats and was a target of assassination attempts. As a result, he was under constant police protection.

== Early life ==
Westergaard was born on 13 July 1935 in the village of Døstrup, in the Mariagerfjord area of Jutland. He grew up in a conservative Christian family (Inner Mission) environment, going to Sunday school. Westergaard was introduced to cultural radicalism during high school in the 1950s, which he experienced as an "epiphany" and "a liberation from the religious subjugation of his childhood."

Westergaard was a trained schoolteacher, educated at Ranum Seminarium. After working as a teacher for some time, he enrolled at the University of Copenhagen to study psychology. He subsequently worked as a teacher for handicapped children and was a principal of a school in the Djursland area for the handicapped.

== Cartooning ==
After briefly working for the newspaper Demokraten, he was a cartoonist for Jyllands-Posten from the early 1980s on. In 2005, he drew a depiction of Muhammed wearing a bomb in a turban as part of the Prophet cartoons controversy.

On 12 February 2008, the Danish Security and Intelligence Service (PET) arrested three Muslims – two Tunisians and one Moroccan-born Dane – who were charged with planning to murder Westergaard. After the plot was foiled, the Danish secret service was made responsible for protecting Westergaard. He was placed under police surveillance when traveling to and from work and his house was fitted with steel doors, a panic room, reinforced glass in the windows, and surveillance cameras.

Following the release of Dutch politician Geert Wilders' film Fitna in 2008, which used Westergaard's cartoon without permission, Westergaard made a cartoon depicting Wilders with a bomb and a sign which reads: "Danger! Freedom of expression".

In a 2009 interview, Westergaard said he was trying to "show that terrorists get their spiritual ammunition from parts of Islam and with this spiritual ammunition, and with dynamite and other explosives, they kill people." He took issue with the way Danish people have judged his intentions, telling Canadian blogger Jonathan Kay that he was shunned by many of his former friends: "One of my old friends from the left, he said last year to me 'There are many who say that if something happens to [you], you were asking for it' — that it would be my own fault." Westergaard also criticised the reaction of immigrant communities in Denmark to his cartoon, stating that "many of the immigrants who came to Denmark, they had nothing. We gave them everything – money, apartments, their own schools, free university, health care. In return, we asked one thing – respect for democratic values, including free speech. Do they agree? This is my simple test."

== Attacks ==
"Kurt Westergaard Press Freedom Lecture", De Balie Amsterdam, 2 May 2015

On 1 January 2010, a 28-year-old Somali Muslim intruder armed with an axe and knife entered Westergaard's house and was subsequently shot and wounded by police. Westergaard was unharmed due to security precautions in his house. He escaped to a panic room when he saw the intruder standing in the hallway wielding an axe. Westergaard took his five-year-old granddaughter into the "panic room" when he realized what was happening. The intruder attempted to break down the reinforced door with his axe, shouting phrases like "We will get our revenge!", "Revenge!" and "Blood!" He failed to get through and was shot in the hand and knee by police officers who arrived on the scene within a few minutes. The assailant was arrested, taken into custody, and charged with the attempted murders of Westergaard and a police officer.

This second attempted murder in two years received extensive coverage in the Danish newspapers. The Sunday edition of Jyllands-Posten included a front-page article about how Westergaard now needs a bodyguard to provide round-the-clock security; a full-page article on the background of the controversy; an interview with Westergaard by Lars Pedersen; a list of quotes showing the "disgust and condemnation" aroused by the attack; an article about the assailant's appearance in a court in Aarhus; two articles about the man himself, who had apparently been living in Denmark for fifteen years and was known to the intelligence services; and, in the editorial and in an opinion piece by political commentator Ralf Pittelkow, advocacy of the values Western society is based on, in particular freedom of expression.

According to PET intelligence, the suspect is closely linked to the Somali Islamist insurgency group al-Shabaab, commonly considered a terrorist organization, as well as an al-Qaeda affiliate in East Africa.

On 22 June 2011, the assailant was found guilty of an attempt to perform an act of terrorism and attempted murder, by a unanimous jury. The assailant pleaded guilty to unlawful possession of a weapon and breaking and entering, but pleaded not guilty to the other charges. He was sentenced to 10 years in prison followed by permanent deportation from Denmark.

In March 2013, a psychiatric patient was taken into custody by the Danish police. According to Danish newspapers the man had been a passenger on a bus, when he started yelling and threatening to bomb the bus and Kurt Westergaard, who was not on the bus.

== Al-Qaeda hit list ==
In 2010 Anwar al-Awlaki published an Al-Qaeda hit list in Inspire magazine, including three Jyllands-Posten staff members: Kurt Westergaard, Carsten Juste, and Flemming Rose, along with other figures claimed to have "insulted Islam," including Salman Rushdie, Ayaan Hirsi Ali and cartoonist Lars Vilks. The list was later expanded to include Stéphane "Charb" Charbonnier, who was murdered in a terror attack on Charlie Hebdo in Paris, along with 11 other people. After the attack, Al-Qaeda called for more killings.

== Death ==
Westergaard died in his sleep in Copenhagen on 14 July 2021, a day after his 86th birthday, after suffering from a long illness.

== Awards ==
Westergaard was awarded the Sappho Award in May 2008, an award given by the Danish Free Press Society to a 'journalist who combines excellence in his work with courage and a refusal to compromise'.

On 8 September 2010, he was awarded the M100 Media Award (M100-Medienpreis) by German Chancellor Angela Merkel for his contributions to freedom of opinion.

== Memoirs ==
In 2011, Westergaard, helped by John Lykkegaard, published his memoir Manden bag stregen.

== See also ==
- Charlie Hebdo shooting
- Theo van Gogh (1957–2004), Dutch film director
- Lars Vilks
- Stéphane Charbonnier (Charb)
- Naji al-Ali (1938–1987), Palestinian political cartoonist
