= Morten Messerschmidt =

Danish politician

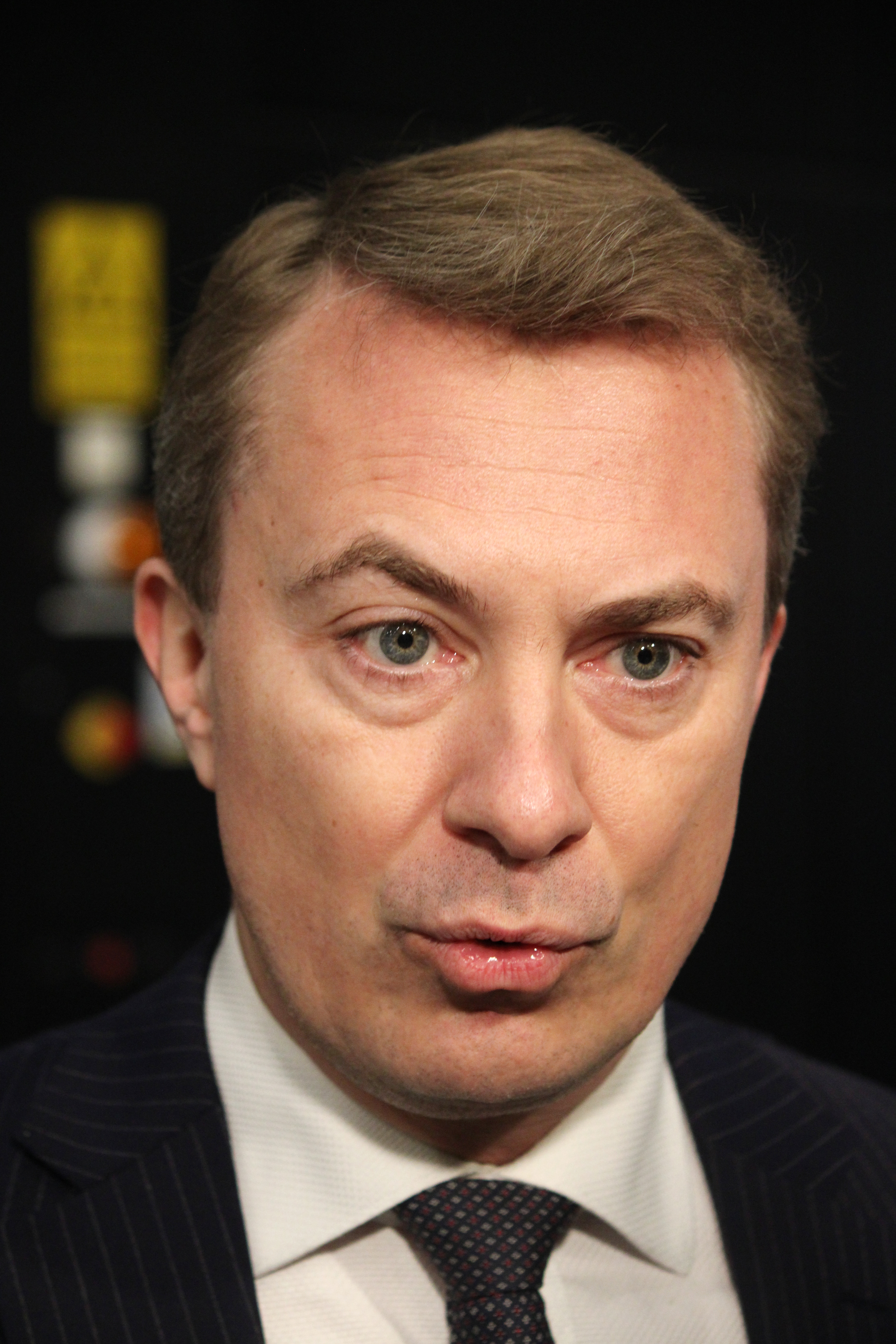
- Messerschmidt in 2026

Leader of the Danish People's Party
- Incumbent
- Assumed office 23 January 2022
- Preceded by: Kristian Thulesen Dahl

Member of the European Parliament
- In office 1 July 2009 – 30 June 2019
- Constituency: Denmark

Member of the Folketing
- Incumbent
- Assumed office 5 June 2019
- Constituency: North Zealand
- In office 8 February 2005 – 18 June 2009
- Constituency: East Jutland (2007—2009); Aarhus (2005—2007)

Personal details
- Born: 13 November 1980 (age 45) Frederikssund, Denmark
- Party: Danish People's Party
- Spouse: Dot Wessmann
- Education: University of Copenhagen

Morten Messerschmidt (born 13 November 1980) is a Danish politician and since 2022 leader of the Danish People's Party. He was an elected Member of the Folketing at the 2019 Danish general election having previously served from 2005 to 2009. At the 2014 European Parliament election, he was elected a Member of the European Parliament for Denmark with 465,758 personal votes; the highest number of personal votes ever cast at a Danish election.

== Personal life ==
Morten Messerschmidt was born on 13 November 1980 in Frederikssund as the son of worker Carsten Christofersen and municipal secretary Inge Messerschmidt. He graduated from Sankt Annæ Gymnasium in 1999 and became a cand.jur (Master of Laws) from the University of Copenhagen in 2009. He served as a church singer in Islebjerg Church from 1999 to 2005. In 2003, Messerschmidt participated in the TV program Big Brother V.I.P. with i.a. Carl-Mar Møller, Helena Blach Lavrsen and Lise Lotte Lohmann. The latter later introduced him to Bakkens Hvile singer Dot Wessman, with whom he became girlfriend and cohabitant with in 2007. Together in 2008, they released and jointly performed on the Christmas album Jul i Europa (Christmas in Europe). On 9 June 2015, Messerschmidt announced that they had separated later announcing their reunion on 1 July 2016.

In November 2019, Messerschmidt's sister, Line Messerschmidt, was murdered in a double homicide by Martin Christensen Degn; after which in 2021 Morten became the legal guardian of her children.

== Political career ==
=== Early career ===
Messerschmidt was a member of the national committee of the Danish People's Party Youth 2000–2005. He was political deputy chairman of the youth party 2001–2005. In 2002, he founded the association Kritiske Licensbetalere, of which he was also chairman.

Messerschmidt was convicted in 2002, receiving a suspended sentence of prison for 14 days for violating the Danish hate speech law by publishing material that attempted to link Islamic societies to rape, violence and forced marriages.

Between 2003 and 2005 he was assistant to the Danish People's Party's European parliamentarian Mogens Camre.

=== First election to the Folketing ===
Before taking his seat in the European Parliament, Messerschmidt was a member of the Danish Parliament, the Folketing from 8 February 2005, having won his seat with 3 personal votes, and being re-elected in 2007, this time getting 11,466 votes.

For a short period of time in 2007, Messerschmidt left the Danish People's Party due to accusations of showing Nazi sympathies, as he according to the tabloid newspaper B.T. had praised Adolf Hitler in Tivoli. In 2009, Messerschmidt won a lawsuit against the former editor-in-chief of B.T. Arne Ullum and journalist Jacob Heinel Jensen which both were punished with 10 daily fines of 500 kr. each and had to pay compensation of 25,000 kr. for defamation. The court accepted Messerschmidt's explanation that his use of the Nazi salute "Heil" and singing of Deutschland, Deutschland über alles was not an attempt to praise Hitler, but made as a joke.

=== In the European Parliament ===
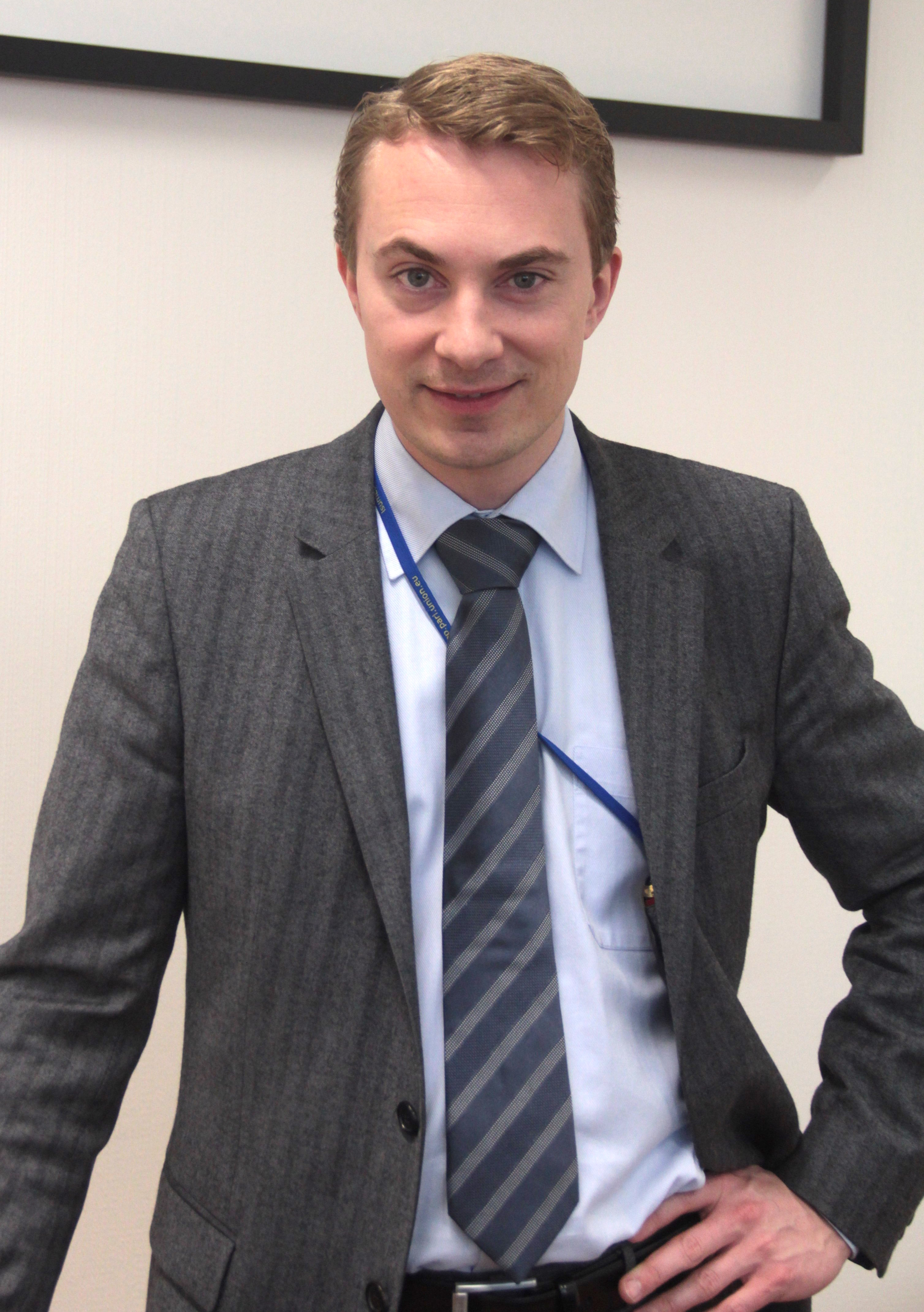
Messerschmidt as a member of the European Parliament, February 2013

At the 2009 European Parliament election, Messerschmidt was elected to the European Parliament, winning his seat with 284,500 personal votes, the highest number of personal votes among all the Danish candidates in the election.

Messerschmidt has been associated with the counter-jihad movement, and has been described as a proponent of the ideology associated with the blog Gates of Vienna for which he gave an interview at a 2009 conference in Washington, D.C. He has in counterjihad-associated interviews "blamed left-wing parties and governments for capitulating to the Muslim 'invasion'," and stated that the European Union would be overrun by a civil war with Muslims in 20 years.

At the 2014 European Parliament election, he received 465,758 personal votes, the highest number of personal votes ever received in any European Parliament election in Denmark. Afterwards he was the group leader of his party in the European Parliament from 2014 until his resignation in August 2016.

In 2019, Messerschmidt was elected to the Folketing with 7,554 personal votes, and in 2020 became vice chairman of the DF, replacing Søren Espersen.

=== Leadership of the Danish People's Party ===
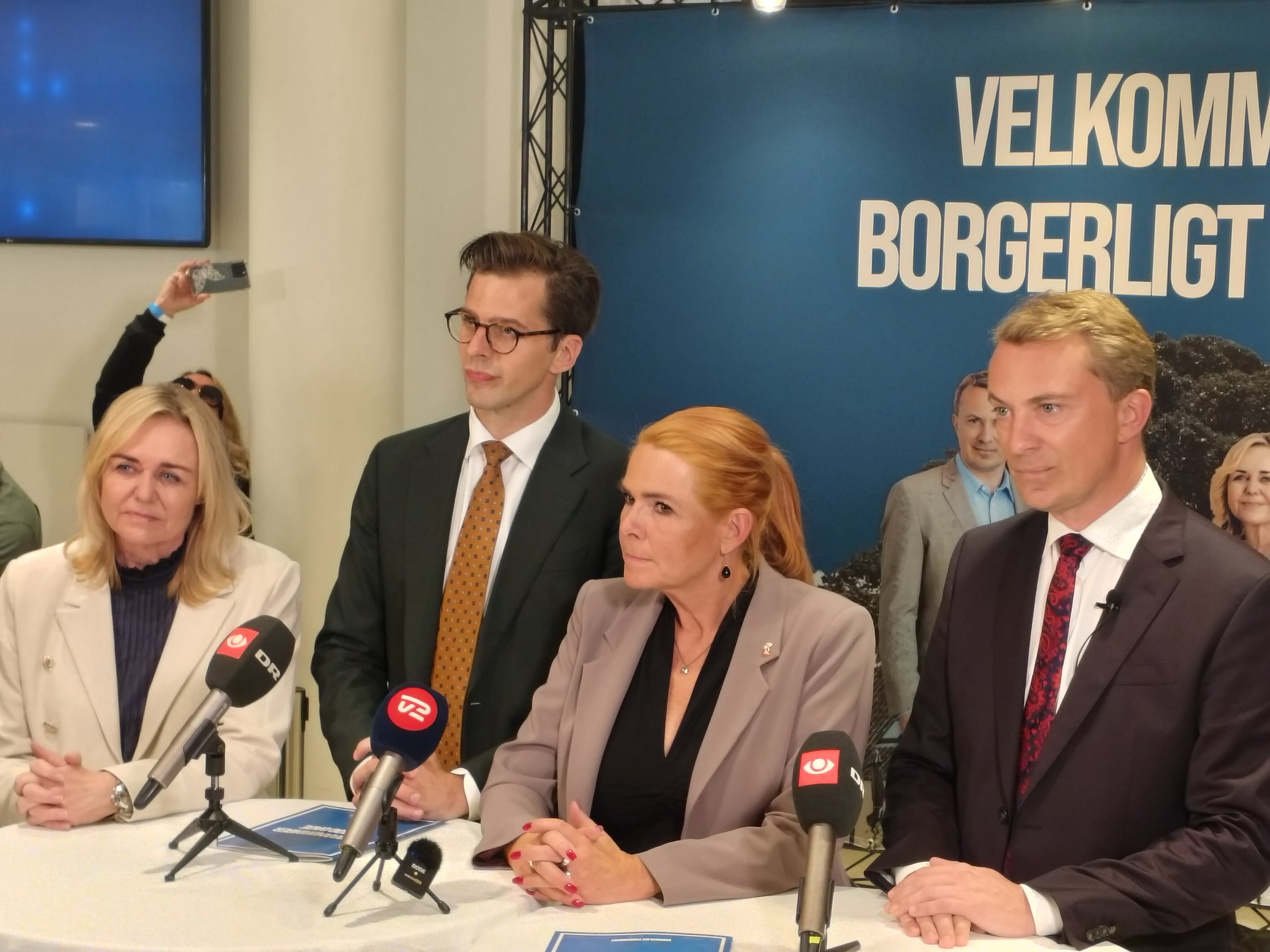
Messerschmidt with Mona Juul, Alex Vanopslagh and Inger Støjberg in Fredericia, 6 September 2025

In January 2022, Dahl stood down as leader and was replaced by Messerschmidt in a leadership election where he won 499 out of the 828 delegators' votes against two other candidates. After Messerschmidt, a total of 11 out of 16 MPs had in June left the party including Thuelsen Dahl who was the only one of them who passed on his seat to the next in line. In the following election, the DPP got 2,6% of the vote, and 5 seats in the Folketing, which was their worst ever election result.

Under Messerschmidt's leadership, the party has moved in a more economic liberal direction, advocating tax cuts. Messerschmidt also moved the party further to the right on social policies, launching a campaign against wokeness and identity politics, and has also advocated for remigration, and pushed the Great Replacement theory.

== Fraud allegation and acquittal ==
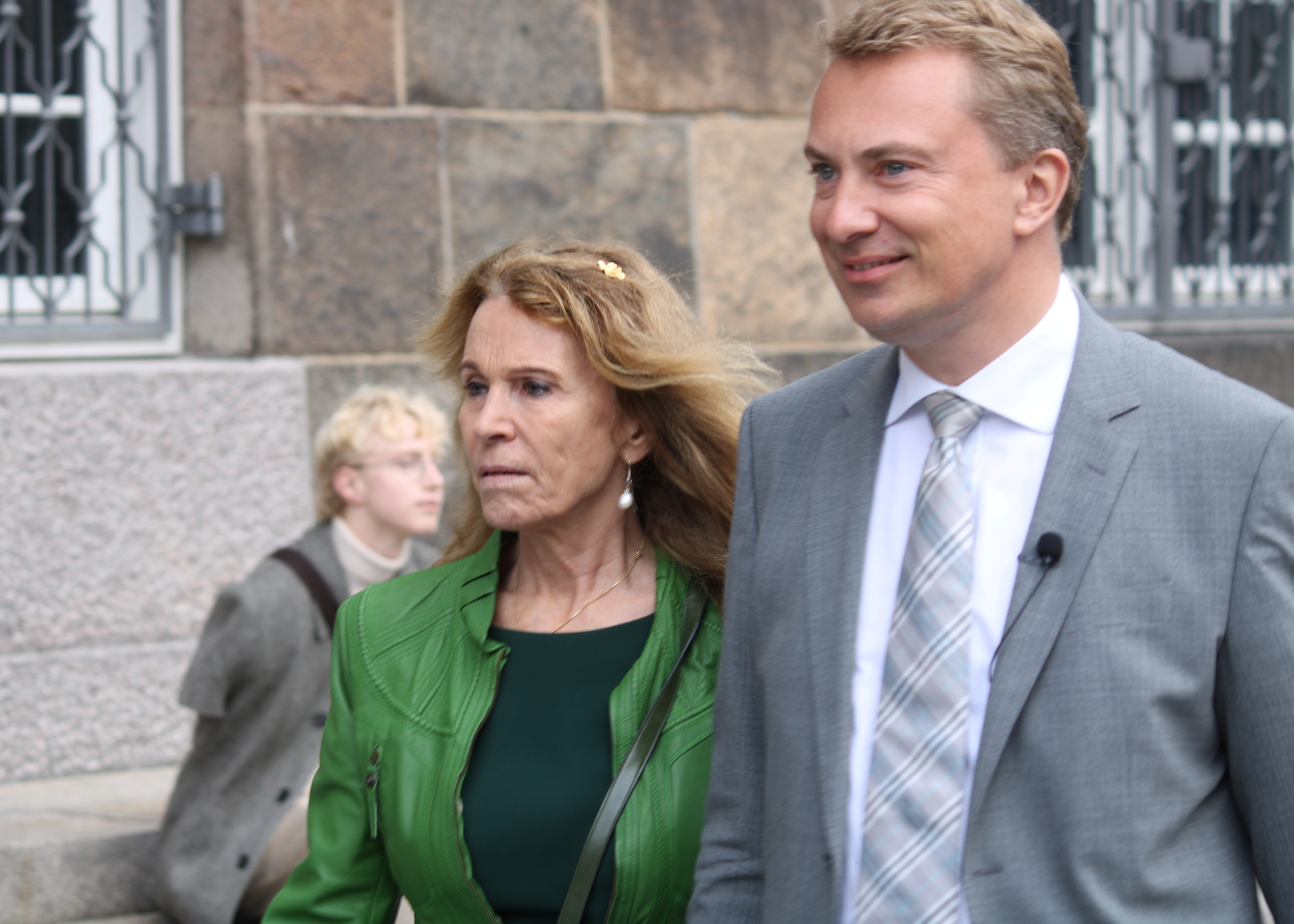
Messerschmidt with his spouse Dot Wessman at the 2025 opening of the Folketing

In August 2016, Messerschmidt resigned as EU parliament group leader for the DPP after allegations of fraud concerning misuse of EU funds related to the foundations FELD and MELD that Messerschmidt had managed. OLAF launched an investigation into the case, and Messerschmidt was reported to the police for identity theft by MEP Rikke Karlsson, who had left the DPP in 2015 in protest against Messerschmidt's alleged withholding of information about the foundations. Karlsson and then-fellow DPP MEP Jørn Dohrmann had been elected to the board of MELD without their knowledge. Ekstra Bladet was nominated for a European Press Prize for investigative reporting in 2017 for their coverage of the scandal.

In 2021, he was charged with misuse of 98.000 DKK in EU funds. On August 13, 2021, he was sentenced to 6 months of conditional prison, but The High Court of Eastern Denmark annulled the verdict in December 2021 due to the Independent Police Complaints Authority of Denmark finding the judge to have a conflict of interest. On 21 December 2022 Messerschmidt was acquitted of all charges by the Court of Frederiksberg.

== Bibliography ==
- Dansk forår – Fra krise til sammenhold (2026)
- Den kristne arv (2021)
- Farvel til folkestyret: hvordan EU ødelægger frihed, folk og folkestyre - og hvad vi kan gøre ved det (2020)
- Overlad det trygt til Bruxelles – Debat om EU (2015, co-author)
- Dagbog fra EU. Om EU's spild af dine penge (2013)
- Intet over og intet ved siden af ... ‒ EU-Domstolen og dens aktivisme (2013)

Political offices
Preceded by Kristian Thulesen Dahl	Leader of the Danish People's Party; 2022–	Succeeded by Incumbent
