= Søren Krarup =

Danish pastor and politician (1937–2023)

Member of the Folketing
- In office 20 November 2001 – 15 September 2011

Personal details
- Born: 3 December 1937 Grenaa, Denmark
- Died: 8 November 2023 (aged 85) Copenhagen, Denmark
- Party: Danish People's Party
- Spouse: Anette Elisabeth Krarup (m. 1962)
- Children: Agnete • Marie • Inger • Katrine

Søren Krarup (3 December 1937 – 8 November 2023) was a Danish pastor, writer and politician who served as a member of the Danish Parliament from 2001 to 2011 for the Danish People's Party.

Krarup was a significant and influential critic from the Danish national conservative movement, as well as the theological movement Tidehverv. He wrote several books about Christianity, history and politics, and was regarded by both his supporters and many of his opponents as a great intellectual capacity. He was regarded as the main ideologue of the Danish People's Party, although he rejected the particular term himself, as he considered "love for the fatherland" not to be an ideology or "-ism", but rather a fundamental precondition for one's life. He was a noted critic of Cultural Radicalism, Marxism and official Danish social policy, EU policy and immigration and refugee policy.

Krarup was, like a number of other prominent Danish politicians from the Danish People's Party, a member of Den Danske Forening, but along with party members Jesper Langballe and Søren Espersen resigned from the association in 2002 after it had publicly compared Islam with the plague. In 2007, while he was still not a member of the association, he however stated in a speech at its jubilee that he had continued to hold its magazine "with great pleasure", and said he regarded the association as "the freedom fighters of our time".

== Political controversies ==
Krarup created a minor stir in December 2007 by announcing that he would like to see Scania, Halland and Blekinge reunited with Denmark, if they expressed such a desire through a referendum. He also expressed the view that all members of the Danish minority in Schleswig ought to carry the hope that at some future time Denmark's border should be extended to the Eider river, restoring Danish rule over Southern Schleswig which is now part of Germany.

Krarup stated that he considered gay people to be "handicapped" people suffering from an "abominable disease", who should be subject to "compulsory registration". Following the 2017 French presidential election, Krarup caused a minor controversy by referring to President-elect Emmanuel Macron as a "pretty little gayboy".

Krarup described corporal punishment of children as "not harmful".

== Personal life ==
Krarup was born in Grenaa, to vicar Vilhelm Krarup and Bodil Marie Krarup (née Langballe). He was married to Anette Elisabeth (née Lund Steen), with whom he had four children, one of whom, Marie, has also entered politics. He was the grandson of Alfred Krarup and cousin of Jesper Langballe and Ole Krarup.

Krarup graduated from Christianshavns Gymnasium in 1957 and cand.theol. in 1965. He was vicar in Seem and resident curate at Ribe Cathedral from 1965 to 2005 and ward chairman from 1965. He was director of Studenterkredsen from 1961 to 1963. From 2000 to 2001 he represented his party on the board of DR. He was from 1965 co-publisher of Tidehverv, and editor from 1984.

In October 2000, he was listed as the Danish People's Party candidate in Sønderborg and was elected to parliament for the Sønderjylland constituency on 20 November 2001.

Krarup had an extensive writing career behind him, as he from 1960 to 2001 published 26 books. Especially through his role in Tidehverv and as MP for the Danish People's Party, he had great influence on modern Danish theology and modern Danish national conservative politics. Krarup died at his home on Amager, Copenhagen on 8 November 2023, at the age of 85, with his death being announced the same day.

== Bibliography ==
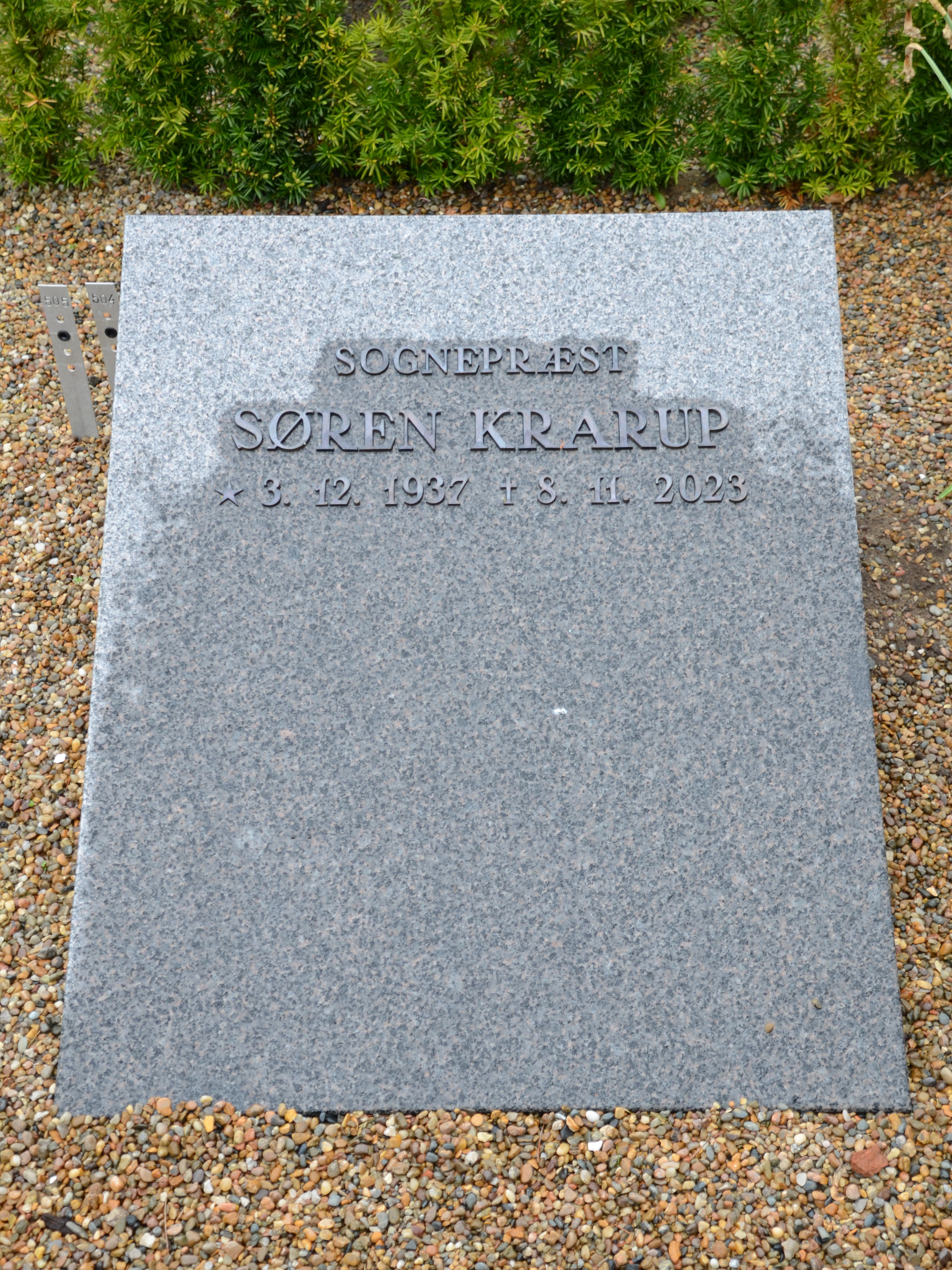
Tombstone at Seem Church

- Harald Nielsen og hans tid (1960)
- Hørups Arv og Arvtagere (1961)
- Demokratisme (1968)
- Om at ofre sig for menneskeheden og ofre menneskene (1969)
- Den hellige hensigt (1969)
- Præstens prædiken (1971)
- At være eller ikke være (1971)
- Den danske dagligdag (1973)
- Fædreland og Folkestyre (1974)
- Selvbesindelse (1976)
- Forsvar for familien 1977)
- Den politiske syge (1979)
- Verden Var (1979)
- Loven (1980)
- Fordringen (1982)
- Det moderne Sammenbrud (1984)
- Begrebet Anstændighed (1985)
- I Virkeligheden (1986)
- Det tavse flertal (1987)
- Synd tappert! (1990)
- Dansk kultur (1993)
- Den danske nødvendighed (1994)
- Den kristne tro. Katekismus for voksne (1995)
- I min levetid. 60 års Danmarkshistorie (1998)
- Dansen om menneskerettighederne (2000)
- Kristendom og danskhed (2001)
- "Kære Søren, en brevveksling om det nye Danmarks kurs" (with Søren Pind) (2003)
- Systemskiftet (2006)
