= Jesper Langballe =

Danish priest, author and politician (1939–2014)

Jesper Marquard Langballe (31 August 1939 – 15 March 2014) was a Danish Lutheran priest, author and politician who represented the right-wing populist Danish People's Party (Danish: Dansk Folkeparti) in the Danish parliament, Folketinget, from 2001 to 2011. Langballe was elected in the Viborg constituency. His son Christian Langballe was elected to the Folketinget in 2011.

== Biography ==
Langballe was born in Copenhagen as the son of physician Mogens Marquard Langballe and housewife Agnete Langballe, née Wolfhagen. He is the cousin of Søren Krarup, another MP for Dansk Folkeparti.

He was educated as a journalist at Skive Venstreblad 1959-61 and Ringkøbing Amts Dagblad 1962-63 and as a priest at the Ministry for Ecclesiastical Affairs institute 1972–75. He worked as a journalist at Jyllands-Posten 1964–72 as cultural reporter and back page editor doing political satire. Later he worked as a priest in Thorning-Grathe parish 1975–2007. He has since 1982 been a co-editor and writer at the fundamentalist Lutheran religious periodical Tidehverv.

== Views on church politics ==
Langballe has been spokesman on church affairs for the Danish People's Party in the last few years and has positioned himself as a strong proponent for the privileged status of the Danish National Church (Danish: Folkekirken) and its close connection to the state, described in the Danish constitution.

In this context he has, for instance, stated as follows about the wishes of the Catholic church in Denmark to have its member contributions collected alongside state taxes, like the state Lutheran Church of Denmark:

The tax collection is a part of the state backing, and it shall not be provided for other religious communities. If you start doing this, then what about other private associations? In this context we are talking about an association with a religious purpose. But it might as well be a handball club.

== Views on Islam and muslims ==
In January 2010, Jesper Langballe defended controversial statements by Lars Hedegaard, chairman of the Danish Free Press Society, in the Danish newspaper Berlingske Tidende stating that:

Of course Lars Hedegaard should not have said that we see muslim fathers raping their daughters, when the reality rather seems to be that they simply kill them (the so called honor killings) – and besides that turn a blind eye to uncles raping them.

These controversial statements were later to be moderated by Langballe following pressure from party chairman Pia Kjærsgaard, and he expressed his regrets about the phrasing - while he still supported the general message of the statement. During the general uproar following the statements, city council member in Viborg for the Danish People's Party, Rikke Cramer Christiansen, decided to leave the party in protest.

=== Fear of islamization and self-censorship ===
Islam and islamization is seen by Jesper Langballe as an imminent threat to Denmark and Europe:

Islam and Christianity cannot be reconciled. And they haven't been able to during the 1400 years that Islam has been in existence. I see the religion Islam as a threat to any society where it settles.

As a member of the Danish parliament I have eagerly contributed to integration work and I wish it all the best. But you shouldn't, trying to help integration, subject yourself to self-censorship and stop talking about real problems. If islamization is allowed to go on unhindered in Denmark, there is definitely a risk that in a few years we are subjected to sharia. Of course there is.

In his original piece in Berlingske Tidende (mentioned above) Langballe explicitly referred to the book 1400-års krigen (The 1400 Year War), as well as referring to the book Mødom på mode (Fashionable Virginity) written by Danish author Kristina Aamand and her husband Asif Uddin.

1400-års krigen is written by the above-mentioned Lars Hedegaard along with Langballe's party fellow Mogens Camre. The summary of the book says (in English):

Lars Hedegaard and Mogens Camre analyze, for the first time in Danish, the Islamic war theory, strategy and tactics in its full extent. Militarily, theologically, historically, psychologically.

The book shows how badly prepared the West is for the new jihad, a jihad far more sophisticated than earlier Islamic conquest attempts. If the EU and the West do not soon awake, it will ultimately mean the end of freedom.

The authors also show that even though Islam is a skillful and determined opponent, we still have the opportunity for action if we want to avoid the destiny that has fallen upon all other non-Muslim populations having come under the iron heel of Islam.

As opposed to Lars Hedegaard og Mogens Camre, Kristina Aamand has denounced Jesper Langballe's use of her book.

== Selected works (in Danish) ==
- Contribution to the anthology Modstand og frihed (Resistance and Freedom), 1983.
- Contribution to the anthology Og give dig fred. Om Kristendom og fredsbevægelser (And grant you peace. About Christianity and Peace movements), 1984.
- Niels Blicher - en 1700-tals præst (Niels Blicher - an 18th-century priest), 2000
- Anlangendes et menneske: Blichers forfatterskab - selvopgør og tidsopgør (Regarding a Man: Blicher's Authorship - battling himself and battling the times), 2004.
