= Islam and blasphemy =

Overview of Islamic views on blasphemy

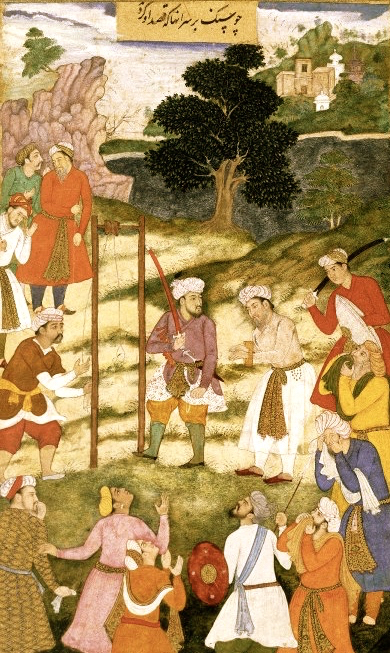
Sufi teacher Mansur Al-Hallaj was executed in Baghdad amid political intrigue and charges of blasphemy in 922.

In Islam, blasphemy is impious utterance or action concerning God, but is broader than in normal English usage, including not only the mocking or vilifying of attributes of Islam but denying any of the fundamental beliefs of the religion. Examples include denying that the Quran was divinely revealed, the Prophethood of one of the Islamic prophets, insulting an angel, or maintaining God had a son.

The Quran curses those who commit blasphemy and promises blasphemers humiliation in the Hereafter. However, whether any Quranic verses prescribe worldly punishments is debated: some Muslims believe that no worldly punishment is prescribed while others disagree. The interpretation of hadiths, which are another source of Sharia, is similarly debated. Some have interpreted hadith as prescribing punishments for blasphemy, which may include death, while others argue that the death penalty applies only to cases where perpetrator commits treasonous crimes, especially during times of war. Different traditional schools of jurisprudence prescribe different punishment for blasphemy, depending on whether the blasphemer is Muslim or non-Muslim, a man or a woman.

In the modern Muslim world, the laws pertaining to blasphemy vary by country, and some countries prescribe punishments consisting of fines, imprisonment, flogging, hanging, or beheading. Capital punishment for blasphemy was rare in pre-modern Islamic societies. In the modern era some states and radical groups have used charges of blasphemy in an effort to burnish their religious credentials and gain popular support at the expense of liberal Muslim intellectuals and religious minorities. Other Muslims instead push for greater freedom of expression. Contemporary accusations of blasphemy against Islam have sparked international controversies and incited mob violence and assassinations.

== Islamic scripture ==
In Islamic literature, blasphemy is of many types, and there are many different words for it: sabb (insult) and shatm (abuse, vilification), takdhib or tajdif (denial), iftira (concoction), la`n or la'ana (curse) and ta`n (accuse, defame). In Islamic literature, the term "blasphemy" sometimes also overlaps with kufr ("unbelief"), fisq (depravity), isa'ah (insult), and ridda (apostasy).

=== Quran ===
A number of verses in the Qur'an have been interpreted as relating to blasphemy. In these verses God admonishes those who commit blasphemy. Some verses are cited as evidence that the Qur'an does not prescribe punishments for blasphemy, while other verses are cited as evidence that it does.

The only verse that directly says blasphemy (sabb) is Q6:108. The verse calls on Muslims to not blaspheme against deities of other religions, lest people of that religion retaliate by blaspheming against Allah.

And do not insult (wa la tasubbu) those they invoke other than Allah, lest they insult (fa-yasubbu) Allah in enmity without knowledge. Thus We have made pleasing to every community their deeds. Then to their Lord is their return, and He will inform them about what they used to do.

— Qur'an 6:108

Verse 5:33 prescribes prison or mutilation or death for those "who wage war against Allah and His Messenger". Even though the verse doesn't mention blasphemy (sabb), some commentators have used to justify punishments for blasphemy. Other commentators believe this verse only applies to those who commit crimes against human life and property.

The only punishment of those who wage war against Allah and His Messenger and strive to make mischief in the land is that they should be murdered, or crucified, or their hands and their feet should be cut off on opposite sides, or they should be imprisoned. This shall be a disgrace for them in this world, and in the Hereafter they shall have a grievous chastisement. Except those who repent before you overpower them; so know that Allah is Forgiving, Merciful.

— Qur'an, ^{[Quran 5:33–34]}

33:57–61 have also been used by some commentators to justify blasphemy punishments. However, other scholars opined that verses 33:57–61 could only have been acted upon during the life of the Prophet and since the demise of Muhammad they are no longer applicable.

Other passages are not related to any earthly punishment for blasphemy, but prescribe Muslims to not "sit with" those who mock the religion – although the latter are admonishments directed towards a witness of blasphemy rather than the guilty of blasphemy:

When you hear Allah's revelations disbelieved in and mocked at, do not sit with them until they enter into some other discourse; surely then you would be like them.

— Qur'an, ^{[Quran 4:140]}

According to Shemeem Burney Abbas, the Qur'an mentions many examples of disbelievers ridiculing and mocking Muhammad, but never commands him to punish those who mocked him. Instead, the Qur'an asks Muhammad to leave the punishment of blasphemy to God, and that there would be justice in the afterlife.

=== Hadith ===
According to several hadiths, Muhammad ordered a number of enemies executed "in the hours after Mecca's fall". One of those who was killed was Ka'b ibn al-Ashraf, because he had insulted Muhammad.

The Prophet said, "Who is ready to kill Ka'b ibn al-Ashraf who has really hurt Allah and His Apostle?" Muhammad bin Maslama said, "O Allah's Apostle! Do you like me to kill him?" He replied in the affirmative. So, Muhammad bin Maslama went to him (i.e. Ka'b) and said, "This person (i.e. the Prophet) has put us to task and asked us for charity." Ka'b replied, "By Allah, you will get tired of him." Muhammad said to him, "We have followed him, so we dislike to leave him till we see the end of his affair." Muhammad bin Maslama went on talking to him in this way till he got the chance to kill him. Narrated Jabir bin 'Abdullah

— Sahih al-Bukhari, 4:52:270, see also Sahih al-Bukhari, 5:59:369, 3:45:687, 4:52:271

It has been narrated on the authority of Jabir that the Messenger of Allah said: Who will kill Ka'b b. Ashraf? He has maligned Allah, the Exalted, and His Messenger. Muhammad b. Maslama said: Messenger of Allah, do you wish that I should kill him? He said: Yes. He said: Permit me to talk (to him in the way I deem fit). He said: Talk (as you like).

— Sahih Muslim, 19:4436

A variety of punishments, including death, have been instituted in Islamic jurisprudence that draw their sources from hadith literature. Sources in hadith literature allege that Muhammad ordered the execution of Ka'b ibn al-Ashraf. After the Battle of Badr, Ka'b had incited the Quraysh against Muhammad, and also urged them to seek vengeance against Muslims. Another person executed was Abu Rafi', who had actively propagandized against Muslims immediately before the Battle of Ahzab. Both of these men were guilty of insulting Muhammad, and both were guilty of inciting violence. While some have explained that these two men were executed for blaspheming against Muhammad, an alternative explanation is that they were executed for treason and causing disorder (fasad) in society.

Muhammad declared that there shall be no punishment for murdering anyone who disparages, abuses or insults him (tashtimu, sabb al rasool). One hadith tells of a man who killed his pregnant slave because she persisted in insulting Muhammad. Upon hearing this, Muhammad is reported to have exclaimed: "Do you not bear witness that her blood is futile!" (anna damah hadarun) This expression can be read as meaning that the killing was unnecessary, implying that Muhammad condemned it. However, most hadith specialists interpreted it as voiding the obligation of paying the blood money which would normally be due to the woman's next of kin. Another hadith reports Muhammad using an expression which clearly indicates the latter meaning:

Narrated Ali ibn AbuTalib: A Jewess used to abuse the Prophet and disparage him. A man strangled her till she died. The Apostle of Allah declared that no recompense was payable for her blood.

— Sunan Abu Dawood, 38:4349 see also Sunan Abu Dawood, 38:4348

Some jurists suggest that the sunnah in Sahih al-Bukhari, 3:45:687 and Sahih al-Bukhari, 5:59:369 provide a basis for a death sentence for the crime of blasphemy, even if someone claims not to be an apostate, but has committed the crime of blasphemy. Some modern Muslim scholars contest that Islam supports blasphemy law, stating that Muslim jurists made the offense part of Sharia.

The words of Ibn Abbas, a prominent jurist and companion of Muhammad, are frequently cited to justify the death penalty as punishment blasphemy:

Any Muslim who blasphemes against Allah or His Messenger or blasphemes against any one from amongst the Prophets is thereby guilty of rejecting the truth of the Messenger of God, may Allah bless him and grant him peace. This is apostasy (ridda) for which repentance is necessary; if he repents he is released; if not then he is killed. Likewise, if any other person [non-Muslim] who is protected under a covenant becomes hostile and blasphemes against Allah or any one of Allah's Prophet and openly professes this, he breaches his covenant, so kill him.

— Ibn Qayyim al Jawziya and Ata 1998, 4:379

In Islamic jurisprudence, Kitab al Hudud and Taz'ir cover punishment for blasphemous acts.

== Islamic law ==
=== Islamic jurisprudence ===
The Quran curses those who commit blasphemy and promises blasphemers humiliation in the Afterlife. However, whether any Quranic verses prescribe worldly punishments is debated: some Muslims believe that no worldly punishment is prescribed while others disagree. Islamic jurisprudence (fiqh) of Sunni and Shia madhabs have declared different punishments for the religious crime of blasphemy, and they vary between schools. These are as follows:

==== Hanafi school ====
In the Hanafi school, blasphemy is regarded as synonymous with apostasy, and therefore, accepts the repentance of apostates. Those who refuse to repent, their punishment is death if the blasphemer is a Muslim man, and if the blasphemer is a woman, she must be imprisoned with coercion (beating) till she repents and returns to Islam.

However, blasphemy is not punishable by death for non-Muslims in the Hanafi school. The school's eponym, Abu Hanifa, opined that a non-Muslim can not be killed for committing blasphemy. In his Mukhtasar al-Tahawi, Hanafi jurist al-Tahawi (d. 933) argued that if a non-Muslim kept repeating the offense again and again, then they can be punished but not killed. Al-Jassas (d. 981) in his exegesis of Mukhtasar al-Tahawi wrote that the non-Muslim blasphemer will not be killed, albeit would be condemned verbally. Furthermore, al-Quduri (d. 1036/1037) stated that: "According to the position of Hanafi jurists, the covenant of dhimmi (non-Muslims) shall remain intact unless they join enemy forces. Our argument is, non-Muslims also insult God and say that He has a son and the Zoroastrians say He has an “opposite.” If this does not invalidate their covenant of security, then insult of the Prophet will also not do". As such, al-Kasani (d. 1191) also backed this claim, asserting that insulting the Prophet only adds to the original disbelief of the non-Muslim and does not break their covenant of security under Islamic law. Some assert punishment can be a tazir (discretionary, arrest or caning).

==== Maliki school ====
The Malikis view blasphemy as an offense distinct from, and more severe than apostasy. Death is mandatory in cases of blasphemy for Muslim men, and repentance is not accepted. For women, death is not the punishment suggested, but she is arrested and punished till she repents and returns to Islam or dies in custody. A non-Muslim who commits blasphemy against Islam must be punished; however, the blasphemer can escape punishment by converting and becoming a devout Muslim.

==== Shafi'i school ====
The Shafi'is recognize blasphemy as a separate offense from apostasy, but accepts the repentance of blasphemers. If the blasphemer does not repent, the punishment is death.

==== Other schools ====
The Hanbalis consider blasphemy as an offense distinct from, and more severe than apostasy. Death is mandatory in cases of blasphemy, for both Muslim men and women. Zahiri view insulting God or Islamic prophets as apostasy.

==== Ja'fari school (Shia) ====
In Ja'fari jurisprudence, blasphemy against Islam, the Prophet, or any of the Imams, to be punishable with death, if the blasphemer is a Muslim. In case the blasphemer is a non-Muslim, he is given a chance to convert to Islam, or else killed.

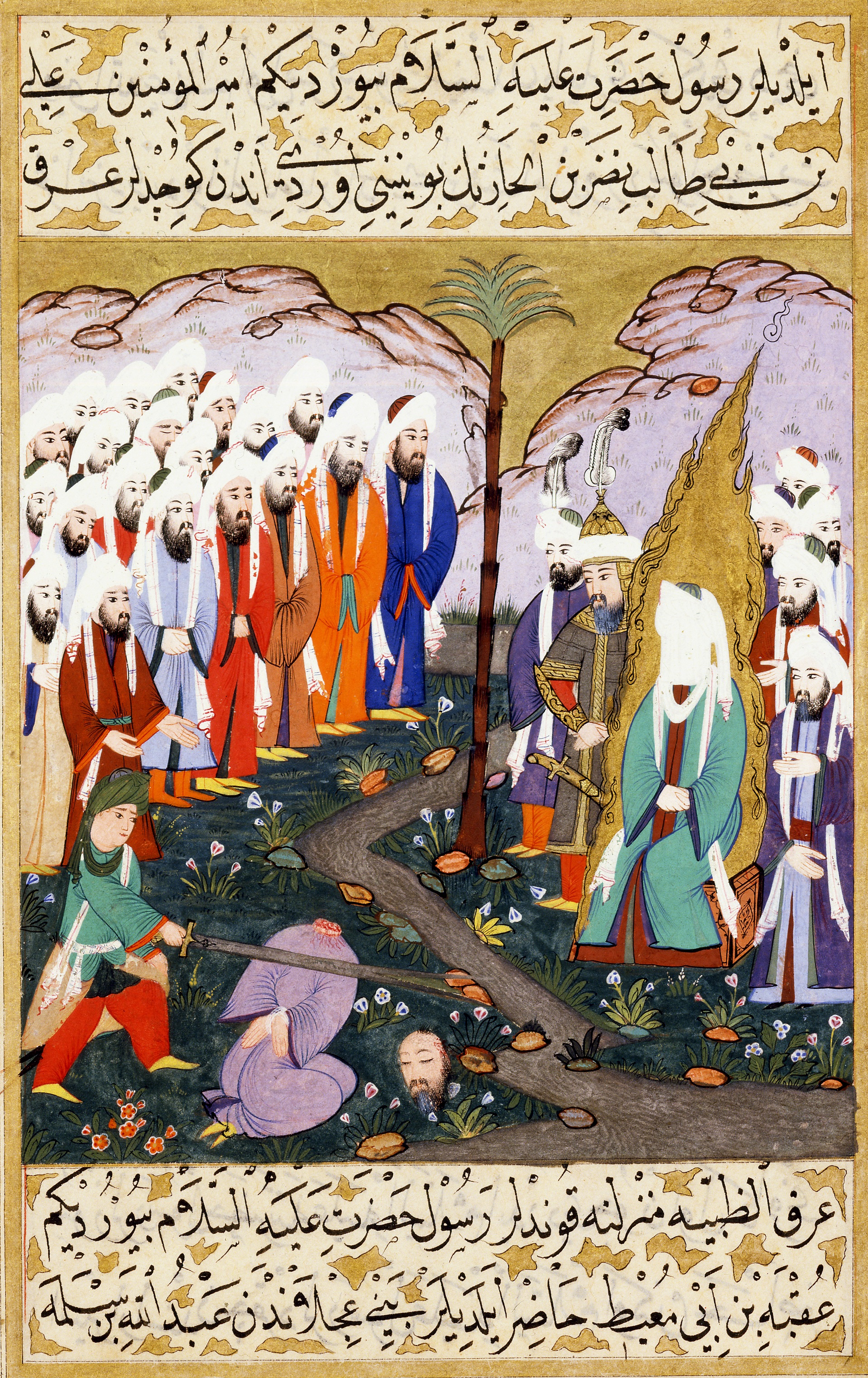
A painting from Siyer-i Nebi, Ali beheading Nadr ibn al-Harith in the presence of Muhammad and his companions

=== Blasphemy as apostasy ===
Because blasphemy in Islam included rejection of fundamental doctrines, blasphemy has historically been seen as an evidence of rejection of Islam, that is, the religious crime of apostasy. Some jurists believe that blasphemy by a Muslim who automatically implies the Muslim has left the fold of Islam. A Muslim may find himself accused of being a blasphemer, and thus an apostate on the basis of the same action or utterance. Not all blasphemy is apostasy, of course, as a non-Muslim who blasphemes against Islam has not committed apostasy. Blasphemy is defined as the act of speaking disrespectfully or irreverently about God and there is every other thing you can do to Cause blasphemy A specific example of blasphemy against the Holy Spirit occurs when someone attributes the good works of God (such as miracles) to Satan.

== Modern state laws ==
Blasphemy laws and penalties by jurisdiction: Death sentences Prison sentences Fines, other restrictions, or unknown penalty Blasphemy is a common law offence Blasphemy laws repealed No blasphemy laws

The punishments for different instances of blasphemy in Islam vary by jurisdiction, but may be very severe. A convicted blasphemer may, among other penalties, lose all legal rights. The loss of rights may cause a blasphemer's marriage to be dissolved, religious acts to be rendered worthless, and claims to property—including any inheritance—to be rendered void. Repentance, in some Fiqhs, may restore lost rights except for marital rights; lost marital rights are regained only by remarriage. Women have blasphemed and repented to end a marriage. Muslim women may be permitted to repent, and may receive a lesser punishment than would befall a Muslim man who committed the same offense. Most Muslim-majority countries have some form of blasphemy law and some of them have been compared to blasphemy laws in European countries (Britain, Germany, Finland etc.). However, in several countries, such as Afghanistan, Iran, Nigeria (the northern portion), Pakistan, and Saudi Arabia, blasphemy is punishable by death. In Pakistan, more than a thousand people have been convicted of blasphemy since the 1980s; though none have been executed. In addition, blasphemy is punishable as well by varying periods in prison in multiple other countries, such as Algeria, Egypt, Indonesia, Iraq, Kazakhstan, Kuwait, Malaysia, Oman, Qatar, Russia, Sudan, Turkey and the United Arab Emirates.

In Indonesia, anyone involved in blasphemy can receive up to five years in prison. However, in Russia, the punishment is less severe, because anyone involved in blasphemy can receive up to four years in prison in the country.

== History ==
=== Early and medieval Islam ===
According to Islamic sources Nadr ibn al-Harith, who was an Arab Pagan doctor from Taif, used to tell stories of Rustam and Isfandiyar to the Arabs and scoffed Muhammad. After the battle of Badr, al-Harith was captured and, in retaliation, Muhammad ordered his execution in hands of Ali.

According to certain hadiths, after Mecca's fall Muhammad ordered a number of enemies executed. Based on this early jurists postulated that sabb al-Nabi (abuse of the Prophet) was a crime "so heinous that repentance was disallowed and summary execution was required".

Sadakat Kadri writes that the actual prosecutions for blasphemy in the Muslim historical record "are vanishingly infrequent". One of the "few known cases" was that of a Christian accused of insulting the Islamic Prophet Muhammad. It ended in an acquittal in 1293, though it was followed by a protest against a decision led by the famed and strict jurist Ibn Taymiyya.

=== In the 20th and 21st century ===
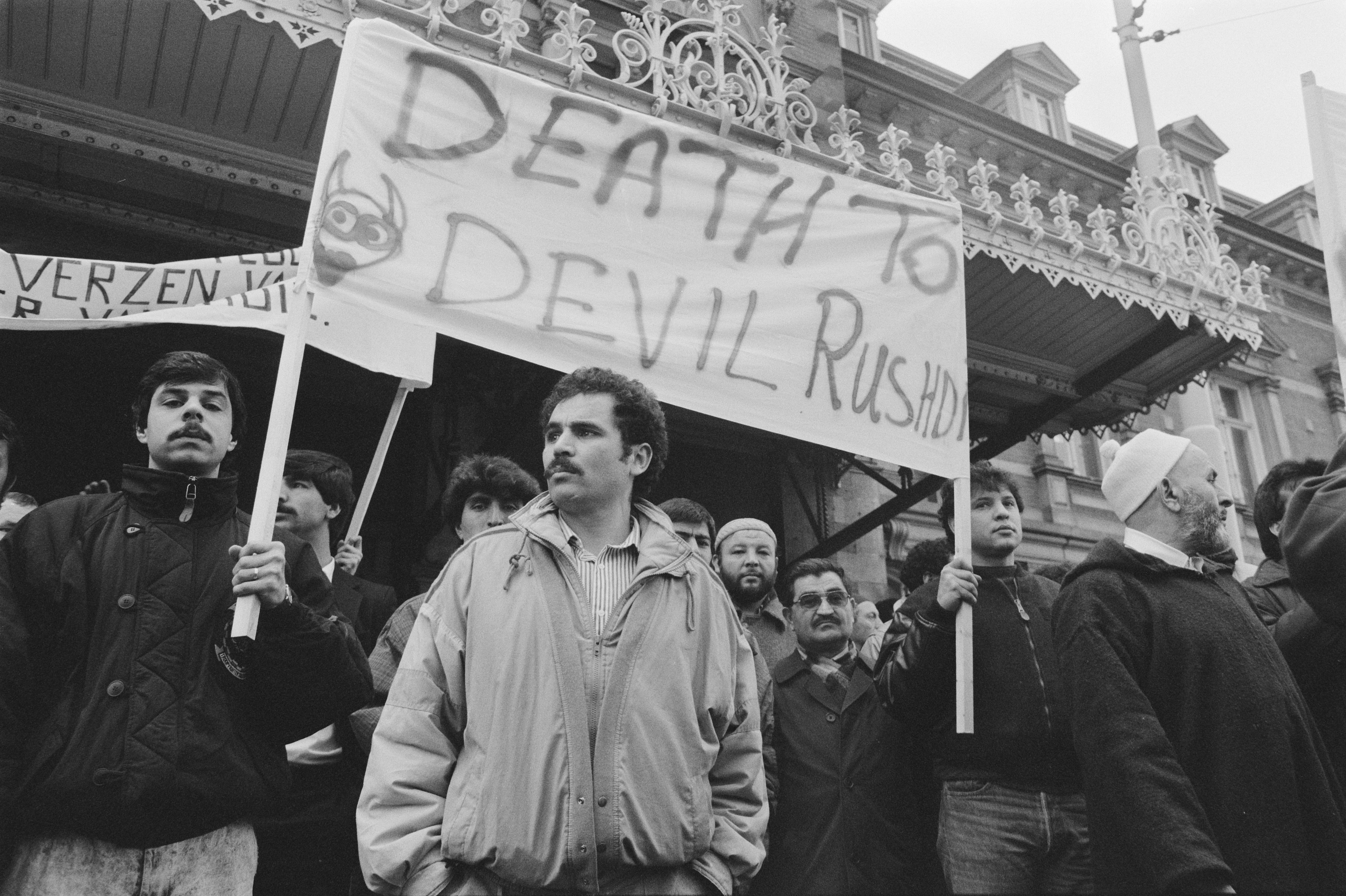
1989 demonstration against "The Satanic Verses" in Den Haag, Netherlands

In recent decades Islamic revivalists have called for its enforcement on the grounds that criminalizing hostility toward Islam will safeguard communal cohesion. In one country where strict laws on blaspheme were introduced in the 1980s, Pakistan, over 1300 people have been accused of blasphemy from 1987 to 2014, (mostly non-Muslim religious minorities), mostly for allegedly desecrating the Quran. Over 50 people accused of blasphemy have been murdered before their respective trials were over, and prominent figures who opposed blasphemy laws (Salman Taseer, the former governor of Punjab, and Shahbaz Bhatti, the Federal Minister for Minorities) have been assassinated.

As of 2011, all Islamic majority nations, worldwide, had criminal laws on blasphemy. Over 125 non-Muslim nations worldwide did not have any laws relating to blasphemy. In Islamic nations, thousands of individuals have been arrested and punished for blasphemy of Islam. Moreover, several Islamic nations have argued in the United Nations that blasphemy against Muhammad is unacceptable, and that laws should be passed worldwide to proscribe it. In September 2012, the Organisation of Islamic Conference (OIC), who has sought for a universal blasphemy law over a decade, revived these attempts. Separately, the Human Rights Commission of the OIC called for "an international code of conduct for media and social media to disallow the dissemination of incitement material". Non-Muslim nations that do not have blasphemy laws, have pointed to abuses of blasphemy laws in Islamic nations, and have disagreed.

Notwithstanding, controversies raised in the non-Muslim world, especially over depictions of Muhammad, questioning issues relating to the religious offense to minorities in secular countries. A key case was the 1989 fatwa against English author Salman Rushdie for his 1988 book entitled The Satanic Verses, the title of which refers to an account that Muhammad, in the course of revealing the Quran, received a revelation from Satan and incorporated it therein until made by Allah to retract it. Several translators of his book into foreign languages have been murdered. In the UK, many supporters of Salman Rushdie and his publishers advocated unrestricted freedom of expression and the abolition of the British blasphemy laws. As a response, Richard Webster wrote A Brief History of Blasphemy in which he discussed freedom to publish books that may cause distress to minorities.

=== Notable modern cases involving individuals ===
==== Assassination of Farag Foda ====
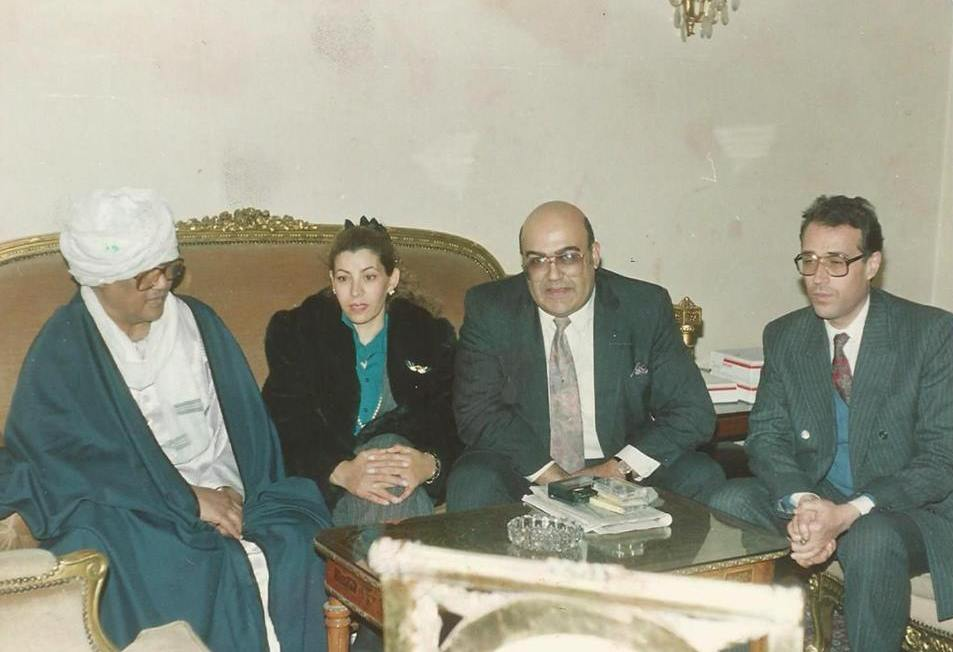
Farag Foda, second from the right

Farag Foda (also Faraj Fawda; 1946 – 9 June 1992), was a prominent Egyptian professor, writer, columnist, and human rights activist. He was assassinated on 9 June 1992 by members of Islamist group al-Gama'a al-Islamiyya after being accused of blasphemy by a committee of clerics (ulama) at Al-Azhar University. In December 1992, his collected works were banned. In a statement claimed responsibility for the killing, Al-Gama'a al-Islamiyya accused Foda of being an apostate from Islam, advocating the separation of religion from the state, and favouring the existing legal system in Egypt rather than the application of Sharia (Islamic law). The group explicitly referred to the Al-Azhar fatwā when claiming responsibility.

==== Imprisonment of Arifur Rahman ====
In September 2007, Bangladeshi cartoonist Arifur Rahman depicted in the daily Prothom Alo a boy holding a cat conversing with an elderly man. The man asks the boy his name, and he replies "Babu". The older man chides him for not mentioning the name of Muhammad before his name. He then points to the cat and asks the boy what it is called, and the boy replies "Muhammad the cat". Bangladesh does not have a blasphemy law but groups said the cartoon ridiculed Muhammad, torched copies of the paper and demanded that Rahman be executed for blasphemy. As a result, Bangladeshi police detained Rahman and confiscated copies of Prothom Alo in which the cartoon appeared.

==== Sudanese teddy bear blasphemy case ====
In November 2007, British schoolteacher Gillian Gibbons, who taught middle-class Muslim and Christian children in Sudan, was convicted of insulting Islam by allowing her class of six-year-olds to name a teddy bear "Muhammad". On 30 November, thousands of protesters took to the streets in Khartoum, demanding Gibbons's execution after imams denounced her during Friday prayers. Many Muslim organizations in other countries publicly condemned the Sudanese over their reactions as Gibbons did not set out to cause offence. She was released into the care of the British embassy in Khartoum and left Sudan after two British Muslim members of the House of Lords met President Omar al-Bashir.

==== Asia Bibi blasphemy case ====
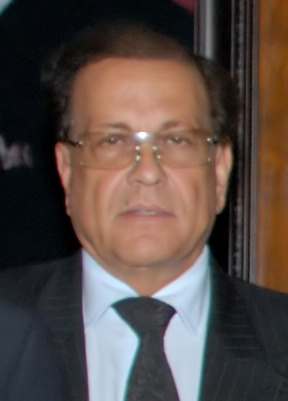
Christian minorities minister Shahbaz Bhatti and Muslim politician Salmaan Taseer (photo) were both assassinated for advocating on Asia Bibi's behalf in her blasphemy case and opposing the blasphemy laws in Pakistan.

The Asia Bibi blasphemy case involved a Pakistani Christian woman, Aasiya Noreen (born c. 1971; better known as Asia Bibi convicted of blasphemy by a Pakistani court, receiving a sentence of death by hanging in 2010. In June 2009, Noreen was involved in an argument with a group of Muslim women with whom she had been harvesting berries after the other women grew angry with her for drinking the same water as them. She was subsequently accused of insulting the Islamic Prophet Muhammad, a charge she denied, and was arrested and imprisoned. In November 2010, a Sheikhupura judge sentenced her to death. If executed, Noreen would have been the first woman in Pakistan to be lawfully killed for blasphemy.

The verdict, which was reached in a district court and needed to be upheld by a superior court, received worldwide attention. Various petitions, including one that received 400,000 signatures, were organized to protest Noreen's imprisonment, and Pope Benedict XVI publicly called for the charges against her to be dismissed. She received less sympathy from her neighbors and Islamic religious leaders in the country, some of whom adamantly called for her to be executed. Christian minorities minister Shahbaz Bhatti and Muslim politician Salmaan Taseer were both assassinated for advocating on her behalf and opposing the blasphemy laws. Noreen's family went into hiding after receiving death threats, some of which threatened to kill Asia if released from prison. Governor Salmaan Taseer and Pakistan's Minority Affairs Minister Shahbaz Bhatti both publicly supported Noreen, with the latter saying, "I will go to every knock for justice on her behalf and I will take all steps for her protection." She also received support from Pakistani political scientist Rasul Baksh Rais and local priest Samson Dilawar. The imprisonment of Noreen left Christians and other minorities in Pakistan feeling vulnerable, and liberal Muslims were also unnerved by her sentencing.

Minority Affairs Minister Shahbaz Bhatti said that he was first threatened with death in June 2010 when he was told that he would be beheaded if he attempted to change the blasphemy laws. In response, he told reporters that he was "committed to the principle of justice for the people of Pakistan" and willing to die fighting for Noreen's release. On 2 March 2011, Bhatti was shot dead by gunmen who ambushed his car near his residence in Islamabad, presumably because of his position on the blasphemy laws. He had been the only Christian member of Pakistan's cabinet.

In January 2011, talking about the Asia Bibi blasphemy case, Pakistani politician Salmaan Taseer expressed views opposing the country's blasphemy law and supporting Asia Bibi. He was then killed by one of his bodyguards, Malik Mumtaz Qadri. After the murder, hundreds of clerics voiced support for the crime and urged a general boycott of Taseer's funeral. The Pakistani government declared three days of national mourning and thousands of people attended his funeral. Supporters of Mumtaz Qadri blocked police attempting to bring him to the courts and some showered him with rose petals. In October, Qadri was sentenced to death for murdering Taseer. Some expressed concerns that the assassinations of Taseer and Bhatti may dissuade other Pakistani politicians from speaking out against the blasphemy laws.

==== Imprisonment of Fatima Naoot ====
In 2014, an Egyptian state prosecutor pressed charges against a former candidate for parliament, writer and poet Fatima Naoot, of blaspheming Islam when she posted a Facebook message which criticized the slaughter of animals during Eid al-Adha, a major Islamic festival. Naoot was sentenced on 26 January 2016 to three years in prison for "contempt of religion." The prison sentence was effective immediately.

==== Murder of Farkhunda Malikzada ====
Farkhunda Malikzada was a 27-year-old Afghan woman who was publicly beaten and slain by a mob of hundreds of people in Kabul on 19 March 2015. Farkhunda had previously been arguing with a mullah named Zainuddin, in front of a mosque where she worked as a religious teacher, about his practice of selling charms at the Shah-Do Shamshira Mosque, the Shrine of the King of Two Swords, a religious shrine in Kabul. During this argument, Zainuddin reportedly falsely accused her of burning the Quran. Police investigations revealed that she had not burned anything. A number of prominent public officials turned to Facebook immediately after the death to endorse the murder. After it was revealed that she did not burn the Quran, the public reaction in Afghanistan turned to shock and anger. Her murder led to 49 arrests; three adult men received twenty-year prison sentences, eight other adult males received sixteen year sentences, a minor received a ten-year sentence, and eleven police officers received one-year prison terms for failing to protect Farkhunda. Her murder and the subsequent protests served to draw attention to women's rights in Afghanistan.

==== Death sentence for Ahmad Al Shamri's atheism ====
Ahmad Al Shamri from the town of Hafar al-Batin, Saudi Arabia, was arrested on charges of atheism and blasphemy after allegedly use social media to state that he renounced Islam and the Prophet Mohammed, he was sentenced to death in February 2015.

==== Death of Mashal Khan ====
Mashal Khan was a Pakistani student at the Abdul Wali Khan University Mardan who was killed by an angry mob in the premises of the university in April 2017 over allegations of posting blasphemous content online.

==== Imprisonment of the governor of Jakarta ====
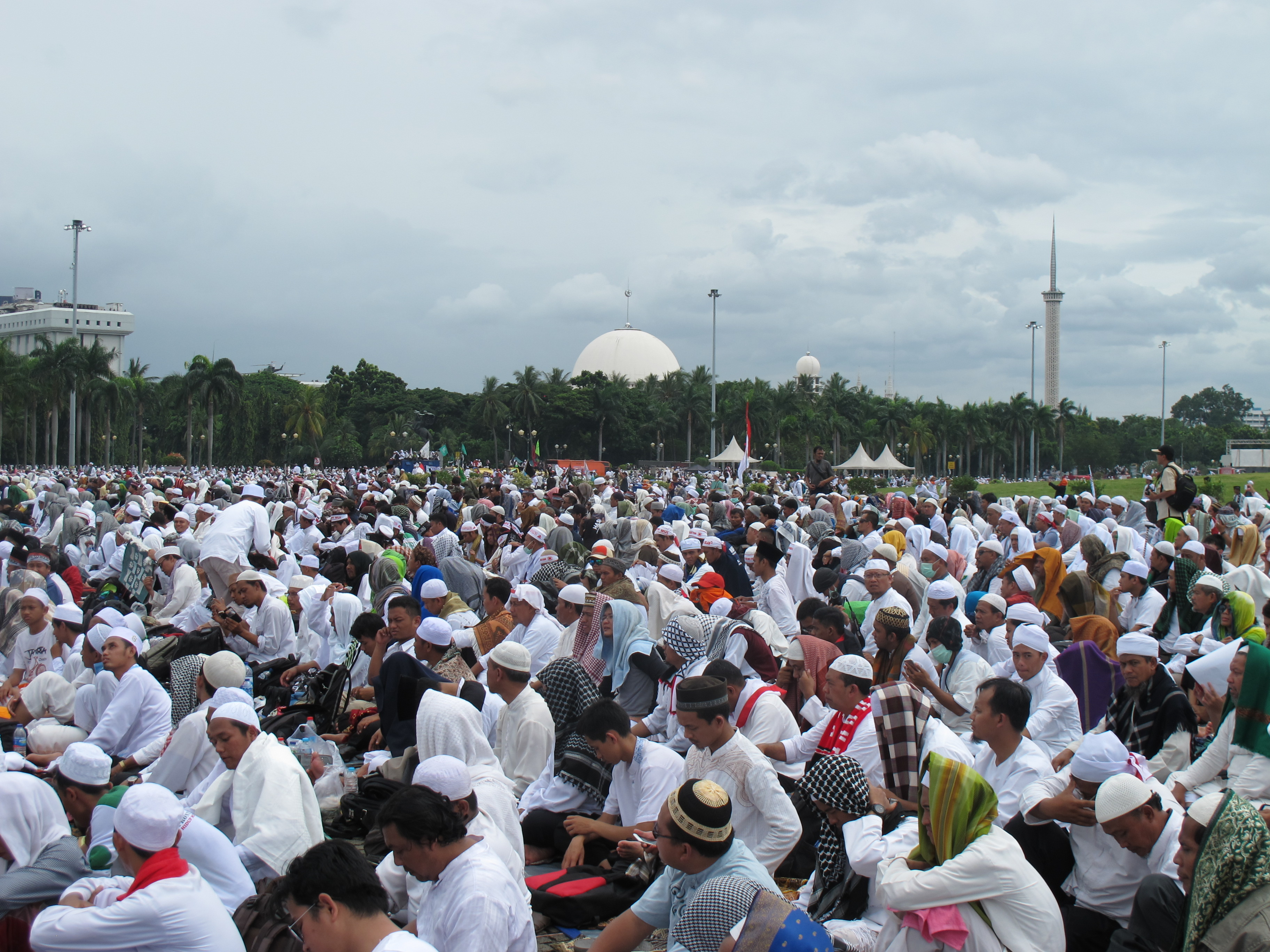
Basuki Tjahaja Purnama was convicted of blasphemy against Islam and sentenced to two years imprisonment. His speech in which he referenced a verse from the Quran sparked wide protests asking for his conviction.

In 2017 in Indonesia, Basuki Tjahaja Purnama during his tenure as the governor of Jakarta, made a controversial speech while introducing a government project at Thousand Islands in which he referenced a verse from the Quran. His opponents criticized this speech as blasphemous, and reported him to the police. He was later convicted of blasphemy against Islam by the North Jakarta District Court and sentenced to two years imprisonment. This decision barred him from serving as the governor of Jakarta, and he was replaced by his deputy, Djarot Saiful Hidayat.

=== Notable international controversies ===
==== Protests against depicting Muhammad ====
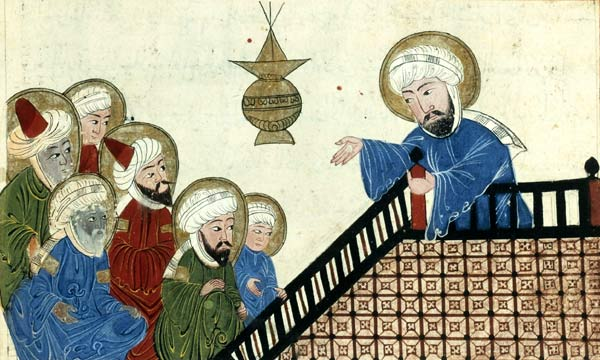
A 17th-century copy of a 14th-century Persian manuscript image of Muhammad prohibiting Nasi', one of the depictions of Muhammad which raised objections

In December 1999, the German news magazine Der Spiegel printed on the same page pictures of "moral apostles" Muhammad, Jesus, Confucius, and Immanuel Kant. Few weeks later, the magazine received protests, petitions and threats against publishing depictions of Muhammad. The Turkish TV station Show TV broadcast the telephone number of an editor who then received daily calls. A picture of Muhammad had been published by the magazine once before in 1998 in a special edition on Islam, without evoking similar protests.

In 2008, several Muslims protested against the inclusion of Muhammad's depictions in the English Wikipedia's Muhammad article. An online petition opposed a reproduction of a 17th-century Ottoman copy of a 14th-century Ilkhanate manuscript image depicting Muhammad as he prohibited Nasīʾ. Jeremy Henzell-Thomas of The American Muslim deplored the petition as one of "these mechanical knee-jerk reactions [which] are gifts to those who seek every opportunity to decry Islam and ridicule Muslims and can only exacerbate a situation in which Muslims and the Western media seem to be locked in an ever-descending spiral of ignorance and mutual loathing."

==== The Muhammad cartoons crisis ====
In September 2005, in the tense aftermath of the assassination of Dutch film director Theo van Gogh, killed for his views on Islam, Danish news service Ritzau published an article discussing the difficulty encountered by the writer Kåre Bluitgen to find an illustrator to work on his children's book The Qur'an and the life of the Prophet Muhammad (Danish: Koranen og profeten Muhammeds liv). He said that three artists declined his proposal, which was interpreted as evidence of self-censorship out of fear of reprisals, which led to much debate in Denmark. Reviewing the experiment, Danish scholar Peter Hervik wrote that it disproved the idea that self‑censorship was a serious problem in Denmark, because the overwhelming majority of cartoonists had either responded positively or refused for contractual or philosophical reasons. Furthermore, the Danish newspaper Politiken stated that they asked Bluitgen to put them in touch with the artists who reportedly declined his proposal, so his claim that none of them dared to work with him could be proved, but that Bluitgen refused, making his initial claim impossible to confirm.

Flemming Rose, an editor at the Danish newspaper Jyllands-Posten, invited professional illustrators to depict Muhammad as an experiment to see how much they felt threatened. The newspaper announced that this was an attempt to contribute to the debate about criticism of Islam and self-censorship. On 30 September 2005, the Jyllands-Posten published 12 editorial cartoons, most of which depicted the Prophet Muhammad. One cartoon by Kurt Westergaard depicted Muhammad with a bomb in his turban, which resulted in the Jyllands-Posten Muhammad cartoons controversy (or Muhammad cartoons crisis) (Danish: Muhammedkrisen) i.e. complains by Muslim groups in Denmark, the withdrawal of the ambassadors of Libya, Saudi Arabia and Syria from Denmark, protests around the world including violent demonstrations and riots in some Muslim countries as well as consumer boycotts of Danish products. Carsten Juste, editor-in-chief at the Jyllands-Posten, claimed the international furor over the cartoons amounted to a victory for opponents of free expression. "Those who have won are dictatorships in the Middle East, in Saudi Arabia, where they cut criminals' hands and give women no rights," Juste told The Associated Press. "The dark dictatorships have won." Commenting the cartoon that initiated the diplomatic crisis, American scholar John Woods expressed worries about Westergaard-like association of the Prophet with terrorism, that was beyond satire and offensive to a vast majority of Muslims. Hervik also deplored that the newspaper's "desire to provoke and insult Danish Muslims exceeded the wish to test the self-censorship of Danish cartoonists."

In Sweden, an online caricature competition was announced in support of Jyllands‑Posten, but foreign minister Laila Freivalds pressured the provider to shut the page down (in 2006, her involvement was revealed to the public and she had to resign).

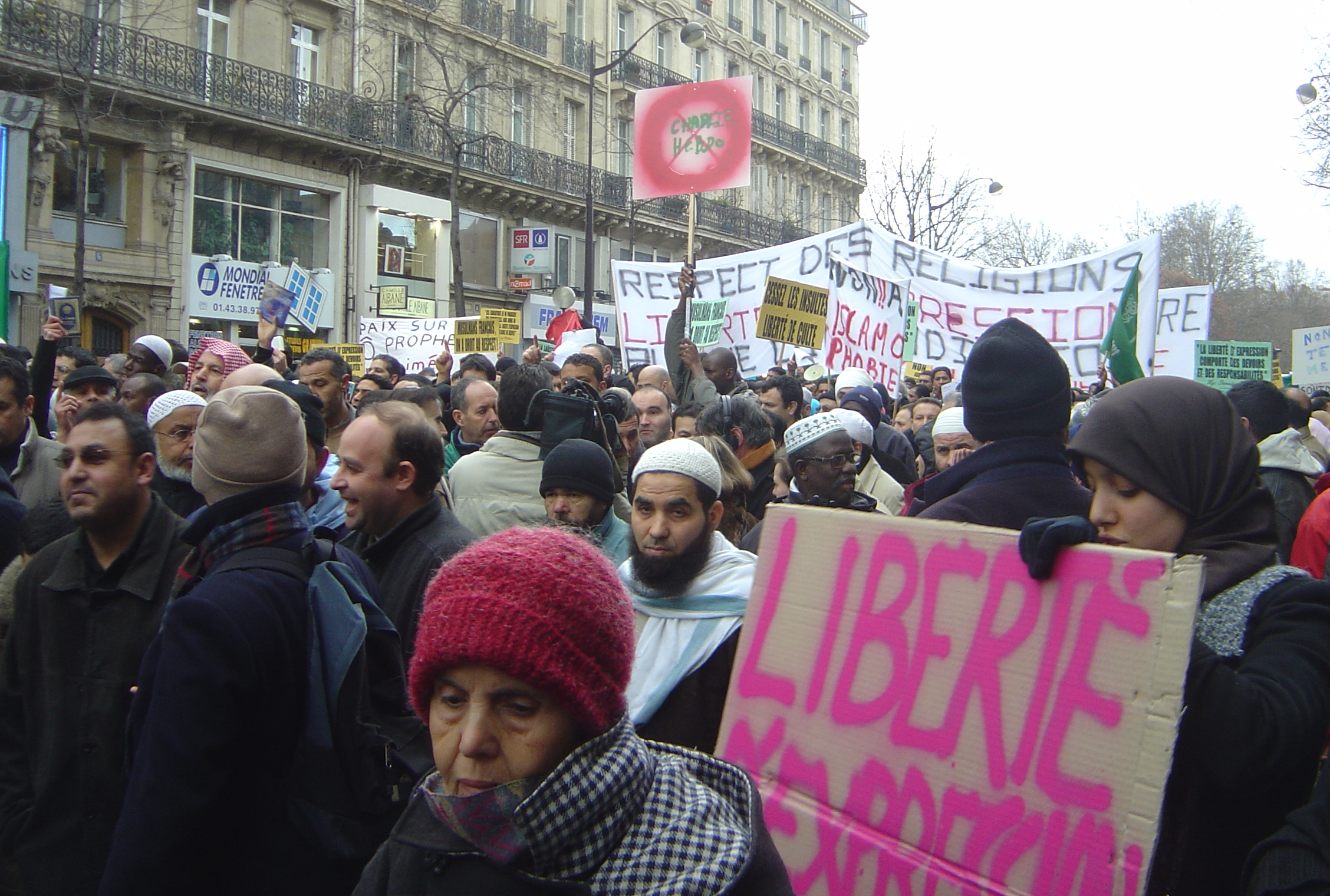
Muslims march in Paris on 11 February 2006 against the publication of caricatures of Muhammad. A sign with "Charlie Hebdo" circled and crossed-out is held aloft in the picture's upper middle.

In France, satirical magazine Charlie Hebdo republished the Jyllands-Posten cartoons of Muhammad. It was taken to court by Islamic organisations under French hate speech laws; it was ultimately acquitted of charges that it incited hatred.

In July 2007, art galleries in Sweden declined to show drawings of artist Lars Vilks depicting Muhammad as a roundabout dog. While Swedish newspapers had published them already, the drawings gained international attention after the newspaper Nerikes Allehanda published one of them on 18 August to illustrate an editorial on the "right to ridicule a religion". This particular publication led to official condemnations from Iran, Pakistan, Afghanistan, Egypt and Jordan, and by the inter‑governmental Organisation of the Islamic Conference.

A depiction of Muhammad for the Everybody Draw Mohammed Day, an event in support of artists threatened with violence for drawing representations of the Islamic Prophet Muhammad

In 2006, the American comedy program South Park, which had previously depicted Muhammad as a superhero ("Super Best Friends)" and has depicted Muhammad in the opening sequence since then, attempted to satirize the Danish newspaper incident. They intended to show Muhammad handing a salmon helmet to Family Guy character Peter Griffin ("Cartoon Wars Part II"). However, Comedy Central who airs the series rejected the scene and its creators reacted by satirizing double standard for broadcast acceptability.

In April 2010, animators Trey Parker and Matt Stone planned to make episodes satirizing controversies over previous episodes, including Comedy Central's refusal to show images of Muhammad following the 2005 Danish controversy. After they faced Internet death threats, Comedy Central modified their version of the episode, obscuring all images and bleeping all references to Muhammad. In reaction, cartoonist Molly Norris created the Everybody Draw Mohammed Day, claiming that if many people draw pictures of Muhammad, threats to murder them all would become unrealistic.

On 2 November 2011, Charlie Hebdo was firebombed right before its 3 November issue was due; the issue was called Charia Hebdo and satirically featured Muhammad as guest‑editor. The editor, Stéphane Charbonnier, known as Charb, and two co-workers at Charlie Hebdo subsequently received police protection. In September 2012, the newspaper published a series of satirical cartoons of Muhammad, some of which feature nude caricatures of him. In January 2013, Charlie Hebdo announced that they would make a comic book on the life of Muhammad.

In March 2013, Al-Qaeda's branch in Yemen, commonly known as Al-Qaeda in the Arabian Peninsula (AQAP), released a hit list in an edition of their English-language magazine Inspire. The list included Kurt Westergaard, Lars Vilks, Carsten Juste, Flemming Rose, Charb and Molly Norris, and others whom AQAP accused of insulting Islam. On 7 January 2015, two masked gunmen opened fire on Charlie Hebdo's staff and police officers as vengeance for its continued caricatures of Muhammad, killing 12 people, including Charb, and wounding 11 others. Jyllands-Posten did not re-print the Charlie Hebdo cartoons in the wake of the attack, with the new editor-in-chief citing security concerns.

==== Kamlesh Tiwari case ====
In October 2019, Kamlesh Tiwari, an Indian politician, was killed in a planned attack in Lucknow, Uttar Pradesh, for his views on Muhammad.

On 2 December 2015, Azam Khan, a politician of the Samajwadi Party, stated that Rashtriya Swayamsevak Sangh members are homosexuals and that is why they do not get married. The next day, Kamlesh Tiwari retaliated to Azam Khan's statement and called Muhammad as the first homosexual in the world. Thousands of Muslims protested in Muzaffarnagar and demanded the death penalty for Tiwari, with some demanding that he be "beheaded" for "insulting" Muhammad. Tiwari was arrested in Lucknow on 3 December 2015 by Uttar Pradesh Police. He was detained under National Security Act by the Samajwadi Party–led state government in Uttar Pradesh. Tiwari spent several months in jail for his comment. He was charged under Indian Penal Code sections 153-A (promoting enmity between groups on the grounds of religion and doing acts prejudicial to maintenance of harmony) and 295-A (deliberate and malicious acts, intended to outrage religious feelings of any class by insulting its religion or religious beliefs). Protest rallies against his statement were held by several Islamic groups in other parts of India, most of them demanding the death penalty.

The protests demanding capital punishment for Tiwari triggered counter-protests by Hindu groups who accused Muslim groups of demanding enforcement of Islamic law of blasphemy in India. His detention under National Security Act was revoked by Allahabad High Court in 2016.

On 18 October 2019, Tiwari was murdered by two Muslim assailants, Farid-ud-din Shaikh and Ashfak Shaikh, in his office-cum-residence at Lucknow. The assailants came dressed in saffron kurtas to give him a sweets box with an address of a sweet shop in Surat city in Gujarat. According to police officials, the assailants kept a revolver and knife inside the sweets box. During the attack, one assailant slit his throat while another fired at him. Tiwari's aide Saurashtrajeet Singh was sent to bring cigarettes for them and when he returned he found Tiwari lying with his throat slit and his body ruptured with wounds. He was declared dead during treatment at a hospital's trauma centre. The post-mortem report revealed that he was stabbed 15 times on the upper part of body from jaws to chest, two deep cut marks on the neck points to attempt to slit his throat and shot once.

==== Innocence of Muslims ====
Innocence of Muslims is an anti-Islamic short film that was written and produced by Nakoula Basseley Nakoula. Two versions of the 14‑minute video were uploaded to YouTube in July 2012, under the titles The Real Life of Muhammad and Muhammad Movie Trailer. Videos dubbed in Arabic were uploaded during early September 2012. Anti-Islamic content had been added in post-production by dubbing, without the actors' knowledge.

What was perceived as denigrating of the Islamic Prophet Muhammad resulted in demonstrations and violent protests against the video to break out on 11 September in Egypt and spread to other Arab and Muslim nations and to some western countries. The protests have led to hundreds of injuries and over 50 deaths. Fatwas calling for the harm of the video's participants have been issued and Pakistani government minister Bashir Ahmad Bilour offered a bounty for the killing of Nakoula, the producer. The film has sparked debates about freedom of speech and Internet censorship.

=== Rimsha Masih blasphemy case ===
Rimsha Masih (Urdu: رمشا مسیح — some early reports used the first name "Rifta" or "Riftah"; born 1998) is a Pakistani girl from Islamabad, who was arrested by the Pakistani police on blasphemy charges in August 2012 when she was 14 years old. The alleged charges included desecrating pages of the Quran (or a book containing verses from the Quran) by burning—a crime punishable by death under Pakistan's blasphemy law. She is a member of Pakistan's Christian minority.

Two weeks after her arrest, the local imam who had reported her to police was arrested on suspicion of planting pages of religious texts in Rimsha's bag. Rimsha was eventually acquitted of all charges. In mid 2013 after months of hiding, Rimsha and her family were able to escape to Canada.

=== Blasphemy in Sweden during Turkish-Sweden tensions ===
In 2023, instances of Quran-burning occurred in Sweden. The most notable of them occurred on 28 June 2023, when 37-year-old Iraqi Assyrian refugee Salwan Momika ripped out and set fire to pages of the Quran outside the Stockholm Mosque. The incident happened amid rising diplomatic tension between the two countries and Turkey's objections to Sweden joining NATO. Turkey had earlier canceled a visit by Sweden's defense minister and is seeking political concessions, including the deportation of critics and Kurds. The act was described by Sweden's Foreign Minister as "appalling" and does not imply government support for the opinion expressed.

== Examples ==
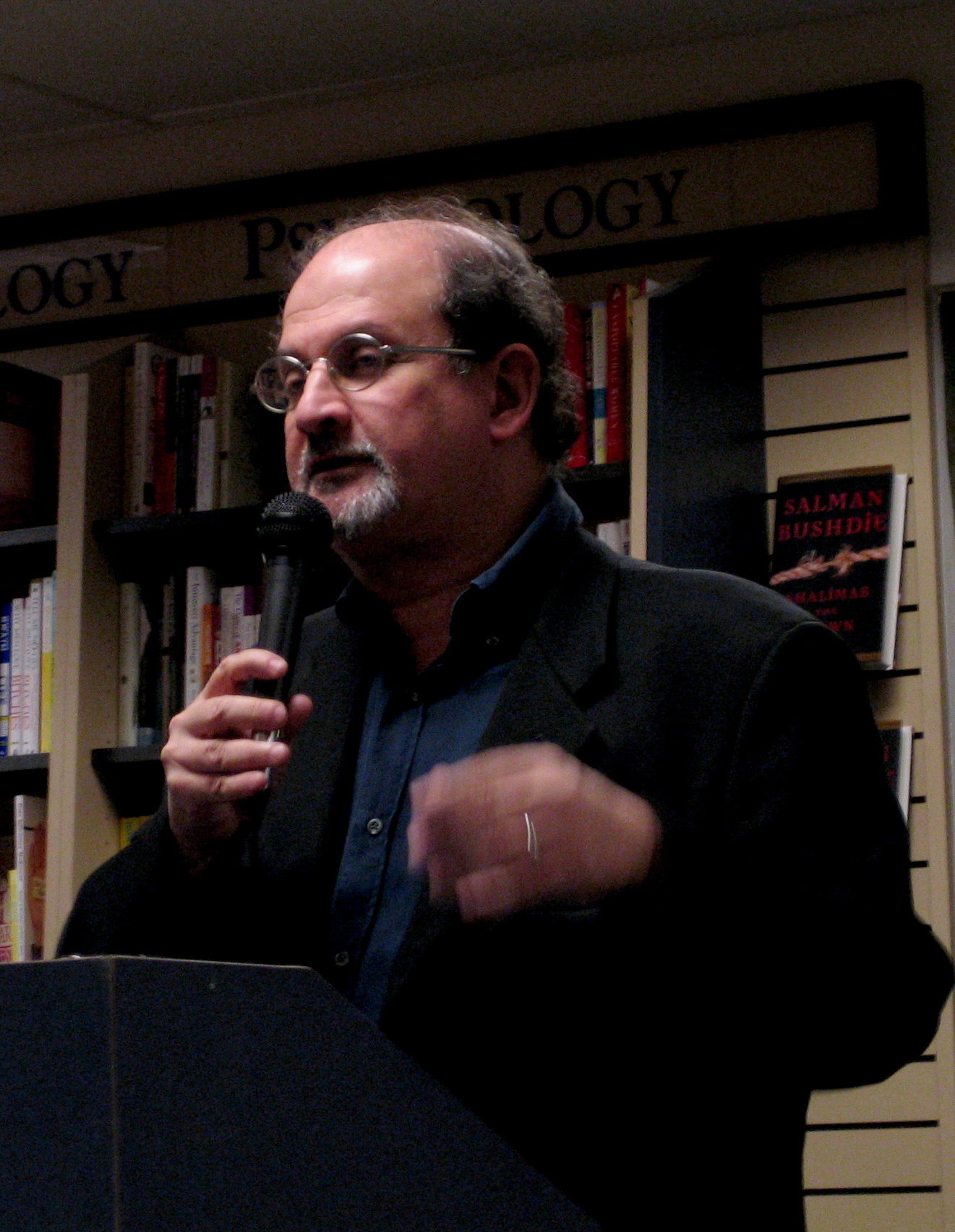
Writer Salman Rushdie was accused of blasphemy by Ayatollah Khomeini, Iran's Supreme Leader, in a fatwā in 1989 calling for his assassination.

A variety of actions, speeches or behavior can constitute blasphemy in Islam. Some examples include insulting or cursing Allah, or Muhammad; mockery or disagreeable behavior towards beliefs and customs common in Islam; criticism of Islam's holy personages. Apostasy, that is, the act of abandoning Islam, or finding faults or expressing doubts about Allah (ta'til) and Qur'an, rejection of Muhammed or any of his teachings, or leaving the Muslim community to become an atheist is a form of blasphemy. Questioning religious opinions (fatwa) and normative Islamic views can also be construed as blasphemous. Improper dress, drawing offensive cartoons, tearing or burning holy literature of Islam, creating or using music or painting or video or novels to mock or criticize Muhammad are some examples of blasphemous acts. In the context of those who are non-Muslims, the concept of blasphemy includes all aspects of infidelity (kufr).

Individuals have been accused of blasphemy or of insulting Islam for a variety of actions and words.

=== Blasphemy against holy personages ===
- speaking ill of Allah.
- finding fault with Muhammad.
- slighting a Prophet who is mentioned in the Qur'an, or slighting a member of Muhammad's family.
- claiming to be a Prophet or a messenger.
- Visual depictions of Muhammad or any other Prophet, or films about Muhammad or other Prophets (Egypt).
- writing Muhammad's name on the walls of a toilet (Pakistan).
- naming a teddy bear Muhammad (Sudan). See Sudanese teddy bear blasphemy case.
- invoking God while committing a forbidden act.

=== Blasphemy against beliefs and customs ===
- finding fault with Islam.
- saying Islam is an Arab religion; prayers five times a day are unnecessary; and the Qur'an is full of lies (Indonesia).
- believing in transmigration of the soul or reincarnation or disbelieving in the afterlife (Indonesia).
- expressing an atheist or a secular point of view or publishing or distributing such a point of view.
- using words that Muslims use because the individuals were not Muslims (Malaysia).
- praying that Muslims become something else (Indonesia).
- finding amusement in Islamic customs (Bangladesh).
- publishing an unofficial translation of the Qur'an (Afghanistan).
- practicing yoga (Malaysia).
- insulting religious scholarship.
- wearing the clothing of Jews or of Zoroastrians.
- claiming that forbidden acts are not forbidden.
- uttering "words of infidelity" (sayings that are forbidden).
- participating in non-Islamic religious festivals.

== See also ==
Islam

- Apostasy in Islam
- Blasphemy law
- Blasphemy law in Afghanistan
- Blasphemy law in Algeria
- Blasphemy law in Bangladesh
- Blasphemy law in Egypt
- Blasphemy law in Indonesia
- Blasphemy law in Iran
- Blasphemy law in Jordan
- Blasphemy law in Malaysia
- Blasphemy in Pakistan
- Blasphemy law in Saudi Arabia
- Blasphemy law in the United Arab Emirates
- Blasphemy law in Yemen
- Islamic extremism
- Mansur Al-Hallaj
- Utaybah bin Abu Lahab

Secular topics

- Blacklash against anti–blasphemy laws
- Belief bias
- Blind faith
- Criticism of religion
- Defamation of religion and the United Nations
- Freedom From Religion
- Freedom of speech
- International Blasphemy Day
- Parody religion
- Religious supremacism
- Category:People executed for blasphemy
