= Lars Vilks Muhammad drawings controversy =

Controversy relating to the publication of depictions of Muhammad

Image by Lars Vilks published in Nerikes Allehanda adjacent to the editorial

The Lars Vilks Muhammad drawings controversy erupted in July 2007 with a series of drawings by Swedish artist Lars Vilks that portrayed the Islamic prophet Muhammad as a roundabout dog (a form of street installation in Sweden). Multiple art galleries in Sweden declined to show the drawings, citing legitimate security concerns and fear of violence. The controversy escalated after the Örebro-based regional newspaper Nerikes Allehanda featured one of the drawings on 18 August as part of an editorial on self-censorship and freedom of religion.

While several other leading Swedish newspapers had previously published the drawings, this particular publication triggered widespread protests from Muslims in Sweden as well as strong diplomatic condemnations from several foreign governments and militant groups including the Islamic State of Iraq, Iran, Pakistan, Afghanistan, Egypt, and Jordan, as well as by the inter-governmental Organisation of the Islamic Conference (OIC). The controversy unfolded about a year and a half after the Jyllands-Posten Muhammad cartoons controversy in Denmark in early 2006.

== Background ==
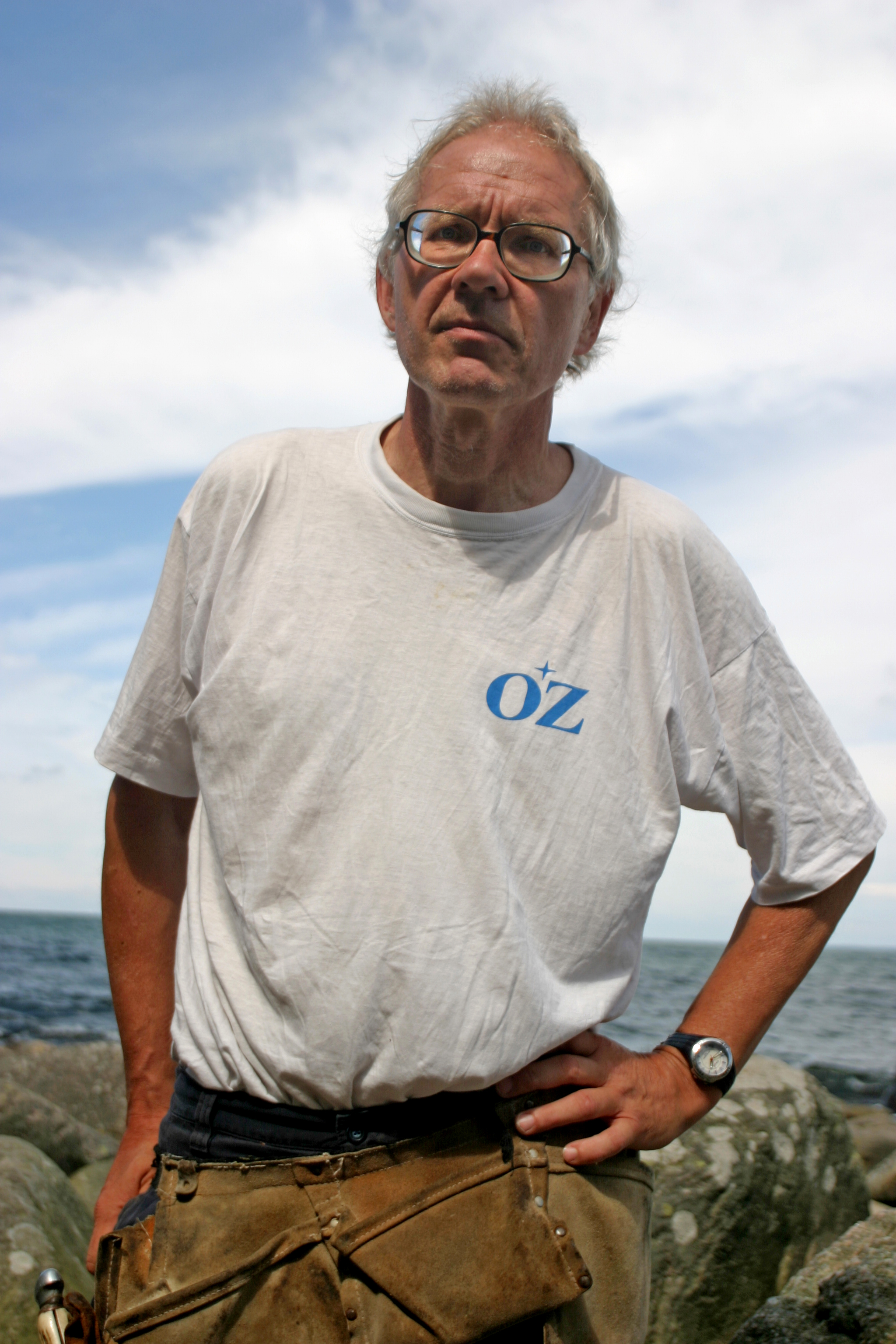
Lars Vilks

On 11 June 2007, Vilks was invited to participate in an art exhibition on the theme "The Dog in Art" (Swedish: Hunden i konsten) that was to be held in the small town of Tällerud in Värmland. Vilks contributed three pen and ink drawings on A4 paper depicting Muhammad as a roundabout dog. At this time, Vilks was already participating with drawings of Muhammad in another exhibition in Vestfossen, Norway, on the theme "Oh, My God". Vilks, as a staunch advocate of institutional art, has stated that his original intention with the drawings was to "probe the persuasive political correctness within the art community's boundaries". According to Vilks, the art and culture communities in Sweden repeatedly criticize the United States and Israel, whereas Muslim values are rarely criticized.

On 20 July, the day before the opening of the exhibition in Tällerud, the organizers opted to withdraw Vilks's drawings from the exhibition citing security concerns and fear of violence from Islamic extremists (see Islam and blasphemy and Islam and animals). Märta Wennerström, the exhibition's organizer, said that at first she "didn't realize the gravity of the situation" and that she made the decision to remove the drawings after consulting with Swedish government agencies and private persons.

Following the first refusal to publish the drawings, Vilks submitted his drawings to the Gerlesborg School of Fine Art in Bohuslän (where he regularly lectures) for a special teachers' exhibition scheduled to be opened on 18 August. On 13 August, however, the school announced that they also had decided to reject the drawings due to security concerns. The second rejection started an intense debate in the Swedish media about self-censorship and freedom of expression.

On 18 August, the Örebro-based regional newspaper Nerikes Allehanda featured one of Vilks's drawings in an editorial on freedom of expression. The editorial upheld "Muslims' right to freedom of religion" but also said it must be permitted to "ridicule Islam's most foremost symbols — just like all other religions' symbols." On the same day, the drawings were also published in several other Swedish newspapers including Aftonbladet, Dagens Nyheter, Expressen and Upsala Nya Tidning.

== Reactions ==
=== International reactions ===
On 27 August, the Swedish chargée d'affaires in Tehran, Gunilla von Bahr, was formally summoned to the Iranian foreign ministry where she received a stern protest from the Iranian government against the publication in Nerikes Allehanda. On 28 August, the President of Iran, Mahmoud Ahmadinejad, commented on the drawings during a press conference. He was quoted by the Islamic Republic News Agency as saying: "Religions call for friendship, equality, justice, peace and respect for divine prophets. The Zionists only pretend to believe in religion. They are fabricating lies. They are perpetrating oppression against the Europeans and putting at risk the prestige of Europe."

On 30 August, the Swedish chargé d'affaires in Islamabad, Lennart Holst, was called upon to the Pakistani Ministry of Foreign Affairs to receive a similar protest from the Pakistani government. The Pakistani Ministry of Foreign Affairs later issued a statement where it condemned the publication "in the strongest terms".According to Dawn, Pakistan's government also place a demand in front of the Swedish government to take an "immediate action" to ensure that such incidents do not happen in the future and to punish those who published the images.

On the same day, the Organisation of the Islamic Conference (OIC), an inter-governmental organization which represents 57 Muslim countries, issued a statement where it strongly condemned the publishing of blasphemous caricatures of Muhammad by Swedish artist Lars Vilks in the Nerikes Allehanda newspaper. The secretary-general of OIC, Ekmeleddin İhsanoğlu, further urged the Swedish government to take "immediate punitive measures against the artist and the publishers of the cartoon and demanded for their unqualified apology".

On 31 August, supporters from Islamist parties in Pakistan burned the Swedish flag in the city of Lahore. In Karachi, others torched an effigy of the Swedish Prime Minister to protest the cartoon.

On 1 September, the Afghan newspaper Kabul Times featured a statement by religious scholars, imams and the Afghan Ministry of Islamic Guidance. The statement denounced the statement and said that "The sold-out enemies of Islam draw the cartoon of the respected Prophet of Islam once more. This has disturbed the Islamic world and aroused the indignation of all Muslims". The statement called for those responsible be handed over to a court for prosecution and punishment.

On 3 September, the Egyptian Ministry of Religious Endowments issued a strong condemnation, saying that "such an irresponsible act is not conducive to friendly ties between the Islamic world and the west". On the same day, also the Jordanian government also expressed its outrage. A spokesperson for the government said that "The publication of this cartoon, which seeks to attack the character of the Prophet Mohammed, is unacceptable, rejected and condemned".

=== Domestic reactions ===
On 25 August, a group of about 60 Muslims held a demonstration outside Nerikes Allehanda's office in Örebro to protest against the publication.

On 31 August, Swedish Prime Minister Fredrik Reinfeldt addressed the issue and said: "I think it's important to say two things. First, we are eager to ensure that Sweden remains a country in which Muslims and Christians, people who believe in God and people who don't believe in God, can live side by side in a spirit of mutual respect [...] We are also eager to stand up for freedom of expression, which is enshrined in the constitution and comes naturally to us, and which ensures that we do not make political decisions about what gets published in the newspapers. I want to make sure we keep things that way." The same day, around 300 demonstrators – led by the Islamic Cultural Centre in Örebro – gathered outside the offices of Nerikes Allehanda to stage a protest against the newspaper's publication.

On 7 September, Prime Minister Fredrik Reinfeldt held talks with the ambassadors from 22 Muslim countries to discuss the issue. Reinfeldt said that he had "explained how Swedish society works and that we don't have elected representatives making editorial decisions", adding that "this is an open country, a tolerant country". Prior to the meeting, Egyptian ambassador Mohamed Sotouhi indicated, according to the news agency TT, that he and a group of fellow ambassadors had agreed on a list of measures that Sweden needed to take and to present it to the Prime Minister. "We want to see action, not just nice words. We have to push for a change in the law", he said.

Following the meeting however, Reinfeldt denied that any such list had been presented to him. According to the Syrian Arab News Agency, a statement was conveyed from the Swedish embassy in Damascus to Syria's Grand Mufti Ahmad Bader Hassoun in which Reinfeldt "extended his apologies at the incident which has distressed and outraged Muslims, calling against instigating or offending other religions". The Swedish government has remained silent on this statement.

Also on 7 September, a group of about 550 Muslims gathered outside the offices of the newspaper Upsala Nya Tidning in Uppsala, to protest against the newspaper's publication of the cartoons.

== Threats and attacks ==
One of Vilks's original three drawings, depicting Muhammad as a roundabout dog.

Following the publication in Nerikes Allehanda, the Swedish police enhanced security around the newspaper's headquarters and some of its employees have been forced to use bodyguards after receiving explicit death threats. Vilks himself has also received numerous death threats. One Muslim woman in western Sweden was detained on charges of issuing a death threat (Swedish: olaga hot) against Vilks in an e-mail. The woman confirmed in police interrogation that she had written the mail and said that she did not have any regrets about it. On 6 September, one actual roundabout dog created by Vilks and local children was vandalized and set alight as an apparent threat.

On 15 September, it was reported that the group Islamic State of Iraq had placed a bounty of at least $100,000 on the head of Lars Vilks and $50,000 on Ulf Johansson, editor-in-chief of Nerikes Allehanda. The statement was found in an audio file on an Islamist website and was read by a person who identified himself as Abu Omar al-Baghdadi, the purported head of the Islamic State of Iraq. "We announce a reward of $100,000 to anyone who kills this infidel criminal. This reward will be raised to $150,000 if he is slaughtered like a lamb," the statement said. The statement also threatened attacks on Swedish companies unless unspecified "crusaders" issued an apology. Vilks responded to the statement by saying: "I suppose this makes my art project a bit more serious. It's also good to know how much one is worth".

The United States-based SITE Institute has reported that websites run by militant Islamists have listed the names of over 100 Swedish companies with addresses, maps and logos. The websites called for their readers to boycott these firms and "take revenge" on Sweden for the publication of the drawings.

The European Council for Fatwa and Research (ECFR) and the Federation of Islamic Organizations in Europe (FIOE) both condemned the death threats against Vilks and Johansson. ECFR also said it planned to issue a "counter fatwa" against the threats.

The World Association of Newspapers (WAN), which represents over 18,000 newspapers around the world, issued a statement where it condemned the death threats and expressed support for Nerikes Allehanda in its right to publish the drawing.

=== 9 March 2010 arrests ===
On 9 March 2010, seven people were detained in the Republic of Ireland over an alleged plot to assassinate Vilks. The suspects were originally from Morocco and Yemen and had refugee status. Of the seven, three men and two women were arrested in Waterford and Tramore and another man and woman at Ballincollig, near Cork. Garda Síochána (the Irish police force), which conducted the operation with support from the counter-terror Special Detective Unit and the National Support Services, confirming the suspects range in age from mid 20s to late 40s. The Garda Síochána also revealed that throughout the investigation they had been "working closely with law enforcement agencies in the United States and in a number of European countries".

The same day, Colleen R. LaRose from the Philadelphia, US, suburbs, had her federal indictment unsealed charging her with trying to recruit Islamic terrorists to murder Vilks.

=== 2010 Stockholm bombings ===
An emailed threat sent to a news agency and to the Swedish Security Service occurred made reference to this incident. Afterwards, two bombs exploded, injuring two people and claiming the life of the would-be attacker.

=== 2010 Copenhagen terror plot ===
At the time of the December 2010 terror arrests, Lars Vilks' home page was targeted by a cyberattack. According to Vilks' blog, the hacker declared the attacks would be continued with no end and that the targets are Vilks, Kurt Westergaard, and Geert Wilders.

=== 2013 Al-Qaeda's most wanted ===
In 2013, cartoonist Stéphane "Charb" Charbonnier was designated to Al-Qaeda's most wanted list, alongside Lars Vilks and three Jyllands-Posten staff members: Kurt Westergaard, Carsten Juste, and Flemming Rose.

=== 2015 Copenhagen shootings ===
On 14 February 2015, gunfire erupted at a public meeting in Denmark attended by Vilks, resulting in one civilian fatality and three policemen injured. The attacker fled after a brief gunfight with police and was later shot dead the next day after carrying out another shooting at a Jewish synagogue, killing one person and injuring two policemen.

== See also ==
- Charlie Hebdo shooting
- Jyllands-Posten Muhammad cartoons controversy
- Islam in Sweden
- Depictions of Muhammad
- Islam and animals
- Islam and blasphemy
