= Blasphemy law in Indonesia =

Blasphemy law in Indonesia (Indonesian: Undang-undang Penistaan Agama) is the legislation, presidential decrees, and ministerial directives that prohibit blasphemy in Indonesia.

Blasphemy laws in the country have been adapted from the statutes of the Dutch East Indies, criminalizing those who deviate from the religious tenets of one of Indonesia's six recognized religions (Islam, Protestantism, Catholicism, Hinduism, Buddhism and Confucianism); from Presidential decrees, and been encouraged in the 21st century by "ascendant Islamic conservatives ... pushing hard-line policies."

As the majority of Indonesians (over 80%) are Muslims, most blasphemy cases and convictions in recent years have been for blasphemy against Islam. Since the early 2000s, Blasphemy prosecutions and convictions have risen in the country, but been criticized (by Amnesty International) for targeting religious minority groups and Islamic dissenters. Among the acts that have led to incarceration include reciting Muslim prayers in the Indonesian language; using "paranormal healing methods" in drug and cancer treatment; complaining about the volume of a mosque loudspeaker issuing call to prayer near the perpetrator's home; eating pork rinds in a social media video; serving free alcohol beverages for customers whose names were Muhammad and Maria. Several government officials and prominent political leaders interacted in public forums and seminars with religious leaders and interfaith groups such as the Indonesian Anti-Discrimination Movement and National People's Solidarity (Solidaritas Nusa Bangsa) in order to combat discrimination based on religious identity.

== Basis in Indonesian law and society ==
Blasphemy laws in the country have been adapted from the statutes of the Dutch East Indies, the colony of the Netherlands that became Indonesia. The statutes apply to those who deviate from the religious tenets of one of Indonesia's six official religions: Islam, Protestantism, Catholicism, Hinduism, Buddhism and Confucianism.

=== Criminal Code ===
Indonesia's Criminal Code prohibits blasphemy. The Code's Article 156(a) targets those who deliberately, in public, express feelings of hostility, hatred, or contempt against religions with the purpose of preventing others from adhering to any religion, and targets those who disgrace a religion. The penalty for violating Article 156(a) is a maximum of five years' imprisonment. The blasphemy law has been "on the statute books since 1965 but was rarely used" before the end of the rule of President Soeharto.

=== Presidential decree ===
Article 156(a) is the complement to a decree enacted by President Sukarno and implemented by President Soeharto, namely, Presidential Decree No. 1/PNPS/1965 on the Prevention of Blasphemy and Abuse of Religions. Article 1 of the decree prohibits the "deviant interpretation" of religious teachings, and mandates the President to dissolve any organisation practicing deviant teachings. Until the end of the 20th century, Indonesian society was tolerant of Islam (87% of the population), Roman Catholicism, Protestantism, Hinduism, Sikhism, Buddhism, Judaism, and animism. The Government was tolerant of persons with no religion, but does not count them in any census.

=== Constitution ===
Article 29 of Indonesia's Constitution stipulates "the state is based on the belief in the one supreme God." The Constitution does not dictate which religion's version of God should be worshipped. In January 2006, the Ministry of Religious Affairs accorded official status to six religions: Islam, Catholicism, Protestantism, Buddhism, Hinduism and Confucianism. On 9 December 2006, the House of Representatives passed a new civil registration bill requiring citizens to identify themselves on government ID cards as a member of one of the six religions.

=== Indonesian Ulema Council ===
The Government formed a body of Muslim advisors, the Indonesian Ulema Council (MUI) in 1975, and continues to fund and appoint its members. The MUI is not formally a government body but it is influential. The Government considers the MUI's fatwa when making decisions or drafting legislation. In July 2005, the MUI issued a fatwa that condemned the sect of Ahmadiyya as a heresy. In June 2008, the Ministry of Religious Affairs and the Home Ministry issued a Joint Ministerial Letter regarding the Ahmadiyya. The letter told authorities to restrict Ahmadiyya activities to private worship, and to prevent Ahmadi Muslims from proselytising. Provincial governors in West Sumatra, South Sumatra, and West Nusa Tenggara banned all Ahmadiyya activity.

== Conflict ==
Indonesia's laws and policies have produced many instances where members of one religion have persecuted the members of other religions or of other sects. Starting around the year 2000, the Islamic revival has reportedly "nurtured a small but growing number of groups espousing intolerance and extremism under the banner of Islamic orthodoxy." The authorities have not brought to justice many extremists perpetrators of crimes, crimes that are commonly justified by the perpetrators as actions against hatred, heresy, blasphemy, or deviance.

In October 2009, a group of petitioners, including some human rights groups, requested that Indonesia's Constitutional Court review the 1965 Law on Blasphemy. On 19 April 2010, the Court announced its refusal to make the review. "If the Blasphemy Law was scrapped before a new law was enacted ... it was feared that misuses and contempt of religion would occur and trigger conflicts in society," Justice Akil Mochtar said. The Court offered an interpretation of the Law. The interpretation says the state recognises six religions, and "leaves alone" the followers of other religions.

== Selected cases ==
=== 2005-2009 ===
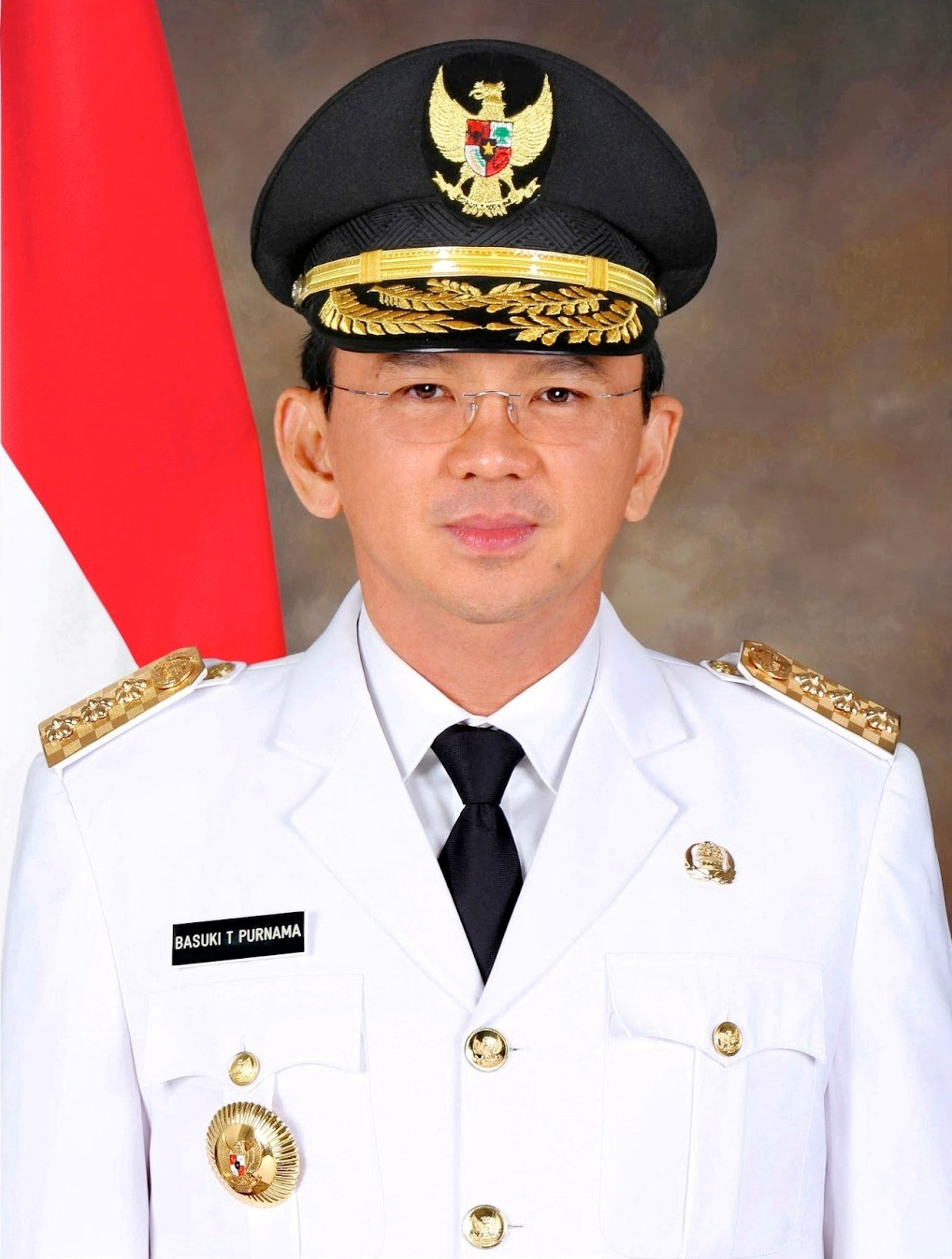
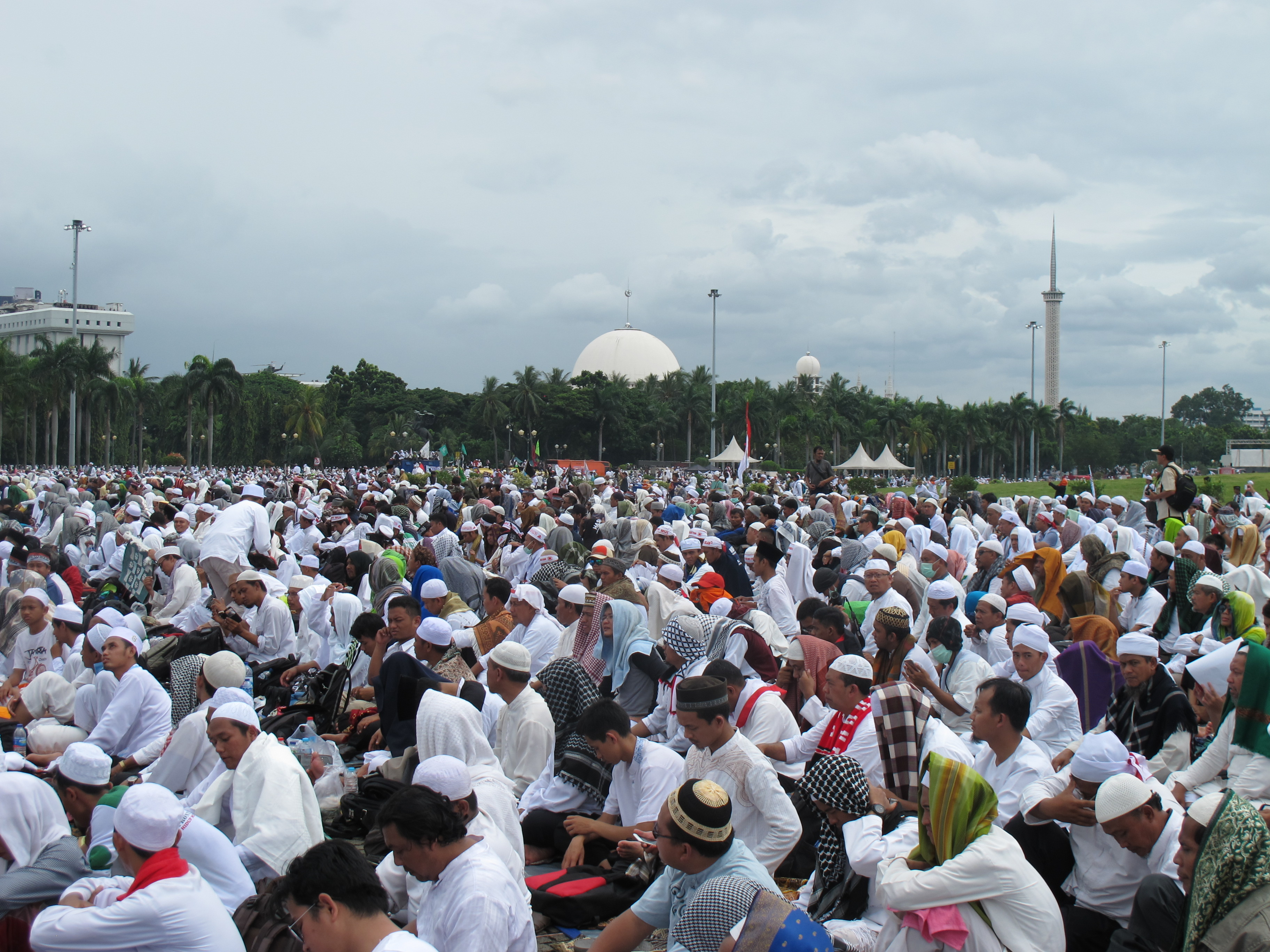
Basuki Tjahaja Purnama (left) was convicted of blasphemy against Islam and sentenced to two years' imprisonment. His speech in which he referenced a verse from the Quran sparked wide protests asking for his conviction.
- In June 2005, police charged a lecturer at the Muhammadiyah University in Palu for heresy. The police held the lecturer for five days before placing him under house arrest after two thousand persons protested against his published editorial: "Islam, A Failed Religion." The editorial, among other things, highlighted the spread of corruption in Indonesia. The lecturer was released from house arrest and was dismissed by the university.
- In August 2005, East Java's Malang District Court sentenced Muhammad Yusman Roy to two years' imprisonment for reciting Muslim prayers in Indonesian, which, according to the Indonesian Ulema Council, tarnished the purity of Arabic-based Islam. Roy was released from prison on 9 November 2006 after serving eighteen months of his sentence.
- In September 2005, an East Java court sentenced each of six drug and cancer treatment counselors at an East Java treatment center to five years in prison and an additional three years in prison for violating key precepts of Islam by using paranormal healing methods. A local MUI edict characterised the center's methods as heretical. Police arrested the counselors while they tried to defend themselves from hundreds of persons who raided the center's headquarters.
- In October 2005, police in Central Sulawesi raided their neighborhood Mahdi sect after locals from other villages complained that sect followers were not fasting or not performing ritual prayers during Ramadan. Three policemen and two sect members died in the clash. Local courts tried five Mahdi members for killing the police. In January 2006, the Mahdi members were convicted and sentenced to between nine and twelve years in prison.
- In November 2005, local police on the island of Madura arrested a man for denigrating a religion because he publicly professed a nontraditional version of Islam. A court sentenced the man to two-and-a-half years' imprisonment.
- In May 2006, the press reported that the Banyuwangi, East Java regional legislature voted to oust from office Banyuwangi's Regent, Ratna Ani Lestari. Those in favor of the ouster accused Ratna, a Muslim by birth, of blaspheming Islam by practicing a different religion from the one stated on her identity card. Ratna's supporters stated that she was the target of a religiously motivated smear campaign because of her marriage to a Hindu.
- On 28 June 2006, the Polewali, South Sulawesi state court sentenced Sumardi Tappaya, a Muslim and a high school religious teacher, to six months in prison for heresy after a relative accused him of whistling during prayers. The local MUI declared the whistling deviant.
- On 10 April 2007, police in the town of Pasuruan, East Java, arrested two men, Rochamim (or Rohim) and Toyib. Toyib was a follower of Rochamim who, according to local residents, said things such as Islam is an Arab religion; prayers five times a day are unnecessary; and the Quran is full of lies. The police charged Toyib under Article 156(a) because he was telling others what Rochamim said.
- In April 2007, police in Malang, East Java, detained forty-two Protestant Christians for disseminating a "prayer video" that instructs individuals to put the Quran on the ground, and to pray for the conversion of Indonesia's Muslim political leaders. In September 2007, a local court found each of those detained guilty of insulting religion, and sentenced each to five years in prison.
- On 11 November 2007, the Supreme Court of Indonesia sentenced Abdul Rahman, a senior member of the Lia Eden sect (Eden Community), to three years in prison for blasphemy because he claimed to be a reincarnation of Muhammad.
- In April 2008, a court sentenced Ahmad Moshaddeq, the leader of a sect called Al-Qiyadah al-Islamiyah, to four years in prison for committing blasphemous acts. On 2 May 2008, Padang District Court sentenced Dedi Priadi and Gerry Lufthi Yudistira, also members of the Al-Qiyadah al-Islamiyah sect, to three years in prison under Article 156(a).
- On 9 December 2008, hundreds of Muslim rioters damaged sixty-seven houses, a church, and a community hall, and injured five people in Masohi, Central Maluku. The rioters were allegedly angry that a Christian school teacher, Wilhelmina Holle, had allegedly said something blasphemous during an after-class tutorial at an elementary school. The police arrested Holle for blasphemy. The police arrested two Muslim men for inciting violence.
- On 2 June 2009, the Central Jakarta District Court convicted Lia Eden, also known as Lia Aminuddin or Syamsuriati, of blasphemy. The court accepted that Eden had proselytised the religion she founded, known as Salamullah. The court sentenced her to two years and six months in prison. Eden had already served sixteen months for the same offence because of the same court's sentence on 29 June 2006. In 1997, the MUI had issued an edict declaring Eden's religion deviant. Lia's right-hand man, Wahyu Andito Putro Wibisono, who was also accused of the crime, was given a two-year prison sentence.

=== 2010-current ===
- On 6 May 2010, a court sentenced Bakri Abdullah to one year in jail for blasphemy because the 70-year-old said he was a prophet and had visited heaven in 1975 and 1997.
- In January 2012, an Indonesian man named Alexander Aan who said on Facebook that God did not exist is facing jail, as atheism is reportedly "a violation of Indonesian law under the founding principles of the country".
- In May 2017, Basuki Tjahaja Purnama during his tenure as the governor of Jakarta, made a controversial speech while introducing a government project at Thousand Islands in which he referenced a verse from the Quran. His opponents criticised this speech as blasphemous, and reported him to the police. He was later convicted of blasphemy against Islam by the North Jakarta District Court and sentenced to two years' imprisonment. This decision barred him from serving as the governor of Jakarta, and he was replaced by his deputy, Djarot Saiful Hidayat. According to Al Jazeera, the charges against him were "widely seen as politically motivated".
- In May 2018 Abraham Ben Moses, also known as Saifuddin Ibrahim, a Christian cleric who converted from Islam, was sentenced to 4 years in court for religious defamation and fined 50 million rupiah for proselytising his Christian faith to a Muslim.
- In August 2018, Meiliana, a Buddhist woman was sentenced to 18 months in prison for religious blasphemy. Meliana was accused of blasphemy against Islam for her complaint in July 2016 about the loudspeaker volume of a mosque near her house in Tanjungbalai City, North Sumatra Province. Her comment triggered the worst anti-Chinese riot in the country since 1998, with Muslims who claimed to have been offended by her words. Several Buddhist temples were burned or ransacked in Tanjungbalai. Over a dozen people were sentenced to one to four months in prison for their roles in the riot. Human rights activists have criticised the law enforcers for prosecuting Meiliana. After the process, the judge Wahyu Prasetyo Wibowo in charge of the case, was apprehended by the Corruption Eradication Commission in an investigation into bribery allegedly involving Medan court officials. In April 2019 the court rejected Meliana's appeal.
- In December 2021, Indonesian police arrested Joseph Suryadi for insulting Muhammad in a WhatsApp group chat.
- In January 2022, South Jakarta Court sentenced Yahya Waloni, a Muslim preacher, for 5 months in prison for calling Saint Stephen "tetanus" (bacterial infection causing muscle spasms), and Roh Kudus (Holy Spirit) as Roh Kudis (translated to English as "spirit of scabies").
- In March 2022, Indonesian National Police charged Ben Moses or known as Saifuddin Ibrahim, a Christian pastor that converted from Muslim, for blasphemy after the pastor stated that some verses of Quran should be removed. Saifuddin is currently located in United States and Indonesian police claimed that they are working with the FBI to arrest the pastor for blasphemy. Ibrahim has been imprisoned before in 2018 for proselytising his Christian faith.
- In April 2022, Ciamis District Court sentenced Muhammad Kace, a Muslim that converted to Christianity, for 10 years in prison after stating that the followers of Muhammad are followers of jinn. On the first night in prison, Kace is beaten and smeared with feces by other prisoners, led by Police Inspector General Napoleon, a police officer that is also in prison for corruption case. Napoleon, a Muslim, claimed that he had religious rights to attack Kace. The High Court in June 2022 reduced his sentence to 6 years. In May 2022, despite being indicted with corruption and charged with the beating of Kace, Napoleon has not been fired by Indonesian National Police as his trial has not been finished yet.
- In June 2022, the police arrested and charged 6 staff members of Holywings, a night club, for giving free alcohol beverages for customers that are named Muhammad and Maria.
- In August 2023, police arrested a 77-year old cleric and educator, Panji Gumilang, on charges including blasphemy and hate speech after his Islamic boarding school provoked protests for allowing women to preach and pray beside men and allowing women to become imams and preach. Indonesian police arrested Gumilang, who manages the Al-Zaytun boarding school in the district of Indramayu in West Java, after outraged conservative groups led public protests against his practices.
- In September 2023, TikTok influencer Lina Lutfiawati was sentenced by a court in the city of Palembang to two years in prison and fined the equivalent of $16,269 (250 million rupiah) for blasphemy after publishing a video of her eating pork rinds several months earlier. (Eating pork is forbidden in Islam.) The court found her guilty of deliberately “spread[ing] information that was intended to incite hate or individual/group enmity based on religion” Lutfiawati, who is known on TikTok for "eating delectable meals", expressed surprise at the sentence as she had apologized "many times" for the act, saying “I know that I am wrong, but I did not expect this punishment”.
- In October 2023, a social media influencer, Fikri Murtadha, were sentenced to six years of imprisonment by a court in the city of Medan, after creating a jokes that compares Christians to sheep. He also stated that he will go to every single church with a Bluetooth speaker and play the intro of Shaun the Sheep.

== See also ==
- Apostasy in Islam
- Blasphemy
- Freedom of religion in Indonesia
- Sharia § Democracy and human rights
- State religion
- Freedom of religion by country § Indonesia
- Irreligion in Indonesia
