= Lynching of Mashal Khan =

2017 murder in Pakistan

- Location: Mardan, Khyber Pakhtunkhwa, Pakistan
- Date: 13 April 2017; 9 years ago (CST)
- Target: Mashal Khan and two other students
- Attack type: Mob killing based on false accusations and rumors
- Weapons: Gun, sticks, stones
- Deaths: One (Mashal Khan)
- Injuries: One (Abdullah)
- Perpetrators: Abdul Wali Khan University students and staffs
- Charges: 1 awarded the death penalty 7 awarded life imprisonment 25 awarded four-year jail sentences
- Convicted: 35

Mashal Khan (Pashto: مشال خان) was a student at the Abdul Wali Khan University Mardan, Pakistan who was killed by an angry mob in the premises of the university on 13 April 2017, over allegations of posting blasphemous content online. Following investigations, the Inspector General Police later stated "We did not find any concrete evidence under which [a blasphemy] investigation or legal action can be launched against Mashal, Abdullah or Zubair". Mashal's friend Abdullah stated to the police in writing that both Mashal and Abdullah were devout Muslims, but were actively denouncing mismanagement by the university and had previously led protests against it.

Following the death of Khan, at least 61 suspects were identified. 57 of the 61 suspected were arrested and prosecuted. 31 were convicted and sentenced on 7 February 2018. One culprit was awarded the death penalty, five were awarded life-time imprisonment and 25 other culprits were awarded four years jail sentence. 26 suspects were acquitted in the case because of lack of evidence. Four suspects were on the run, who later surrendered to the police in June 2018. Later on 21 March 2019, two more culprits in Mashal Khan case were awarded life imprisonment by the Anti-Terrorism Court (ATC). Mashal Khan's father, speaking to media on 21 March 2019, claimed that he was satisfied with Anti-Terrorism Court (ATC) verdict.

== Biography ==
Khan completed his college in the Institute of Computer and Management Sciences on a scholarship and received good marks.

He then received a scholarship to study in a university in Russia where he studied engineering for one year. He then returned to Pakistan without completing his studies due to the family's limited financial resources. Upon returning to Pakistan, he enrolled in the department of journalism at Abdul Wali Khan University Mardan and was planning to do a Master's in Mass Media and Journalism and was also preparing for his civil services exams.

His father told DAWN that "Mashal was devoted to his studies and would study for 15 hours a day. He believed education was essential for a full life and encouraged his brother and sisters to study as well. His father added that Mashal was a "peaceful, tolerant person." and that he wrote poetry in Pashto. Khan had one brother and two sisters and was 23 years old at the time of his murder. Geo News reported that his teacher told it "Mashal was a humanist, he was into socialism and Sufism". A teacher described Khan as an engaged and thoughtful student. "He was brilliant and inquisitive, always complaining about the political system of the country, but I never heard him saying anything controversial against the religion."

== Incident ==
=== Background ===
National politics and blasphemy

In March 2017, the Prime Minister of Pakistan Nawaz Sharif supported a crackdown on blasphemous material posted on social media and described blasphemy as an "unpardonable offence".

Mashal Khan criticisms of AWK University's administrators

Before his death Mashal Khan criticized the Abdul Wali Khan University but none of his comments mentioned religion or contained blasphemy. He revealed that the vice-chancellor never attended the university and students were forced to study in uncertainty of whether or not they would receive the degrees for which they were studying. He criticised teachers, accused them of bureaucracy and said that a single faculty member was in charge of multiple responsibilities. According to him "everyone in authority is a thief here." The way the university collected outstanding dues was also criticised as it charged students Rs. 25,000, while other universities only collected Rs. 5,000.

=== Mob and murder ===
13 April announcement, as published by the Abdul Wali Khan University Mardan on its April 2017's online board. The announcement was later modified and republished on 14 April, with a red "WITHDRAWN" stamp, the webpage was later deleted on 25 April.

On 13 April 2017, the assistant registrar posted an official notice on the online board announcing that three students were under investigation for blasphemous activities, and had been suspended:

I am directed to notify that the following Inquiry Committee has been constituted to probe into the matter of blasphemous activities carried by the students of Department of Journalism namely, Mr. Abdullah, Mr. Mashal and Mr. Zubair. Further, the mentioned students are hereby rusticated and their entry into the premises of the University (all campuses) is banned until further orders

— 13 April 2017. Assistant Registrar, Abdul Wali Khan University Mardan

A large group of students formed into a mob, accusing these students of running a Facebook page where Mashal was allegedly publishing blasphemous material. Mashal was killed inside the premises of the Abdul Wali Khan University Mardan where he was a student of mass communication. Khan's death was filmed through mobile phones and was shared on social media. At least 25 policemen were present in the university premises when Khan was killed.

He was in the hostel of the university when he was stripped naked and severely beaten by a group of students and then shot. He succumbed to his injuries. Graphic video footage of the lynching showed Khan was lying on the floor; his body bore marks of severe torture and was not moving. The mob was seen kicking his lifeless body and beating it with wooden planks. He was also thrown from the second floor of the building. Several more videos emerged later which showed him alive and the mob mercilessly attacking him. Deputy Inspector General of Police said the mob wanted to burn the body of Khan after he was dead.

It was reported that some leaders of the student body were part of the mob that attacked Khan. A senior police officer said "Hundreds of people were involved and Khan was badly tortured after being shot at a close range. He was beaten with sticks, bricks and hands."

An eyewitness at the scene of the incident said Khan was attacked because he was believed to be promoting the Ahmadi faith on Facebook. Reports say a university administrator and several leaders of the university's student body were part of the attacking mob. An unknown official at the university said "Khan was disliked by other students for his liberal and secular views." At least 20 police officers were present at the scene, but they were unable to control the situation. The university campus was shut down following his death and its hostels were vacated to avoid a further escalation of violence.

== Mashal Khan's funeral ==
On the following day (14 April), Mashal Khan's funeral was led by his father, a local poet. Most neighbours kept away from the funeral, as threats made earlier by a local to anyone attending led them to fear follow-up attacks from religious mobs. Some elders nevertheless joined, calling over neighbours to show support and a few dozen people eventually joined the procession. In the following days, as information and national support emerged, neighbours expressed regret for not being able to protect Mashal nor supporting the Khans more on the day of the funeral.

== Investigation and arrests ==
Following the death of Khan, at least 61 people were arrested.

=== Initial investigation ===
According to police investigations, Mashal Khan had not carried out any blasphemous action. The Inspector General Police stated "We did not find any concrete evidence under which an investigation or legal action can be launched against Mashal, Abdullah or Zubair".

According to Abdullah, the AWK University's administration summoned him to the Mass Communications chairman's office, where they pressured him into accusing Mashal of blasphemy. When Abdullah refused as "Neither Mashal nor I had committed any blasphemy", the administration issued the online notification, then went to punish Abdullah by beating and Mashal by lynching.

According to the testimony of one of the prime accused, Wajahat Ullah, collected by the police, 15 to 20 persons were at the office of the chairman discussing the three students' controversial views when he was called over by fellow student Mudassar Bashir, the representative of the class. Lecturers Ziaullah Hamdard and Pir Asfandyar, clerks Anees, Saeed and Idrees, and superintendent Arshad were present and summoned him on the issue. Class representative Mudassar Bashir asked him to become a witness of the alleged blasphemy, while clerk Idrees repeated his opposition to having a communist in AWK University. The proposition of creating a committee of inquiry was opposed by clerk Idrees and class leader Bashir, while security in-charge Bilal Bakhsh declared his will to handle the issue quickly, occasionally stating his will to kill the student. The group processed toward Mashal's hostel, calling for bystanders to join and turning the expedition into an angry punitive mob.

=== Arrests ===
On 21 April, AWKUM's superintendent and office's assistant were imprisoned on judicial remand. Some of the accused were sent to the Anti-Terrorism Court (ATC). Bilal Baksh, a computer operator at the university, was alleged to have shouted slogans and called for a mob to build around Mr. Khan and murder him. Two other suspect were delivered to ATC. On 25 April two other suspects were handed over to ATC.

It was reported that the administration of the university, through a notification dated 13 April 2017, rusticated Khan and decided to investigate Khan for alleged "blasphemous activity". A provost of the university said the notification was issued after the death of Khan.

Arrested	Status	Accusation
Imran Ali (student)	ATC	Shot Mashal thrice, charged for murder.
Afsar Khan (AWKUM superintendent)		n.a.
Bilal Baksh (AWKUM computer operator)		Inciting a mob in order to lynch/murder the victim
Bilal Bux (in-charge of security in AWKUM)	ATC	n.a. (identified on video)
Amir (student)	ATC	n.a. (identified on video)
Ashfaq Khelji	ATC	Hitting Mashal Khan in the head with a flowerpot (identified on video)
Fazal Raziq	ATC	Desecrated Mashal's corpse (identified on video)
Tariq Khan (student of AWKU's mass communication)		
Ishaq Khan (student from nearby university)		
Abbas (student)	ATC	n.a.
Suleman (student)	ATC	n.a.
Usman (student)	ATC	n.a.
Shabir Ahmed (AWKUM staff)	ATC	n.a.
Nawab Ali (AWKUM staff)	ATC	n.a.

=== JIT Report ===
The 13-member Joint Investigation Team (JIT) constituted by the Supreme Court of Pakistan in response to the lynching gave its final report on 3 June 2017. The report cleared Mashal of all blasphemy charges and termed his lynching a premeditated murder conducted by certain elements in the student body and the university administration. The report also cleared Mashal's two friends, Abdullah and Zubair, of any blasphemy while raising questions about the efficacy of Mardan Police's response to the incident.

According to the report, the two prime inciters of the lynching were Sabir Mayer, president of the Pashtun Students Federation, and Ajmal Khan, president of the university's employee union. Ajmal confessed that a month before the lynching, Sabir, along with a university employee, Asad Katlang, came to his office and told him that they had to "get rid of Mashal" as he was a "threat to the party" (the 'party' is presumed to be the leftist political party, Awami National Party, whose student federation Sabir headed). The trio then proceeded to hatch a plan for Mashal's murder.

As stated in the report, the prime reason for Mashal's lynching was his constant criticism of the university's administration. A month before his lynching, he gave a television interview to AVT Khyber, a regional news channel, in which he alleged that illegal and criminal activities persisted in the university hostel and female students were also exploited in the university.

It was further found that the university had serious management issues where top posts were filled by people of criminal background due to their political affiliation. It has been suggested in the report that strict departmental action should be taken against registrar Sher Alam, director administration Peer Asfandyar, chief security officer Inayatullah Afridi, provost Fayaz Ali Shah, chief proctor professor Idrees, director sports professor Farooq and assistant registrar Humyaun for their incompetence.

In its conclusion, the report, which falls under the purview of the Supreme Court and the anti-terrorism court (ATC), has suggested severe punishments for the university employees and students involved in the crime.

=== Anti-Terrorism Court proceedings ===
On 7 February 2018, Anti-Terrorism court awarded death penalty to prime suspect Imran Ali. Imran Ali had confessed that he had shot Mashal Khan. Five other convicts named Bilal Bakhsh, Fazal-i-Raziq, Mujeebullah, Ishfaq Khan and Mudassir Bashir were awarded life-time imprisonment. 25 other convicts were awarded four-year jail sentences. Four other suspects were on the run who later surrendered to police in June 2018. Their trial took place on 21 March 2019. Two of the suspects named Arif Khan and Asad Khan were awarded life imprisonment in the Mashal Khan lynching case. While two others named Sabir Mayar and Izharullah were acquitted over lack of evidence. Father of Mashal Khan expressed satisfaction with the Anti-Terrorism verdict. However, he claimed that he will challenge the acquittal of two suspects.

== Reaction ==
=== Government ===
- Prime Minister Nawaz Sharif issued a condemnation of the lynching of Khan, saying that "I am shocked and saddened by the senseless display of mob justice that resulted in the murder of a young student, Mashal Khan, at Wali Khan University, Mardan. The nation should stand united to condemn this crime and to promote tolerance and rule of law in the society." He directed the police to arrest those who were responsible and ordered action against them.
- Members of the National Assembly of Pakistan passed a unanimous resolution to condemn the murder of Khan.
- Members of the Senate of Pakistan condemned the murder and suggested amending the blasphemy law to punish those who make false blasphemy accusations against others.
- Members of the Provincial Assembly of Balochistan condemned the murder of Khan.
- Khyber Pakhtunkhwa Chief Minister Pervez Khattak said no evidence had been found to suggest Khan had committed blasphemy.
- A senior police officer, who wanted to remain anonymous, said that "many members of the police, prosecution service and judiciary sympathised with the attackers and he did not expect any guilty verdicts" and added that "there are hundreds of sympathisers in my force and if I take too much interest in the case I might be killed too".

=== Individuals ===
Solidarity message from Pervez Hoodbhoy, Pakistani nuclear physicist, mathematician and activist to the International Conference in London, 22–24 July. Hoodbhoy speaks of Mashal Khan, lynched by a mob at his university, on accusations of blasphemy.

- Imran Khan also issued condemnation and said that "The law of the jungle can't prevail." and "even if Mashal Khan was accused of committing blasphemy, he should have been given a right of defence." A day later, he said "I want to assure parents of Khan that I will ensure justice for his death. Even if the culprits are found to be from the PTI, they will be punished. We will not discriminate along party lines in pursuing this case."
- Malala Yousafzai condemned the killing of Khan saying that "We have forgotten our values. We are not representing the true Islam. "No one is maligning the name of your country or religion…we ourselves are bringing a bad name to our country and religion. If we will continue killing each other like this, then no one will be ever safe."
- Sheikh Saleh Al-Talib who was present in Pakistan at the time of incident, said "when it comes to accusing someone of blasphemy, there are two types of people, those who are illiterate and those who misuse Islam for personal gains.
- Awami National Party (ANP) President Asfandyar Wali Khan said, "No culprit, no matter who he is, should be spared from punishment. Even hang my son if he is involved in Mashal's lynching.
- Neighbours. The residents of Mashal Khan's native town, Zaida, gathered at the grave of Mashal Khan and apologised to the deceased and his family for failing to 'stand with them in crisis'. The villagers acknowledged that they made a mistake by initially not standing with the family. The people later laid a wreath at the student's grave and offered fateha for him. They also staged a demonstration to demand justice for the student's family through punishment of killers and accomplices.

=== Public ===
Following the murder of Khan, protests were held in different parts of Pakistan over the murder of Khan. A large number of people took to streets in Khan's village in Swabi. DAWN reported that "It was probably for the first time that a large number of women participated in a mourning procession in the area." Progressive students and youth organized protests and public meetings against this brutal killing in many cities across the country. All these protests inside the country and solidarity campaign across the world demanded to put pressure on Pakistani State to take action against the murderers. Due to these protests many religious scholars had to announce Khan as a Martyr which shows the intensity of public outrage at this murder. On the 40th day after the death of Mashal Khan a public meeting was held in his village in which students and political activists participated in large numbers and asked for exemplary punishment of Mashal's killers. At this meeting which was attended by students of Quaid-e-Azam University Islamabad, Peshawar University and Malakand University among others was addressed by leaders of various political parties. At the end Khan's father Iqbal Khan addressed the meeting and said that, "Let's make the universities and other educational institutions so peaceful that in future no student falls prey to mob assault like my son."
