= Blasphemy law in Yemen =

A person who is accused of blasphemy in Yemen is often subject to vigilantism by governmental authorities. An accused person is subject to Sharia, which, according to some interpretations, prescribes death for blasphemy.

== Yemen's legal system ==
Yemen's constitution declares that Islam is the state religion. Non-Muslims are barred from holding elected office. Yemen’s legal system is a mixture of Islamic legal principles, old Egyptian laws, and Napoleonic codes. Islamic legal principles are applied in all courts—not just in Sharia courts.

== Sharia ==
Under Sharia, blasphemy is an instance of apostasy. Sharia says apostasy is a Hadd offence (an offence against God). In some jurisdictions, Sharia is understood to prescribe the death penalty for Hadd offences.

== Human rights ==
Information about blasphemy in Yemen is difficult to obtain because government authorities severely restrict the freedom of the press. Human rights abuses are common. The Press and Publications Law No. 25 for 1990 prohibits publication of material that may: prejudice Islam; jeopardize national interests; cause tribal, sectarian, racial, or regional discrimination and spread a spirit of dissent and division among the people; disseminate ideas contrary to the principles of the Yemeni Revolution; harm national unity; and distort the image of the Yemeni, Arab, or Islamic heritage.

== Democracy as blasphemy ==
The Salafi movement in Yemen is a redoubtable force against blasphemy. The movement has more than 120 centers and more than 700 mosques. The movement condemns as blasphemous all actions that promote democracy, and calls those who participate in such actions atheists and sinners.

== Global law against blasphemy ==
In 2005, on behalf of the Organisation of the Islamic Conference, Yemen introduced to the United Nations General Assembly the first resolution that called upon the world to take action against the "defamation of religion".

== Selected cases ==
In 2008, Yemeni authorities arrested Firass Al-Yafi'ee, a journalist who had been an irritant to the government since the late 1990s, on charges of drinking alcohol and committing blasphemy. During Al-Yafi'ee's trial, a fatwa appeared. The fatwa accused Al-Yafi'ee of insulting the Quran, and called for his death. Judge Anwar Al-Sayed convicted Al-Yafi'ee on one charge: drinking alcohol, and sentenced him to receive eighty lashes.

In 2000, Abdul Karim Al-Razihi fled to the Netherlands because of the campaign waged against him by Salafyoon mosques, Aden. The mosques accused al-Razihi of atheism and infidelity because of his poem titled "A Summer Night Dream." The mosques claimed that al-Razihi blamed angels and acquitted Satan where the poem states, "A Satan sees me and an angel seduced me."

In 2000, zealots orchestrated a campaign against Samir al-Yusuf for reprinting one of the classics of modern Yemeni literature, Sana: An Open City by Muhammad ‘Abd al-Wali (1940–73). The zealots accused al-Yusuf of disseminating blasphemy.
