= Blind Faith (disambiguation) =

Blind Faith was a British rock supergroup founded by Steve Winwood and Eric Clapton.

Blind Faith may also refer to:

== Film and television ==
- Blind Faith (miniseries), a 1990 TV miniseries
- Blind Faith (1998 film), a film starring Courtney B. Vance and Charles S. Dutton
- "Blind Faith" (Quantum Leap), a 1989 television episode

== Literature ==
- Blind Faith (McGinniss book), a 1989 true crime book by Joe McGinniss
- Blind Faith (novel), a 2007 novel by Ben Elton
- Blind Faith (comics), a superhero in Marvel Comics

== Music ==
- Blind Faith (Blind Faith album) (1969)
- "Blind Faith" (Chase & Status song) (2011)
- Blind Faith (Gemma Hayes album) (2024)
- Blind Faith (Legend Seven album) (1993)
- Blind Faith (Walk on Fire album) (1989)
- "Blind Faith" (Warrant song) (1991)
- "Blind Faith", a 1986 song by Hirax from Hate, Fear and Power
- "Blind Faith", a 1990 song by the Levellers from A Weapon Called the Word
- "Blind Faith", a 1993 song by Poison from Native Tongue
- "Blind Faith", a 2002 song by Dream Theater from Six Degrees of Inner Turbulence
- "Blind Faith", a 2006 song by Quiet Riot from Rehab
- "Blind Faith", a 2012 song by Shadows Fall from Fire from the Sky
- "Blind Faith", a 2018 song by Johnny Manuel, a member of Equinox
- "Blind Faith", a 2018 song by Myles Kennedy from Year of the Tiger

== See also ==
- Faith (disambiguation)
