= Blasphemy law in Malaysia =

Malaysia curbs blasphemy and any insult to religion or to the religious by rigorous control of what people in that country can say or do. Government-funded schools teach young Muslims the principles of Sunni Islam, and instruct young non-Muslims on morals. The government informs the citizenry on proper behavior and attitudes, and ensures that Muslim civil servants take courses in Sunni Islam. The government ensures that the broadcasting and publishing media do not create disharmony or disobedience. If someone blasphemes or otherwise engages in deviant behavior, Malaysia punishes such transgression with Sharia (for Muslims only) or through legislation such as the Penal Code (for both Muslims and non-Muslims).

== Legislation ==
=== Penal Code ===
Sections 298 and 298A of the Penal Code of Malaysia criminalise expressions that insult on any religion. According to section 298, the act of uttering words or sounds, or making any gesture, or placing any object with the deliberate intent "to wound the religious feeling" of any person is punishable with up to one year imprisonment, or with fine, or with both. Meanwhile, section 298A criminalises expressions that caused disharmony, disunity, hatred or ill-will, or prejudices the maintenance of harmony or unity on grounds of religion, punishable with two to five years of imprisonment.

Prosecutions for blasphemy under the Penal Code apply to insults on any religion, but the provisions have been mainly used to target those deemed to offend Islam.

=== Communications and Multimedia Act 1998 ===
Section 233 of the Communications and Multimedia Act 1998 also restrict any online expressions that are "obscene, indecent, false, menacing or offensive in character with intent to annoy, abuse, threaten or harass another person", with penalty of up to one year imprisonment or RM50,000 fine, or both. This section has been utilised to arrest and prosecute those who insult on Islam, Hinduism or other religions.

=== Printing Presses and Publications Act 1984 ===
The Printing Presses and Publications Act 1984 is law that regulates physical publications in Malaysia. It gave the Minister of Home Affairs the absolute discretion to restrict or ban any publications that is prejudicial or is likely to prejudicial to "public order, morality, security, public interest or national interest", or is likely to "alarm public opinion" or "be contrary to any law".

== The media ==
The government strictly controls what is broadcast and published. The Printing Presses and Publications Act 1984 prohibits the publication of articles or pictures that could disturb public security, harmony, or morality. The printing, sale, distribution, or possession of any banned book is punishable by up to three years imprisonment and/or a fine of 20,000 ringgits. In 2008, the government banned sixty-two books that touched upon religion. In 2008, customs authorities seized six titles of Christian children's books because the books contain words that—according to Islamic authorities—belong to Islam. The Publications and Al-Quran Texts Control Department contended that "Allah" (God), "Baitullah" (House of God), and "Solat" (prayer) are lawfully used by Muslims only.

== Selected cases ==
In 2000, the Sharia High Court in the state of Kelantan sentenced four persons to three years in prison for disregarding a lower court's order to recant their deviant beliefs and "return to the true teachings of Islam." The civil High Court rejected the argument that Sharia has no jurisdiction over people who have ceased to be Muslims. In dismissing the appeal, the Court of Appeal in August 2002 ruled that only the Sharia court has jurisdiction to determine whether a person has ceased to be a Muslim.

On or about 23 May 2002, a French missionary was arrested on blasphemy charges after distributing a pamphlet about Quranic plagiary. Though he could have been sentenced to two to five years in jail for "acting in a manner which could lead to disharmony between Christians and Muslims," a judge ordered that he be deported.

On 23 January 2006, the National Fatwa Council, Malaysia's highest Islamic advisory authority, banned Muslims from taking part in the activities associated with Black Metal music. Datuk Mustafa Abdul Rahman, the director-general of the Islamic Development Department (JAKIM), told a press conference on 27 January 2006, that Black Metal often led its followers to worship Satan, rebel, kill, and incite hatred. Nevertheless, the government favored counseling rather than a ban upon the musical genre.

In August 2007, the government of Malaysia suspended for one month the operations of a daily Makkal Osai (in the Tamil language) for violating the Printing Presses and Publications Act 1984. On 21 August 2007, the daily had published a caricature of Jesus Christ clutching a cigarette and a can of beer.

In January 2008, officials from the Ministry of Internal Security seized Christian children's books from several bookshops. The books contained drawings representing Moses and Noah. The officials deemed the drawings "caricatures of prophets," and said the drawings were offensive to Muslim sensibilities. The Malaysian Council of Churches accused ministry officials of overstepping their authority by confiscating literature that was not meant for Muslims. The Ministry returned the books.

On February 12, 2008, the Internal Security Ministry issued a directive to the Catholic Church to stop using the word "Allah" in its weekly publication, The Herald. On 16 February 2009, the Ministry revised its directive to permit the word "Allah" in Christian publications if each publication bore a notice which indicated the publication was not for Muslims.

In 2008, religious authorities were seeking Ayah Pin, the leader of a banned, nonviolent religious group known as the Sky Kingdom, and one of his four wives for supporting "deviant" religious practices. On 3 March 2008, a Sharia Court sentenced Kamariah Ali, 57, who converted from Islam to the banned group, to two years imprisonment for apostasy.

In November 2008, the Malaysian National Fatwa Council told Muslims to refrain from doing yoga because is it blasphemous. The condemnation of yoga followed upon the council's condemnation of females who wear trousers. The Council said that girls who wear trousers are at risk of becoming sexually-active tomboys.

In March 2009, Malaysian religious authorities threatened to sue the Malaysian Bar, which represents 12,000 of the country's lawyers, for using the word “Allah” on the Bar's website.

== See also ==
- Apostasy in Islam
- Caning in Malaysia
- Freedom of religion in Malaysia
- Freedom of speech by country
- Islam in Malaysia
- Religion in Malaysia
