= Muhammad Yahya Waloni =

Indonesian Islamic Scholar (1970–2025)

Personal life
- Born: 30 November 1970 Manado, North Sulawesi, Indonesia
- Died: 6 June 2025 (aged 54) Makassar, South Sulawesi, Indonesia
- Occupation: Islamic preacher

Religious life
- Religion: Sunni Islam

Yahya Yopie Waloni (30 November 1970 – 6 June 2025), also known as Muhammad Yahya Waloni, was an Indonesian Islamic preacher of Minahasa descent who studied comparative religion.

== Biography ==
Yahya was born as a Christian in Manado, North Sulawesi on 30 November 1970, he was the youngest of seven children. His father was a retired soldier who had sat as a member of the House of Representatives for the district in North Sulawesi. He admitted that when he was young he was rebellious and had tattoo marks on his body. He had a doctoral diploma from the Institute of Theologia Oikumene Imanuel.

Yahya claimed to be a former pastor and once a lecturer at the Rector of STT Eben-Haezer. He and his wife declared the Islamic creed on 11 October 2006 at 12.00 WITA with the guidance of Komarudin Sofa, Secretary of the Nahdlatul Ulama Tolitoli Branch Executive, Central Sulawesi.

In January 2022, South Jakarta Court sentenced Yahya to 5 months in prison for calling Saint Stephen "tetanus" (bacterial infection causing muscle spasms), and Roh Kudus (Holy Spirit) as Roh Kudis (translated to English as "spirit of scabies").

Yahya died on 6 June 2025, at the age of 54.
