= Abd al-Karim al-Razihi =

Yemeni poet (born 1947)

Abd al-Karim al-Razihi (ar: عبد الكريم الرازحي) (born 1947) is a Yemeni poet. His first book of poems was titled The Need for a Second Heaven and an Additional Hell. He worked at the Yemeni Ministry of Culture in Sanaa, and edited the magazine Al-Yaman al-Jadid.

In 2000, al-Razihi's poem "A Summer Night Dream" landed him in trouble with religious fundamentalists. An orchestrated campaign culminated in his fleeing the country to seek safety in the Netherlands. He returned some time later. Razihi's comments on the popular drug khat, which first appeared in an article in the newspaper Yemen Times in 1993, have also been quoted widely: "Qat...is the opium of our people. It is the green Imam who rules over our republic. It is the key for everything and it is central to all our social occasions. It is the unexplainable that explains everything".

Al-Razihi's poetry appeared in translation in a 1988 anthology of modern Arabian literature. His short stories have been translated by the Australian writer Eva Sallis and appeared in the literary journal Heat in 2005.
