= Nasi' =

Aspect of the pre-Islamic Arabian calendar

Nasīʾ (Arabic: ٱلنَّسِيء, an-Nasīʾ, "postponement"), also Romanized as Nasii or Nasie, was an aspect of the pre-Islamic Arabian calendar, mentioned in the Quran in the context of the "four forbidden months". In pre-Islamic Arabia, the decision of "postponement" had been administered by the Banu Kinanah, by a man known as the Qalammas (pl. qalāmisa). Different interpretations of its meaning have been proposed.

== Postponement unrelated to a fixed-season calendar ==
Some scholars maintain that the pre-Islamic calendar used in Central Arabia was a purely lunar calendar similar to the modern Islamic calendar. According to this view, nasīʾ is related to the pagan practices of the Meccan Arabs, where they would alter the distribution of the forbidden months within a given year without implying a calendar manipulation. This interpretation is supported by Arab historians and lexicographers, like Ibn Hisham, Ibn Manzur, and the corpus of tafsir. Thus the Encyclopaedia of Islam concludes, "The Arabic system of [Nasīʾ] can only have been intended to move the Hajj and the fairs associated with it in the vicinity of Mecca to a suitable season of the year. It was not intended to establish a fixed calendar to be generally observed."

This interpretation is also corroborated by an early Sabaean language inscription, where a religious ritual was "postponed" (ns'ʾw) due to war. According to the context of this inscription, the verb ns'ʾ has nothing to do with intercalation, but only with moving religious events within the calendar itself. The similarity between the religious concept of this ancient inscription and the Qur'an suggests that non-calendaring postponement is also the Qur'anic meaning of Nasīʾ.

== As lunisolar intercalation ==
Others concur that the pre-Islamic calendar was originally a lunar calendar, but suggest that about 200 years before the Hijra it was transformed into a lunisolar calendar containing an intercalary month added from time to time to keep the pilgrimage within the season of the year when merchandise was most abundant. This interpretation was first proposed by the Muslim astrologer and astronomer Abu Ma'shar al-Balkhi (787–886), and later by al-Mas'udi (c. 896–956), al-Biruni (973 – after 1050) and some Western scholars. This view was also held by the Quran scholar and translator Abdullah Yusuf Ali (1872–1953).

This interpretation considers Nasīʾ to be a synonym to the Arabic word for "intercalation" (kabīsa). It also suggests that every second or third year the beginning of the year was postponed by one month. The intercalation doubled the month of the pilgrimage, that is, the month of the pilgrimage and the following month were given the same name, postponing the names and the sanctity of all subsequent months in the year by one. The first intercalation doubled the first month Muharram, then three years later the second month Safar was doubled, continuing until the intercalation had passed through all twelve months of the year and returned to Muharram, when it was repeated. The Arabs, according to one explanation mentioned by Abu Ma'shar, learned of this type of intercalation from the Hebrew calendar used by the Jews, since intercalation was announced by the Nasi, meaning "prince", or "ruler". The Hebrew calendar as commanded in Exodus 12, is necessarily lunisolar, because the lunar new year is fixed to the month of Aviv, or spring, and cannot rotate through the year.

== Prohibition under Islam ==
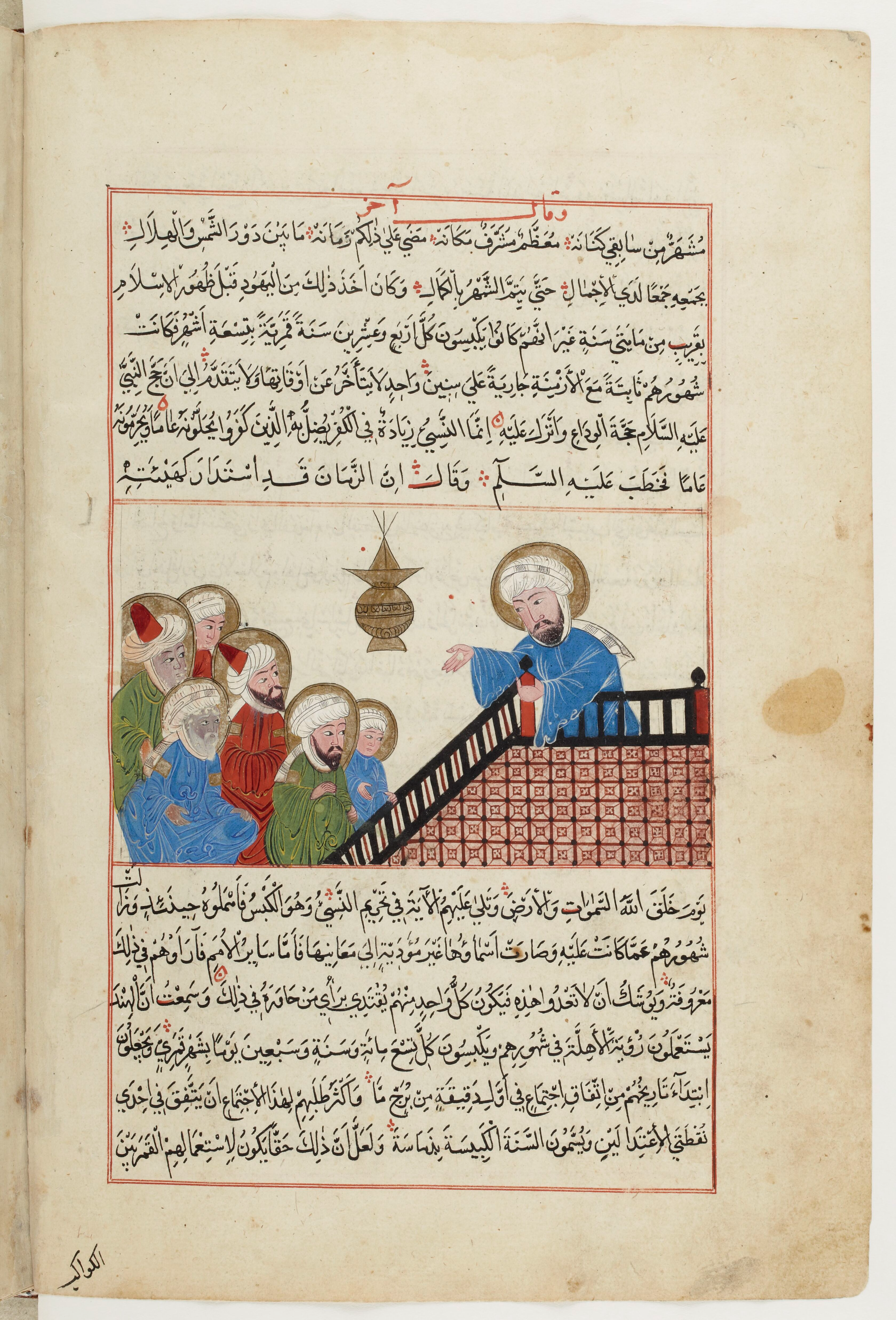
"Muhammad forbids the intercalation of an additional month in the lunar year," from an illustrated copy of al-Biruni's The Remaining Signs of Past Centuries (17th-century copy of an early 14th-century Ilkhanid manuscript).

In the tenth year of the Hijra, according to chapter 9:36–37, a prohibition of Nasīʾ was enacted:

The number of months with Allah has been twelve months by Allah's ordinance since the day He created the heavens and the earth. Of these four are known as forbidden [to fight in]; That is the straight usage, so do not wrong yourselves therein, and fight against the disbelievers collectively as they fight against you collectively. But know that Allah is with those who restrain themselves.

Verily the transposing (of a prohibited month) is an addition to Unbelief: The Unbelievers are led to wrong thereby: for they make it lawful one year, and forbidden another year, of months forbidden by Allah and make such forbidden ones lawful. The evil of their course seems pleasing to them. But Allah guideth not those who reject Faith.

— at-Tawba 9, verses 36-37

The prohibition of Nasīʾ would presumably have been announced when the intercalated month had returned to its position just before the month of Nasīʾ began. If Nasīʾ meant intercalation, then the number and the position of the intercalary months between 1 AH and 10 AH are uncertain; Western calendar dates commonly cited for key events in early Islam such as the Hijra, the Battle of Badr, the Battle of Uhud and the Battle of the Trench, should be viewed with caution as they might be in error by one, two or even three lunar months.

This prohibition was mentioned by Muhammad during the Farewell Sermon which was delivered on 9 Dhu al-Hijjah 10 AH (Julian date Friday March 6, 632) on Mount Arafat during the Farewell Pilgrimage to Mecca.

Certainly the Nasi' is an impious addition, which has led the infidels into error. One year they authorise the Nasi', another year they forbid it. They observe the divine precept with respect to the number of the sacred months, but in fact they profane that which God has declared to be inviolable, and sanctify that which God has declared to be profane. Assuredly time, in its revolution, has returned to such as it was at the creation of the heavens and the earth. In the eyes of God the number of the months is twelve. Among these twelve months four are sacred, namely, Rajab, which stands alone, and three others which are consecutive.

The three successive forbidden months mentioned by Muhammad (months in which battles are forbidden) are Dhu al-Qi'dah, Dhu al-Hijjah, and Muharram, months 11, 12, and 1. The single forbidden month is Rajab, month 7. These months were considered forbidden both within the new Islamic calendar and within the pre-Islamic Meccan calendar.

== See also ==
- Islamic calendar
- Lunisolar calendar
