= Nerikes Allehanda =

Daily newspaper in Sweden

- Type: Daily newspaper
- Format: Compact
- Owner: LT Liberala Tidningar AB
- Publisher: NA-koncernen
- Editor-in-chief: Karin Säfström
- Staff writers: 196
- Founded: 1843
- Political alignment: Independently liberal
- Language: Swedish
- Headquarters: Örebro, Sweden
- Circulation: 46,600 (2014)
- ISSN: 1103-971X
- Website: www.na.se

Nerikes Allehanda (shortened NA) is a daily newspaper based in Örebro, Sweden, and distributed across Örebro County. It was founded in 1843 as a weekly paper and became a daily in 1894. The paper is owned by the media group LT Liberala Tidningar AB and the stated position of the editorial is "independently liberal".

The name Nerikes Allehanda literally means "Närke's Sundry" (allehanda is an older Swedish word meaning "sundry/miscellaneous", and Nerike is an older Swedish spelling of Närke).

== History ==
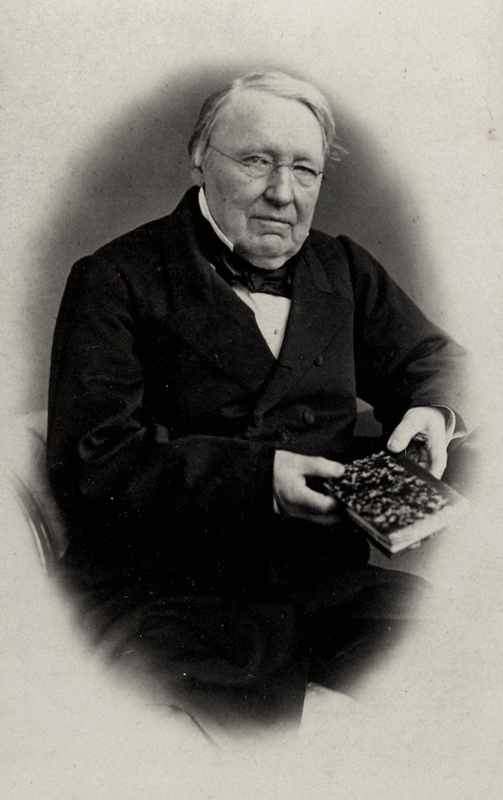
Otto Joel Gumaelius

Nerikes Allehanda was founded in 1843 by Otto-Joel Gumaelius and Svante Falk. Falk was the owner of the printing house and Gumaelius, a devoted liberal, became its first editor. The first edition was published on 4 March 1843 and consisted of four pages. The newspaper was only published one day per week in 120 copies.

Nerikes Allehanda was transferred into a corporation (Swedish: aktiebolag) in 1888. In 1894, the newspaper started to get published six days per week. It still consisted of four pages but now had a circulation of about 6,000 copies.

In 1933, the lawyer Claes Ljung bought a majority of the newspaper's shares.

In 1944, Nerikes Allehanda merged with Nerikes Tidning and became the largest newspaper in the county with a circulation of about 31,000 copies.

In 1951 it started to get distributed as a morning paper (earlier it had been an evening paper).

In 1957, Nerikes Allehanda bought the newspaper Motala Tidning and in 1964 the newspaper Nora Tidning was bought as well.

In 1975, the newspaper was sold from the Ljung family to the newly formed limited partnership corporation Liberala Tidningar.

In 1993, the radio station Radio Rix, which is now owned to 90% by Nerikes Allehanda, was started.

In 1995, the newspaper was published on the web for the first time.

In 2001, the newspaper was first distributed seven days per week.

In 2005, the format was changed from the classic broadsheet to tabloid.

== Circulation ==
In 1998, the circulation of Nerikes Allehanda was 68,000 copies. Its circulation was 65,300 copies in 2007. The paper had a circulation of 52,700 copies in 2012 and 49,800 copies in 2013.

== Mohammed drawings controversy ==
On 19 August 2007, the newspaper printed a drawing by Swedish artist Lars Vilks depicting the Prophet Mohammed as a roundabout dog. According to editor-in-chief Ulf Johansson, the publishing of the image was done by the newspaper in order to protest the refusal of several Swedish art galleries to show a series of Mohammed paintings by Vilks.

In the ensuing days, demonstrations by Muslims and their supporters, and counter-demonstrations by youths claiming to be demonstrating in favor of freedom of the press occurred in Örebro. "They say they are offended and I regret that, because our purpose was not to offend anyone," Johansson told The Associated Press. "But they are asking for an apology and a promise that I never again publish a similar image ... and that I cannot do."

Prime Minister Fredrik Reinfeldt expressed support for freedom of the press, as well as for religious tolerance.
