= Blasphemy law in Jordan =

Islam is the state religion of the Hashemite Kingdom of Jordan and most Jordanians are Sunni Muslims. The kingdom prevents blasphemy against any religion by education, by laws, and by policies that discourage non-conformity.

== Jordan's laws ==
The Jordanian Penal Code prohibits anyone from blaspheming religion, demeaning religious feelings, or insulting prophets. Violating the prohibitions makes the violator liable for imprisonment up to three years. By a 2006 amendment to Jordan's Criminal Procedures Act, Jordan can prosecute a crime committed out of Jordan if the crime affects the Jordanian people by "electronic means."

The Kingdom restricts freedom of speech, press, assembly, and association. The Press and Publications Law and the Press Association Law place restrictions on the press and upon the publication of books in Jordan. Academics report that they are subject to surveillance.

== Selected cases ==
In October 2008, the prosecutor general of a magistrate's court in Amman charged Islam Samhan with insulting Islam and the Quran as well as violating the Press and Publications Law for incorporating verses of the Quran into a book of love poetry. On or about 25 June 2009, the magistrate's court ruled that twenty-seven-year-old Samhan should spend one year in prison and pay a fine of 10,000 dinars.

On 1 July 2008, a Jordanian prosecutor charged eleven Danes and one Dutchman, with blasphemy and contempt of Muslims. One of the charged Danes was the cartoonist who, in 2005, drew a caricature of Mohammed and other cartoons for the Danish newspaper Jyllands-Posten. The other Danes were the editors of newspapers that published the cartoons. The charged Dutchman was politician Geert Wilders, who made an anti-Quran film (Fitna). Wilders and the others did not comply with the prosecutor's order that they stand trial in Jordan.

In May 2006, two journalists involved in reprinting three of the 12 Jyllands-Posten Muhammad cartoons were issued a two-month prison sentence. Jordan was the only Muslim country to reprint the Danish cartoons depicting Muhammed in one of its newspapers. The two Jordanian editors responsible were sacked and pressured to issue a public apology.

In January 2003, authorities in Jordan arrested three Jordanian journalists: Nasser Qamash, Roman Haddad and Muhannad Mbaidin for blaspheming Mohammed in Al Hilal, a weekly newspaper. Their article speculated on Mohammed's sexual potency after marrying Aisha, the favorite of his fourteen wives. A military tribunal sentenced the journalists to prison terms ranging from two to six months, and closed Al Hilal for two months.

== See also ==
- Apostasy in Islam
- Human rights in Jordan
- Religion in Jordan
