= Eden Community =

Islamic syncretic religion

Eden Community (also called as Salamullah or God's Kingdom of Eden or Kaum Eden) is or was a religion founded by Lia Aminuddin (born Sjamsuriati Gustaman and later known as Lia Eden (21 August 1947 – 9 April 2021)). It has been called a syncretic faith, combining Islam (the faith she was brought up in) with selected wisdom cobbled from various world religions".

Lia said she received a revelation in 1995 from the angel Gabriel to preach a new belief system continuing the teachings of the three Abrahamic Religions: Judaism, Christianity, and Islam, and uniting with other major religions including Buddhism, Jainism and Hinduism. As of 2005, the group was headquartered on Jalan Mahoni 30 in Senen, Central Jakarta, Indonesia.

The Eden Community was established to help Lia spread her teachings. She controversially claimed to be the incarnation of the Virgin Mary and was assigned by Gabriel to announce the coming of Jesus Christ to earth. She also made several sensational prophecies, arousing anger from established religious groups, especially from the Indonesian Ulema Council (MUI). The MUI issued a fatwa against Lia Eden for spreading heresy and banned the Salamullah association in December 1997. The group replied with a statement it claimed was from the angel Jibril called "Gabriel's edict" condemning the MUI for “judging truth in an unfair and arbitrary manner”. As a result, Lia was arrested on charges of religious blasphemy.

== History ==
The original story of Eden was told by Lia, when one day in 1974, she, an ordinary housewife known for her creative dried flower arrangements, was relaxing at her in-laws’ residence when she saw a ball of bright yellow light hovering above her head before vanishing. Some 20 years later, on the night of 27 October 1995, the ball of light returned, enveloping her while she was deep in daily prayer. Her spiritual guide Habib al-Huda, revealed himself to be the archangel Gabriel, calling her to the divine.

In its early days, the cult had as many as 100 followers—including "celebrities, cultural experts, intellectuals and students". The socio-economic turbulence of the times, a monetary crisis and a government on the verge of collapse, gave the group an opening. "As the certainties of the old political, economic and social orders began to crumble, a desire for dramatic change and novelty took over."

In 2000 Lia proclaimed Eden a new religion—Salamullah. Lia's sermons drew hundreds, including some of the Indonesia's "leading intellectuals, revolutionaries and artists".

But as her teachings "veered even farther into fringe religion", the religious and political (Islamic) mainstream became "unrelenting" in their attacks. "Her followers were ostracized, her teachings reviled, her public appearances ridiculed. She was jailed twice for blasphemy."

In 1997, the MUI had issued an edict declaring Eden's religion deviant. (Note: "As expected, in December 1997 the Indonesian Ulema Council (MUI) condemned Salamullah for spreading false Koranic teachings".) In December, 2005, the group's meeting place was surrounded by thousands of locals. Police forcibly evacuated followers to prevent them from being attacked by the people, who claimed that Lia and her followers were teaching heresies of Islam.

Lia served sixteen months in prison after being convicted of blasphemy for proselytising her religion by the Central Jakarta District Court on 29 June 2006. Lia's right-hand man, Wahyu Andito Putro Wibisono was given a two-year prison sentence for the same charge. On 2 June 2009, the Court convicted her again for the same crime and sentenced her to two and a half years in prison. Lia died on 9 April 2021 "almost unnoticed", according to the Jakarta Post.

== Doctrine ==
According to Lia, she was told by Gabriel to establish a multi-faith community named Eden/Salamullah, whose purpose was to spread messages channeled to her of “world judgement, Oneness and Peace from the Creator of Life.” The group meets in a house named “The Kingdom of God”. However, locals regard the community not as a multi-faith religion but as a cult of Islam, and have often been hostile. The group agrees with the Islamic doctrine of the Seal of the Prophets (that Muhammad was the last prophet), but also teaches that other holy figures will be reincarnated—such as Gautama Buddha, Jesus Christ, and Kwan Im (the Chinese goddess of mercy).

According to Apologetics Index, Lia has made various religious claims over time: that she has received messages from ‘Archangel Gabriel’, that "she herself" is Gabriel or the Holy Spirit"; that God has "declared her to be 'Gabriel’s mate,'" and that she is “the one God has declared as His heavenly incarnate on earth,” and also that "her son is Jesus Christ". Religion News Blog states that in 1998 Lia proclaimed herself Imam Mahdi (a descendant of Muhammad who, according to prophecy, will come to Earth during its last days to bring peace and justice to the world) — as well as Mary, mother of Jesus Christ.

In 2006 the site (which is no longer online) read,

Welcome to the Holy Throne of the Kingdom of Eden. This website — which belongs to the Holy Spirit, the Sovereign of the Holy Throne of the Kingdom of Eden — is the only website of the Archangel Gabriel that voices the Revelations from God the Lord of the kings in this era. His Majesty the Holy Spirit — an angel incarnate in Lia Eden — is represented in physicality by Lia Eden — Syamsuriati Lia Eden (Her Majesty the Sun Lia Eden), the Loyal and the Truthful."
