= Roundabout dog =

Dog-shaped sculpture placed on a roundabout

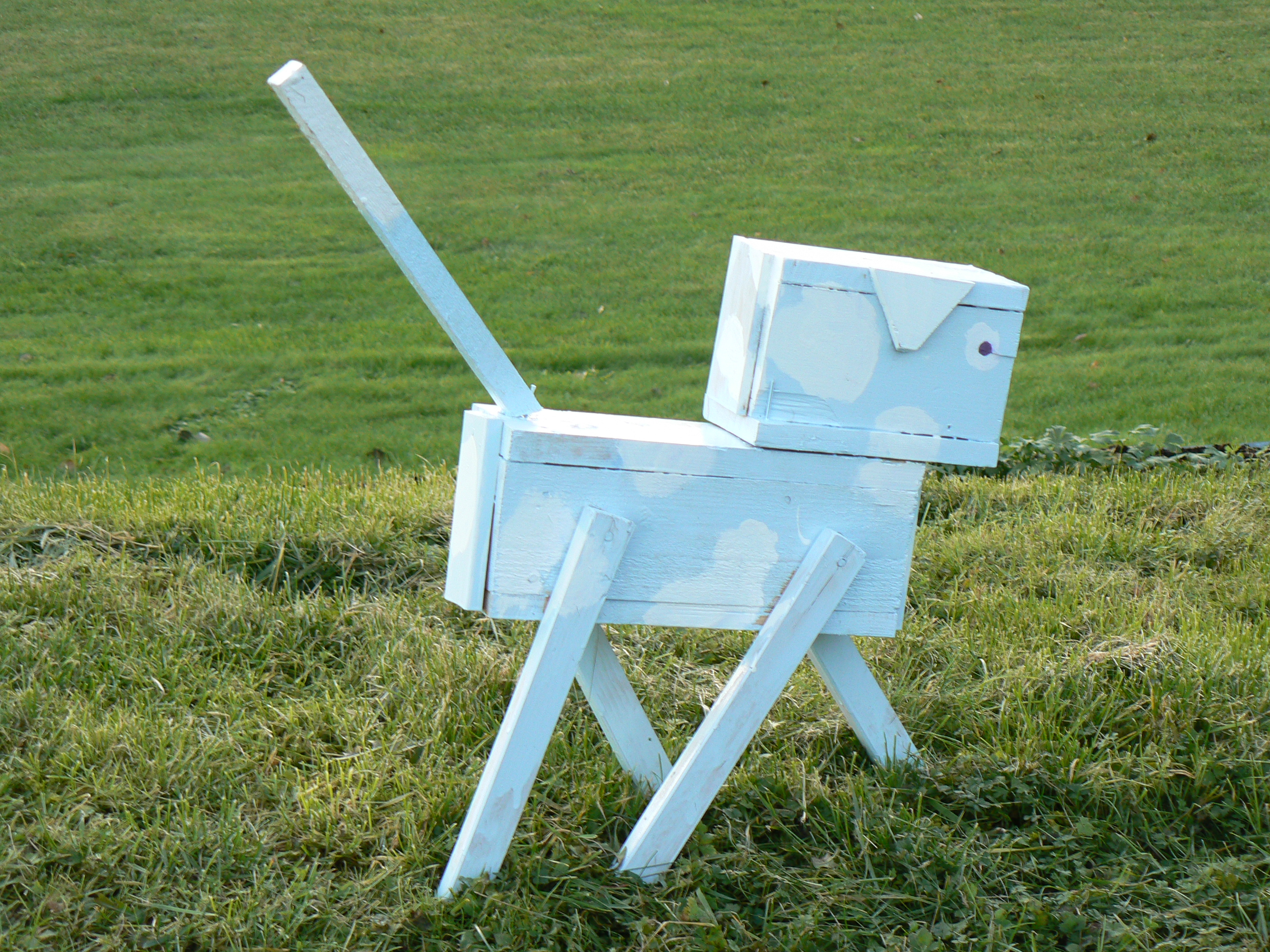
Roundabout dog on the Vallarondellen roundabout, in Linköping, Östergötland, Sweden

A roundabout dog (Swedish: rondellhund) is a form of street installation and public phenomenon that began in Sweden in the autumn of 2006, when anonymous people began placing homemade dog sculptures in the center of roundabouts.

Roundabout dogs have appeared across Sweden and other countries, including in Spain after they were mentioned on television. A Swedish tabloid paper placed a roundabout dog at Piccadilly Circus in London. The phenomenon continued for the rest of 2006, and there have been sporadic subsequent recurrences. Roundabout dogs are typically made of wood, though some are made of plastic, metal or textile.

== History ==
The roundabout dogs started appearing in Linköping, Östergötland, Sweden after a sculptured dog that was part of the official roundabout installation Cirkulation II (English: Circulation II) by sculptor Stina Opitz had been vandalised and later removed. The original dog had been made of concrete, and Opitz was planning to make a new version of it after the vandalism, when someone placed a homemade wooden dog on the roundabout. The dog was given a concrete dogbone by another anonymous artist. Soon after the media reported these developments, roundabout dogs started appearing in various places around the country.

In some smaller towns where there were no roundabouts, dog sculptures were placed in ordinary intersections with traffic islands.

In July 2007, artist Lars Vilks incited controversy by creating drawings for an art exhibition, which depicted Muhammad as a roundabout dog. The publication of these images in Swedish newspapers led to Vilks being subjected to threats of violence and put under police protection until his death in October 2021.

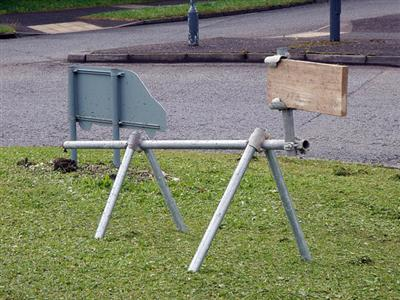
Roundabout dog on the Piccotts End roundabout in Hemel Hempstead, Hertfordshire, UK

In 2009, similar dogs appeared on some of the roundabouts in Hemel Hempstead in England.
