= List of marauding terrorist incidents =

This is a list of marauding terrorist incidents. Marauding terrorist incidents refers to terrorist incidents which occur across multiple sites and perpetrated by the same attacker or group of attackers where firearms are the principle weapon. Not included are car bomb attacks, there is a separate list for attacks using car bombs unless attackers also used firearms in the attacks. Mass suicide bombings such as the 7 July 2005 London bombings will not be counted either, unless there are firearms used in the attacks.

Date	Article/Name	Type	Locations	Dead	Injured	Details	Perpetrator
2-24 October 2002	Beltway Sniper Attacks	Shootings	Baltimore-Washington Metropolitan Area, United States: Across the Baltimore-Washington Metropolitan Area of Maryland and Virginia	17	10	John Allen Muhammed and Lee Boyd Malvo committed a series of sniper attacks in several locations across Maryland and Virginia. The attacks killed 17 and injured 10 others. Debates continue as to whether the Beltway Sniper Attacks were inspired by extremist ideology.	John Allen Muhammad and Lee Boyd Malvo
26–29 November 2008	2008 Mumbai attacks	Mass shootings, bombings, hostage taking,	Mumbai, India: Leopold Café; Chhatrapati Shivaki Terminus; The Taj Mahal Palace Hotel; Oberoi Trident; Cama Hospital; Nariman House	~166	600+	10 terrorists entered into Mumbai and proceeded to attack 12 coordinated shootings and bombings which lasted for 4 days. Attackers targeted a train station, hotels, restaurants, a police station and a hospital. Hostages were taken at some locations and 8 explosions were reported over the 4 days. The hostage crisis in the Taj Mahal Palace Hotel ended with a raid on 29 November.	Lashkar-e-Taiba
7–9 January 2015	January 2015 Île-de-France attacks	Mass shooting, hostage taking	Paris and around Île-de-France, France: Rue Nicolas-Appert, 11th arrondissement of Paris; Dammartin-en-Goële; Fontenay-aux-Roses; Montrouge; Porte de Vincennes	20	22	On 7 January, Chérif and Saïd Kouachi, attacked the Charlie Hebdo offices in Paris killing 10 before escaping. On the same day, a third attacker; Amedy Coulibaly committed shootings at Fontenay-aux-Roses and Montrouge in Paris, killing a police officer and injuring 2. On 9 January, Hostages were taken by the Kouachi brothers as they sheltered at an industrial unit in Dammartin-en-Goële. They were killed here without the death of any hostages. At the same time as the Dammartin-en-Goële hostage taking, Coulibaly held patrons at a Hypermarché hostage, killing 4 as he entered. He threatened to kill more if the Kouachi brothers were killed. The raid occurred around the same time as that in Dammartin-en-Goële. Coulibaly was killed in the raid.	Al-Qaeda in the Arabian Peninsula and Islamic State of Iraq and the Levant
14–15 February 2015	2015 Copenhagen shootings	Mass shooting	Copenhagen, Denmark: Krudttønden; Great Synagogue; near Nørrebro Station	3	5	On 14 February, Omar Abdel Hamid El-Hussein attacked a cultural event at Krudttønden attended by Swedish cartoonist Lars Vilks who had previously been threatened for drawing the prophet Mohammed. El-Hussein attempted to gain access to the venue without using the main entrance but ended up starting his attack outside as film director Finn Nørgaard attempted to stop him. El-Hussein then shot through the windows of the venue, injuring three police officers. The day after, a bat mitzvah held at the Grand Synagogue was attacked by El-Hussein. He failed to enter the Synagogue, but killed a guard outside of the synagogue and injured two other police officers. El-Hussein then returned to his address near Nørrebro Station which was being watched by police officers as he visited the location between the two attacks. He was killed here.	Omar Abdel Hamid El-Hussein
13 November 2015	November 2015 Paris attacks	Mass shootings, bombings, grenade attack, hostage taking	Paris and Saint-Denis, France: Near Stade de France; Rues Bichat and Alibert; Rue de la Fontaine-au-Roi; The Bataclan theatre; Rue de Charonne; Boulevard Voltaire	137	368	Multiple attacks took place across Paris killing 137 including 7 perpetrators. 3 teams composed of at least 9 attackers carried out 6 separate attacks. One team of three detonated outside of the Stade de France at different times, killing only one civilian. Another team of three attacked bars and restaurants across Paris, one detonating his vest in a restaurant at Boulevard Voltaire. The final team took hostages at the Bataclan theatre, massacring attendees of a concert while holding them hostage. All 3 detonated during the raid of the Bataclan.	Islamic State of Iraq and the Levant
5 – 10 June 2016	2016 Aktobe shootings	Mass shootings	Aktobe, Kazakhstan: Two gun stores; National guard base; Children's camp	25	40+	From 5 to 10 June, multiple attacks by a large group of terrorists occurred, with the largest being 16 who attacked two gun stores before ramming their way into a national guard base before being arrested. Later on 8 June, security guards at a children's camp were targeted by a shooting, while on 10 June, 5 more militants were killed and two policemen wounded in gun battles around Aktobe.	Islamic extremists
7 June 2017	2017 Tehran shootings	Mass shootings and use of PBIEDs	Tehran, Iran: Iranian parliament; Ayatollah Khomeini's mausoleum	12	40+	On 7 June, a group of four terrorists carried out sequential attacks on Iran's parliament building Ayatollah Khomeini's mausoleum in central Tehran.	Islamic State of Iraq and the Levant
15 March 2019	Christchurch mosque shootings	Mass shootings	Christchurch, New Zealand: Al Noor Mosque; Linwood Islamic Centre	51	49	On 15 March 2019, a lone attacker carried out consecutive mass shootings at two mosques in Christchurch, New Zealand. The gunman killed dozens of people at Al Noor Mosque before traveling to Linwood Islamic Center and killing more worshipers. The suspect, 28-year-old Brenton Tarrant, was arrested while fleeing from the Linwood crime scene. He had sent out a white supremacist manifesto decrying Muslim immigration minutes before the attack.	Brenton Tarrant

== See also ==
- List of non-state terrorist incidents
- List of major terrorist incidents
- List of mass car bombings
