= 2015 Copenhagen shootings =

Spree shootings that occurred in Copenhagen, Denmark, on 14 February 2015

- 2015 Copenhagen shootings (Copenhagen)
- Location: Serridslevvej 2, 2100 København Ø; Krystalgade 12, 1172 København K; Svanevej, 2400 København NV
- Date: 14–15 February 2015; 15:00–4:50 (UTC+1)
- Weapons: M/95 (C7A2) assault rifle; 9 mm pistol; 7.65 mm Walther PP
- Deaths: 3 (including the perpetrator)
- Injuries: 5 police officers
- Perpetrator: Omar Abdel Hamid El-Hussein
- Motive: Islamic extremism

On 14–15 February 2015, three shootings occurred in Copenhagen, Denmark. The first shooting took place on 14 February at a small public afternoon event called "Art, Blasphemy and Freedom of Expression" at the Krudttønden cultural centre, where a gunman killed one civilian who tried to stop him and wounded three police officers. 30 to 40 people attended the event, amongst whom were the Swedish artist Lars Vilks, who was among the key speakers, and François Zimeray, Ambassador of France in Denmark, who opened the seminar with his speech just before the attack took place. Vilks is often described as the main target because of his drawings of Muhammad.

The second shooting took place later that night (after midnight, and, therefore, on the 15th), outside the city's Great Synagogue in Krystalgade. A gunman killed a Jewish man on security duty during a bat mitzvah celebration, and wounded two police officers. Later that morning near Nørrebro station, police tracking the suspect shot and killed the man, after he opened fire on them while he attempted to enter a residential building under police surveillance. The perpetrator was identified as Omar Abdel Hamid El-Hussein.

== Attacks ==
=== Krudttønden attack ===
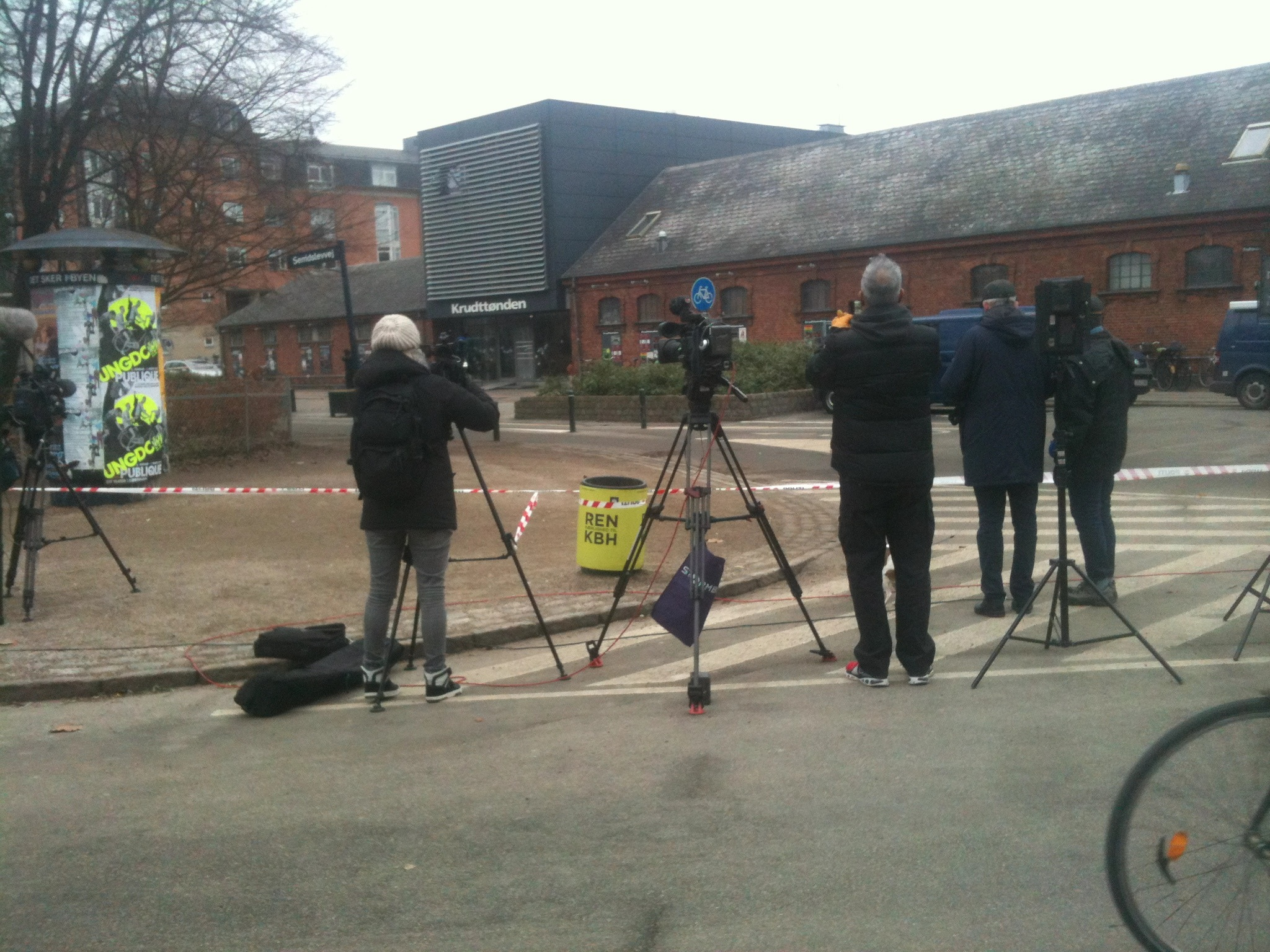
Press behind police cordon in front of Krudttønden on 15 February

Swedish cartoonist Lars Vilks had been the subject of death threats from Islamic extremists in the wake of the controversy over his drawings of Muhammad in 2007. On 14 February 2015 at 15:00 CET, an event titled "Art, Blasphemy and Freedom of Expression" (Danish: Kunst, blasfemi og ytringsfrihed) took place at Krudttønden cultural centre at Østerfælled Torv in the Østerbro district of Copenhagen, the capital of Denmark. The debate, organized by the Lars Vilks Committee, was scheduled to include discussion on the attack in January against the French satirical weekly Charlie Hebdo.

An armed man attempted to make his way into the cultural centre while avoiding the main entrance. After failing to do so, at 15:33 he encountered 55-year-old film director Finn Nørgaard, who tried to stop him, but he was shot and killed with a single round from a stolen M/95 rifle. Nørgaard was attending the event but was on his way to the backyard just for a moment when he faced the gunman. The attacker then fired 27 more rounds from the same weapon through the window of the cultural centre, wounding three police officers. Two of the injured officers were bodyguards belonging to the Danish Security and Intelligence Service. The three Danish police officers, along with two Swedish officers assigned to protect Vilks, returned fire and the attacker fled. At least 30 bullet holes were visible in the window of the centre. French Ambassador to Denmark François Zimeray, who was a keyspeaker at the event and close to the attacker, stated, "Intuitively I would say there were at least 50 gunshots, and the police here are saying 200." During the attack, the Ambassador threw himself on the ground and after a few moments succeeded to escape through a backdoor. He mentions these moments of terror in his book: J'ai vu partout le même visage (published in French and Danish), "I only needed a very short glimpse to know that I had to throw myself on the ground and also that what had just happened in Paris was happening now in Copenhagen, all of us, in the middle of this chaotic room, would be killed immediately, exactly as the editors of Charlie a month earlier.

Other participants included FEMEN activist Inna Shevchenko, who was addressing the audience when the shooting took place; editor at Dagbladet Information Niels Ivar Larsen, who spoke at the meeting and later wrote a detailed account of the shooting; and organizer Helle Merete Brix, the latter describing the attack as targeted at Vilks. According to François Zimeray, "Lars Vilks was the pretext, but we were all the target."

After the attack, the suspect hijacked and fled in a dark-coloured Volkswagen Polo. Police warned eyewitnesses to contact them directly, without approaching the vehicle. The car was later found abandoned a few kilometres away.

The Swedish police officers had the impression that they hit the attacker, and speculated that he may have worn a bulletproof vest, according to unnamed police sources speaking to Sydsvenskan.

=== Great Synagogue shooting ===
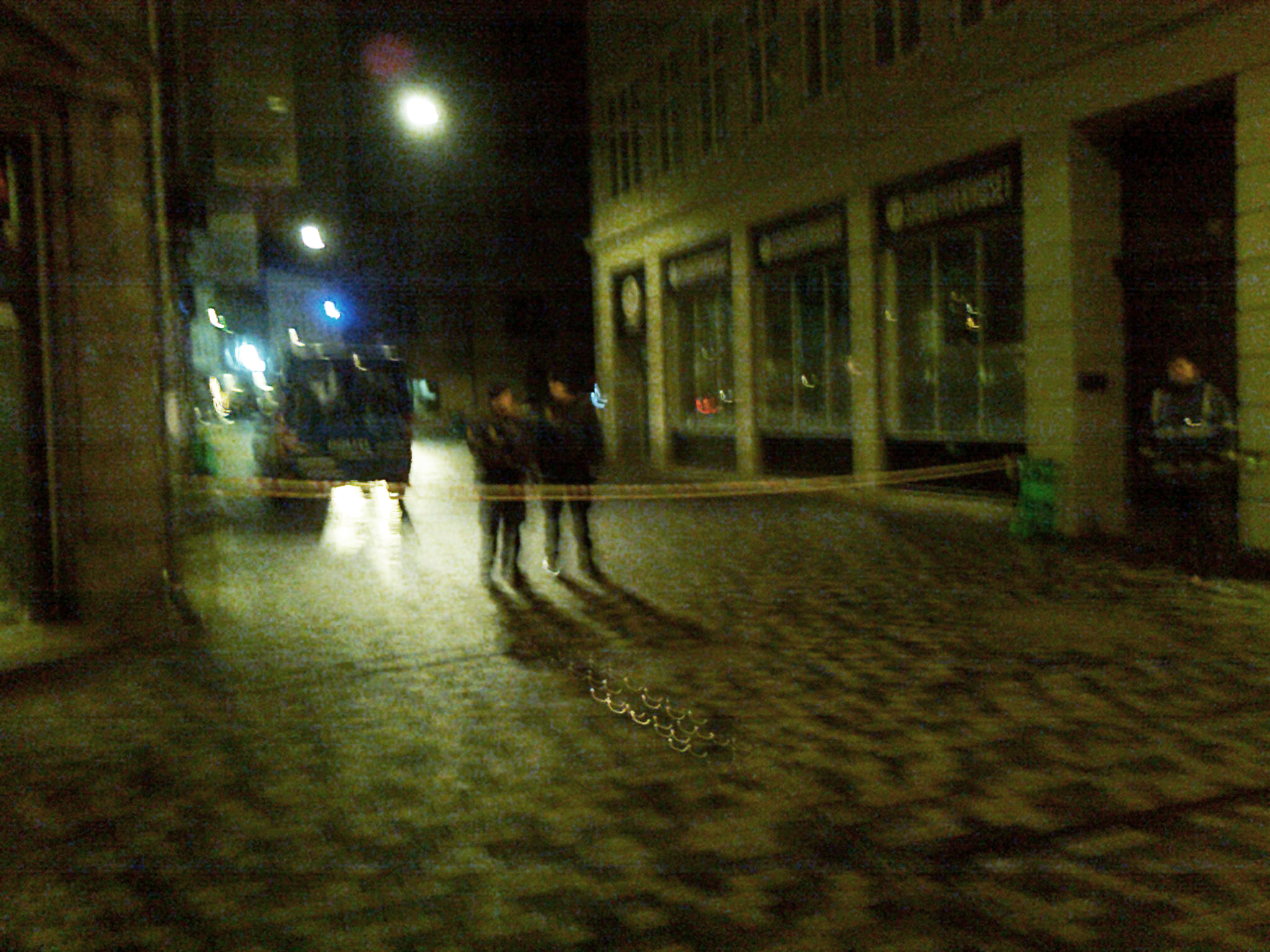
Købmagergade cordoned off by the police 200 m (660 ft) east of the Great Synagogue three hours after the shooting

At 00:50 on 15 February 2015, a second shooting took place at the Great Synagogue on Krystalgade in central Copenhagen. A bat mitzvah ceremony attended by 80 people was taking place there.

The gunman, who pretended to be a drunk approached his target without causing initial suspicion, fired two 7.65 mm rounds and seven 9 mm rounds, hitting Dan Uzan, a 37-year-old Jewish community member on security duty, who later died from the gunshot wound to his head. The gunman also shot and wounded two officers of the Danish Security and Intelligence Service in the arms and legs.

The gunman escaped without managing to enter the building and was not injured by shots fired by the officers. Police evacuated nearby Nørreport Station, the country's busiest rail hub, and did not allow any trains to stop there.

=== Suspect killed ===
Security forces observed the shooter on CCTV coverage. In the early morning of 15 February, the man approached an apartment building the police had under surveillance, which the shooter had visited between the two attacks. When they called out to him, he began firing at them.

In an exchange of gunfire in which the shooter fired one 7.65 mm round and two 9 mm rounds, the police shot and killed him at around 04:50. He died at the corner of Svanevej and Frederikssundsvej, one block west of Nørrebro station in north Copenhagen. The chief police inspector confirmed that the deceased was the culprit behind the shootings.

According to the legal counsel of the two police officers who shot the shooter, they fired at least 30 shots before he collapsed, causing the lawyer to believe the shooter was wearing a bulletproof vest.

== Perpetrator ==
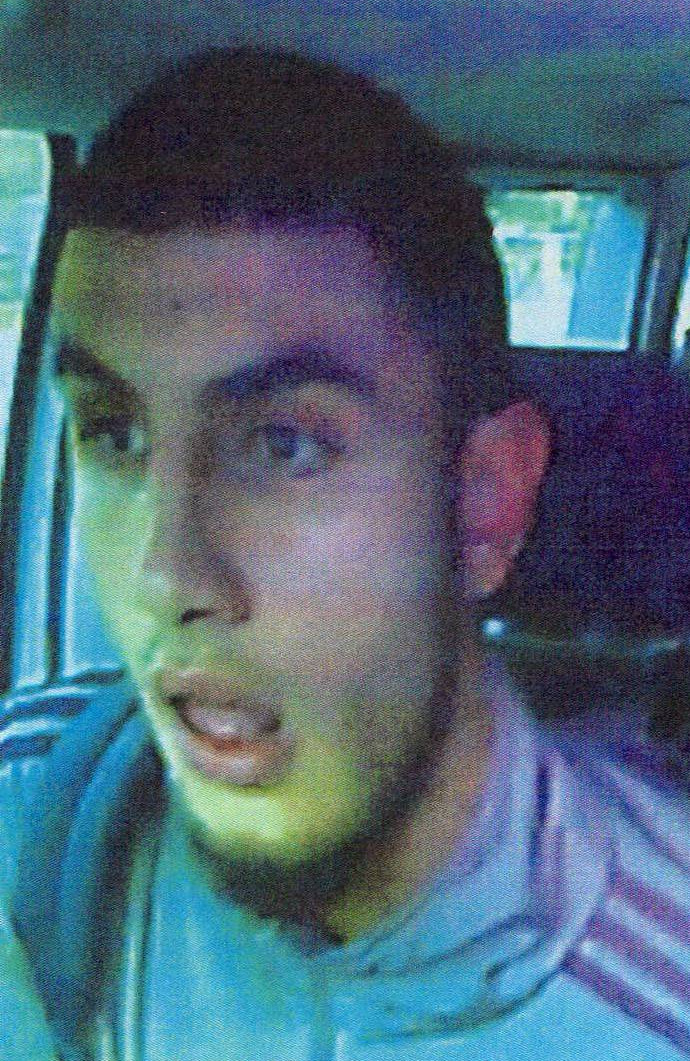
Omar El-Hussein

Omar Abdel Hamid El-Hussein (Arabic: عمر عبد الحميد الحسين, romanized: ʿUmar ʿAbd al-Ḥamīd al-Ḥusayn; 11 September 1992 – 15 February 2015), a 22-year-old man, was identified as the suspected shooter. He was born in Vordingborg, Denmark, to Jordanian-Palestinian parents, and grew up in Copenhagen and in Jordan. Danish police previously stated that the subject was 22 years old and well known to the Danish intelligence services.

El-Hussein spent most of his childhood in Mjølnerparken in Nørrebro. When he was in primary school, his parents divorced and he lived with his mother. When he was twelve years old, his mother sent him to Jordan where he spent three years. Upon returning to Denmark he had problems in school. He for a time attended a Higher Preparatory Examination at a Danish Voksenuddannelsescenter (VUC) in Hvidovre. He became a member of the Brothas gang in Mjølnerparken, and was sentenced twice for violence, possession of an illegal weapon, and hashish possession before 2013.

He was a visitor to the al-Faruq mosque in Nørrebro, a mosque whose imam in 2017 posted a video of his sermon on YouTube which encouraged the murder of Jews.

In November 2013, the police wanted El-Hussein for an indiscriminate knife attack on a man riding a suburban train in Copenhagen. He was arrested in January 2014, and remanded in custody. The prison had concerns about his bizarre and fanatical behaviour in prison and filed report to the Danish Intelligence Service in September 2014, as they found that he had changed behaviour and become "extremely religious". In December 2014, he was sentenced to two years in prison. He was, however, released on 30 January 2015, after having been imprisoned for one year (11 months in custody before sentencing and 1½ month after).

CNN reported that he "swore fidelity to ISIS leader Abu Bakr al-Baghdadi in a posting made on what's apparently his Facebook page just before the weekend shooting spree."

=== Alleged helpers ===
Shortly after the two attacks, four migrants residing in Denmark were arrested at various addresses in Copenhagen and charged under the anti-terrorism legislation: Two for helping to dispose of the M/95 assault rifle used in the Krudttønden attack, one for being in possession of ammunition identical to that used in the Great Synagogue attack (some of which is believed to have been handed over to the perpetrator), and all four for providing clothes, a backpack and internet access to the perpetrator in the period in between the Krudttønden and Great Synagogue attack.

Amid heavy security a major court case against the four defendants began in Copenhagen Municipal Court in March 2016. On the first day of the court case, the court ban against naming the four was lifted by the judge. Some Danish and international media chose to name the four defendants, some chose not to. All four are affiliated with or members of immigrant criminal gangs in Copenhagen and have extensive criminal records covering minor crimes such as theft to more serious convictions for armed robbery, assault, attempted murder and possession of illegal and dangerous weapons and explosives. The four were named as; 26-year-old Bhostan Hussain, 31-year-old Mahmoud Rabea, 23-year-old Ibrahim Abbas, and 20-year-old Liban Salesian Elmi. The court case has been marred by interruptions and outbursts from Rabea, who amongst other things called the female judge "a pig", "a nazi-whore" and asked her to perform fellatio on him. These insults uttered in a public court house are punishable by Danish law with up to six months in jail and according to Danish media Rabea has been charged for the offences.

== Victims ==
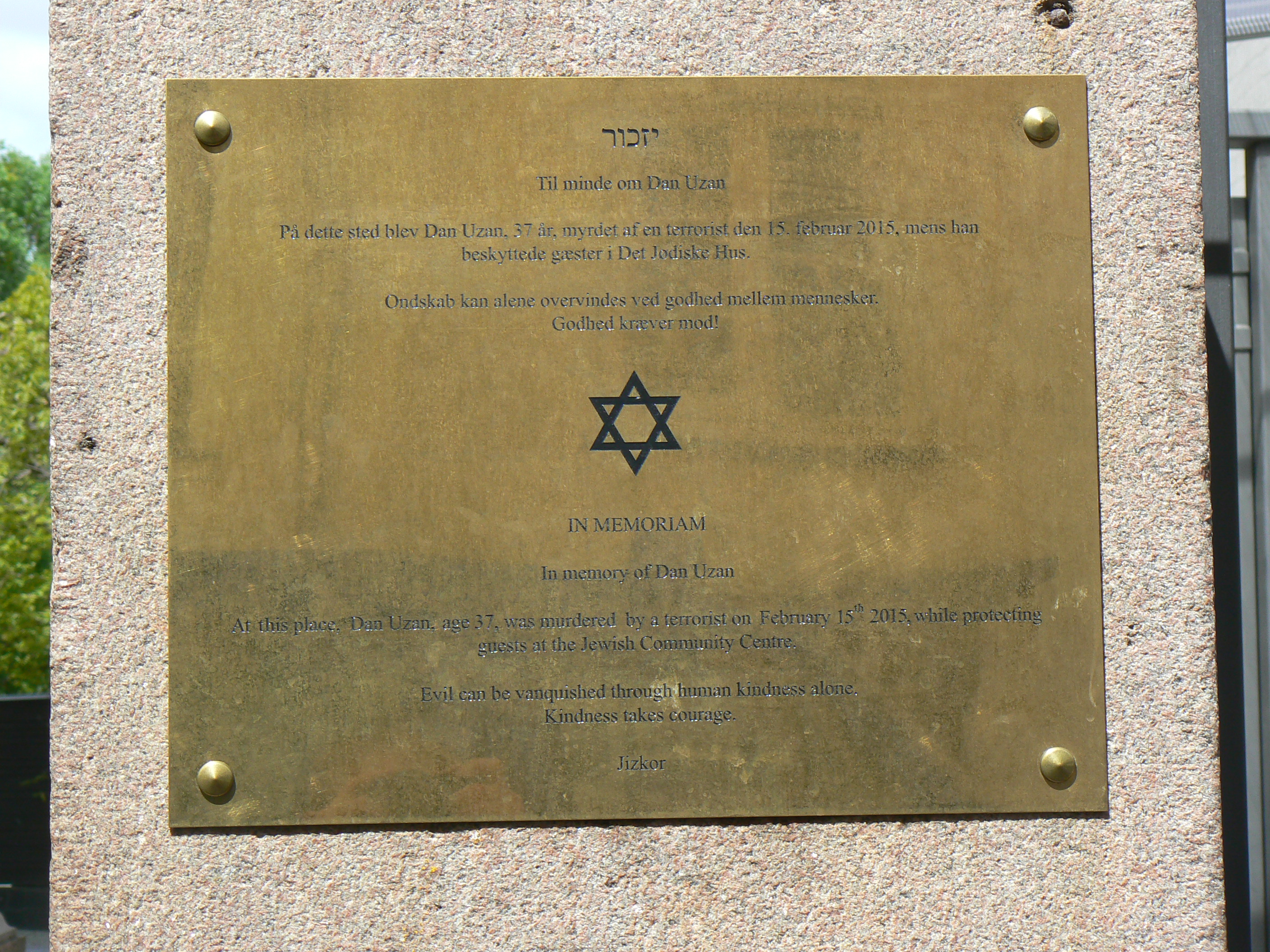
In memory of Dan Uzan. The plaque in Great Synagogue of Copenhagen, which commemorates the terrorist attack

Film director Finn Nørgaard, aged 55, was killed with a single shot from an M/95 in the Krudttønden attack. Nørgaard directed and produced documentaries for Danish television.

Dan Uzan, a 37-year-old volunteer security guard, was killed in the Great Synagogue attack. At the time, a bat mitzvah ceremony was taking place in the synagogue, with about 80 people in attendance. Uzan, the son of a Danish mother and Israeli father, was Jewish, and his family are active members of the Copenhagen Jewish community. Uzan was buried at Copenhagen's Jewish Western Cemetery on 18 February 2015, with Prime Minister Thorning-Schmidt among those attending. Police snipers guarded the funeral.

Five police officers were wounded in the attacks, but none of their injuries were life-threatening and all had been discharged from hospital within three days of the Great Synagogue attack.

== Investigation ==
Danish police stated that they investigated the case as an act of terror, and possibly an assassination attempt on Vilks, though they did not know the motive of the perpetrator.

On 16 February 2015, the police reported that one of the injured officers had received a shot to the chest but his bulletproof vest prevented it from seriously injuring him.

Later the same day, the police reported that at Krudttønden the attacker used a variant of the Colt Canada C7 rifle issued as M/95 to the armed forces in Denmark, while he used a pistol at the synagogue. The police further reported that two men aged 19 and 22 have been charged with helping the attacker dispose of the assault rifle.

On 17 February, police confirmed the shooter's identity, that the two pistols fired during the synagogue attack were recovered from the shooter at Svanevej, and that the M/95 recovered near Mjølnerparken was indeed used during the attack at Krudttønden. The following day, the police reported that the M/95 had been issued to the Danish Home Guard but had been burgled from a private home.

== Aftermath ==
Dagbladet Information published a photo of flowers laid where the killer died. Politiken reported "the perpetrator also gets flowers". The Jyllands-Posten reported that at 16:30 local time the same day, a group of 30 young masked men removed the flowers. The New York Times reported that the group "shouted 'Allahu akbar', or 'God is great', as they removed flowers laid in memorial". The Local of Sweden reported, "One of the men told reporters that they removed the flowers because it is not a Muslim tradition to lay flowers for dead people." A wire from Agence France Presse published by La Dernière Heure of Belgium read, "An elderly woman, who brought flowers but did not wish to be identified, said 'the boy didn't know what he was doing'". The National Post of Canada reported, "'We've put flowers here because we must remember him,' said a young Arab man, who gave his name as Mohammed. 'He was a good guy. We don't believe he did anything wrong.'"

TV2 Denmark reported, "The many flowers at the perpetrator's death place has led to many reactions both in Danish and international media."

On 20 February around 600–700 people, the majority of whom were young Muslim men, attended the burial of the killer who was interred at the Muslim burial site in Brøndby. The Friday prayer at the mosque, which had been followed by a brief ceremony for the gunman, drew an estimated 3,000 people, reported by mosque guards to be double the usual number, leading many to have to stand outside the mosque during the sermon.

== Reactions ==
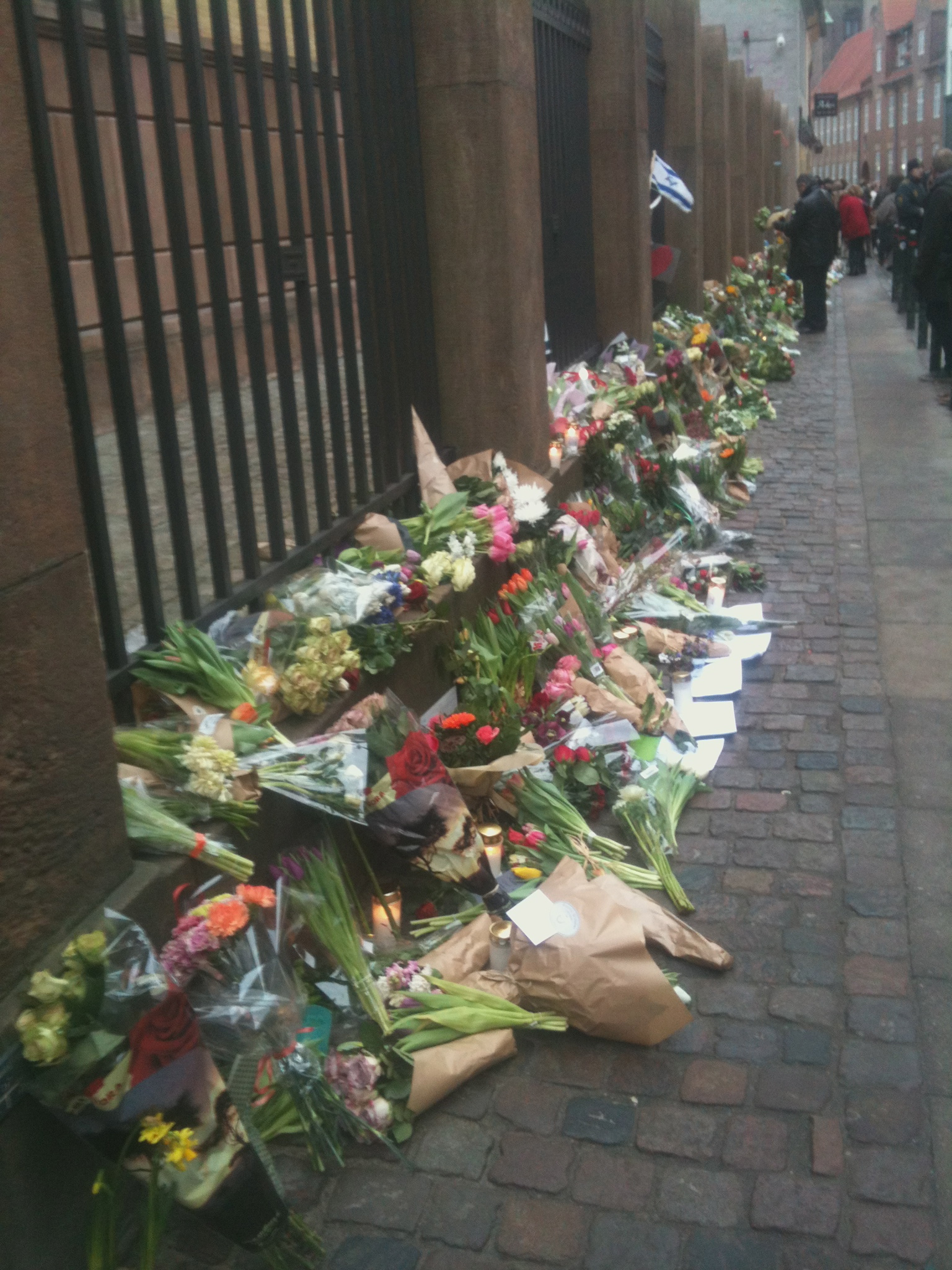
Flowers in front of the Great Synagogue on 15 February, after Dan Uzan was killed

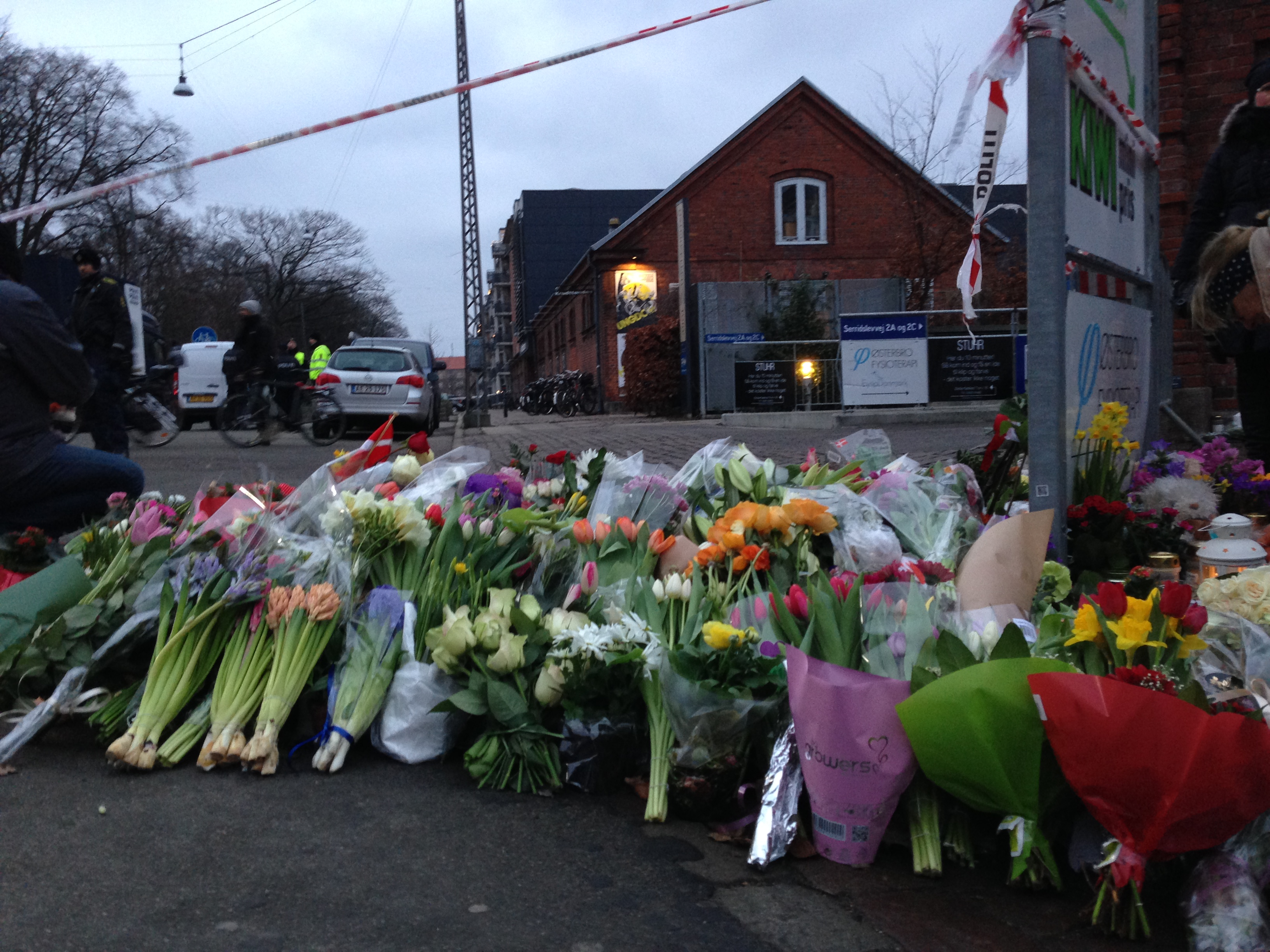
Memorial at Krudttønden

=== National ===
Queen Margrethe II of Denmark wrote in response, "It is with sadness that I learn the extent of the past days' events. My thoughts are with the slain filmmaker and the young guard from the Jewish community, who became the target of the perpetrator's actions. It is important that we in such a serious situation stand together and cherish the values that Denmark is based on." Prime Minister Helle Thorning-Schmidt condemned the "cynical act of terror" and stated, "We don't know the motive for the attacks but we know that there are forces that want to harm Denmark, that want to crush our freedom of expression, our belief in liberty. We are not facing a fight between Islam and the West, it is not a fight between Muslims and non-Muslims." Danish ambassador to Israel Jesper Vahr urged Danish Jews not to leave Denmark and said, "We will do everything in our power so that the Jewish community in Denmark feels safe."

The synagogue's Rabbi Jair Melchior stated, "Terror is not a reason to move to Israel ... Hopefully the [police] should do what they do, but our lives have to continue naturally. Terror's goal is to change our lives and we won't let it ... We lost a dear member of the community and now we have to continue doing what he did, which was helping to continue regular Jewish lives in Denmark. This is the real answer to [this] vicious, cruel and cowardly act of terror." The Danish Islamic Council condemned the attack, saying, "The Danish Islamic Council invites everyone in Danish society to unite in the fight against extremism and terrorism."

=== Security ===
Jens Madsen of the Danish Security and Intelligence Service resigned in May just a few hours before the release of a report detailing the police response to the two shooting. It revealed that it took four hours from the first shooting for police protection to be present at the synagogue, which Justice Minister Mette Frederiksen deemed "not satisfactory." Despite prison authorities warning that El-Hussein was at risk of radicalisation, the Danish Intelligence Service stated that it had "no reason" to believe he was planning the attacks.

=== International ===
The attacks were condemned by foreign leaders, including Australian Prime Minister Tony Abbott, French President François Hollande, Dutch Prime Minister Mark Rutte, Norwegian Prime Minister Erna Solberg, Romanian President Klaus Iohannis, Sahrawi President Mohamed Abdelaziz and British Prime Minister David Cameron.

Israeli Prime Minister Benjamin Netanyahu (campaigning for reelection at the time) stated, "We send our condolences to the Danish people, and also to the Jewish community in Denmark. Once again Jews are murdered on the soil of Europe just for being Jews. This wave of terror attacks is expected to continue, including these murderous anti-Semitic attacks. Obviously Jews deserve protection in every country, but ... Israel is the home of every Jew ... Israel awaits you with open arms." In response to Netanyahu's statement, Danish Chief Rabbi Melchior declared himself "disappointed", and said that, "Terror is not a reason to move to Israel".

=== International organizations ===
The European Commission released a statement condemning the attack, saying, "The European Commission and the High Representative deplore the attacks in Copenhagen costing the life of at least two citizens and injuring several others. Even one life is one too many. Our thoughts are with the victims and their families. Europe stands united with Denmark in upholding freedom of speech and freedom of expression. We stand against anti-Semitism and all forms of discrimination. Europe will not be intimidated." European Council President Donald Tusk called the attack "another brutal terrorist attack targeted at our fundamental values and freedoms, including the freedom of expression."

Jodie Ginsberg, CEO of Index on Censorship, said, "The ability to express ourselves freely, to attend meetings and debates without fear of violence, is fundamental to a free society. Free speech must be protected."

The Norwegian Ahmadiyya Muslim Community, running Scandinavia's largest mosque, condemned the attacks. Haroon Chaudhry, a spokesman of the mosque, spoke of the importance of mosques to publicly denounce acts of terrorism and extremism. Claiming that these acts of terror were in contradiction to Quranic teachings, he said, "The Quran states explicitly that blasphemy is not punishable."

In a press release, the Scandinavian branch of Islamist group Hizb ut-Tahrir did not condemn the attacks but said Danish politicians, among others, were to blame. They specifically said, "Danish politicians and opinion-formers hold no moral authority to designate neither Muslims nor Islam as violent, when you consider how much blood they have on their hands. ... We, as a Muslim community, should under no circumstances succumb to pressure and accept the premise that Islam is on trial."

== See also ==
- 1985 Copenhagen bombings by Hezbollah
- 2010 Copenhagen terror plot
- Contemporary antisemitism in Denmark
- Curtis Culwell Center attack
- Jyllands-Posten Muhammad cartoons controversy
- Kurt Westergaard—Danish cartoonist targeted in an attack in 2010
- Lars Hedegaard—Danish author targeted in an attack in 2013
- Terrorism in the European Union
