= François Zimeray =

French politician, ambassador

French Ambassador to Denmark
- In office 8 October 2013 – 6 July 2018
- Succeeded by: Caroline Ferrari

President of the Rouen Urban District Community
- In office 2008–2013

Member of the European Parliament
- In office 20 July 1999 – 19 July 2004

Chairman of the Greater Rouen Sanitation Syndicate
- In office 1995–2000

Departmental Councillor, Normandy
- In office 1994–1999

Chairman of the District and Community Environment Committee
- In office 1995–2001

Mayor of Petit-Quevilly; Vice-President of Greater Rouen-Normandy Area
- In office 1989–2001

Personal details
- Born: July 4, 1961 (age 65) France
- Party: Party of European Socialists (July 1999 - July 2004)
- Occupation: Lawyer, Politician
- Awards: Prix Pierre Simon (2016)

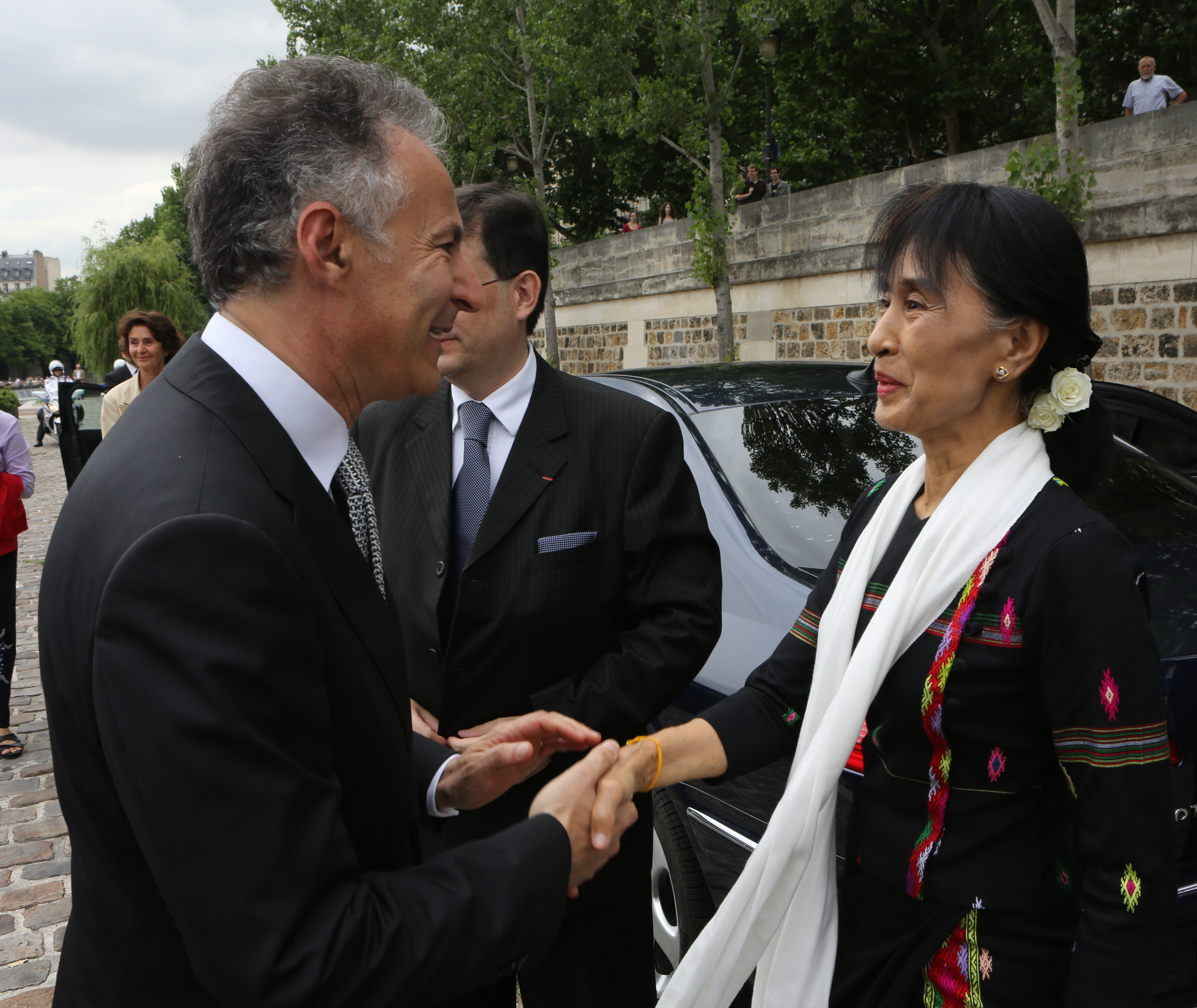
François Zimeray and Aung San Suu Kyi - Paris - 2012

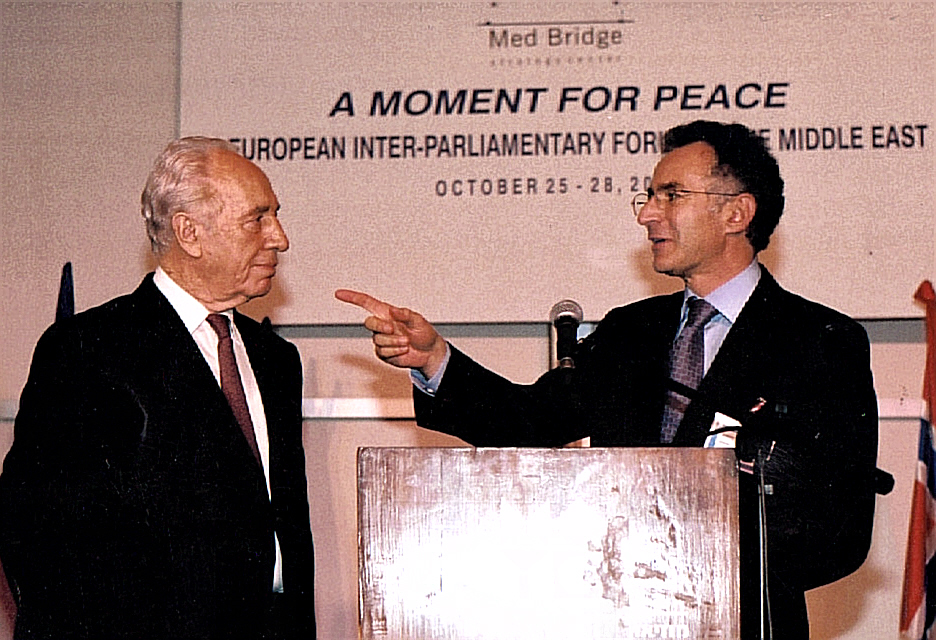
Zimeray and Shimon Peres

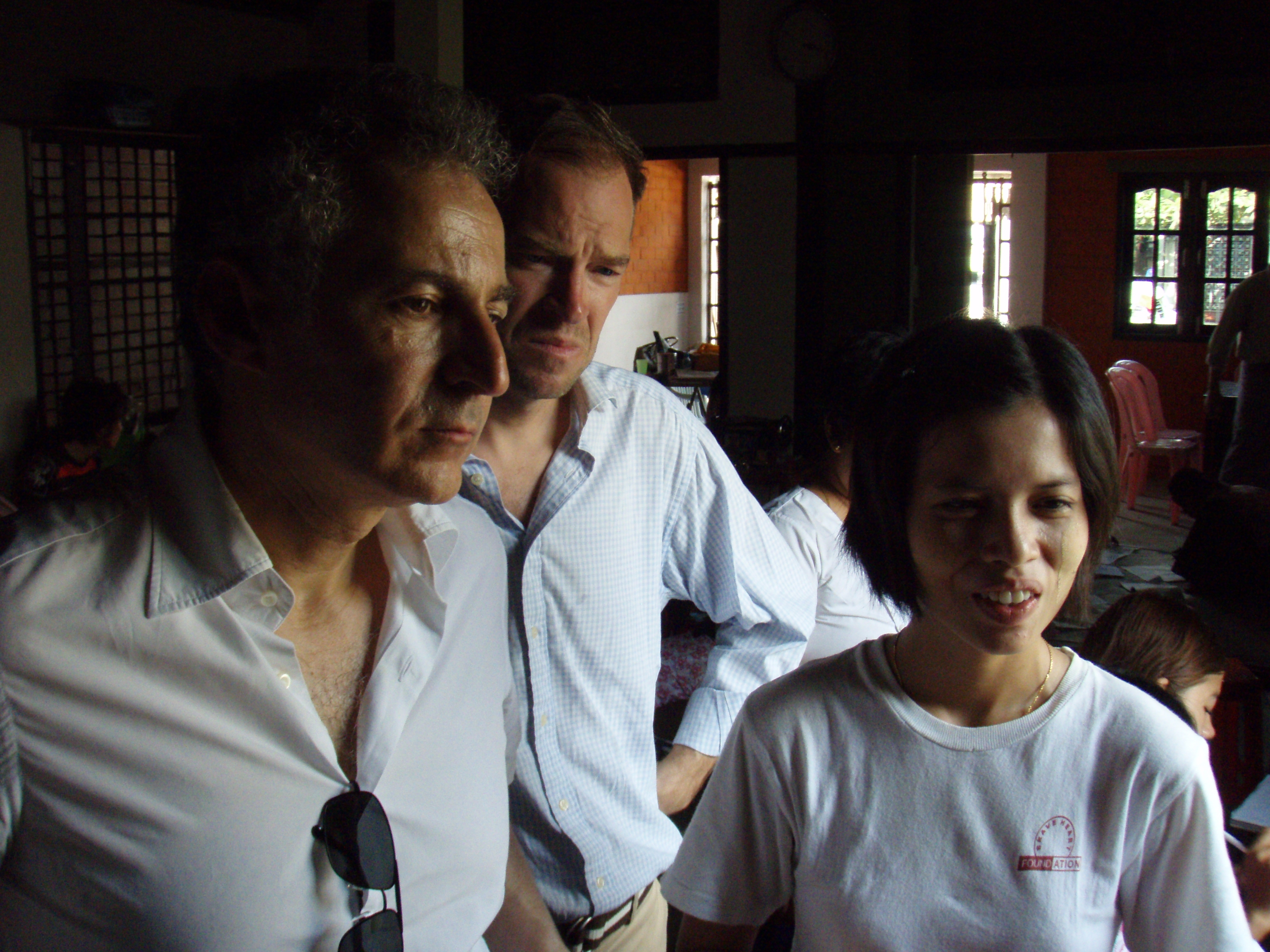
Burma 2010

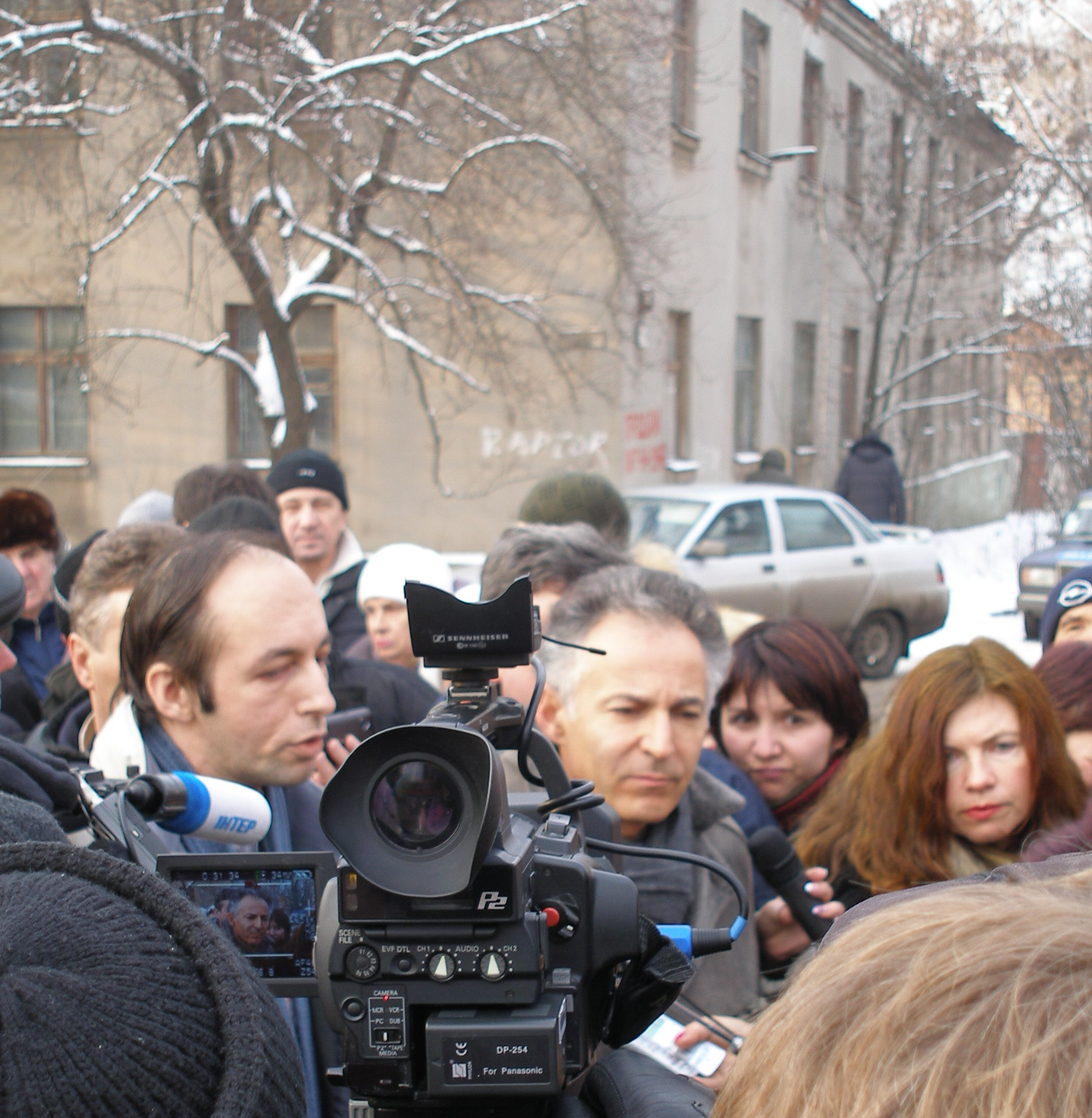
François Zimeray in front of Kharkov prison (Ukraine), trying to meet Yulia Tymoshenko

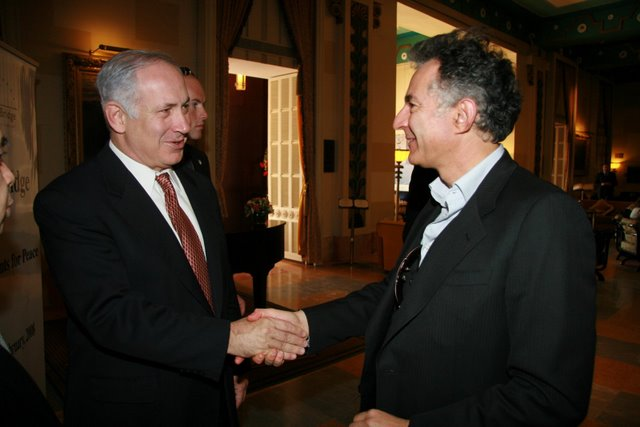
Benjamin Netanyahu and François Zimeray, 2008

François Zimeray is a lawyer, former politician, human rights activist and diplomat. Born on 4 July 1961, he was a Member of the European Parliament for the Party of European Socialists from 1999 to 2004. Former mayor of Petit-Quevilly, he served as President of the Greater Rouen - Normandy area from 2001 to 2008.

He was appointed on 13 February 2008 as French Ambassador-at-large for Human Rights by Nicolas Sarkozy and Bernard Kouchner. Zimeray served as the French Ambassador to Denmark from 2013 to 2018. He nearly lost his life in the 2015 Copenhagen shootings, Islamist terror attack on February 14, 2015, where he was targeted together with other activists.

== Early life ==
François Zimeray was born to Jewish parents from Morocco and Algeria. Zimeray grew up in Paris.

== Career ==
=== Law firm Zimeray & Finelle ===
In September 2018, on his return from Denmark, he established together with Jessica Finelle the law firm Zimeray & Finelle.

At the same time, he joins with Prince Zeid and Shirin Ebadi, Nobel Peace Prize, a team of lawyers very committed to the defense of fundamental rights in the London firm Doughty Street Chambers.

In November 2018, the Internal Political Committee of the National Assembly of Venezuela chaired by Juan Guaidó, designates François Zimeray to advise and assist him in the international courts and institutions regard to the serious violations of human rights committed in the country.

In December 2018, he defended the interests of Saif ul Malook, Asia Bibi's lawyer, a Pakistani Christian sentenced to death for blasphemy and acquitted at the end of October after having spent nine years in prison. In February 2019 he launched an appeal to the European heads of state to ask them to give Saif ul Malook "the protection and the status that his heroism calls". With the support of Lawyers Without Borders, SOS Eastern Christians and Bars, he calls on European leaders to allow Saif Al Malook to reside and work freely in Europe.

As a French lawyer mandated by the NGO European Saudi Organization for Human Rights (ESOHR) he defended Rahaf Mohammed in 2019 in Bangkok against deportation back to Saudi Arabia. Rahaf Mohammed, who fled in Bangkok, had intended to claim asylum in Australia and escape her family who she says abused her and threatened to kill her for amongst other reasons leaving Islaman act that is also a capital offence under Saudi law.

In April 2019, together with Matthias Fekl and Jessica Finelle, he seized the Special Rapporteur on the Promotion and Protection of Freedom of Expression of the United Nations to denounce the fate of the Egyptian writer Alaa Al Aswany prosecuted in a military court and banned from published for 5 years in Egypt. The same year, he became one of the two French lawyers defending Carlos Ghosn during his incarceration in Japan. At the request of the family, they both seized the UN to denounce a detention that he considers as "medieval".

In 2020, the UN Working Group on Arbitrary Detention found that the detention of Carlos Ghosn in Japan was arbitrary and in violation of human rights. He also became involved in the defense of a rape and sequestration victim in Switzerland allegedly committed by a Swiss theologist.

In 2021, he obtained the release of Fabien Azoulay, a 43-year-old French-American entrepreneur who was arrested during a trip to Turkey and sentenced to 20 years in prison for ordering rim cleaner online, unaware that the product had recently been banned in that country.

=== Ambassador for Human Rights ===
As France's Ambassador for Human Rights since February 2008, Zimeray has helped spread the culture of human rights into the French diplomacy. He has been the first non-career diplomat to hold this position since its creation in 2000 and has also had the longest assignment so far.

Zimeray has worked with five different Ministers of Foreign Affairs and Secretary of State: Bernard Kouchner, Michèle Alliot-Marie, Alain Juppé, Rama Yade and Laurent Fabius, then President of the COP21. He was chosen to present France's Universal Periodic Review (UPR) at the Human Rights Council in 2008 and 2012, as well as to represent France to the Alliance of Civilizations and Durban II Conference.

Since then, near to 100 diplomatic missions have led him to the Syrian border, Chechnya, Colombia, Gaza, Israel, Sri Lanka camps, Turkmenistan, Burma, Moscow, Thailand, Baghdad, Jordan, Lebanon, Kirghizstan, Uganda, Chad, Burundi, Congo, Rwanda, Libya, Algeria, Egypt, Nepal, among others.

In October 2011, he went to Tripoli just a few days after the death of former leader Muammar Gaddafi. In November 2011, he was one of the first diplomats to be received in Rangoon by the Lady Aung San Suu Kyi, one month before the official visit of US Secretary of State Hillary Clinton. In January and April 2012, François Zimeray went twice to the Kharkiv prison, attempting to visit former Prime Minister of Ukraine Yulia Tymoshenko. Although he was not allowed to enter the prison and see her, he attended the opening session of her second trial and denounced "accusations obviously politically grounded".

Zimeray represented the French diplomacy by attending several trials. He went to Moscow for Mikhail Khodorkovsky's trial, to Kazakhstan to support the human rights defender Yevgeny Zhovtis. In January 2011, he went to Yuriy Lutsenko's trial, in Kyiv. In November 2012, he managed to visit Lydienne Yen-Eyoum in prison, a French-Cameroonian lawyer arbitrarily detained in Cameroon since July 9, 2011. She was released from prison in 2016, after her arrest and detention were found to be arbitrary by the United Nations. In May 2013, he also visited Bangladesh after the 2013 Dhaka garment factory collapse to meet the families of the victims at the ENAM hospital in Savar, and express France's solidarity. In Dhaka, he then met with the authorities and all stakeholders contributing to the improvement of Labor Rights and conditions in Bangladesh and pointed out the human rights issues raised by the factory collapse.

In accordance with EU Guidelines on Human Rights Defenders, François Zimeray set the following goal: "Each French embassy has to become a 'House of Human rights'."

As Ambassador in charge of the Holocaust issues, Zimeray launched different initiatives to raise awareness about contemporary antisemitism: he went to Auschwitz several times and supports important projects enhancing dialogue between cultures, such as the Aladdin Project, which had been presented in Baghad in February 2010.

=== Ambassador to Denmark ===
On October 8, 2013, François Zimeray presented his credentials to the Queen of Denmark. On February 14, 2015, following the Paris terrorist attacks, Zimeray was invited to give the keynote speech at Krudttønden in Copenhagen, a debate on freedom of expression and blasphemy, featuring Lars Vilks and Femen leader Inna Chevtchenko, when it was attacked by a masked gunman.

=== Human rights and peace activism ===
Zimeray's commitment to human rights dates back to 1979, when, then aged 17, he founded an association to support and cater for Cambodian refugees in Paris. Thereafter, he made visit to refugee camps on the Thai border, where he forged his political beliefs. Since then, his commitment for human rights has never ended.

He played a decisive role in the organisation of the European campaign in support for Darfur. In 2007, he visited the Darfur refugee camps in Chad with the French philosopher, Bernard-Henri Lévy. He raised awareness and managed to mobilize French public opinion as well as political leaders.

In May 2009, Zimeray founded the Alliance of Lawyers for Human rights, based in Paris offering free legal expertise to associations, NGOs and institutions working in the field of human rights.

Zimeray is also a prominent figure well known for his committed support for the Palestinian moderates and the Israeli "peace camp" in 2002. He actively supports The People's Voice, the initiative by Palestinian Sari Nusseibeh and Israeli Ami Ayalon. François Zimeray went to Gaza twice and described the attitude of people defining themselves as exclusively in favour of one side against the other ("pro-palestinian" or "pro-Israel") as "intellectual hooliganism" (speech at the French National Assembly for "Kids creating Peace").

He founded the Cercle Léon Blum and worked to promote dialogue between European leaders and Middle Eastern political and civil society representatives as Chairman of the Medbridge Strategy Center founded in Brussels with prominent European politicians such as Willy De Clercq, François Léotard, Emma Bonino and Ana Palacio. He then had several meetings with Shimon Peres, Mahmoud Abbas and King Abdullah II of Jordan.

=== Lawyer ===
Zimeray is a member of the Paris Bar and the International Criminal Bar of The Hague. He has represented victims in trials of Khmer Rouge leaders, successfully campaigned to free imprisoned political opponents in Laos, and defended a child soldier in Congo/Kinshasa before the International Criminal Court. He has also defended cases before the European Court of Human Rights.

During twenty years, Zimeray has worked as a lawyer in the firm Jeantet&Associés. Back then, he advised individuals as well as French and international companies. With his partners, Hubert Védrine and Jean-Pierre Jouyet, he took part in the international development of the Jeantet firm.

Zimeray is a member of the French Institute of International Legal Experts (IFEJI).

He created with Jessica Finelle (September 2018) the lawyer firm Zimeray&Finelle.

=== Member of the European Parliament ===
At 37, Zimeray became the youngest member of the French socialist delegation at the European Parliament, elected on Francois Hollande's list. He worked in the Legal Affairs Committee and the Foreign Affairs and Defence Policy Committee. He is the author of eight reports adopted unanimously and took part in the framing of the Charter of Fundamental Rights.

In 2000, he was the sponsor of a European Parliament motion for a resolution against female genital mutilation. The next year, at the request of Emma Bonino, former Humanitarian Aid Commissioner, François Zimeray went to Laos in order to defend and free a member of the European Parliament, as well as four other human rights defenders.

Although member of the socialist group, he did not hesitate to defend the parliamentarian immunities of Charles Pasqua (PPE) and Marco Pannella (PVE), respectively in 2002 and 2003.

But for the 2004 election, the socialist party choose another candidate to represent them, judging Zimeray too anti-Palestinian.

=== Local official ===
Zimeray, identified by former Prime Minister Laurent Fabius, first made his mark in 1989 when at just 27 years old he was elected Mayor of Petit-Quevilly (23,000 inhabitants). He became the youngest mayor of a town with over 20,000 inhabitants in France and founded the first association of mayors for environment, "Eco-Maires".

He transformed the city by creating parks, accommodation, new areas and facilities such as the multimedia library François Truffaut. He was re-elected two times in the first round. In 2001, he was elected President of the Greater Rouen-Normandy area (37 cities, 450,000 inhabitants) and launched several urban and cultural projects: the Palais des Sports (designed by Dominique Perrault), the renovation of the docks and public transportations (metro, cycle).

== Views ==
=== On Human Rights ===
Zimeray has stated "We face a frequent misunderstanding. Many people place human rights in some kind of moral area and wait for us to answer with symbols, declarations and gestures.One must have the courage to say that Human Rights are not morality, they are rights that exist or does not exist, that are applied or violated: the right to not be tortured, access to fair trial, equality between men and women. Our action does not only take place in some declaratory and narcissistic style."

Zimeray has commented that he does not like the expression that France is "the country of human rights" and stated "I know the state of French prisons... I would rather say that France and Human Rights are like an old couple, and as with every couple there are ups and downs.

In his book published after the Copenhagen terror attack he survived (February 14, 2015) he advocates against patriarchy : "But if, at the end of this journey, I had to choose just one cause that stands above all others, I now know that our determination to empower women to achieve their full potential – particularly by educating girls – will speak volumes about the future of humanity. It is a cause we can all subscribe to, and I know no higher one. (..) Around the world I have seen women challenge the patriarchal order that subjects them to violence and forces men to serve the empire of domination and performance." The book, "J'ai vu partout le même visage" ("I have seen the same face everywhere I went") - "An Ambassador comes face to face with man's inhumanity to man" was granted the Pierre Simon Ethics and geopolitics prize in Paris City hall. (Plon, Paris 2016)

In 2021, he also participated in a collective work paying tribute to Afghan women short after the take-over of Afghanistan by the Talibans.

=== Israeli-Palestinian conflict ===
Francois Zimeray has called himself "a friend of Israel". In 2003, Zimeray said the EU should investigate whether its donations to the Palestinian Authority were being used to fund terrorism against Israel. Zimeray said "Europe has for too long closed its eyes to the corruption, the misappropriation of aid for education to financial support for propaganda as well as terrorism."

In 2009, Zimeray abstained from a vote endorsing the Goldstone report, which had accused Israel of committing war crimes in the Gaza War (2008–2009).

With respect to the Israeli blockade of the Gaza Strip, François Zimeray said Israel has the right to screen goods that are allowed to enter Gaza. In 2023, Zimeray accused Hamas of genocide in the 2023 Hamas-led attack on Israel.

== Distinctions ==
- Knight of the Legion of Honour (Chevalier de la Légion d'honneur)
- Officer of the Royal Order of Cambodia (Officier de l'Ordre Royal du Cambodge)
- Medal of the Paris Bar (2015)
- Prix Pierre Simon award 2016 category Ethics and Geopolitics Therese Delpech, November 2016

== Anecdotes ==
- He almost lost his life during the 2015 Copenhagen shootings with Femen leader Inna Shevchenko, whom he had reunited with in Copenhagen long after he had helped her come to France when she was under threat for her life in Ukraine.
- All the French Embassies in the world have a facade plaque with the Universal Declaration of Human Rights fixed onto. On these plaques, the preamble of the Declaration is reproduced with Zimeray's handwriting engraved. A plastic replica of these plaques with handwriting was sent to the International Space Station Columbus on November 14, 2008
- After the Arab Spring, Moncef Marzouki, Tunisia's first democratic president and former president of the Tunisian League for Human Rights, thanked François Zimeray when he was received at the European Parliament for his support while he was deprived of his freedom.
- The theater play "Bella Figura", written by Yasmina Reza, is dedicated to Francois Zimeray

== Public office ==
- From 1989 to 2001: Mayor of Petit-Quevilly; Vice-president of Greater Rouen-Normandy Area
- From 1995 to 2001: Chairman of the District and Community Environment Committee
- From 1994 to 1999: Departmental Councillor, Normandy
- From 1995 to 2000: Chairman of the Greater Rouen Sanitation Syndicate
- From 1999 to 2004: Member of the European Parliament; Member of the Legal Affairs Committee; and Member of the Industry, Trade, Research and Energy Committee
- From 2001 to 2008: President of the Rouen Urban District Community; First Deputy to the Mayor of Petit-Quevilly
- From 2008 to 2013: France's Ambassador-at-large for human rights, and Ambassador for Holocaust issues
- From 2013 to 2018: French Ambassador to Denmark
