= Helle Merete Brix =

Danish journalist and author (born 1959)

- Born: 30 December 1959 (age 66)
- Occupations: Author; journalist; literary critic
- Website: hellemeretebrix.com/english/

Helle Merete Brix (born 30 December 1959) is a Danish author, journalist and literary critic. She has been noted as a critic of Islam since the late 1990s, and was formerly associated with the Danish Free Press Society as editor of its online magazine Sappho until 2010, and was later a part of the Lars Vilks Committee.

== Activities and writings ==
Brix has been noted as a writer critical of Islam since at least 1999, even though she was a member of the Danish Social Liberal Party until 2002. She co-authored the book I krigens hus: Islams kolonisering af Vesten about Islam's "colonisation of the West" with Lars Hedegaard in 2003, which has been described as a part of the "Eurabia narrative". She was formerly a member of Danish PEN, but left the organisation in 2004 after it objected to admit Hedegaard as a member. Along with Hedegaard, Brix was later involved with several groupings, as part of the counter-jihad movement.

She was on the board of advisors for Hedegaard's Danish Free Press Society from 2005 to 2007, chief editor of its online magazine Sappho from 2005 to 2010, and on the board of advisors of the International Free Press Society founded in 2009. In 2008 she wrote the book Mod mørket. Det Muslimske Broderskab i Europa discussing the Muslim Brotherhood's activities in Europe. She had left the Danish Free Press Society by the early 2010s, after considering it too irreconcilable to differing viewpoints, and became a literary critic for Weekendavisen.

Brix co-founded the Lars Vilks Committee in 2012, which was established in support of Swedish artist Lars Vilks, known for his Muhammad drawings controversy. In 2015, she was an organiser of the cultural event that was attacked by an Islamist terrorist in the Copenhagen shootings at the Krudttønden cultural centre, during which she hid under a table and in a storage room together with Vilks. The Lars Vilks Committee was dissolved in the late 2010s.

She published the book Gud og Profeten tilgiver ikke. En personlig beretning om terrorangrebet på Krudttønden in 2016 as a personal account of the terror attack at Krudttønden, and in 2018 published the book Blandt kolibrier og kalsjnikover. Om terrorens ofre about victims and people affected by terror attacks.

== Personal life ==
Brix is a Buddhist, who converted to the religion after an interview with Lama Ole Nydahl in 1994, who she also says inspired her criticism of Islam.

== Bibliography ==
- Når kunsten terroriseres. Om terror som tema i kunsten. Co-edited with Nesager-Hansen, Kasper; Vilks, Lars. Underskoven. 2020. ISBN 9788793928121.
- 30 fortællinger. Om frihed, fatwaer og kærlighed. Co-authored with Vilks, Lars. Pressto. 2019. ISBN 9788793716216.
- Blandt kolibrier og kalasjnikover. Om terrorens ofre. DreamLitt. 2018. ISBN 9788771711103.
- Gud og Profeten tilgiver ikke. En personlig beretning om terrorangrebet på Krudttønden. DreamLitt. 2016. ISBN 9788793010543.
- Man forhandler ikke med et maskingevær. En bog om manden og kunstneren Lars Vilks. Co-authored with Jensen, Uwe Max. Document Forlag. 2016. ISBN 9788792417343.
- Sex, frihed og fatwa: Essays. Mellemgaard. 2012. ISBN 9788793305595.
- Mod Mørket: Det Muslimske Broderskab i Europa. Trykkefrihedsselskabets Bibliotek. 2008. ISBN 9788798919872.
- Maskeret Tvang: en antologi. Anthology. Liva. 2006. ISBN 9788799160006.
- Storm over Europa: Islam – fred eller trussel?. Anthology. Holkenfeldt 3. 2006. ISBN 9788791660375.
- Fri Tale: Danske kunstnere om ytringsfrihed. Co-edited with Kholghi, Farshad; Nielsen, Peter Legård. Gyldendal. 2005. ISBN 9788702042832.
- I krigens hus: Islams kolonisering af Vesten. Co-authored with Hansen, Torben; Hedegaard, Lars. Hovedland. 2003. ISBN 9788777396717.
- Islam i Vesten: På koranens vej?. Anthology. Co-edited with Hansen, Torben. Tiderne Skifter. 2002. ISBN 9788774459781.
- I begyndelsen. Tiderne Skifter. 1994. ISBN 9788774456261.
