= Mjølnerparken =

Public housing development in Nørrebro, Copenhagen

Coordinates: 55°42′13.9″N 12°32′32.5″E

- Public housing development
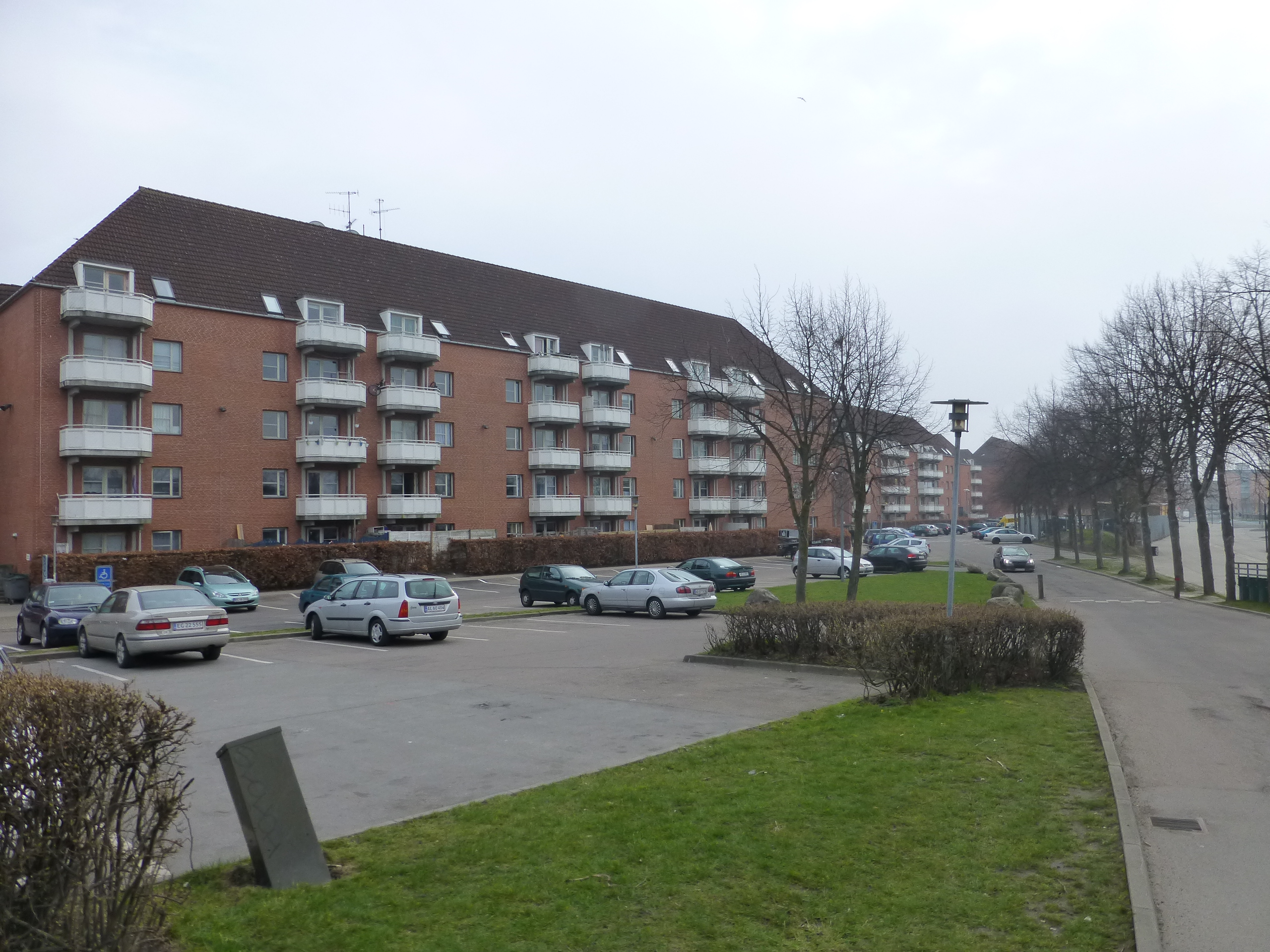
- Interactive map of Mjølnerparken
- Country: Denmark
- Region: Capital Region
- Municipality: Copenhagen
- District: Nørrebro
- Postal code: DK-2200
- Website: Website

Mjølnerparken is a public housing development in Ydre Nørrebro, part of the Nørrebro district of Copenhagen, Denmark. Administered by Bo-Vita, the development contains 560 units accommodating 966 people as of 1 December 2023. The complex opened in 1987.

Mjølnerparken is bordered by Tagensvej to the north, Midgårdsgade and the former railway yard (now Superkilen) to the east, Hothers Plads to the south, and Borgmestervangen and Mimersparken near Bispebjerg railway station to the west.

== History ==
Mjølnerparken is a housing estate in the Nørrebro district of Copenhagen, Denmark, named after Thor's hammer, Mjölnir, which, according to Norse mythology, always hit its target and returned to the god's hand. Starting in 1860, many streets in the area were named after figures from Norse mythology and legends, with the oldest being Odinsgade (Odin's Street), named by a private landowner. This naming tradition was continued by the municipal street naming committee in Ydre Nørrebro. Mjølnerparken itself was named in 1986.

At the turn of the 20th century, the area now occupied by Mjølnerparken was home to various buildings along the railway. During the interwar period, a large factory was established on the site. Mjølnerparken was constructed in the late 1980s on the grounds of a former paper factory that was part of De Forenede Papirfabrikker (The United Paper Factories), which operated from 1933 to 1979. Construction began in 1984, and the estate was ready for occupancy by 1987.

In 2012, the 30,000 m^{2} former freight yard behind Mjølnerparken was redeveloped into Mimersparken, a recreational area with sports fields and a running track, as part of the urban renewal of the Mimersgade Quarter.

As of 2023, Mjølnerparken had 966 residents, predominantly immigrants and descendants from non-Western countries, with a large proportion being under 18. In 1993, about 36% of the residents were of Danish origin. By 2003, this had shifted, with 91% of the population being immigrants or their descendants. By January 2016, the proportion had decreased to 82.6%.

== Social issues and crime ==
Mjølnerparken has long been associated with social challenges and youth crime. The area's removal from the transformation areas list in December 2023, resulted from a decrease in residents to fewer than 1,000, likely due to an ongoing development plan to reduce the proportion of family housing to 40% by 2030. In 2005, Mjølnerparken became one of the first residential areas in Denmark to install surveillance cameras in response to a series of arson attacks on basement storage areas. Though controversial at the time, the measure was immediately effective, and the surveillance was later extended to include outdoor areas and building entrances.

=== Brothas ===
Mjølnerparken is home to the Brothers and Soldiers gang, commonly known as Brothas, which first came to public attention in 2009. The gang was notably involved in the gang conflict between Hells Angels and various immigrant groups between 2008 and 2012. In February 2016, Brothas merged with the German biker gang Black Jackets, though the merger was short-lived. The gang reformed and played a prominent role in the 2017 gang war in Nørrebro against their rivals, Loyal to Familia.

=== Omar El-Hussein ===
Omar Abdel Hamid el-Hussein (1992–2015), the Danish-Palestinian responsible for the 2015 Copenhagen shootings at Krudttønden and the Great Synagogue, had spent much of his upbringing in Mjølnerparken, where he lived with his younger brother.

== Improvements and recent initiatives ==
Various initiatives have been undertaken over the years to improve conditions in Mjølnerparken. During the 2010s, significant progress was made: the percentage of residents aged 18 to 64 who were neither employed nor in education decreased from 53% in 2010 to 44% in 2016. During the same period, the percentage of convicted individuals dropped from 3.3% to 2.7% of the adult population, while income levels and educational attainment in the area improved, according to the government's annual report on developments in Danish ghettos. By 2023, the proportion of residents in this age group without employment or education fell further to 39%, and the rate of convicted individuals decreased to 2.1%.

The most ambitious initiative to date is the comprehensive physical plan for Mjølnerparken, developed by Lejerbo København (named Bo-Vita since 2018) in collaboration with local residents. Adopted in 2015, the plan aims to renovate apartments that have not been updated since their construction in the 1980s, providing new kitchens, bathrooms, ventilation systems, and windows. Some apartments will be removed to accommodate commercial spaces, a daycare center, and larger family units. Additionally, several physical changes will enhance safety in the area, such as repositioning stairwells to open into the street. The plan also aims to improve connectivity with the rest of Nørrebro by establishing a new shopping street leading to Mimersparken and creating a cycling route that links Mimersparken and Superkilen. The objective of these initiatives is for Mjølnerparken to be recognised as a typical residential neighbourhood once the improvements are completed.
