= Lars Vilks =

Swedish artist and activist (1946–2021)

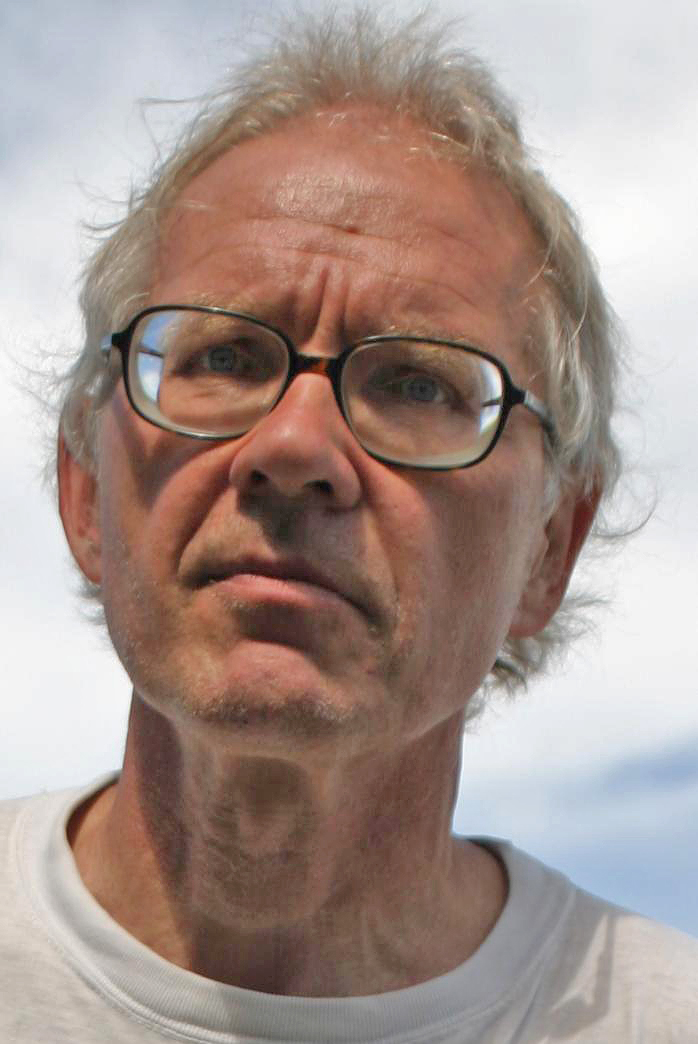
- Vilks at the site of Nimis in Kullaberg in 2005 (Age 58/59)
- Born: Lars Endel Roger Vilks; 20 June 1946; Helsingborg, Sweden
- Died: 3 October 2021 (aged 75); Markaryd, Sweden
- Education: Lund University
- Known for: Muhammad drawings controversy
- Notable work: Nimis (1980); Arx (1991); Muhammad drawings (2007)
- Style: Conceptual art Sculpture; Site-specific art

Lars Endel Roger Vilks (20 June 1946 – 3 October 2021) was a Swedish visual artist and activist who was known for the controversy surrounding his drawings of Muhammad. Many years earlier he had created the sculptures Nimis and Arx, made of driftwood and rock, respectively. The area where the sculptures are located was proclaimed by Vilks as an independent country, "Ladonia".

== Early life and academic career ==
Vilks was born in Helsingborg, Sweden. His second given name Endel was Estonian, given by his father Eino Vilks who was of Estonian and Latvian descent. His mother was Swedish. He earned his doctoral degree in art history from Lund University in 1987, and worked at the Oslo National Academy of the Arts from 1988 to 1997. From 1997 to 2003, he was a professor in art theory at the Bergen National Academy of the Arts. As an art theorist, Vilks was a proponent of the institutional theory of art.

== Artistic career ==
Although an academically trained art theorist, Vilks was a self-taught visual artist. In the 1970s, he started painting, and in 1984, he embarked on creating the idiosyncratic sculptures that are his hallmark, starting with Nimis. At this time, in the early 1980s, postmodernism made its definite entry into the Swedish art scene, using inspiration from e.g. the French art philosopher Jean-François Lyotard. Conceptual artists took the place of the earlier modernists on the contemporary art scene. These conceptual artists did not want their art to have any aesthetic or programmatic content, but often focused on the artist's self. Vilks was part of this movement in Sweden. He turned himself in as a piece of art to the spring saloon at Vikingsberg, Helsingborg, and turned his own car into a piece of art at the fall exhibition at Skånes konstförening.

=== Nimis and Arx ===
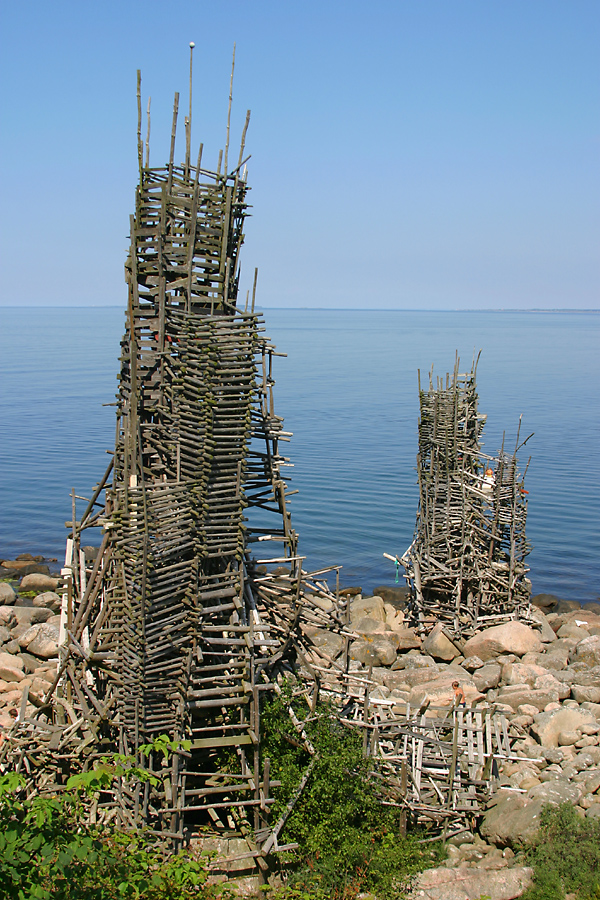
Nimis. Wood sculptures by Vilks at Kullaberg.

In 1980, Vilks created two sculptures, Nimis and Arx, the former made entirely of drift wood and the latter of concrete and rock, in the Kullaberg nature reserve in Höganäs, Skåne. When the local authority found out, it tried to remove them, with fines being imposed, and vandals attacked them with fire and chainsaws. However, in 1996, the small area where the sculptures are located was proclaimed by Vilks as an independent country, "Ladonia". Nimis was sold to Joseph Beuys as a means to circumvent the Swedish building code laws concerning unlawful building process. The sculpture of Nimis was later owned by the late conceptual artist Christo; the legal document documenting the sale is on display at the Swedish Museum of Sketches.

=== Critical reception and media attention ===
Vilks characterized his own skill in the actual crafts involved in sculpture as quite limited, although his artistic ideas can be seen as characteristic of his generation of Swedish conceptual artists. One of the few works of Vilks to be incorporated into a collection is the concrete sculpture Omphalos, measuring 1.6 meters (5 ft 3 in) high and weighing one tonne, which is owned by Moderna Museet after it was first bought by fellow artist Ernst Billgren for 10 000 Swedish kronor.

Vilks' long-standing controversies with different authorities due to his activities in the nature reserve Kullaberg, where Nimis, Arx, and Landonien are all located, received significant attention in Swedish media, which for the most part portrayed Vilks' work as specifically designed to be provocative. This attention has turned the area into something of a tourist attraction. In Vilks' activity as an art theorist, he commented on his own artistic activities in the second or third person. His different works of art, his actions, actions by those authorities with whom Vilks has been in conflict, and the media attention, were brought together in a Gesamtkunstwerk. He described himself as an "equal opportunity offender" in his critical depictions of religion. Indeed, he depicted Christ as a pedophile, as a reference to the scandal in the Catholic church, and also drew a grotesque caricature of "a modern Jew swollen by capitalism".

== Muhammad drawings ==
In 2007, Vilks caused an international controversy when he depicted Muhammad as a roundabout dog in three drawings, designated to be shown at an art exhibition at Tällerud, in July of the same year. Shortly before its opening, the organizers canceled their invitation with reference to serious security concerns, and despite Vilks' effort no other Swedish art gallery offered to exhibit his drawings.

Eventually, on 18 August, one of his drawings was published in the Örebro-based regional newspaper, Nerikes Allehanda, as part of an editorial on self-censorship and freedom of religion, and even though other leading Swedish newspapers had published the drawings before, it was this publication that led to protests from Muslim organizations in Sweden as well as condemnations from several foreign governments including Iran, Pakistan, Afghanistan, Egypt, and Jordan as well as by the inter-governmental Organisation of Islamic Cooperation (OIC), which also called for the Swedish government to take "punitive actions" against Vilks. Following this controversy, Vilks was forced to live under police protection after having received several death threats, including a statement by the al-Qaeda-affiliated Islamic State of Iraq which offered up to $150,000 for his assassination.

=== Assassination plot ===
In 2009, a failed plot to kill Vilks was hatched. Three U.S. citizens, Colleen LaRose ("Jihad Jane"), Mohammad Hassas Khalid, and Jamie Paulin Ramirez, participated in the plot. On 9 March 2010, LaRose's federal indictment was unsealed charging her with trying to recruit Muslims to murder Vilks.

On the same day, seven people were arrested in the Republic of Ireland over an alleged plot to assassinate Vilks. Police officers close to the investigation said those arrested were foreign-born Irish residents, mostly from Yemen and Morocco and had refugee status. Of the seven, three men and two women were arrested in Waterford and Tramore, and another man and woman at Ballincollig, near Cork. Garda Síochána (the Irish police force), which conducted the arrests with support from the National Support Services and the counter-terrorist Special Detective Unit, said the suspects ranged in age from mid 20s to late 40s. The Irish police added that throughout the investigation they had been "working closely with law enforcement agencies in the United States and in a number of European countries".

=== Violent attacks ===
On 11 May 2010, Muslim protesters assaulted Vilks while he was giving a lecture about free speech at Uppsala University. The attacks started when a film about Islam and homosexuality (the video depicts images of topless men, including one brief image of two fully clothed men kissing, all interspersed with Islamic imagery) was shown and some Muslims began to demand that the film be stopped, saying it was gay porn. The film in question was Iranian artist Sooreh Hera's Allah ho Gaybar. Vilks' eyeglasses were broken but he did not suffer any serious injuries, and was escorted to safety by security, while a few of the protesters were detained by police. Despite previous death threats, this was the first act of violence against Vilks.

A few days later, on 15 May 2010, Vilks' house in southern Sweden was attacked by arsonists. They smashed the windows and threw in bottles of gasoline. There was a small fire, but the house was not burned to the ground. Vilks was not at home at the time of the attack. Two Kosovar-Swedish brothers were arrested, and on 15 July they were sentenced to two and three years, respectively, of imprisonment.

On 24 November 2010, a video produced by the Somali Islamic terrorist organization Al-Shaabab was sent out. In the video, a Swedish speaking voice appeals to "all the Somali brothers and sisters" in Sweden, to leave that country and come to Somalia to fight for Al-Shabaab. He announced a death threat against Vilks. On 11 December 2010, a suicide bomber in Stockholm said in a message to media and the Swedish Security Police that "Now will your children, daughters and sisters die the same way our brothers and sisters die. Our actions will speak for themselves. As long as you don't end your war against Islam and degradation against the prophet and your foolish support for the pig Vilks."

=== Al-Qaeda hit list ===
In 2010 Anwar al-Awlaki published an Al-Qaeda hit list in Inspire magazine which included Vilks. In 2013, the list was expanded to include Stéphane "Charb" Charbonnier, who the Lars Vilks committee awarded their freedom prize to in 2014. When Charb was murdered in a terror attack on Charlie Hebdo in Paris, along with 11 other people, Al-Qaeda called for more cartoonists to be killed, The French cartoonist Stephane Charbonnier, killed in the Charlie Hebdo attack in Paris, was on the same hit list and Vilks stepped up his security. Following the Charlie Hebdo attack, Vilks said that fewer organizations were inviting him to give lectures amid increased security concerns.

=== 14 February 2015 attack ===
At an event called Art, blasphemy and the freedom of expression, which was organized by Vilks at the Krudttønden café in Copenhagen, Denmark, on 14 February 2015, an attack by a Muslim extremist with semi automatic gunfire, as a result of Vilks' drawings, left film director Finn Nørgaard dead and three police officers wounded. At least 30 bullet holes were visible in the window of the café. Participants at the event included speaker Niels Ivar Larsen and organizer Helle Merete Brix, the latter described the attack as having been targeted at Vilks. Ukrainian FEMEN organizer Inna Shevchenko and the French ambassador Francois Zimeray also were present at the event. The suspect, acting alone, fled the scene and attacked a synagogue, killing a man. He was then identified by surveillance cameras and killed in gunfire with police the following day. Police believe the attack in Copenhagen may have been inspired by the Charlie Hebdo shooting.

After the attack, Vilks went into hiding.

=== Free speech award ===
In March 2015, Vilks received the Sappho Award from the Danish Free Press Society. The award ceremony took place under tight security in the Parliament wing of Christiansborg Palace. It was Vilks's first public appearance since the 2015 February attack.

== Death ==
Vilks died in a car crash on 3 October 2021, in Markaryd, Sweden. He had been to Stocksund to have dinner with his friend, journalist Stina Lundberg Dabrowski. He was on his way home travelling in an unmarked police car with two police officers, at the time their car crashed into a large truck and caught fire. The two police officers from the South Region bodyguard group also died.

== Bibliography ==
- (1987) Konst och konster (in Swedish; dissertation), Malmö: Wedgepress & Cheese, ISBN 91-85752-57-6.
- (1993) Att läsa Arx (in Swedish), Nora: Nya Doxa, ISBN 91-88248-43-7.
- (1993) Arx : en bok om det outsägliga (in Swedish), Nora: Nya Doxa, ISBN 91-88248-47-X.
- (1994) Nimis och Arx (in Swedish), Nora: Nya Doxa, ISBN 91-88248-50-X.
- (1995) Konstteori : kameler går på vatten (in Swedish), Nora: Nya Doxa, ISBN 91-88248-94-1.
- (1999) Det konstnärliga uppdraget? : en historia om konsthistoria, kontextkonst och det metafysiska överskottet (in Swedish), Nora: Nya Doxa, ISBN 91-578-0331-5.
- (2002) T.O.A. : [teori om allting] (in Swedish), Malmö: Galleri 21, ISBN 91-631-2330-4.
- (2003) Myndigheterna som konstnärligt material : den långa historien om Nimis, Arx, Omfalos och Ladonien (in Swedish), Nora: Nya Doxa, ISBN 91-578-0429-X (hardback).
- (2004) Spartips : 34 tips för konstnärer, kommuner, vissa obemedlade samt underbetalda (in Swedish), Nora: Nya Doxa, ISBN 91-578-0451-6.
- (2005) Hur man blir samtidskonstnär på tre dagar : handbok med teori (in Swedish; co-author: Martin Schibli), Nora: Nya Doxa, ISBN 91-578-0459-1.
- (2011) ART: den institutionella konstteorin, konstnärlig kvalitet, den internationella samtidskonsten. Nora: Nya Doxa, ISBN 978-91-578-0590-4

== See also ==
- Jyllands-Posten Muhammad cartoons controversy
- Kurt Westergaard
- Theo van Gogh
