= Al-Faruq Mosque (Denmark) =

Mosque in Nørrebro, Denmark

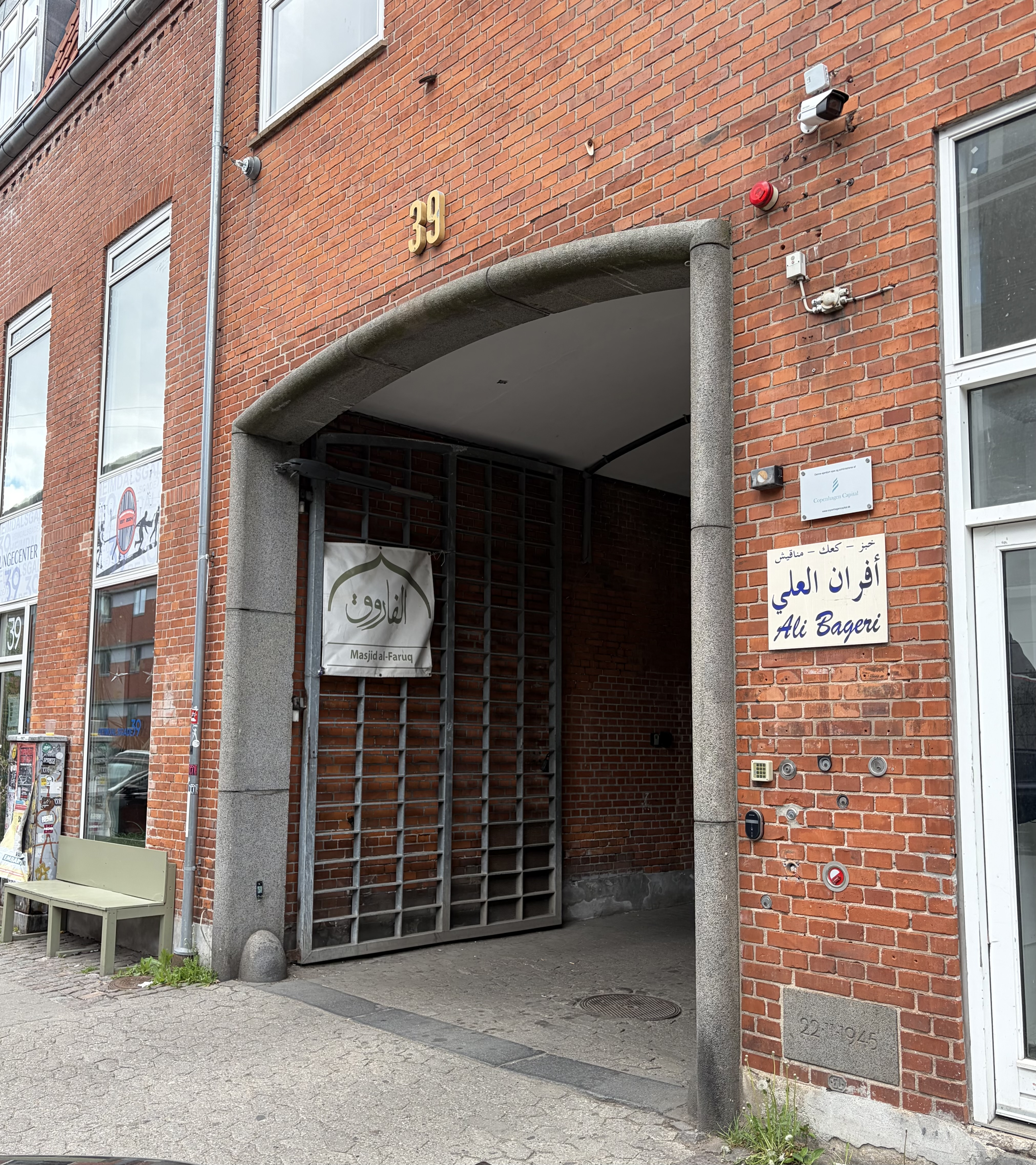
- The entrance to the Masjid al-Faruq in Heimdalsgade

- Location of the mosque in Copenhagen

Religion
- Affiliation: Sunni Islam
- Ecclesiastical or organizational status: Mosque
- Leadership: Mundhir Abdallah (imam)
- Status: Active

Location
- Location: Nørrebro, Copenhagen
- Country: Denmark
- Interactive map of Al-Faruq Mosque
- Coordinates: 55°42′11″N 12°32′40″E

Architecture
- Type: Mosque

The Al-Faruq Mosque, also known as the Masjid al-Faruq, is a mosque located in Nørrebro, Copenhagen, Denmark. The relatively obscure mosque became a centre of controversy between 2017 and 2019 due to its association with Hizb ut-Tahrir, an international pan-Islamist and Islamic fundamentalist political organization.

== Controversies ==
=== Connection with the 2015 Copenhagen shootings ===
Omar el-Hussein attended the mosque the day before perpetrating the 2015 Copenhagen shootings. The sermon that day included references to Muhammed waging war against Jews, and accused Western civilization of leading non-Muslims to corruption.

=== Antisemitism ===
Imam Mundhir Abdallah, a member of Hizb ut-Tahrir, delivered a sermon in March 2017 that included the following statement:

Doomsday will not come before the Muslims fight the Jews, such that the Muslims kill them, and the Jew will hide behind rock and trees, and the rock and the trees will say: "O muslim, O worshipper of God, there is a Jew behind me, so come and kill him".

— Mundhir Abdallah

In July 2018 Abdallah was charged with §266(b) and §136 part 3 of the penal code (respectively nicknamed racismeparagraffen and forkynderloven), the latter of which prohibits religious teachers from including express approval of certain crimes, including manslaughter, in religious instruction. The defense argued that Abdallah should be acquitted because the sermon was based on a Hadithic quote, because it was meant to refer to Israel rather than Jews in general, and because it was meant as a "prophecy" rather than an encouragement. Abdallah was found guilty on both charges.

On 21 June 2019, Abdallah stated in a sermon that the rulers and heads of state of Muslim countries, such as Iran, UAE, and Saudi Arabia, were serving crusader countries (United States), and that Jerusalem was occupied by Zionists.

=== Proposal to close the mosque ===
On 4 October 2018, six politicians from the Danish People's Party proposed to outlaw the mosque, but the motion did not carry. In December 2018, Minister of Justice Søren Pape Poulsen reported that the Ministry of Justice did not find a basis for this action in the constitution:

If an opportunity appears to dissolve the underlying union within the framework of the constitution, we should pursue that opportunity. But the Ministry of Justice has not deemed that this is possible

— Søren Pape Poulsen

== See also ==
- Islam in Denmark
- List of mosques in Denmark
