= Medbridge =

MedBridge
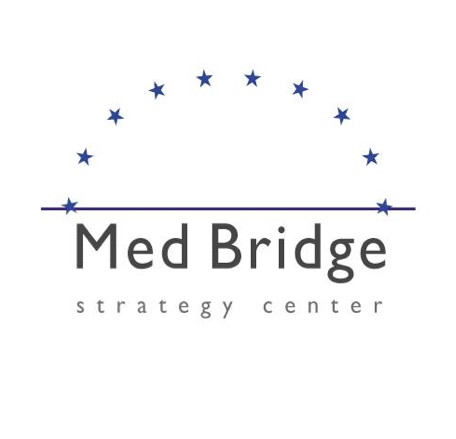
- Founded: 2003 (Belgium), 2004 (France)
- Type: Non-profit; NGO
- Location: Paris
- Services: Conferences, seminars, visits, exhibitions
- Fields: Promoting dialogue and mutual understanding between Europe and the Middle East
- Key people: Willy De Clercq, Marco Pannella, Ana Palacio, François Léotard, François Zimeray

MedBridge is a European organization whose goal is to promote dialogue and mutual understanding between Europe and the Middle East. Its aim is to enable Europeans willing to be informed on the Middle East or to support Israeli-Arab peace efforts, to access the most direct, comprehensive and objective information possible on the political situation in the region.

== History ==
Medbridge was created in 2003. It has been registered as a French non-profit organization since 2004. The organization was created by European leaders from different political backgrounds, such as Willy De Clercq, Marco Pannella, Ana Palacio, François Léotard and François Zimeray.

According to Israeli diplomat Yigal Palmor, the organization gathered in October 2003, and was the largest European parliamentary delegation that has ever visited the Middle East. 160 parliamentarians from 28 countries took part in the visit. In January 2008, the delegation accompanied another large delegation of 60 parliamentarians from 21 European countries. King Abdullah II was consulted by a delegation of Medbridge during this visit, and actively lobbied for the creation of a state of Palestine.

In February 2007, after French president Jacques Chirac told the press that if Iran held a few nuclear weapons, it wouldn't be a big deal, a delegation of French politicians was sent by Mebridge to Israel and Palestine to get a hands-on approach of the problem instead of viewing the conflict through the lens of the French press. In June 2007, MedBridge organized a visit of French writers to the Middle East in cooperation with Le Monde Magazine.

== Activities ==
Since its creation in 2003, the organization has initiated a dozen international events. These include conferences, exhibitions, international meetings and visits of European parliamentarians and civil society representatives to the Middle East.

=== Visits to the Middle East ===
Medbridge has organized visits to the Middle East for public leaders and decision-makers. About 500 parliamentarians, from 30 European countries, took part in these visits.

In addition to political visits, MedBridge has also initiated several visits for civil society representatives and opinion leaders.

=== Events ===
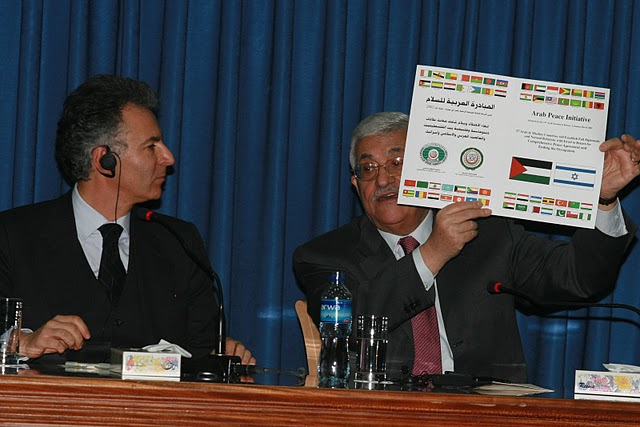
Mahmoud Abbas and François Zimeray during Parliaments for Peace in 2008

Medbridge has organized several conferences. In the past important leaders such as Ehud Barak, Édith Cresson, Claude Goasguen, Antoine Sfeir, or Alexandre Adler took part in these.

MedBridge has also organized exhibitions, among others at the French Senate.

In 2005, MedBridge, in cooperation with the organization Hommes de Paroles, organized the first World Congress of Imams and Rabbis for Peace, gathering 100 imams and rabbis from all over the world under the patronage of Albert II of Belgium and Mohammed VI of Morocco.

== People involved ==
Among the people who have received the delegations of MedBridge are:

- Abdallah II of Jordan
- Rania of Jordan
- Mahmoud Abbas
- Salam Fayyad
- Benyamin Netanyahu
- Shimon Peres
- Marwan al-Muasher
- Ahmed Aboul Gheit
- Ahmed Qurei
- Ariel Sharon
- Ehud Olmert
- Sari Nusseibeh
- Ahmed Tibi
- Reuven Rivlin
- Yasser Abd Rabbo
- Hanan Ashrawi
- Tzipi Livni
- Dalia Itzik
- Ami Ayalon
- Yossi Beilin
- Shaul Mofaz
- Amir Peretz
- Tomy Lapid
- Binyamin Ben-Eliezer
- Avraham Burg
- Avi Dichter
- Marc Otte
- David Grossman

Among the people who have taken part in the delegations are:

- François Fillon
- Robert Hue
- Jean-Marie Bockel
- Laurent Fabius
- Florian Zeller
- Eric Woerth
- Laurent Wauquiez
- Vytautas Landsbergis
- François-Xavier de Donnea
- Pierre Lellouche
- Christine Defraigne
- Jean Bardet
- Joëlle Garriaud-Maylam
- David Assouline
- Inese Vaidere
- Jean-Pierre Plancade
- Yvon Collin
- Michel Bécot
- Jean Arthuis
- Didier Boulaud
- Thierry Repentin
- Élisabeth Lamure
- Roland Ries
- François Marc
- Jean Gaubert
- Claude Bartolone
- Christophe Bouillon
- Pierre Forgues
- Igor Gräzin
- Boris Tsilevitch
- Sergey Dolgopolov
- João Soares
- Gustav Blix
- David Steel
- Baron Kilclooney
- Miroslav Mikolasik
