= Ana Palacio =

Spanish politician

The Most Excellent Ana Palacio
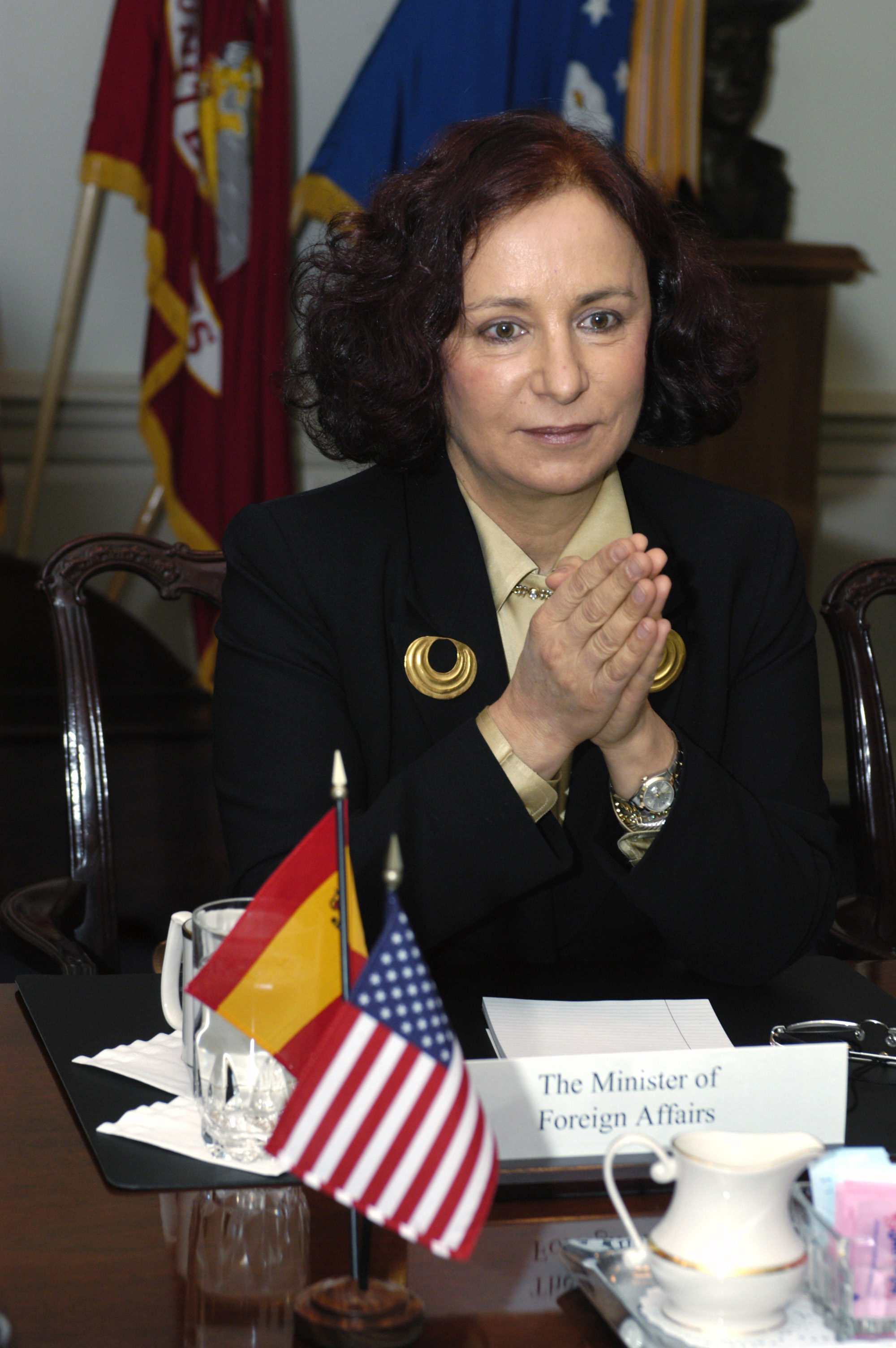
- Palacio in 2004

Minister of Foreign Affairs
- In office July 20, 2002 – April 18, 2004
- Monarch: Juan Carlos I
- Prime Minister: José María Aznar López
- Preceded by: Josep Piqué
- Succeeded by: Miguel Ángel Moratinos Cuyaubé

Member of the Congress of Deputies
- In office 14 March 2004 – 28 August 2006
- Succeeded by: Vicente Tirado
- Constituency: Toledo

Personal details
- Born: Ana Isabel de Palacio y del Valle Lersundi; 22 July 1948 (age 77) Madrid, Francoist Spain
- Party: People's Party

Ana Isabel de Palacio y del Valle Lersundi (born 22 July 1948) is Spain's former minister for foreign affairs in the People's Party (PP) government of José María Aznar from July 2002 to March 2004. Before this she was a lawyer in Madrid and then a Member of the European Parliament from 1994 to 2002. In March 2012, she was appointed an elective member of the Spanish Council of State. She currently is the founding partner of Palacio y Asociados, a Madrid-based consulting and law firm, and a senior strategic counsel at Albright Stonebridge Group, a global business strategy firm. She is in the daughter of Luis María de Palacio y de Palacio, 4th Marqués de Matonte, and his wife Luisa Mariana del Valle Lersundi y del Valle.

== Early life and education ==
Palacio graduated from the Lycée Français (Baccalauréat on Mathematics) with honors granted by the French Government to “the best foreign student who finished studies that year”. She holds degrees in law, and political science and sociology; her performance in her degree studies merited the Award for Academic Achievement (Premio Extraordinario Fin de Carrera).

== Legal career ==
As a lawyer, Palacio has held the most senior positions in the governing bodies of the Madrid Bar, as well as the European Bar (CCBE). She is an honorary member of the bar of England and Wales. She also served as a member of the board of trustees and former executive president of the Academy of European Law (ERA); and distinguished professor of the European College in Parma. She has worked as a practicing lawyer specializing in EU internal market law.

== Political career ==
=== Member of the European Parliament, 1994–2002 ===
Palacio spent eight years (1994–2002) with the European Parliament, where she chaired the Committee on Legal Affairs and Internal Market and the Committee on Justice and Home Affairs, and was elected by her peers to chair in two half legislatures the Conference of Committee Chairmen, the Parliament's most senior body for the coordination of its legislative work. Inspired by legal legitimacy as the mark of identity of the EU, her main addresses and reports have pinpointed the legislation on internal market as well as the security area, especially focused on justice and home affairs and human rights.

From 1995 until 1999, Palacio also served on the committee on the Rules of Procedure, the Verification of Credentials and Immunities. In addition to her committee assignments, she was a member of the parliament's Delegation for relations with the Palestinian Legislative Council from 1999 until 2002.

=== Minister of Foreign Affairs, 2002–2004 ===
As part of a cabinet reshuffle, Prime Minister José María Aznar appointed Palacio as foreign minister, replacing Josep Piqué. She was the first woman to serve as Spain's foreign minister and, at the time, held the most senior post ever filled by a woman in the Spanish government.

During her time in office, Spain and Morocco formally ended their 2002 military standoff over the uninhabited islet of Perejil, or Leila, and agreed to improve the highly charged relations between the two countries.

Prior to her appointment to the World Bank, she served as member of the Spanish Parliament, representing Toledo, (Madelein Albright, congress woman, has an English version of 'Alvarez de Toledo' surname) where she chaired the Joint Committee of the two Houses for European Union Affairs. As Prime Minister Aznar's representative to the European Convention and the convention's Presidium, Palacio was at the forefront of the debate on the future of the European Union and actively participated in the drafting and legal discussions pertaining the reform of the treaties governing the European Union.

=== Career at the UN ===
Palacio served on the UN High Level Commission on the Legal Empowerment of the Poor between 2005 and 2006.

World Bank President Paul Wolfowitz announced on 19 June 2006 Palacio's appointment as senior vice-president and general counsel of the World Bank effective August 28, 2006. One of her primary duties, as general counsel, involved Palacio's serving as secretary general of the International Centre for Settlement of Investment Disputes, which is the division of the World Bank responsible for administrating arbitrations and conciliation between individuals and states under investment protection treaties, concession agreements and other foreign investment protection instruments, including certain national investment laws.

== Other activities ==
Since 2010, Palacio has been the founding partner of Palacio y Asociados, a Madrid-based consulting and law firm, and also serving as a senior strategic counsel for Albright Stonebridge Group, an international strategic consulting firm. She has been visiting professor of the Edmund A. Walsh School of Foreign Service at Georgetown University since 2014.

Since 2011, Palacio has written monthly comments on global strategy for international media organization Project Syndicate.

In addition, she currently holds various paid and unpaid positions.

=== Corporate boards ===
- Enagás, lead independent coordinating director on the board of directors
- PharmaMar, member of the board of directors
- Investcorp, member of the international advisory board
- Anadarko, member of the international advisory board
- Areva, member of the executive board (2008–2009)

=== Non-profit organizations ===
- Atlantic Council, member of the board of directors
- Council on Foreign Relations, member of the international advisory board
- Carnegie Corporation of New York, member of the board of trustees
- Elcano Royal Institute, member of the scientific council
- European Council on Foreign Relations (ECFR), member
- European Leadership Network (ELN), Senior Network member, member of the Task Force on Cooperation in Greater Europe
- Global Leadership Foundation (GLF), member
- Institut Montaigne, member of the advisory board
- Migration Policy Institute (MPI), member of the Transatlantic Council on Migration
- New Pact for Europe, member of the advisory group
- Aspen Institute Italia, member of the advisory board
- Instituto de Empresa (IE), member of the advisory board
- University of Texas MD Anderson Cancer Center, member of the board of trustees
- Le Conseil d’Orientation et de Réflexion de l’Assurance (CORA), member
- Fundación para el Análisis y los Estudios Sociales (FAES), member of the advisory board
- Foundation pour l’Innovation Politique, member of the advisory board
- Fundación para las Relaciones Internacionales (FRIDE), member of the advisory board
- CSIS Initiative for a Renewed Transatlantic Partnership, member of the advisory board
- The American Interest, member of the global advisory council
- Revue de Droit de l’Union européenne, member of the global advisory council
- World Justice Project, honorary co-chair
- Prague European Summit, advisory board member

In 2003, Palacio created together with other prominent European personalities the Medbridge Strategy Center, whose goal is to promote dialogue and mutual understanding between Europe and the Middle-East.

== Recognition ==
In January 2004 Palacio was listed among The Wall Street Journal’s 75 ‘global opinion leaders’. In October 2001 the same newspaper, under the heading "Europe’s Lawyer", published an extensive feature article on her in its supplement on "12 influential players on the world business stage". Among the awards and decorations she has been bestowed upon, she is the recipient of the 2004 American Jewish Committee Ramer Award for Diplomatic Excellence, which recognizes her role in upholding democracy and the values of open society.

In 2016, Palacio was awarded the Sandra Day O’Connor Justice Prize.

== Personal life ==
In December 2000, Palacio was diagnosed with cancer. She refused to wear a wig or a hat when the chemotherapy made her hair fall out. Her sister, Loyola de Palacio, was a minister in the Spanish government from 1996 to 1998, and a member of the European Commission from 1999 to 2004; she died of a fulminant hepatitis while receiving therapy for cancer in Madrid 'Doce de Octubre' hospital, in 2006.

Political offices
Preceded by Josep Piqué	Minister of Foreign Affairs; 9 July 2002 –17 April 2004	Succeeded by Miguel Ángel Moratinos as Minister of Foreign Affairs and Cooperation
