= Danish Voksenuddannelsescenter (VUC) =

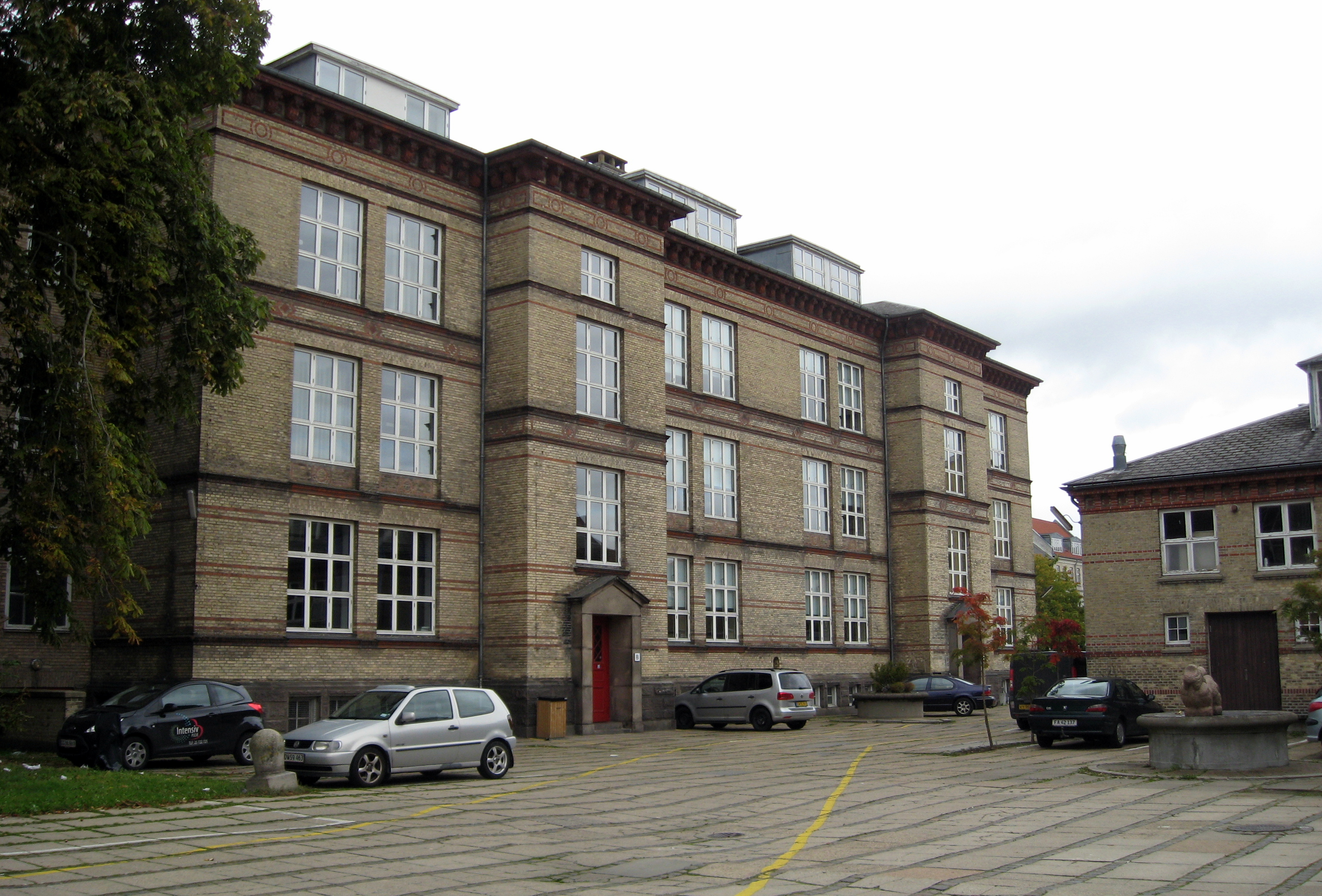
VUC in Aalborg

The Danish Voksenuddannelsescentre (VUC, lit. 'Adult Education Center') is the general adult education programme which is part of the public education system in Denmark. There are 29 adult education centres (VUCs) in Denmark.

== History ==
Since January 2007, VUC's have been self-governing institutions, where teaching is financed by the Danish state via a taximeter funding.

== Teaching and subjects ==
The teaching of the General Adult Education Programme is based on a single-subject structure. The subjects can be pieced together according to the individual's own requirements and needs. It is possible to study one or more subjects at the same time.

Each VUC offers the following courses: Danish, Danish as a second language, English, French, German, history, mathematics, and science and social studies. VUC may also choose to provide a number of other courses, including: arts, basic information technology (IT), cooperation and communication, Latin, philosophy, physical education and sport, psychology, and public speaking.

Some VUCs also provide Education for people with reading and writing disabilities (including dyslexia), preparatory education for adults (FVU), higher preparatory exam courses (HF), and supplementary examination courses at upper secondary level (GS).

== Exams and certificates ==
Two different types of exams may be taken at these courses: the General Preparatory Examination and the Gymnasium Examination. Students who pas the General Preparatory Examination or who take an exam in a single subject may be awarded a certificate equivalent to the School Leaving Examination. Students who to not sit exams may also be awarded a certificate of attendance.

The Gymnasium Examination qualifies a student for the two-year Higher Preparatory Examination courses taken at a gymnasium. Students looking for that qualification must take tests in 5 subjects: Danish (or Danish as a second language), English, mathematics, and two elective courses. To pass, they must achieve at least a 2 on the 7-point scale.
