= Sooreh Hera =

Iranian artist and photographer (born 1973)

Sooreh Hera (born 1973) is an Iranian artist and photographer. "Sooreh Hera" is a pseudonym the artist chose for herself. Hera's work, often featuring depictions of the Islamic prophet Muhammad, have been considered expressions of free speech to some and offensive Islamophobia to others. She is currently based in the Netherlands.

== Biography ==
Hera was born in Tehran. She is a graduate of the Hague School of Fine Art.

In December 2007, the Islamic Democratic Party "issued a statement calling for a mobilizing of forces." In addition, she was called a "devil artist" with "plans against Islam." These led to death threats against Hera, causing her to go into hiding. She also has a fatwa issued against her.

== Work ==
Hera describes her work as exposing hypocrisy in the teachings of Islam about issues like homosexuality. She feels that it is important to talk about sexuality in order to criticize religion. Hera states that "in countries like Iran or Saudi Arabia it is common for married men to maintain relations with other men." She says that "I'm hoping my work will arouse discussion." One of her censored works, "Adam and Ewald," was a photograph of gay men wearing masks depicting Mohammed and his son-in-law, Ali. "Adam and Ewald" is part of a series called Adam & Ewald, de zevendedagsgeliefden (Adam & Ewald, Seventh-Day Lovers). The title of the series references the story of Adam and Eve, and also refers to a speech from a conservative Christian Dutch politician.

Some museums who have attempted to show Hera's work have been threatened by those who find her work offensive. In November 2007, the Hague Gemeentemuseum removed some of the works created by Hera in order to avoid upsetting the Muslim community. The censoring of her art marked "the first time that a Dutch museum, as opposed to a government body, has censored an artwork from its own walls." The museum director also accused Hera of deliberately creating provocative work in order to receive press attention. Despite that, the museum still considered purchasing her complete series. Hera chose not to participate in the show if some of her work was censored. Artists in the Netherlands supported Hera, publishing an open letter to the Dutch Minister of Culture in the NRC Handelsblad. Hera's work was invited to be shown at the Municipal Museum of Gouda, though the show was postponed due to threats from the Muslim community of Gouda.
