= Finn Nørgaard =

Danish filmmaker (1959–2015)

- Born: 27 May 1959; Denmark
- Died: 14 February 2015 (aged 55); Østerbro, Copenhagen, Denmark
- Education: cand.phil., University of Copenhagen, 1991
- Occupation: Filmmaker
- Years active: 1983–2015

Finn Nørgaard (27 May 1959 – 14 February 2015) was a Danish filmmaker who was involved in several documentary and feature films.

== Education ==
Nørgaard received a cand.phil. degree in Film and Communication from the University of Copenhagen in 1991.

== Career ==
Nørgaard was a photographer for the 1983 Danish detective film Adam Hart i Sahara and editor of the 1986 Danish documentary film Soul to soul. He served as producer for Kun for forrykte, a 1988 documentary film about Eik Skaløe and Steppeulvene. He worked behind the camera as clapper loader in Peter Eszterhás' 1989 film En afgrund af frihed.

From 1989 until 2001 Nørgaard worked at DR (Danish Broadcasting Corporation). In 2001 he became co-owner of Filmselskabet (Film Company). During this period he is also credited as assistant camera in the 1992 German film Die Terroristen! and made an appearance as a bodyguard in Thomas Borch Nielsen's 1998 film Skyggen (Webmaster).

In 2004 he directed the documentary film Boomerang Drengen(Boomerang Boy) and was responsible for production of documentary films about the Lê Lê restaurant chain: Lê Lê - De jyske vietnamesere from 2008.

In 2009, for TV 2, Nørgaard directed and produced En anden vej: Historien om fire nydanskere og en koncernchef, which followed former Tryg-CEO Stine Bosse and four young immigrants to Denmark with a criminal background on a pilgrimage to El Camino.

Nørgaard also directed and produced film for Mærsk, SAS and Microsoft, among others.

== Death ==
Finn Nørgaard was killed on 14 February 2015 by a 22-year-old Danish-born Muslim of Palestinian descent during a discussion meeting titled "Art, Blasphemy, and Freedom of Expression" organized by the Lars Vilks Committee and held at the Krudttønden culture center in Østerbro. Finn Nørgaard was killed while trying to stop the perpetrator. The perpetrator shot him with an assault rifle from close range. In the same incident two PET bodyguards and a police officer were wounded.
