= Krudttønden =

Cultural centre and café in Denmark

Coordinates: 55.7053°N 12.5746°E

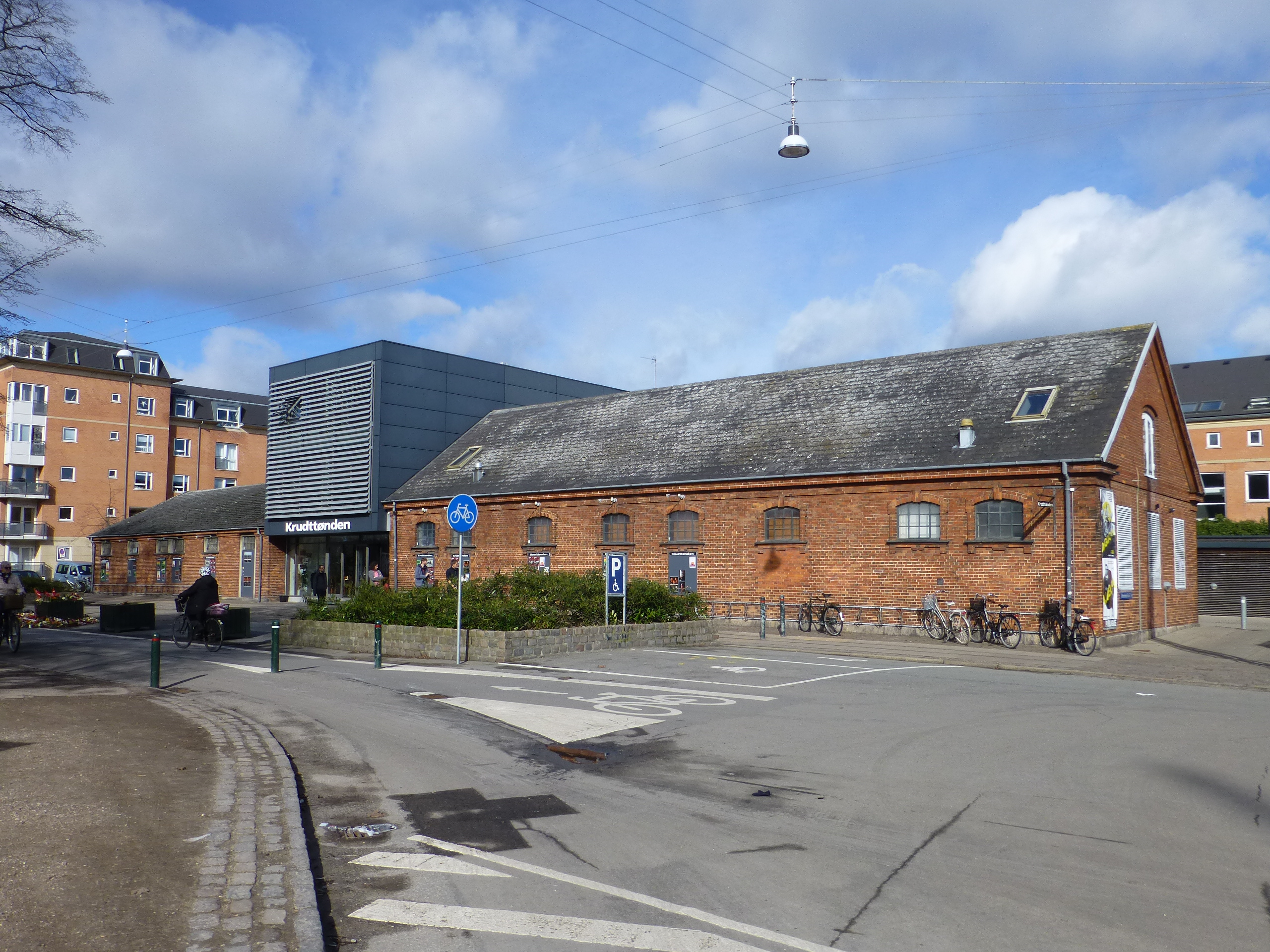

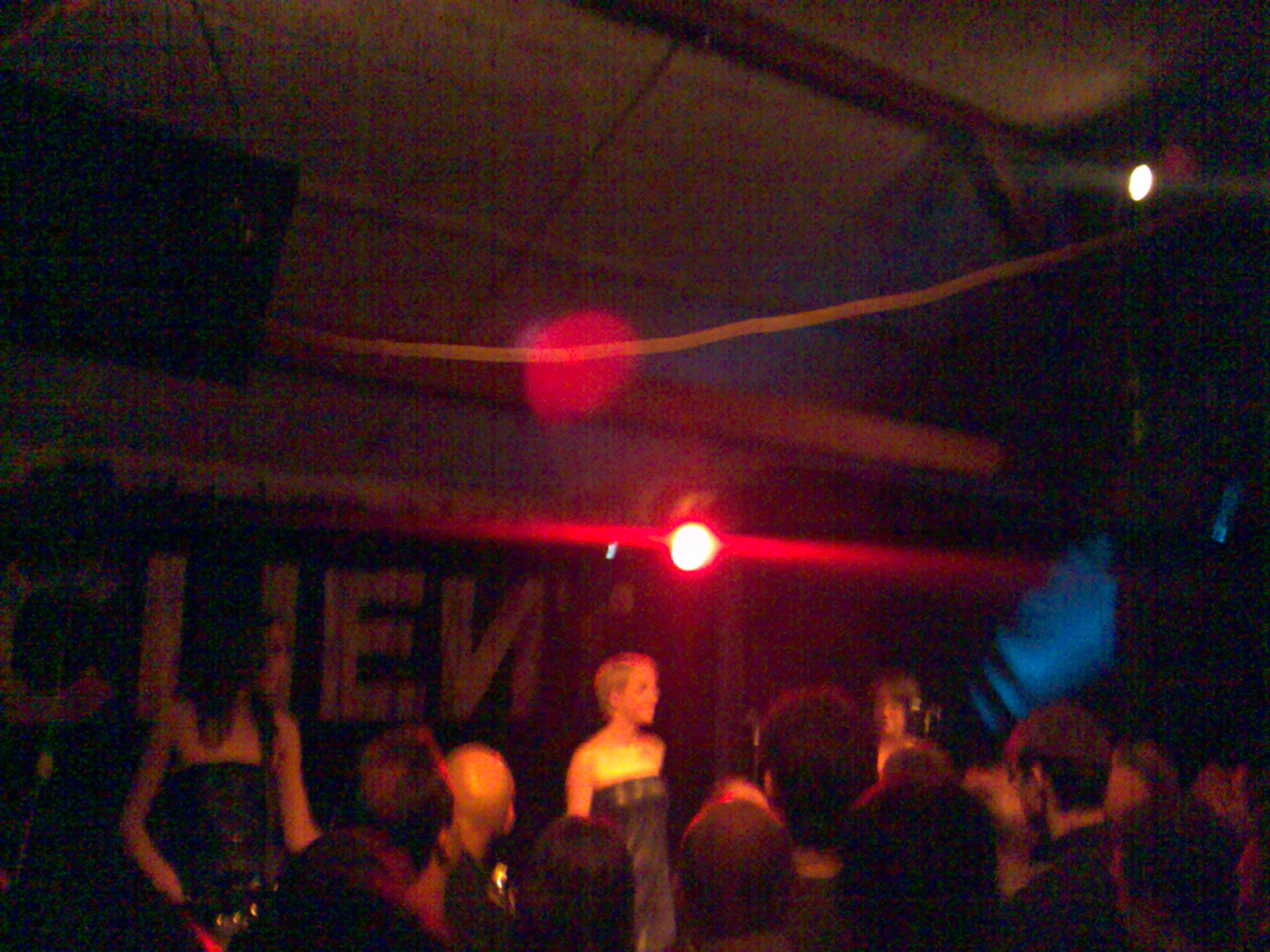
Interior of Krudttønden café in 2007, with Client performing.

Krudttønden (meaning "The powder keg") is a café and local cultural centre at Østerfælled Torv in the Østerbro district of Copenhagen, Denmark. Krudttønden is used for a wide array of cultural events, including theatre, concerts, debates, exhibitions and receptions.

== History ==
Krudttønden was established in connection with the redevelopment of the former Østerfælled Barracks into a mixed-use development. It was established in 1990 by the Municipality of Copenhagen at the request of local artists and volunteers. Originally the building consisted of stables, but it has later been expanded with a modern building.

== 2015 shooting ==
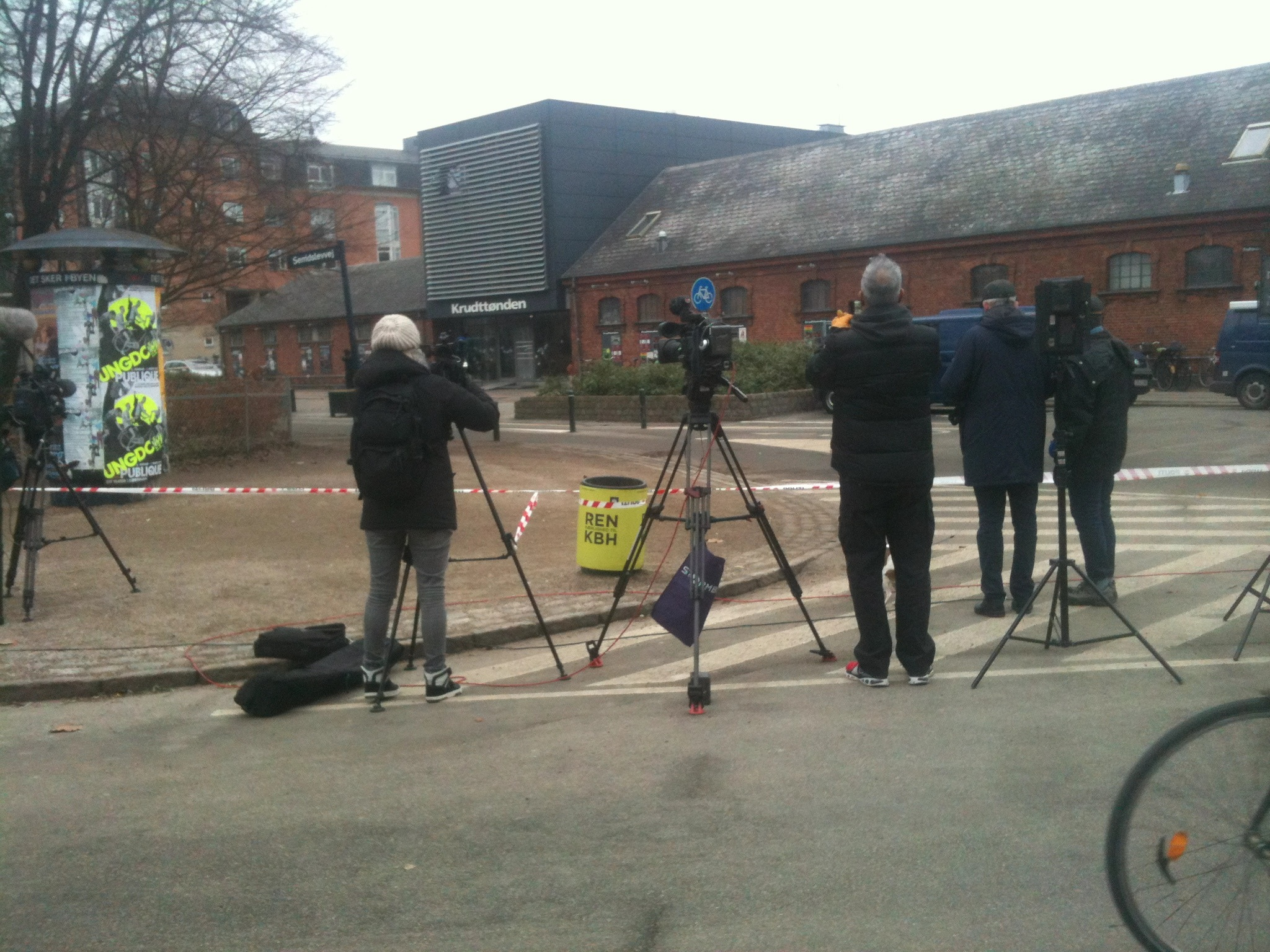
Krudttønden after the attack, 2015.

On 14 February 2015, the cafe was the site of a shooting attack that killed the 55-year-old film director Finn Nørgaard and wounded three police officers.
