= Fu =

Fu or FU may refer to:

== In arts and entertainment ==
- Fool Us, Penn & Teller's magic-competition television show
- Fǔ, a type of ancient Chinese vessel
- Fu (poetry) (赋), a Chinese genre of rhymed prose
- FU: Friendship Unlimited, a 2017 Marathi film
- Fu Dog, a character on the Disney animated television series American Dragon: Jake Long
- Fu Manchu, a fictional character first featured in a series of novels by English author Sax Rohmer
- Shaq Fu, video game
- Francis Urquhart, the main character in the novel House of Cards by Michael Dobbs, and in the UK television series

=== In music ===
- The F.U.'s, an American band
- F.U. Don't Take It Personal, an album by American hip hop group Fu-Schnickens
- F.U.E.P., an EP by Lily Allen
- "FU" (song), a song by Miley Cyrus from her album Bangerz
- F.U. EP, a 2002 EP by Gob
- "F.U.", a song by Little Mix from their 2016 album Glory Days
- "F-U", a song by Yo Gotti from his 2013 album I Am
- "F.U.", a song by Avril Lavigne from her seventh studio album Love Sux

== In language ==
- Fu (character) (福), meaning "prosperity", "fortune", "good luck", "blessing", or "happiness" in Chinese
- Fu (kana) (ふ, フ), a symbol in Japanese syllabaries

== Places ==
- Fu (administrative division) (府), an administrative division used in Japan, and previously in China, Korea and Vietnam
- Fu, Nepal
- Fu County, in Shaanxi, China
- Fu River (disambiguation), the name of several rivers in China (Fuhe, Fujiang, Fushui)
- Fu, Sweden, a village in Sweden.

== Schools and universities ==
=== In the United States ===
- Fu Foundation School of Engineering and Applied Science, a.k.a. the Columbia School of Engineering and Applied Science, New York
- Fairfield University, Fairfield, Connecticut
- Finlandia University, Hancock, Michigan
- Fordham University, New York
- Franklin University, Ohio
- Rosalind Franklin University of Medicine and Science, North Chicago, Illinois
- Friends University, Wichita, Kansas
- Furman University, a University in Greenville, South Carolina

=== In other countries ===
- FATA University, Akhorwal, Darra Adam Khel, FR Kohat, FATA, Pakistan
- Free University of Berlin, Germany
- Fuzhou University, Fuzhou, Fujian, China
- Simon Fraser University, Vancouver, Canada, formerly known as Fraser University (FU)

== In science and technology ==
- Vought FU, an American 1920s fighter aircraft
- Fixture unit, equal to a flow of one cubic foot of water per minute
- Formula unit, in chemistry
- Functional unit (execution unit), part of a CPU that performs the operations and calculations

== Other uses ==
- Fuzhou Airlines, a Chinese airline (IATA code FU)
- Fu (surname), a common pronunciation for some east Asian surnames, such as 傅, 符, 付, 扶, 伏, 福, 富, and ふ
- Fu (tally) (符), a Chinese tally (memory aid device) made of bamboo, wood, or metal
- Fulu, a Taoist paper spell
- Fu, a type of prepared wheat gluten in Japanese cuisine
- Fu Manchu moustache, a full mustache popularized by the fictional character
- Fu Lu Shou (福禄寿), the concept of Prosperity (Fu), Status (Lu), and Longevity (Shou) in Chinese culture
- FUTV, a Costa Rican television channel
- Marco Fu, Hong Kong snooker player
- Fed-Up Party, a joke political party during the Canadian federal election of 2011
- Fuck You (disambiguation), a profane phrase
- Follow-up (disambiguation)

== See also ==
- FUBAR
- Foobar
- Kung fu (term)
- Phoo
- Phu (disambiguation)
- Foo (disambiguation)
