= Foo (disambiguation) =

Foo is a placeholder name in computer-related documentation.

Foo or FOO may also refer to:

== People ==
- Adeline Foo, Singaporean writer
- Cedric Foo (born 1960), Singaporean politician
- Ching Ling Foo (1854–1922), Chinese magician
- Foo Choo Choon (1860–1921), Malaysian businessman
- Ernie Foo (1891–1934), Australian rules footballer
- Jon Foo (born 1982), English actor, martial artist and stuntman
- Jonathan Foo (born 1990), Guyanese cricketer
- Mark Foo (1958–1994), American surfer
- Parker Foo (born 1998), Chinese ice hockey player
- Ruby Foo (1904–1950), restaurateur
- Sharin Foo (born 1973), Danish musician
- Spencer Foo (born 1994), Chinese ice hockey player
- Stephanie Foo (born 1987), American radio producer

== Places ==
- Foo Lake, in Wisconsin, United States
- Foo Pass, in Switzerland

== Other uses ==
- Foo (game), a dice game
- Foo, a cloud enemy from New Super Mario Bros. Wii and New Super Mario Bros. U
- Foo?, an album by the band Porno Graffiti
- Foo Camp, a hacker event
- Foo gas or fougasse, a type of explosive mine
- Forward observation officer
- A nonsense word used in the Smokey Stover comic strip
- Foo fighter, mysterious aerial phenomena seen during World War II
- Foo was here, an Australian graffiti signature of popular culture
- First of October (FoO), an American-Canadian rock duo

== See also ==
- Foo Fighters, an American rock band
- FUBAR (disambiguation)
- Phoo Action
- Phu (disambiguation)
- Fu (disambiguation)
