= DFU =

DFU may refer to the following:

== Organizations ==
- Dansk Folkepartis Ungdom, the youth wing of the Danish People's Party

== Education ==
- Dartmouth Forensic Union, debate team of Dartmouth College

== Other ==
- Device Firmware Upgrade mechanism, for USB devices
- Diabetic foot ulcer
- Drain fixture unit, a unit of measure in plumbing
