= Phu Lam (disambiguation) =

Phu Lam (1961–2014) was the perpetrator of the 2014 Edmonton shooting.

Phu Lam may also refer to:

- Phú Lâm, Ho Chi Minh City, a neighborhood in Chợ Lớn, now part of District 6, Ho Chi Minh City. The name is also used for the substation of the 500kV transmission line, located on National Route 1, Bình Tân district not too far from the neighborhood
- Phú Lâm, An Giang, a rural commune and village of Phú Tân District, An Giang
- Phú Lâm, Đồng Nai, a rural commune and village of Tân Phú district, Đồng Nai

== See also ==
- Battle of Phu Lam Tao (23 March 1885), politically significant engagement during the Sino-French War
- Phu (disambiguation)
- Lam (disambiguation)
