= Danish People's Party =

Political party in Denmark

Danish People's Party Dansk Folkeparti
- Abbreviation: DF; O (Note: Official party letter on voting ballot)
- Leader: Morten Messerschmidt
- Parliamentary leader: Peter Kofod
- Founded: 6 October 1995
- Split from: Progress Party
- Headquarters: Christiansborg, 1240 Copenhagen
- Youth wing: Youth of the Danish People's Party
- Membership (2021): 9,427
- Ideology: Danish nationalism; National conservatism; Right-wing populism
- Political position: Right-wing to far-right
- European affiliation: Patriots.eu
- European Parliament group: Patriots for Europe (since 2024) (Note: The party was formerly part of the Union for Europe of the Nations (1999–2009), the Europe of Freedom and Democracy (2009–2014), European Conservatives and Reformists Group (2014–2019), and Identity and Democracy (2019–2024).)
- Nordic Council affiliation: Nordic Freedom
- Colours: Blue; Red (official); Yellow (customary)
- Folketing: 16 / 179 (Note: Only 175 of the 179 seats in the Danish Parliament, the Folketing, are obtainable by Danish political parties as Greenland and the Faroe Islands are assigned two seats each due to their status as territories in the Kingdom of Denmark.)
- European Parliament: 1 / 15
- Regional Councils: 11 / 205
- Municipal Councils: 152 / 2,436
- Mayors: 0 / 98

Election symbol

Website
- danskfolkeparti.dk

The Danish People's Party (DPP; Danish: Dansk Folkeparti, DF) is a nationalist and right-wing populist political party in Denmark. It was formed in 1995 by former members of the Progress Party (FrP). The party saw a period of significant growth after its founding and lent its support to the Venstre–Conservative People's Party coalition government that ruled from the 2001 Danish general election until the defeat in the 2011 Danish general election.

While not part of the cabinet, DF cooperated closely with the governing coalition on most issues and received support for key political stances in return, to the point that the government was commonly referred to as the "VKO-government" (O being DF's election symbol). It also provided parliamentary support to Lars Løkke Rasmussen's cabinets from 2016 to 2019, again without participating in it. In the 2014 European Parliament election in Denmark, DF secured 27% of the vote as part of the European Conservatives and Reformists group. This was followed by receiving 21% of the vote in the 2015 Danish general election, becoming the second largest party in Denmark for the first time.

From 2015 onward. the party saw a decline in support; it fell to third place and 10.8% of the vote in the 2019 European Parliament election, and to just 8.7% in the 2019 Danish general election, resulting in a loss of 21 seats and a return to opposition. The party later lost over half of its seats in the 2021 Danish local elections, losing 130 of the 221 it held before the election, achieving just 4.1% of the vote. Some commentators attributed the losses to internal conditions within the party and conflicts with the leadership, its perceived indecisiveness in government and rival parties adopting many of its policy ideas. The DF also suffered a number of defections during 2022 following the rise of the Denmark Democrats party, which many former DF members and supporters joined.

At the 2022 Danish general election. the party received its worst result ever, winning only five seats. As of February 2023, due to defections from Nye Borgerlige, DF had seven of the seats in the Danish Folketing. The party made significant gains at the 2026 Danish general election, with 9.1% of the vote and 16 seats.

== History ==
The party's popularity has grown since its inception, taking 25 seats in the 179-member Folketing in the 2007 parliamentary election (13.8% of the vote, remaining the third largest party in Denmark). In the 2011 parliamentary election, while maintaining its position as the third largest party, DF received 12.3% of the vote, marking its first electoral decline.

=== Kjærsgaard leadership (1995–2012) ===
==== Early years (1995–2001) ====
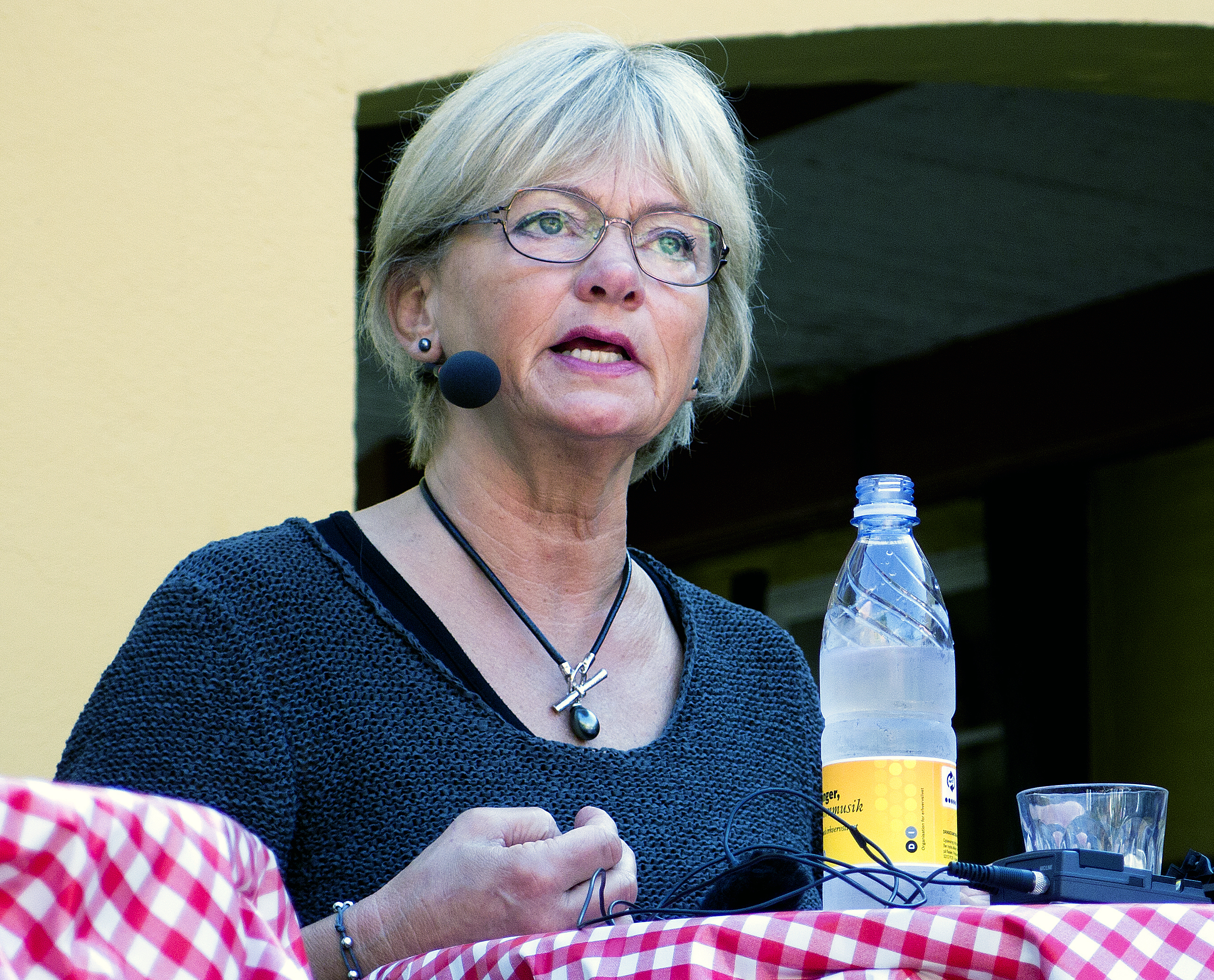
Pia Kjærsgaard, co-founder and chairman of the Danish People's Party from 1995 until 2012. Bornholm, 2011

The Danish People's Party was founded on 6 October 1995, after Pia Kjærsgaard and Kristian Thulesen Dahl broke away from the Progress Party. Its first national convention was held in Vissenbjerg on 1 June 1996, where Kjærsgaard was unanimously elected as the party's chairman. The party was established in protest over the "anarchistic conditions" of the Progress Party, and its "all or nothing" policies. It was initially seen by many as a "clone" of the Progress Party, but this soon proved false. In a struggle to be respected as a responsible party able to cooperate with others and distance it from the conditions in the Progress Party, the leadership of the party struck down criticism from its members by means of expulsions. The party saw a highly centralized party leadership as necessary, as it would not tolerate internal conflicts and disagreements with the official strategy.

The party was the first successful parliamentary party in the Nordic countries to relate philosophically more closely to the French Nouvelle Droite, than to the previous Nordic form of right-wing populism. DF represented a synthesis of several political currents: the Lutheran movement Tidehverv and its related journal, an intellectual nationalist right from the Danish Association (Den Danske Forening) and conservative populists from the Progress Party.

In 1997, the party won about 7% in the municipal elections, and did very well in traditional left-wing municipalities, potentially rivaling the Social Democrats. By 1998, the party had 2,500 registered members. The party made its electoral debut in the 1998 Danish parliamentary election, winning 13 seats and 7.4% of the vote. The party was, however, left with no influence in the formation of a government; it was shut out in large part due to the perception that it was not stuerent (i.e. not acceptable or "housebroken").

==== Venstre-Conservative coalitions (2001–2011) ====
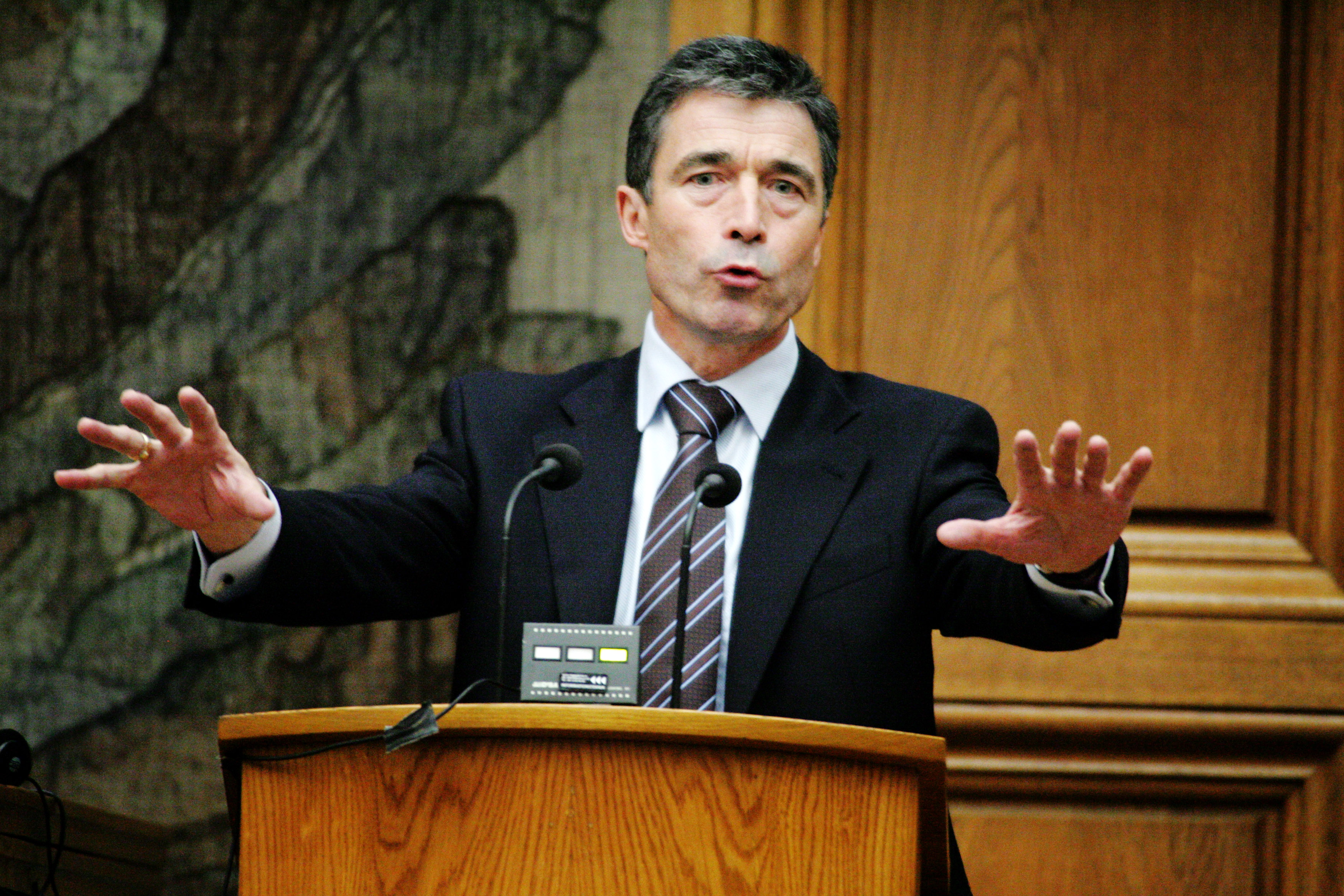
Danish prime minister Anders Fogh Rasmussen who in 2001 began giving the DF political concessions for supporting his governments. Copenhagen, 2006

In the 2001 election, the party won 12% of the vote and 22 seats in parliament. It became the third largest party in the parliament, giving them a key position, as they would have a parliamentary majority together with the Conservative People's Party and Venstre. DF was favoured by these parties, as it had supported the Venstre candidate for Prime Minister, Anders Fogh Rasmussen, during the election campaign. Eventually, it gave its parliamentary support for a Venstre-Conservative coalition government, headed by Prime Minister Rasmussen, in exchange for the implementation of some of their key demands, first and foremost stricter policies on immigration. The party had a key role in writing the rules and conditions for immigration in the immigration law that was established by the government in May 2002, which it called "Europe's strictest".

In the 2005 election, the party further increased their vote, and won 13.2% of the vote and 24 seats. With young first-time voters the party was even more popular, receiving one fifth of their votes. The party continued to support the government, and developed a broader policy base, as it made welfare policies its core issue, together with immigration policies. In 2006, the party's popularity rose dramatically in opinion polls following the Jyllands-Posten Muhammad cartoons controversy, at the expense of the Social Democrats. The average of all monthly national polls showed DF gaining seven seats in parliament from January to February, with the Social Democrats losing an equal number. This effect, however, somewhat waned with the falling media attention to the cartoons controversy.

In the 2007 parliamentary election, DF won 13.9% and 25 seats, and again continued to support the Conservative-Liberal government. Thus, in every election since its founding the party has had a steady growth, although the growth rate has stagnated somewhat in recent years. Parties in the political centre, particularly the newly founded New Alliance had sought to become the kingmaker and be able to isolate the immigration policies of DF, but eventually failed. The party was a member of the Movement for a Europe of Liberties and Democracy (MELD). In the 2009 elections for the European Parliament, the prime candidate for the party, Morten Messerschmidt, won his seat in a landslide with 284,500 personal votes (most votes for any single candidate by any party); this gave the party a second seat (which went to Anna Rosbach Andersen). The party made a breakthrough from its previous results in European elections, more than doubling its vote to 15.3%, and receiving 2 MEPs. On 15 September 2012, Kristian Thuesen Dahl succeeded Kjærsgaard as chairman.

=== Thulesen Dahl leadership (2012–2022) ===
During the 2015 election, the DF won 21.08% of the national vote under the leadership of Kristian Thulesen Dahl, the highest since its founding and gained 37 seats putting the party in second place. In the aftermath, the party entered negotiations with Venstre to again provide parliamentary support in return for stricter policies on immigration and the EU. A minority government headed by Lars Løkke Rasmussen was subsequently formed with the DF, the Liberal Alliance and the Conservative People's Party providing support.

The party suffered a major defeat in the 2019 election, recording its worst result since 1998. It won just 8.7% of the vote and 16 seats, a net loss of 21 seats since 2015; it fell to third place, just narrowly outpolling the Social Liberals. Some journalists and political commentators opined that the DF's loss in support was as a result of the party's refusal and indecisiveness on taking direct part in government and the main parties including the Social Democrats adopting many of the DF's policies on immigration and integration. In January 2022, Dahl stood down as leader and was replaced by Morten Messerschmidt in a leadership election where he won 499 out of the 828 delegators' votes against two other candidates. After Messerschmidt, a total of 11 out of 16 MPs had in June left the party including Thuelsen Dahl who was the only one of them who passed on his seat to the next in line.

=== Messerschmidt leadership (2022–present) ===
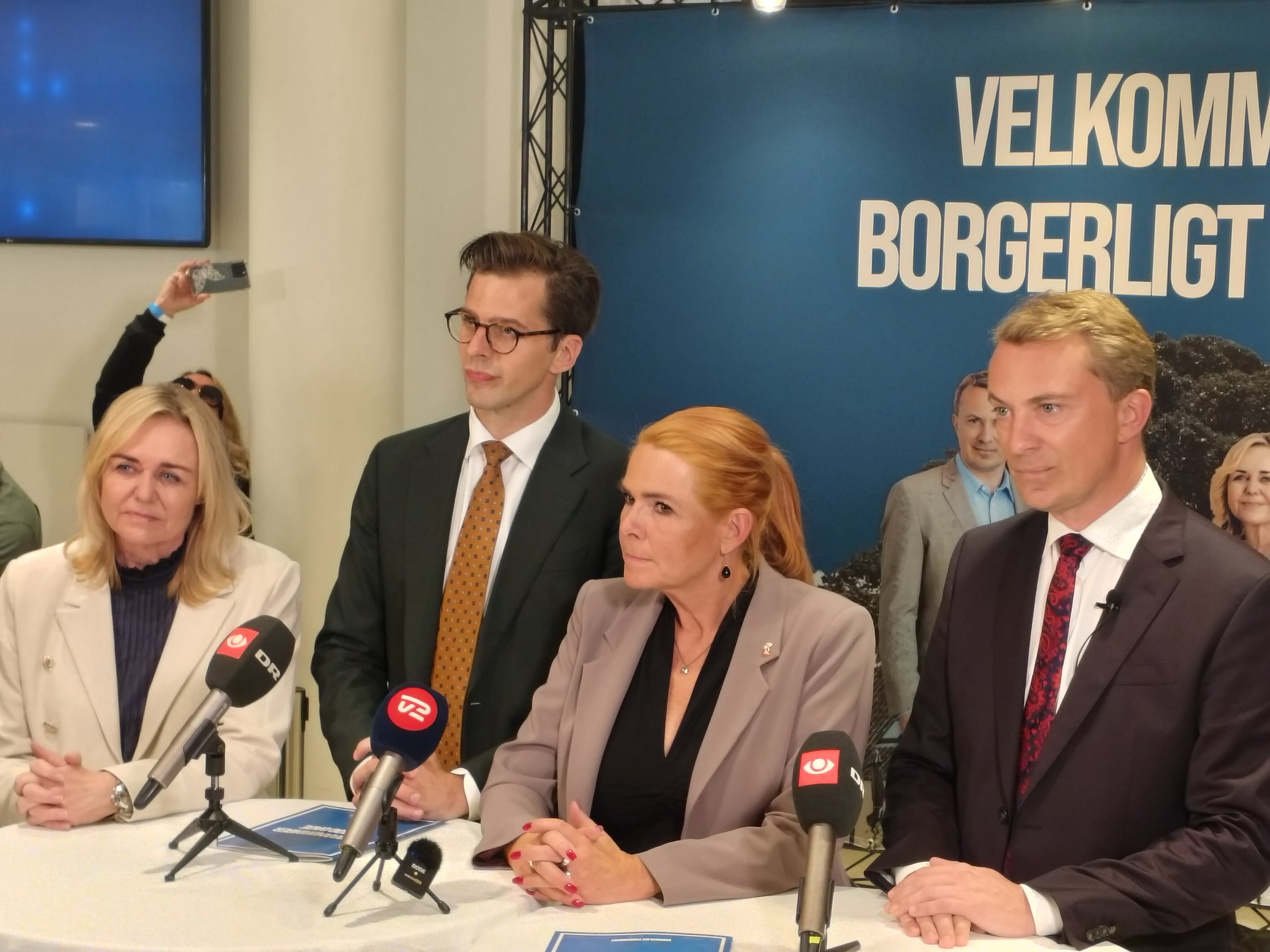
Messerschmidt at a 2025 press conference with leaders of other right-wing parties: Mona Juul, Alex Vanopslagh and Inger Støjberg

At the 2022 election, the party suffered its worst election result ever with 2.6% of the vote, equal to 5 seats. In December 2022, Morten Messerschmidt was acquitted of all charges related to prior allegations of misuse of EU funds according to several political analysts and commentators, paving the way for a restoration of the party. During January and February 2023, Mikkel Bjørn and Mette Thiesen, who were both elected for Nye Borgerlige, joined the Danish People's Party, increasing its seat count to seven. As of October 2025 the Danish People's Party has seen its support increased to around 9% in the polls. After participating in a public debate on 10 November 2025 against Danish Social Liberal Party's leader Martin Lidegaard in the city of Randers ahead of the 2025 municipal election, Messerschmidt attempted to sue his opponent in court for libel after an interview with Messerschmidt in Weekendavisen was brought up in the debate.

At the 2026 election, the party made significant gains, with 9.1% of the vote and 16 seats.

== Ideology and policies ==
DF is nationalist, as well as a right-wing populist party, and is positioned on the right, or far-right, of the political spectrum. DF's stated goals are to protect the freedom and cultural heritage of the Danish people, including the family, the monarchy and the Evangelical Lutheran Church of Denmark, to enforce a strict rule of law, to work against Denmark becoming a multi-cultural society by limiting immigration and promoting cultural assimilation of admitted immigrants, to maintain a strong welfare system for those in need, to promote entrepreneurship and economic growth by strengthening education and encouraging people to work, to protect the environment and natural resources, and to protect Danish sovereignty against the European Union. In comparison to its predecessor, the Progress Party, the DF focuses more on immigration, while at the same time being more pragmatic on other topics. While overall considered part of the radical right, its policies on most economic issues would rather place the party in the centre to centre-left. The party's former leader, Kristian Thulesen Dahl, once declared DF an anti-Muslim party.

=== Immigration ===
Poster for the 2007 election. It referred to the controversy the year before, depicting a hand-drawn image of Islamic prophet Muhammad with caption "Freedom of speech is Danish, censorship isn't it", and "We stand our ground on Danish values".

DF is opposed to immigration. The party holds that Denmark is not naturally a country of immigration. The party also does not accept a multi-ethnic transformation of Denmark, and rejects multiculturalism. Former party leader Pia Kjærsgaard stated she did "not want Denmark as a multiethnic, multicultural society", and that a multiethnic Denmark would be a "national disaster". The party seeks to drastically reduce non-Western immigration and favors cultural assimilation of immigrants from all religions. In 2010, the party proposed completely stopping all immigration from non-Western countries, a continuation of a proposal the month before to toughen the 24-year rule. They do, however, make the distinction between immigrants, those who intend to stay in Denmark permanently, and refugees, those that will only be in Denmark for the duration of the conflict, but ultimately intend to return home. The party has stated that it is more than happy to help those in need, but have a moral responsibility to the people of Denmark to keep Denmark Danish.

Cooperation with the Conservative-Liberal coalition government resulted in the implementation of some of their key demands, most importantly strong restrictions in immigration policies, which have resulted in what are often described as Europe's strictest immigration laws. The new government enacted rules that prevented Danish citizens and others from bringing a foreign spouse into the country unless both partners were aged 24 or above, passed a solvency test showing the Dane had not claimed social security for 12 months, and could lodge a bond of 60,011 kroner (about US$10,100). One declared aim of this was to fight arranged marriages. These new rules had the effect that while about 8,151 family reunification permits were granted in 2002, the number had fallen to 3,525 by 2005. Some social benefits for refugees were also cut by 30–40% during their first seven years in power. Ordinary unemployment benefits were replaced by a reduced "start-up aid". Whereas the government coalition's declared aim with this was to improve integration by inciting people to work, immigration spokesman Søren Krarup of DF has expressed his content in that the start-up aid has decreased the number of economic refugees greatly, showing them that "one does not find gold on the street, as has been told out in the third world". Nevertheless, total immigration increased post implementation of the migration reforms.

Under the leadership of Morten Messerschmidt, the party moved further to the right on immigration, calling for remigration, and for large-scale deportations of non-Western immigrants. The party also supports a review on all granted citizenships of the last 20 years.

=== Domestic policy ===
The party advocates stricter punishments for crimes such as rape, violence, sexual abuse, reckless driving, and cruelty to animals. It supports grants for specific research into terrorism, Islamism, and Cold War history as well as increased defense spending. It also wants to maintain the Danish monarchy and the current Danish constitution, and to abolish the 'hate speech' clause in the Danish criminal code.

=== Economy ===
The party has been described as "combining a strong anti-immigration and anti-multicultural right-wing value policy with a classic social democratic welfare policy". It is considered to be the first pure example of a radical right-wing populist party in Denmark; as such the party was described as the "pioneer of welfare chauvinism". According to Scandinavian Political Studies, the success of the party in the 2015 election was not based only on its hardline stance towards immigration, but also its support for pro-welfare, redistributive policies that voters considered highly neglected by the Social Democrats. This made "economic insecurity, marginalization, regional core–periphery divides" the decisive factors of the 2015 election. In the 2019 Danish general election, Social Democrats were then able to regain voters they lost to Danish People's Party by sharply turning left on welfare and redistribution, as well as shifting right on social issues by adopting "left-conservative" stances. DPP was therefore classified as economically left and socially right-wing, as it shares its voter base with a “left conservative” social democratic party, which Social Democrats became between 2015 and 2019.

Despite its right-wing orientation, Danish People's Party stands to the left of center on the issues of economic and welfare, favouring staunchly left-wing policies towards the elderly. However, the party also has a strong welfare chauvinist policy, and has some conservative inclinations on income benefits. While the populist nature of the party could make its program appear blurry and constantly oscillating between the economic centre and economic left, its economic stance is much closer to Social Democrats and the Socialist People's Party than the centre-left Danish Social Liberal Party. DPP largely tried to imitate the traditionally left-wing economic policies; this made DPP a "working-class party" that was able to attract manual workers at odds with the stance of left-wing Danish parties on socio-cultural issues. Prior to 2015, these voters would still vote for traditional left-wing parties as long as they identified with their economic positions and saw them as defenders of the working class.

Norwegian political scientist Anders Ravik Jupskås described Danish People's Party as a unique right-wing populist party that appeals to "authoritarian working class" and presents a platform that is "a combination of left-wing economics and nativist immigration policies". The party described itself as the "true defender of the Danish welfare state" and campaigned on excluding immigrants from the Danish welfare state as the best way to protect it. However, the party also spoke in favour of increasing spending for Danish pensions and healthcare, and it was found that the party's voters "most unanimously favour increasing expenditures, even in comparison with social democrats and left wing voters". The party warned against the creeping market liberalisation and attacked neoliberalism and globalization on both economic and social perspectives, which allowed it to make inroads with working-class voters. The party also promised to empower trade unions and entered cooperation agreements with minor unions and workers' associations.

=== Religion ===
The party is very hostile to Islam, and are cited as wanting a Denmark without any hint of Islam. They have proposed banning halal meat in order to reduce overall meat production and demand in Denmark, and suggested a conspiracy theory that Muslims were getting jobs in social security management in order to give other Muslims early retirement pensions.

=== Foreign policy ===
The party supported Danish participation in France's Operation Serval against Islamist fighters in Mali. However, it opposed proposals for Danish involvement in the Syrian Civil War.

==== Europe ====
DF is Eurosceptic. The party opposes a cession of Denmark's sovereignty to the European Union and opposes further EU integration and Eurofederalism. It also opposes the euro currency and wants to maintain the Danish krone. It is also against the potential accession of Turkey to the European Union. In 2007, the party opposed the Danish government's plan to recognise the independence of Kosovo, and maintained the territorial integrity of Serbia.

Although the party supports Ukraine in the Russo-Ukrainian War, it has stated that its support has an "expiration date", and expressed opposition to Ukrainian EU membership, criticising the Ukrainian government's approach to rule of law. In July 2024, the party's MEP Anders Vistisen proposed a motion stating there is "no military solution to the conflict and that peace is the only viable and sustainable solution", urging Ukraine and Russia to conduct peace talks. In 2025, party leader Morten Messerschmidt called for a scaling back of Danish military support for Ukraine, advocated for Ukraine to make territorial concessions to secure peace and expressed opposition to Ukrainian NATO membership while it remains in a state of war.

==== NATO ====
The DF supports Danish membership of NATO. The party initially voted in favour of the 2003 invasion of Iraq, but in 2014, the foreign affairs spokesman Søren Espersen said this support had been mistaken and that the rule of former dictator Saddam Hussein was "far preferable" to the events that followed. He claimed the party had "blindly followed" Prime Minister Anders Fogh Rasmussen at the time of the invasion.

The party supported Danish enforcement of a no-fly zone during the 2011 military intervention in Libya, but was initially sceptical of proposals for direct Danish military involvement. The party later supported the decision in solidarity with NATO. The party leadership subsequently supported extending the Danish mission in Libya, despite the disagreement of its defense spokesman Ib Poulsen. Three years after the intervention, foreign affairs spokesman Espersen stated the party's support for the intervention was a "mistake" and predicated on a misunderstanding of the ideology of the Libyan rebels.

==== Middle East ====
The DF supports Israel, opposes the recognition of Palestine on the grounds that there is no effective Palestinian state, and supports moving the Danish embassy in Israel to Jerusalem. In May 2025 they claimed that Israel's blockade of Gaza Strip aid was warranted, claiming that aid deliveries were used to smuggle weapons to Hamas.

==== Asia ====
The party seeks international recognition of Taiwan and supports Taiwan in its disputes with the People's Republic of China.

== Analysis of vote ==
- An analysis by the trade union SiD after the 2001 election stated that among unskilled workers aged under 40, 30% voted for DF and only 25% for the Social Democrats.
- Decreased importance of "economic cleavage": Several authors believe that the political "cleavages" of European societies have changed over recent decades Contemporary Western European democracies are characterized by two major cleavage dimensions: the economic cleavage dimension, which pits workers against the capital, and which concerns the degree of state involvement in the economy, and the socio-cultural cleavage dimension.
- Referendums brought the rejection of the Maastricht Treaty and the Euro. The DF has managed to harness this scepticism more effectively than others.

One feature, compared to other Danish parties, is that the Danish People's Party is usually underrepresented by about 1-1.5% in opinion polls. Election researchers have suggested that the party's voters may be less interested in politics, and therefore declining to talk to pollsters, or that voters are reluctant to reveal their support for the party to pollsters.

== Organization ==
=== Leaders ===
The party has had the following leaders since its foundation:

No.	Portrait	Leader	Took office	Left office	Time in office	Ref.
1	Pia Kjærsgaard	Pia Kjærsgaard (born 1947)	6 October 1995	11 September 2012	16 years, 341 days	
2	Kristian Thulesen Dahl	Kristian Thulesen Dahl (born 1969)	12 September 2012	23 January 2022	9 years, 133 days	
3	Morten Messerschmidt	Morten Messerschmidt (born 1980)	23 January 2022	Incumbent	4 years, 299 days	

=== International affiliations ===
The Danish People's Party distanced itself from the Sweden Democrats until 2010, when Pia Kjærsgaard travelled to Sweden to support the Sweden Democrats' election campaign. Danish People's Party foreign affairs spokesman Søren Espersen subsequently hosted the Sweden Democrats and said both parties would work together in the Nordic Council, with the parties ultimately forming the Nordic Freedom group in 2012. In the European Parliament, the Danish People's Party was initially part of Union for Europe of the Nations group from 1999 to 2009, alongside parties like the Polish Law and Justice and the Italian Lega Nord and National Alliance, as well as the associated Alliance for Europe of the Nations European political party. In 2009, it joined the UK Independence Party-led Europe of Freedom and Democracy group and the associated Movement for a Europe of Liberties and Democracy alliance, alongside its Nordic ally, the Finns Party. In 2014, along with the Finns Party, it moved to the British Conservative Party-dominated European Conservatives and Reformists group, and threatened to cut ties with the Sweden Democrats if they continued negotiations to join a new group involving the French National Front (FN) and the Freedom Party of Austria (FPÖ).

Despite this, the DF itself announced in 2019 that it would join a new European Parliament group led by the Lega Nord's Matteo Salvini called Identity and Democracy (ID), which also involved the FN and FPÖ. During a 2024 bid by the FN's successor, the National Rally, to exclude Alternative for Germany (AfD) from the ID Group, the DF stated that the AfD could only remain in the group if it expelled Maximilian Krah, and later joined the RN in voting to expel the AfD. After the 2024 European Parliament election, the DF joined the Patriots for Europe group, which was founded by the Hungarian Fidesz, the FPÖ and the Czech ANO 2011. In September 2024, National Rally leader Jordan Bardella visited Copenhagen to address the party conference and establish a "working partnership" with the DF.

== Election results ==
=== Parliament ===
Election	Leader	Votes	%	Seats	+/–	Government
1998	Pia Kjærsgaard	252,429	7.4 (#5)	13 / 179	Steady	Opposition
2001	Pia Kjærsgaard	413,987	12.0 (#3)	22 / 179	▲9	External support
2005	Pia Kjærsgaard	444,205	13.3 (#3)	24 / 179	▲2	External support
2007	Pia Kjærsgaard	479,532	13.9 (#3)	25 / 179	▲1	External support
2011	Pia Kjærsgaard	436,726	12.3 (#3)	22 / 179	▼3	Opposition
2015	Kristian Thulesen Dahl	741,539	21.1 (#2)	37 / 179	▲15	External support
2019	Kristian Thulesen Dahl	308,219	8.7 (#3)	16 / 179	▼21	Opposition
2022	Morten Messerschmidt	93,428	2.6 (#12)	5 / 179	▼11	Opposition
2026	Morten Messerschmidt	324,518	9.10 (#5)	16 / 179	▲11	Opposition

=== Local elections ===
Municipal elections

Year	Seats	
Year	#	±
1997	119 / 4,685	New
2001	168 / 4,647	▲49
Municipal reform
2005	125 / 2,522	▼43
2009	186 / 2,468	▲61
2013	255 / 2,444	▲69
2017	221 / 2,432	▼34
2021	90 / 2,436	▼131
2025	153 / 2,432	▲63

Regional elections

Year	Seats	
Year	#	±
1997	21 / 374	New
2001	24 / 374	▲3
Municipal reform
2005	14 / 205	▼10
2009	19 / 205	▲5
2013	23 / 205	▲4
2017	21 / 205	▼2
2021	6 / 205	▼15
2025	11 / 205	▲5

Mayors

Year	Seats	
Year	No.	±
2005	0 / 98	
2009	0 / 98	0
2013	0 / 98	0
2017	1 / 98	▲1
2021	0 / 98	▼1
2025	0 / 98	Steady

=== European Parliament ===
Year	List leader	Votes	%	Seats	+/–	EP Group
1999	Mogens Camre	114,865	5.83 (#8)	1 / 16	New	UEN
2004	Mogens Camre	128,789	6.80 (#6)	1 / 14	0	UEN
2009	Morten Messerschmidt	357,942	15.28 (#4)	2 / 13	▲1	EFD
2014	Morten Messerschmidt	605,889	26.61 (#1)	4 / 13	▲2	ECR
2019	Peter Kofod	296,978	10.76 (#4)	1 / 14	▼3	ID
2024	Anders Vistisen	156,014	6.37 (#9)	1 / 15	0	PfE

== See also ==
- List of political parties in Denmark
- Politics of Denmark

== Sources ==
- Rydgren, Jens (May 2004). "Explaining the Emergence of Radical Right-Wing Populist Parties: The Case of Denmark". West European Politics. 27 (3): 474–502. doi:10.1080/0140238042000228103. S2CID 55947108.
- Meret, Susi (2010). The Danish People's Party, the Italian Northern League and the Austrian Freedom Party in a Comparative Perspective: Party Ideology and Electoral Support (PhD thesis). SPIRIT PhD Series. Vol. 25. University of Aalborg. ISSN 1903-7783.
