= Fuån =

Stream in Sweden

Coordinates: 60°56′41″N 14°42′46″E

Fuån (Swedish pronunciation: [Fʉːoːn]) is a stream in Dalarna, Sweden. Its source is in Orsa municipality, a few kilometres southeast of Orsa. It runs southwards and flows into the lake Siljan close to the village Fu. The stream has a total length of approximately 15 kilometres.

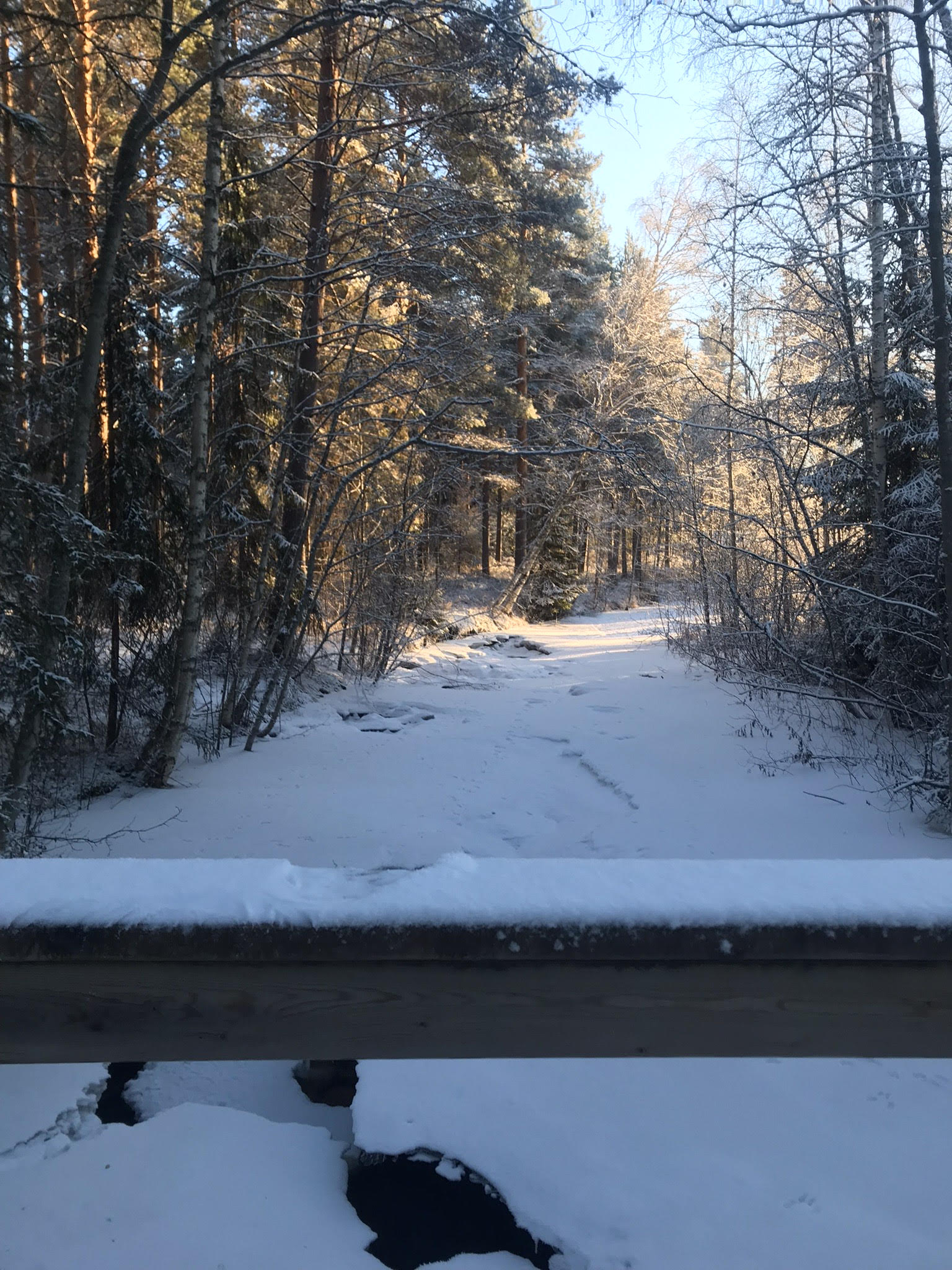
A view of Fuån during December.
