= Opinion polling for the 2026 Danish general election =

In the run-up to the 2026 Danish general election, various organisations carried out opinion polling to gauge voting intentions in Denmark. Results of such polls are displayed in this list. The date range for these opinion polls are from the 2022 Danish general election, held on 1 November, to 23 March 2026. The election was held on 24 March 2026.

== Opinion polls ==
=== Nationwide polls ===
A: Social Democrats
V: Venstre
M: Moderates
F: Green Left
Æ: Denmark Democrats
I: Liberal Alliance
C: Conservative People's Party
Ø: Red-Green Alliance
B: Social Liberal Party
D: New Right
Å: The Alternative
O: Danish People's Party
H: Citizens' Party

=== 2026 ===
Polling execution			Parties														Blocs			
Polling firm	Fieldwork date	Sample size	A	V	M	F	Æ	I	C	Ø	B	Å	O	H	Others	Lead	Gov.	Opp.	Red	Blue
2026 election result		–	21.85	10.14	7.68	11.59	5.75	9.37	7.59	6.34	5.82	2.58	9.10	2.13	0.07 (Note: Independents: 0.07%)	10.26	39.67	60.33	48.18	44.08
Voxmeter	23 Mar 2026	4,200	22.4	9.7	7.1	11.8	6.9	10.8	6.8	6.1	5.2	2.8	7.6	2.8	—	10.6	39.2	60.8	48.3	44.6
Epinion	21 Mar 2026	1,662	20.0	8.6	6.6	12.6	6.9	11.0	7.6	7.9	5.0	2.0	9.5	2.2	—	7.4	35.2	64.7	47.5	45.8
Voxmeter	17–19 Mar 2026	1,022	21.5	9.4	7.4	12.8	7.1	9.4	7.2	6.8	5.3	2.5	7.3	2.9		8.7	38.3	61.3	48.9	43.3
Megafon	17–18 Mar 2026	1,010	21.9	9.5	6.5	13.0	6.7	11.0	6.5	5.3	6.3	2.8	7.7	2.7	0.1	8.9	37.9	62.0	49.3	44.1
YouGov	1–18 Mar 2026	4,966	21.4	9.3	5.8	13.6	6.2	9.8	7.7	6.3	4.7	2.3	10.1	2.3	0.2	7.8	36.5	63.0	48.4	45.4
Epinion	15–17 Mar 2026	1,969	21.2	9.3	5.7	12.4	7.4	11.6	7.1	6.5	5.7	1.8	8.4	2.8	—	8.8	36.2	63.7	47.6	46.6
Verian	13–17 Mar 2026	1,608	21.7	12.0	6.7	12.7	7.0	9.4	6.7	5.6	6.5	3.1	6.6	1.9		9.0	40.4	59.5	49.6	43.6
Voxmeter	14–16 Mar 2026	1,043	21.0	8.9	6.9	13.4	7.7	11.0	6.9	6.3	6.2	2.2	6.1	3.3	0.1	7.6	36.8	63.1	49.1	43.9
Epinion	12–14 Mar 2026	2,175	19.1	10.3	5.2	14.0	6.0	10.5	7.1	7.6	5.0	2.0	9.5	3.3	0.4	5.1	34.6	65.4	47.7	46.7
Voxmeter	11–13 Mar 2026	1,023	21.5	10.0	6.2	12.8	7.5	12.1	6.5	6.4	5.1	2.0	7.0	2.6	0.3	8.7	37.7	62.0	47.8	45.7
Megafon	9–12 Mar 2026	1,010	21.5	10.6	5.4	13.2	7.5	10.6	6.3	6.2	6.1	3.0	6.1	3.9	0.2	8.3	37.5	62.9	50.0	44.4
Verian	8–11 Mar 2026	1,787	23.7	9.7	5.2	13.4	7.5	9.5	7.3	6.5	5.6	2.4	7.0	2.2	0.0	10.3	38.6	61.4	51.6	43.2
Epinion	10–12 Mar 2026	2,183	20.6	10.4	4.6	12.2	6.8	11.1	6.6	6.8	5.1	2.7	9.8	3.1	0.2	8.4	35.6	64.4	47.4	47.8
Voxmeter	8–10 Mar 2026	1,049	21.7	10.4	5.8	11.6	8.8	12.0	5.8	6.9	4.9	2.8	6.5	2.6	0.2	9.7	37.9	61.9	47.9	46.1
Epinion	7–9 Mar 2026	2,177	19.1	9.5	6.5	12.6	8.3	10.9	7.6	6.5	6.1	1.5	8.3	2.9	—	6.5	35.1	64.9	45.8	47.5
Voxmeter	5–7 Mar 2026	1,030	22.3	9.0	4.9	13.0	8.5	11.4	6.7	6.4	5.4	2.7	7.4	2.2	0.2	9.3	36.2	63.9	49.7	45.5
Epinion	3–5 Mar 2026	2,285	21.0	10.1	5.1	11.6	8.2	11.0	7.3	6.6	4.6	2.7	8.7	2.6	—	9.4	36.2	63.2	46.4	48.0
Epinion	2–4 Mar 2026	2,198	20.0	9.7	4.9	12.3	8.8	11.5	8.0	6.0	4.3	2.6	8.3	2.6	—	7.7	34.6	65.4	45.2	48.9
Voxmeter	2–4 Mar 2026	1,053	23.5	8.2	5.7	13.1	7.9	12.1	6.6	5.9	4.8	1.9	7.6	2.4	—	10.4	37.4	62.3	49.2	44.8
Verian	25 Feb – 3 Mar 2026	1,620	21.9	9.9	5.3	14.6	7.4	10.0	7.0	6.7	3.7	1.8	9.5	1.9	—	7.3	37.1	62.6	48.7	45.7
Epinion	27 Feb – 1 Mar 2026	1,957	21.6	8.9	5.6	13.8	8.0	10.3	6.6	6.6	4.0	3.3	8.3	2.6	—	7.8	36.1	63.5	49.3	44.7
Voxmeter	23 Feb – 1 Mar 2026	1,003	22.1	9.4	7.0	13.2	8.8	11.7	5.6	6.9	4.0	2.5	6.5	2.2	0.1	8.9	38.5	61.4	48.7	44.2
Verian	26–27 Feb 2026	1,829	21.5	9.1	6.6	14.3	8.0	10.6	6.8	6.8	5.0	1.7	7.2	1.9	—	7.2	37.2	62.3	49.3	43.6
Epinion	26 Feb 2026	1,576	20.8	8.9	5.7	14.4	8.3	10.2	5.8	7.2	4.1	2.9	7.8	2.9	—	6.8	35.4	63.6	49.4	43.9
26 Feb 2026		Mette Frederiksen announces the election will be held on 24 March 2026.																		
Voxmeter	16–22 Feb 2026	1,007	22.1	11.2	8.1	12.1	9.0	11.1	6.8	5.7	5.3	1.7	5.0	1.6	0.3	10.0	41.3	58.3	46.9	44.7
Voxmeter	9–15 Feb 2026	1,003	21.2	11.5	6.7	13.8	9.7	9.6	6.6	6.1	4.1	1.9	5.7	2.3	0.8	7.4	39.4	59.8	47.1	45.4
Verian	28 Jan–3 Feb 2026	1,703	23.2	11.3	4.7	13.1	8.7	10.1	7.0	7.6	3.9	1.8	7.3	1.2	0.1	10.1	39.2	60.8	47.9	45.6
Voxmeter	2-8 Feb 2026	1,001	22.5	10.7	6.3	13.0	9.0	9.7	7.7	6.3	3.8	1.9	6.0	2.3	0.8	9.5	39.5	60.5	47.5	45.4
Voxmeter	25 Jan–1 Feb 2026	1,001	22.3	12.0	5.0	11.3	9.2	10.0	7.4	6.2	4.7	2.3	6.8	1.9	0.9	10.3	39.3	59.8	46.8	47.3
Epinion	21–28 Jan 2026	2,034	21.6	9.9	4.6	13.0	8.8	11.4	7.1	6.9	5.2	2.2	7.0	1.9	0.0	8.6	36.1	63.5	48.9	46.7
Voxmeter	19–25 Jan 2026	1,035	23.1	10.8	7.0	12.6	8.9	10.5	6.5	7.3	3.7	1.7	5.4	2.0	0.5	10.5	40.9	58.6	48.4	44.1
Voxmeter	12–18 Jan 2026	1,007	21.2	11.0	5.0	14.0	9.9	10.9	6.9	6.0	4.3	2.3	6.6	1.6	0.3	7.2	37.2	62.5	47.8	46.9
Voxmeter	5–11 Jan 2026	1,005	19.8	10.8	3.3	14.9	10.3	10.5	6.6	7.5	5.4	2.4	6.5	1.5	0.5	4.9	33.9	65.6	50.0	46.2
2022 election result		–	27.50	13.32	9.27	8.30	8.12	7.89	5.51	5.13	3.79	3.33	2.64	—	5.21 (Note: D: 3.67%, Q: 0.90%, K: 0.52%, independents: 0.12%)	14.18	50.09	49.79	48.95	41.65

=== 2025 ===
Polling execution			Parties														Blocs			
Polling firm	Fieldwork date	Sample size	A	V	M	F	Æ	I	C	Ø	B	Å	O	H	Others	Lead	Gov.	Opp.	Red	Blue
Voxmeter	15–21 Dec 2025	1,005	18.9	12.2	2.8	13.9	10.0	11.2	7.9	6.1	5.4	2.1	6.8	2.3	0.4	5.0	33.9	65.7	46.4	50.4
Voxmeter	8–14 Dec 2025	1,000	18.6	11.7	2.4	14.3	9.2	11.7	7.8	7.0	5.2	2.0	8.0	1.7	0.4	4.3	32.7	67.3	47.1	50.1
Epinion	4–11 Dec 2025	2,034	16.5	11.6	1.5	16.0	9.9	10.4	8.5	6.8	5.1	1.7	9.3	2.2	0.0	0.5	29.6	70.4	46.1	51.9
Voxmeter	1–7 Dec 2025	1,005	18.0	11.3	2.7	15.6	8.6	12.2	7.0	7.7	4.6	1.6	8.1	2.0	0.6	2.4	32.0	68.0	47.5	49.2
Megafon	1 Dec–4 Dec 2025	1,008	17.7	12.7	2.2	14.8	8.4	11.9	8.6	7.3	4.7	1.7	7.9	1.1	0.7	2.9	32.6	67.4	46.2	50.5
Verian	26 Nov–2 Dec 2025	1,672	19.5	11.3	3.3	15.7	9.6	11.0	7.3	5.7	4.8	1.7	8.7	1.0	1.4	3.8	34.1	65.9	48.1	48.6
Voxmeter	24–30 Nov 2025	1,002	19.4	12.0	2.9	14.7	8.5	10.9	7.2	7.0	4.0	2.2	8.9	2.0	0.3	4.7	34.3	65.7	47.3	49.5
Epinion	19–25 Nov 2025	2,034	17.5	11.5	1.8	14.1	10.5	11.8	8.8	6.5	3.7	3.0	8.7	1.4	0.0	3.4	30.8	69.2	44.8	52.7
Voxmeter	17–23 Nov 2025	1,024	19.3	11.5	2.4	13.0	8.2	12.8	7.3	7.6	5.2	1.7	8.3	2.0	0.5	6.3	33.2	66.8	46.8	50.1
2025 local elections		—N/a	23.2	17.9	1.3	11.1	4.6	5.5	12.7	7.1	5.4	1.1	5.9	—N/a	4.3	5.3	42.4	57.7	47.9	46.6
Voxmeter	10–16 Nov 2025	1,007	19.9	10.4	2.9	12.1	9.2	11.4	7.2	7.7	6.2	2.1	8.3	2.1	0.5	7.8	33.2	66.8	48.0	48.6
Voxmeter	3–9 Nov 2025	1,005	21.1	9.6	3.1	12.2	9.5	9.9	7.9	6.6	5.8	1.8	8.4	3.1	1.0	8.9	33.8	66.2	47.5	48.4
Megafon	3-6 Nov 2025	1,006	19.8	11.2	2.8	16.2	8.0	10.9	7.0	7.2	4.4	1.9	9.4	0.4	0.8	3.6	33.8	66.2	49.5	46.9
Verian	29 Oct–4 Nov 2025	1,784	22.8	10.5	3.3	12.5	7.6	10.5	7.9	7.3	3.8	1.3	10.1	0.9	1.3	10.3	36.6	63.4	48.1	48.4
Voxmeter	27 Oct–2 Nov 2025	1,005	21.1	10.5	3.5	12.3	8.0	10.8	7.1	7.0	5.4	2.1	9.6	2.1	0.5	8.8	35.1	64.9	47.9	48.1
Voxmeter	20–26 Oct 2025	1,002	21.2	10.4	4.4	12.6	9.3	11.3	6.3	6.7	4.1	1.8	9.4	2.2	0.3	8.6	36.0	64.0	46.4	48.9
Voxmeter	13–19 Oct 2025	1,004	20.0	11.8	3.7	12.4	9.0	11.0	6.4	7.2	4.2	2.3	9.2	2.0	0.8	7.6	35.5	64.5	46.1	49.4
Voxmeter	6–12 Oct 2025	1,004	20.3	10.7	3.3	12.5	9.5	12.2	6.2	6.3	5.2	2.9	8.9	1.5	0.4	7.7	34.3	65.7	47.3	49.0
Voxmeter	23 Sep–5 Oct 2025	1,031	19.2	9.5	4.2	13.1	9.1	13.0	6.9	7.3	4.8	2.2	8.3	1.8	0.6	6.1	32.9	67.1	46.6	48.6
Epinion	26 Sep–2 Oct 2025	2,052	20.9	9.1	2.7	12.5	7.9	11.4	6.2	7.6	4.8	2.4	12.0	1.4	1.1	8.4	32.7	67.3	48.2	48.0
Verian	24–30 Sep 2025	1,638	22.1	10.3	3.1	14.2	8.6	12.3	5.7	7.2	4.2	1.2	9.2	0.9	0.8	7.9	35.5	64.5	49.1	47.6
Voxmeter	22–28 Sep 2025	1,006	20.4	10.0	3.4	12.0	9.6	11.7	7.0	7.3	4.2	2.7	8.1	2.3	1.3	8.4	33.8	66.2	46.6	48.7
Megafon	22–25 Sep 2025	1,014	21.6	9.0	3.2	12.6	8.8	12.8	8.1	7.2	4.9	1.7	7.8	1.7	0.6	8.8	33.8	66.2	48.0	48.2
Voxmeter	15–21 Sep 2025	1,014	21.7	10.7	3.0	12.5	8.4	12.3	6.6	8.2	3.5	2.0	8.4	2.1	0.6	9.2	35.4	64.6	47.9	48.5
Voxmeter	8–14 Sep 2025	1,006	22.0	9.2	3.0	12.6	9.2	12.8	6.0	7.8	3.6	3.2	7.8	1.4	0.8	9.2	34.8	65.2	49.2	47.0
Voxmeter	1–7 Sep 2025	1,000	21.4	11.0	3.2	13.3	10.2	11.8	6.2	7.4	3.9	2.6	6.5	1.9	0.6	8.1	35.6	64.4	48.6	47.6
Voxmeter	25–31 Aug 2025	1,001	19.5	9.4	3.2	14.7	9.3	13.3	7.1	6.8	4.4	2.3	7.8	1.3	0.9	4.8	32.0	68.0	47.7	48.2
Voxmeter	18–24 Aug 2025	1,004	20.3	10.6	3.3	14.5	10.0	11.6	6.7	6.3	5.1	2.1	7.5	1.0	1.0	5.8	34.2	65.8	48.3	47.4
Epinion	13–20 Aug 2025	1,582	19.5	10.0	3.9	15.2	8.9	12.5	6.0	7.3	4.3	2.1	8.1	1.0	1.2	6.8	34.6	64.7	49.8	45.4
Voxmeter	11–17 Aug 2025	1,065	21.6	9.6	2.7	13.0	9.4	12.8	7.2	7.2	4.5	2.5	6.9	1.8	0.8	8.6	33.9	65.3	48.8	47.7
Voxmeter	23–29 Jun 2025	1,002	22.4	11.0	4.0	13.0	8.7	13.1	6.2	7.0	4.3	1.9	5.8	2.5	0.1	9.3	37.4	62.5	48.6	47.3
Voxmeter	16–22 Jun 2025	1,052	21.6	10.9	2.9	13.8	10.2	12.2	6.1	7.3	3.7	2.6	5.6	2.5	0.6	7.8	35.4	64.0	49.0	47.5
Megafon	16–19 Jun 2025	1,018	22.2	11.3	3.3	14.2	7.7	12.0	7.5	6.5	5.1	1.7	6.7	1.5	0.3	8.0	36.8	62.9	49.7	46.7
Voxmeter	9–15 Jun 2025	1,007	22.7	10.1	3.1	13.2	10.1	12.5	6.2	8.2	4.2	3.1	4.8	1.4	0.4	9.5	35.9	63.7	51.4	45.1
Voxmeter	2–8 Jun 2025	1,011	23.8	11.1	3.6	12.5	10.5	10.8	6.1	7.5	4.4	2.5	5.0	1.7	0.5	11.3	38.5	61.0	50.7	45.2
Epinion	26 May–2 Jun 2025	1,582	21.1	9.4	4.1	14.3	9.5	11.7	5.4	7.5	4.1	2.8	7.6	1.8	—	6.8	34.6	64.7	49.8	45.4
Voxmeter	19–25 May 2025	1,003	23.8	10.9	4.4	13.2	8.5	13.1	6.6	6.7	4.5	2.4	3.7	2.1	0.1	10.6	39.1	60.8	50.6	44.9
Voxmeter	12–18 May 2025	1,001	24.0	10.0	3.3	13.9	9.6	13.3	5.7	6.7	4.9	2.1	4.4	1.7	0.4	10.1	37.3	62.3	51.6	44.7
Voxmeter	5–11 May 2025	1,007	23.4	10.6	3.4	12.8	9.3	12.3	6.2	7.3	4.2	3.0	5.2	0.9	1.4	10.6	37.4	61.2	50.7	44.5
Voxmeter	28 Apr–4 May 2025	1,003	22.9	9.2	3.8	14.1	9.9	13.5	5.4	8.0	4.7	1.9	5.2	1.1	0.3	8.8	35.9	62.7	51.6	44.3
Epinion	22–29 Apr 2025	1,483	22.9	10.3	3.9	13.6	10.4	13.1	5.7	7.1	4.4	2.6	5.7	1.1	—	9.3	37.1	63.7	50.6	46.3
Voxmeter	21–27 Apr 2025	1,005	22.4	9.5	3.5	13.7	9.6	14.0	6.4	7.8	4.0	2.0	4.9	1.7	0.5	8.4	35.4	62.1	49.9	46.1
Voxmeter	14–20 Apr 2025	1,002	23.5	10.0	3.5	12.7	9.2	13.1	5.6	7.6	4.9	2.1	4.8	2.4	0.6	10.4	37.0	62.4	50.8	45.1
Voxmeter	7–13 Apr 2025	1,007	22.6	9.2	3.5	13.9	9.2	12.2	6.1	7.1	6.4	2.9	4.1	1.9	0.9	8.7	35.3	63.8	52.9	42.7
Voxmeter	31 Mar–6 Apr 2025	1,016	22.8	10.1	4.3	14.0	9.2	13.8	5.6	6.2	5.3	2.2	4.5	1.5	0.5	8.8	37.2	62.3	50.5	44.7
Verian	26 Mar–1 Apr 2025	1,641	22.5	10.8	3.8	15.0	8.3	12.9	5.8	6.9	4.0	1.6	5.3	1.8	1.3	8.8	37.2	62.3	50.5	44.7
Voxmeter	24–30 Mar 2025	1,076	22.6	10.4	3.2	13.3	10.4	13.0	6.4	6.9	4.8	2.0	4.7	1.8	0.5	9.3	36.2	63.3	49.6	46.7
Epinion	19–26 Mar 2025	1,640	23.2	9.3	3.6	14.9	10.8	12.8	5.5	6.6	4.7	2.0	4.5	1.2	—	8.3	36.1	63.0	51.4	44.1
Voxmeter	17–23 Mar 2025	1,002	23.8	9.3	4.0	12.5	9.4	12.2	7.0	6.3	5.2	2.2	5.2	1.9	1.0	11.3	37.1	61.9	50.0	45.0
Voxmeter	10–16 Mar 2025	1,005	23.4	10.5	3.4	13.2	10.4	11.8	6.5	6.5	4.0	2.5	4.8	2.1	0.9	10.2	37.3	61.8	49.6	46.1
Voxmeter	3–9 Mar 2025	1,002	23.2	9.8	3.3	14.4	10.1	11.2	6.8	6.9	4.6	2.2	4.8	1.3	1.3	8.8	36.3	62.4	51.3	44.0
Verian	26 Feb–4 Mar 2025	1,797	21.9	11.1	4.3	14.5	9.2	10.5	7.6	6.5	4.4	2.2	5.3	1.6	2.5	8.8	36.3	62.4	51.3	44.0
Voxmeter	24 Feb–2 Mar 2025	1,012	22.6	11.1	3.5	15.0	10.0	12.1	6.2	5.8	4.0	2.3	4.2	1.7	1.5	7.6	37.2	61.3	49.7	45.3
Voxmeter	17–23 Feb 2025	1,013	21.8	10.5	3.5	13.6	10.0	13.2	6.2	6.5	4.3	2.7	4.2	2.2	1.3	8.2	35.8	62.9	48.9	46.3
Voxmeter	10–16 Feb 2025	1,002	21.0	10.3	4.1	14.2	9.7	12.2	6.7	6.9	4.5	2.7	5.3	1.3	1.1	6.8	35.4	63.5	49.3	45.5
Voxmeter	3–9 Feb 2025	1,028	19.9	10.7	4.0	14.2	9.3	11.6	6.9	8.0	4.5	2.3	4.7	1.6	2.3	5.7	34.6	63.1	48.9	44.8
Verian	29 Jan–4 Feb 2025	1,897	23.0	11.4	4.0	14.4	9.6	9.2	7.2	6.6	4.4	1.8	5.4	1.8	1.2	8.6	38.4	61.6	50.2	48.6
Voxmeter	27 Jan–2 Feb 2025	1,010	20.4	9.5	3.7	14.9	10.0	12.3	7.8	7.2	4.3	1.5	4.5	2.2	1.7	5.5	33.6	64.7	48.3	46.3
Voxmeter	20–26 Jan 2025	1,001	20.4	10.1	3.2	15.1	11.7	11.8	7.0	7.0	4.5	1.7	4.1	1.2	2.2	5.3	33.7	64.1	49.6	45.5
Epinion	15–22 Jan 2025	1,635	19.7	8.6	4.4	15.8	11.5	11.6	6.8	6.8	4.1	2.4	4.9	1.8	—	3.9	32.7	63.9	48.8	43.4
Voxmeter	13–19 Jan 2025	1,014	19.1	9.2	3.5	16.0	10.5	13.1	6.6	7.2	5.3	2.0	5.1	1.0	1.4	3.1	31.8	66.8	49.6	45.5
Voxmeter	6–12 Jan 2025	1,039	19.2	10.5	3.5	17.3	11.1	12.1	6.6	6.3	4.8	1.6	4.2	—	2.8	1.9	33.2	64.0	48.7	45.9
2022 election result		–	27.50	13.32	9.27	8.30	8.12	7.89	5.51	5.13	3.79	3.33	2.64	—	5.21 (Note: D: 3.67%, Q: 0.90%, K: 0.52%, independents: 0.12%)	14.18	50.09	49.79	48.95	41.65

=== 2024 ===
Polling execution			Parties														Blocs			
Polling firm	Fieldwork date	Sample size	A	V	M	F	Æ	I	C	Ø	B	D	Å	O	Others	Lead	Gov.	Opp.	Red	Blue
Voxmeter	16–23 Dec 2024	1,002	20.0	9.5	3.9	15.9	10.3	13.2	5.5	7.0	4.0	—	1.9	4.9	3.9	4.1	33.4	63.7	48.8	43.4
Voxmeter	9–15 Dec 2024	1,032	20.4	10.3	3.4	16.1	10.5	12.2	6.2	7.6	5.0	—	2.4	4.0	1.9	4.3	34.1	64.0	51.5	43.2
Verian	4–10 Dec 2024	1,737	19.6	11.8	3.7	16.8	9.7	11.9	5.1	7.6	3.8	0.2	1.7	6.8	1.3	2.8	35.1	64.4	49.5	45.3
Epinion	4 Nov–10 Dec 2024	1,590	19.6	9.6	3.5	14.4	10.4	13.4	6.1	7.2	5.3	—	2.2	6.2	—	5.2	32.7	65.2	48.7	45.7
Voxmeter	2–8 Dec 2024	1,001	19.2	10.6	3.6	17.3	10.7	12.4	5.7	6.8	4.9	—	2.7	4.4	1.7	1.9	33.4	64.9	50.9	43.8
Voxmeter	25 Nov–1 Dec 2024	1,017	20.2	10.6	4.6	17.1	11.0	12.6	5.4	6.3	4.1	—	2.1	4.2	1.8	3.1	35.4	62.8	49.8	43.8
Voxmeter	18–24 Nov 2024	1,010	18.5	10.0	3.9	18.1	11.7	11.9	6.2	6.4	4.4	—	2.7	4.4	1.8	0.4	32.4	65.8	50.1	44.2
Voxmeter	11–17 Nov 2024	1,038	18.7	10.1	4.2	17.0	10.7	12.7	6.8	6.7	4.9	—	2.2	4.6	1.4	1.7	33.0	65.6	49.5	44.9
Verian	6–13 Nov 2024	2,035	20.9	11.6	4.2	14.0	9.4	11.9	7.2	7.9	3.6	0.7	2.2	5.1	1.3	6.9	36.7	62.6	48.6	45.2
Voxmeter	4–10 Nov 2024	1,002	19.2	9.9	4.0	16.3	11.1	13.9	5.3	7.0	4.8	—	2.7	4.1	1.7	2.9	32.1	65.2	50.0	44.3
Epinion	30 Oct–6 Nov 2024	1,592	19.3	9.5	3.4	16.0	11.1	12.8	6.7	7.1	5.2	—	2.2	5.2	—	3.3	32.2	66.3	48.7	45.3
Voxmeter	28 Oct–3 Nov 2024	1,249	20.4	10.7	3.4	16.6	10.6	12.9	5.4	6.1	4.4	—	2.7	4.9	1.9	4.2	34.5	63.6	50.2	44.5
Voxmeter	21–27 Oct 2024	1,001	20.8	12.3	3.3	15.4	9.4	13.3	6.0	7.0	4.7	—	2.3	3.7	1.8	5.4	36.4	62.8	50.2	44.7
Voxmeter	14–21 Oct 2024	1,002	19.6	11.1	3.4	16.9	9.9	12.5	6.8	7.2	3.5	—	2.0	4.2	2.8	2.7	34.1	63.1	49.3	44.5
Voxmeter	7–13 Oct 2024	1,005	20.1	9.9	4.3	15.8	9.8	13.4	6.1	7.8	4.1	—	2.1	4.8	1.8	4.3	34.3	63.9	49.9	44.0
Voxmeter	23–30 Sep 2024	1,003	21.7	10.3	3.5	15.2	10.8	11.6	5.9	8.3	4.5	—	1.4	4.6	2.2	6.5	35.5	62.3	51.1	43.2
Epinion	20–27 Sep 2024	1,614	19.9	10.4	4.0	14.8	9.9	13.0	6.5	7.7	4.2	—	2.2	5.7	—	5.1	34.3	64.0	48.8	45.5
Voxmeter	16–22 Sep 2024	1,005	20.5	10.3	5.1	15.9	9.5	12.1	6.0	7.4	5.3	—	2.2	4.1	1.6	4.6	35.9	62.5	51.3	42.0
Voxmeter	9–15 Sep 2024	1,003	19.1	9.7	5.8	16.9	9.6	13.0	5.7	8.1	5.7	—	1.8	4.0	1.6	2.2	34.6	63.8	51.6	42.0
Verian	4–10 Sep 2024	1,467	18.9	9.7	4.2	15.9	8.6	13.2	6.1	7.9	5.3	0.5	1.6	6.4	1.7	3.0	32.8	66.5	49.6	44.5
Voxmeter	2–8 Sep 2024	1,009	20.3	10.4	4.6	15.8	10.5	12.0	6.1	6.7	5.4	—	1.9	4.4	1.9	4.5	35.3	62.8	50.1	43.4
Voxmeter	26 Aug–1 Sep 2024	1,009	21.7	9.3	5.6	14.0	9.4	12.0	6.7	7.4	5.3	—	2.2	5.0	1.4	7.7	36.6	62.0	50.6	42.4
Voxmeter	19–25 Aug 2024	1,004	22.2	9.7	6.0	15.2	9.6	11.0	6.7	7.7	4.7	—	1.8	4.2	1.2	7.0	37.9	61.9	51.6	41.2
Voxmeter	12–18 Aug 2024	1,003	21.8	11.0	6.6	14.6	9.9	10.0	5.7	7.8	5.3	—	2.1	3.9	1.3	7.2	39.4	60.3	51.6	40.5
Epinion	7–14 Aug 2024	1,972	19.2	8.9	6.3	16.0	11.5	12.8	6.6	6.9	4.1	—	1.7	4.9	—	3.2	34.4	64.5	47.9	44.7
Voxmeter	5–11 Aug 2024	1,001	21.3	9.7	6.9	15.1	9.4	11.0	6.0	7.9	5.5	—	1.7	4.8	0.7	6.2	37.9	61.4	51.5	40.9
Voxmeter	17–23 Jun 2024	1,007	18.4	9.7	6.5	18.8	9.0	13.1	6.0	6.4	5.4	—	1.7	4.6	0.4	0.4	34.6	65.0	50.7	42.4
Voxmeter	10–16 Jun 2024	1,002	19.4	10.3	6.1	16.9	9.4	13.5	6.1	7.6	4.3	—	2.4	3.5	0.5	2.5	35.8	63.7	50.6	42.8
Verian	10–12 Jun 2024	1,288	16.9	9.9	6.3	17.9	10.7	13.2	6.4	6.2	5.2	0.4	1.4	4.4	1.1	1.0	33.1	66.6	47.6	45.0
2024 EU election result		–	15.57	14.72	5.95	17.42	7.39	6.95	8.84	7.04	7.07	—	2.66	6.37	—	1.85	36.24	63.74	49.76	41.65
Voxmeter	3–9 Jun 2024	1,009	19.9	8.9	5.3	15.3	8.6	14.2	6.2	8.0	5.1	—	3.4	3.9	1.2	4.6	34.1	64.7	51.7	41.8
Epinion	28 May–3 Jun 2024	1,653	19.3	7.7	6.9	14.9	10.8	13.0	6.1	8.2	4.2	—	3.0	4.9	—	4.4	33.9	65.1	49.6	42.5
Voxmeter	27 May–2 Jun 2024	1,001	20.6	8.1	6.2	13.4	9.8	15.9	4.5	7.9	4.3	—	2.9	4.8	1.6	4.7	34.9	63.5	49.1	43.1
Voxmeter	20–26 May 2024	1,009	20.2	7.6	7.4	13.0	9.7	15.2	5.4	8.3	5.6	—	2.4	4.2	1.0	5.0	35.2	63.8	49.5	42.9
Voxmeter	13–19 May 2024	1,003	20.9	7.7	6.7	13.7	9.9	16.0	4.6	7.6	5.0	—	3.0	3.7	1.2	4.9	35.3	63.5	50.2	41.9
Verian	8–14 May 2024	1,565	19.0	9.2	6.6	15.0	9.4	14.6	5.7	7.7	3.7	0.5	2.1	5.4	1.1	4.0	34.8	64.7	47.5	44.8
Epinion	8–14 May 2024	1,502	17.8	8.7	4.5	14.6	12.0	15.6	6.4	7.4	3.6	—	2.4	5.5	—	2.2	31.0	67.5	45.8	48.2
Voxmeter	6–12 May 2024	1,004	20.3	8.1	5.9	13.8	9.7	15.5	5.5	8.8	4.2	—	2.6	4.3	1.3	4.8	34.3	64.4	49.7	43.1
Voxmeter	29 Apr–5 May 2024	1,007	21.5	8.4	5.8	13.0	9.3	16.0	5.4	9.7	4.2	—	2.2	3.7	0.8	5.5	35.6	63.5	50.6	42.8
Epinion	23–29 Apr 2024	1,938	19.2	6.5	5.8	14.7	11.6	16.3	5.9	6.9	4.7	—	2.7	4.9	—	2.9	31.5	68.5	48.2	45.2
Voxmeter	22–28 Apr 2024	1,002	21.4	8.0	6.3	13.6	9.7	15.3	4.6	7.5	5.4	—	2.9	4.0	1.3	6.1	35.7	63.0	50.8	41.6
Voxmeter	15–21 Apr 2024	1,003	21.8	8.9	7.8	14.1	10.7	14.4	4.7	6.8	4.7	—	2.5	2.9	0.7	7.4	38.5	60.8	49.9	41.6
Voxmeter	8–14 Apr 2024	1,001	23.2	8.9	6.9	13.5	9.9	14.1	5.1	7.9	5.4	—	2.0	2.8	0.3	9.1	39.0	60.7	52.0	40.8
Voxmeter	1–7 Apr 2024	1,007	22.1	9.0	6.0	15.1	10.4	12.6	5.8	7.1	5.2	—	2.5	3.6	0.6	7.0	37.1	62.3	52.0	41.4
Voxmeter	25–31 Mar 2024	1,004	20.8	9.7	6.7	14.1	9.6	13.7	6.4	7.8	4.7	—	2.0	3.6	0.9	6.7	37.2	61.9	49.4	43.0
Voxmeter	18–25 Mar 2024	1,002	19.6	9.2	5.8	15.1	10.3	13.9	6.0	8.2	4.5	—	2.2	3.0	2.2	4.5	34.6	63.2	49.6	42.4
Verian	15–21 Mar 2024	1,589	20.0	9.9	5.4	14.4	9.5	13.2	7.8	6.8	3.8	0.8	2.1	4.5	1.8	5.6	35.3	64.2	47.1	45.7
Voxmeter	11–17 Mar 2024	1,002	20.3	9.5	6.4	14.5	9.0	15.0	6.2	7.7	4.5	—	2.4	3.7	0.8	5.3	36.2	63.0	49.4	43.4
Epinion	6–13 Mar 2024	2,152	21.6	8.6	7.1	14.8	10.3	13.7	5.5	8.4	3.7	—	2.3	3.4	—	6.8	37.1	62.1	50.8	41.5
Voxmeter	4–10 Mar 2024	1,002	21.0	10.0	6.8	15.4	10.0	13.7	5.8	6.5	4.0	—	3.2	3.0	0.6	5.6	37.8	61.6	50.1	42.5
Voxmeter	25 Feb–2 Mar 2024	1,000	21.4	9.9	8.0	14.2	8.9	14.4	5.0	6.9	4.6	—	2.5	3.4	0.8	7.0	39.3	59.9	49.6	41.6
Voxmeter	19–25 Feb 2024	1,001	22.2	10.5	7.8	13.9	8.0	14.4	5.0	7.1	4.7	—	1.8	4.2	0.4	7.8	40.5	59.1	49.7	42.1
Voxmeter	12–18 Feb 2024	1,004	22.9	10.0	7.5	13.2	7.4	15.3	4.0	7.6	4.5	—	1.6	4.8	1.2	7.6	40.4	58.4	49.8	41.5
Kantar	7–13 Feb 2024	1,594	21.5	10.0	6.5	13.3	9.5	13.3	5.2	7.9	4.5	0.0	1.9	4.6	1.8	8.2	38.0	61.3	49.1	42.6
Voxmeter	5–11 Feb 2024	1,007	21.5	10.8	6.6	14.0	7.7	15.8	5.0	8.3	3.6	—	1.9	3.7	1.1	5.7	38.9	60.0	49.3	43.0
Voxmeter	29 Jan–5 Feb 2024	1,006	21.1	9.4	5.5	15.3	8.0	15.9	5.8	6.6	4.5	—	2.2	4.4	1.2	5.2	36.0	62.7	49.8	43.5
Epinion	24–31 Jan 2024	2,149	21.6	9.4	5.5	13.1	11.1	14.6	5.2	8.2	3.9	—	1.8	4.5	—	7.0	36.5	62.4	48.6	44.8
Voxmeter	22–28 Jan 2024	1,035	23.7	11.1	6.2	12.3	7.7	13.4	5.3	8.6	4.0	—	2.5	3.9	1.3	10.3	41.0	57.7	51.1	41.4
Voxmeter	14–21 Jan 2024	1,069	22.7	10.0	6.1	13.0	8.2	13.6	5.7	8.3	4.7	—	2.9	3.4	1.4	9.1	38.8	59.8	51.6	40.9
Voxmeter	8–14 Jan 2024	1,016	22.1	11.3	6.8	13.0	8.2	12.1	4.6	8.6	5.5	0.9	2.4	3.6	0.9	9.1	40.2	58.9	51.6	40.7
2022 election result		–	27.50	13.32	9.27	8.30	8.12	7.89	5.51	5.13	3.79	3.67	3.33	2.64	1.54 (Note: Q: 0.90%, K: 0.52%, independents: 0.12%)	14.18	50.09	49.79	48.95	41.65

=== 2023 ===
Polling execution			Parties															Blocs			
Polling firm	Fieldwork date	Sample size	A	V	M	F	Æ	I	C	Ø	B	D	Å	O	Q	Others	Lead	Gov.	Opp.	Red	Blue
Voxmeter	18–22 Dec 2023	1,017	20.1	10.5	5.6	14.2	9.0	12.7	4.9	8.0	5.0	1.8	2.7	4.5	—	1.0	5.9	36.2	62.8	50.0	43.4
Epinion	6–13 Dec 2023	1,652	19.6	8.1	6.1	13.5	11.3	12.1	5.2	8.9	4.7	2.5	2.5	4.5	—	—	3.1	33.8	65.2	49.2	43.7
Voxmeter	13–19 Nov 2023	1,033	20.9	9.0	7.3	13.8	10.9	11.8	4.9	7.5	4.3	2.1	3.0	3.4	—	1.1	7.1	37.2	61.7	49.5	42.1
Epinion	8–15 Nov 2023	2,262	18.2	8.3	6.9	14.6	10.5	13.1	5.7	8.3	4.3	2.8	2.2	3.8	—	—	4.4	33.4	65.3	47.6	44.2
Voxmeter	6–12 Nov 2023	1,036	22.6	9.9	7.7	13.9	10.2	11.7	5.1	8.0	4.2	1.5	1.6	3.2	—	0.4	8.7	40.2	59.4	50.3	41.6
Voxmeter	30 Oct–5 Nov 2023	1,018	23.0	8.8	6.9	13.0	9.0	11.9	5.7	8.6	4.1	2.3	2.1	3.7	—	0.9	10.0	38.7	59.4	50.8	41.4
Kantar Gallup	3 Oct 2023	about 1,800	22.2	9.7	8.6	13.5	8.6	11.2	5.6	7.2	3.6	2.3	1.9	4.1	0.3	—	9.3	40.5	58.3	48.7	41.5
Voxmeter	25 Sep–1 Oct 2023	1,029	22.7	10.3	7.1	12.8	9.1	12.3	5.2	7.5	4.1	2.8	1.9	3.7	—	0.5	9.9	40.1	59.4	49.0	43.4
Epinion	22–29 Sep 2023	2,154	20.4	8.7	7.3	14.4	9.9	11.7	5.1	8.4	4.1	2.7	2.0	4.8	0.0	—	6.0	36.4	63.1	49.3	42.9
Voxmeter	18–24 Sep 2023	1,004	23.3	9.3	8.0	11.7	8.7	13.1	4.9	7.4	4.8	2.9	1.8	3.1	—	1.0	10.2	40.6	58.4	49.0	42.0
Voxmeter	11–17 Sep 2023	1,070	23.6	9.9	7.2	12.5	8.4	12.9	5.0	6.9	4.8	2.9	2.7	3.0	—	0.2	10.7	40.7	59.1	50.5	42.1
YouGov	7–11 Sep 2023	1,053	22.7	7.3	6.5	13.1	9.9	10.0	6.6	7.4	4.1	2.7	2.5	6.5	—	—	9.6	36.5	62.8	48.9	44.9
Voxmeter	28 Aug–3 Sep 2023	1,003	23.9	9.9	9.4	12.4	8.9	10.9	4.9	7.6	4.2	2.1	3.0	2.6	—	0.2	11.5	43.2	56.6	51.1	39.3
Kantar Gallup	16–22 Aug 2023	1,842	22.8	11.3	8.0	12.8	8.9	8.5	7.0	6.5	3.6	2.7	2.6	3.8	0.5	—	10.0	42.1	56.9	46.2	42.2
Epinion	14–23 Aug 2023	1,754	22.9	9.7	7.2	12.3	9.0	10.9	5.4	7.5	4.6	3.1	3.1	3.4	—	0.9	10.6	39.8	59.3	50.4	41.5
Voxmeter	31 Jul–7 Aug 2023	1,002	24.3	9.8	6.8	14.0	8.7	10.6	4.5	7.3	4.3	2.7	2.6	3.5	—	0.9	10.3	40.9	58.2	52.5	39.8
Voxmeter	19–25 Jun 2023	1,002	22.0	10.2	7.3	13.7	9.5	10.4	6.3	7.2	4.3	2.8	2.2	3.4	—	0.7	8.3	39.5	59.8	49.4	42.6
Voxmeter	12–18 Jun 2023	1,005	22.9	10.5	7.5	14.3	8.6	11.2	6.6	6.7	3.6	2.7	2.0	3.2	—	0.2	8.6	40.9	58.9	49.5	42.8
Voxmeter	5–11 Jun 2023	1,040	21.3	10.5	8.2	14.1	9.4	11.3	6.5	6.6	3.8	1.9	2.5	3.4	—	0.5	7.2	40.0	59.5	48.3	43.0
Kantar Gallup	31 May–6 Jun 2023	2,123	21.9	10.5	8.0	13.5	8.7	10.3	6.4	7.0	4.2	1.8	2.0	4.5	0.4	0.5	8.4	40.4	59.3	49.0	42.7
Voxmeter	22–28 May 2023	1,002	22.4	11.2	7.6	13.6	9.2	11.0	5.3	6.8	4.3	2.7	2.6	2.8	—	0.5	8.8	41.2	58.3	49.7	42.2
Voxmeter	15–21 May 2023	1,019	21.5	11.3	6.7	14.6	9.2	10.7	6.1	7.0	4.1	2.4	2.6	3.2	—	0.6	6.9	39.5	59.9	49.8	42.9
Voxmeter	8–14 May 2023	1,021	22.1	9.7	6.0	15.1	10.0	11.9	5.4	6.9	4.3	1.8	2.9	3.0	—	0.9	7.0	37.8	61.3	51.3	41.8
Voxmeter	1–7 May 2023	1,003	21.7	10.3	6.2	15.8	10.4	10.2	5.8	7.1	4.6	1.0	2.3	3.6	—	1.0	5.9	38.2	60.8	51.5	41.3
Voxmeter	24–30 Apr 2023	1,012	21.6	9.4	7.3	14.9	10.8	11.0	5.6	7.1	4.6	1.5	2.7	2.9	—	0.6	6.7	38.3	61.1	50.9	41.2
Epinion	19–26 Apr 2023	2,165	21.1	9.0	6.6	15.3	8.6	12.6	6.0	6.4	4.2	2.4	3.1	4.1	—	0.6	5.8	36.7	63.3	50.1	42.7
Voxmeter	17–23 Apr 2023	1,021	22.8	10.6	8.4	13.6	9.4	9.9	5.2	6.7	4.9	1.7	3.2	2.8	—	0.7	9.2	41.8	57.4	51.2	39.6
Voxmeter	10–17 Apr 2023	1,038	23.4	10.5	8.0	14.1	9.0	10.8	5.5	7.2	4.2	1.5	2.3	2.7	0.4	0.9	9.3	41.9	57.7	51.6	40.0
Gallup	7–13 Apr 2023	1,920	20.7	10.5	8.0	14.6	9.2	10.9	6.6	5.8	3.3	2.3	2.9	3.7	0.6	0.9	6.1	39.2	61.8	47.9	43.8
Voxmeter	3–10 Apr 2023	1,025	22.4	9.4	8.3	15.0	9.4	9.4	6.2	6.7	4.0	2.3	2.5	3.4	0.6	0.4	7.4	40.1	59.5	51.2	40.1
Voxmeter	27 Mar–3 Apr 2023	1,044	22.8	8.8	8.7	13.9	9.4	10.3	6.0	7.1	4.4	2.5	2.4	3.0	0.5	0.2	8.9	40.3	59.5	51.1	40.0
Epinion	22–28 Mar 2023	2,262	20.8	9.1	9.0	13.1	8.9	11.0	5.5	7.6	3.3	2.7	2.2	4.7	0.6	1.5	7.7	38.9	61.1	47.6	41.9
Voxmeter	20–26 Mar 2023	1,000	23.6	9.5	7.4	12.7	8.6	10.5	6.3	7.0	4.0	2.3	3.2	3.9	0.2	0.8	10.9	40.5	58.7	50.7	41.1
Voxmeter	13–19 Mar 2023	1,019	22.2	11.0	8.4	12.7	8.4	11.0	5.9	7.4	4.0	2.8	2.6	3.3	0.2	0.1	9.5	41.6	58.3	49.1	42.4
YouGov	10–13 Mar 2023	1,242	23.0	9.2	5.7	12.7	10.5	9.7	7.5	8.1	3.4	2.0	1.8	6.0	0.2	0.2	10.3	37.9	62.1	49.2	45.1
Voxmeter	6–12 Mar 2023	1,009	21.4	10.5	7.9	13.6	8.3	12.4	5.7	7.0	4.8	2.9	2.3	2.5	0.5	0.2	7.8	39.8	60.0	49.6	42.3
Voxmeter	27 Feb–5 Mar 2023	1,015	18.6	11.9	7.9	14.5	9.3	11.9	5.2	6.6	4.3	4.4	2.2	2.6	0.3	0.3	4.1	38.4	61.3	46.5	45.3
Voxmeter	20–26 Feb 2023	1,002	24.0	10.6	8.7	14.4	8.4	9.6	6.1	5.4	3.0	3.0	2.4	4.1	0.2	0.1	9.6	43.3	56.8	49.4	41.8
Epinion	14–20 Feb 2023	1,823	21.9	9.4	7.5	12.8	9.9	10.3	6.4	7.0	4.0	2.3	3.0	4.5	0.7	0.3	9.1	38.8	60.9	49.4	42.8
Voxmeter	13–19 Feb 2023	1,128	24.8	11.4	7.4	13.1	8.6	10.0	5.6	6.2	3.2	3.1	2.8	3.0	0.5	0.3	11.7	43.6	56.1	50.6	41.7
Voxmeter	6–12 Feb 2023	1,029	22.9	10.0	7.4	14.9	8.2	10.8	6.1	7.0	3.2	3.7	2.5	2.9	0.2	0.2	8.0	40.3	59.5	50.7	41.7
Voxmeter	30 Jan–5 Feb 2023	1,047	22.1	12.1	8.1	14.4	9.0	10.3	5.1	6.3	3.0	3.3	3.1	3.1	0.0	0.1	7.7	42.3	57.6	48.9	42.9
Gallup	27 Jan–2 Feb 2023	1,640	23.1	11.1	8.4	12.8	8.3	11.5	5.4	6.6	3.3	2.6	2.8	3.0	–	–	10.3	42.6	56.3	48.6	41.9
Voxmeter	23–29 Jan 2023	1,004	22.8	11.5	8.0	13.5	8.3	10.6	6.1	6.7	3.8	2.5	2.7	3.0	0.2	0.3	9.3	42.3	57.4	49.7	42.0
Voxmeter	16–22 Jan 2023	1,002	24.1	11.4	7.7	13.5	8.4	10.4	4.9	6.5	3.3	3.1	3.0	3.0	0.5	0.2	10.6	43.2	56.6	50.9	41.2
Voxmeter	9–15 Jan 2023	1,028	26.0	11.5	8.6	11.7	7.0	9.4	5.1	6.5	3.6	3.9	2.8	3.3	0.5	0.1	14.3	46.1	53.8	51.1	40.2
Voxmeter	2–8 Jan 2023	1,017	27.2	10.9	9.1	11.0	7.4	10.3	4.9	6.6	3.5	2.8	3.3	2.6	0.4	0.0	16.2	47.2	52.8	52.0	38.9
2022 election result		–	27.50	13.32	9.27	8.30	8.12	7.89	5.51	5.13	3.79	3.67	3.33	2.64	0.90	0.64 (Note: K: 0.52%, independents: 0.12%)	14.18	50.09	49.79	48.95	41.65

=== 2022 ===
Polling execution			Parties															Blocs			
Polling firm	Fieldwork date	Sample size	A	V	M	F	Æ	I	C	Ø	B	D	Å	O	Q	Others	Lead	Gov.	Opp.	Red	Blue
Voxmeter	19–22 Dec 2022	1,005	27.6	10.5	7.7	10.6	8.7	11.4	5.9	5.7	3.2	3.2	2.6	1.9	0.8	0.2	16.2	45.8	54.0	50.5	41.6
Epinion	12–18 Dec 2022	2,166	27.0	10.6	9.3	10.4	9.4	9.6	4.3	6.5	3.8	3.8	2.4	2.5	0.2	0.2	16.6	46.9	53.0	50.1	40.2
Voxmeter	12–18 Dec 2022	1,003	26.7	11.3	8.8	10.1	8.7	9.3	6.3	6.6	3.2	3.2	3.0	2.5	0.2	0.2	15.4	46.8	53.1	49.8	41.3
Voxmeter	5–11 Dec 2022	1,002	28.7	13.0	7.1	9.0	8.4	9.3	5.3	5.8	3.9	3.9	3.1	2.0	0.4	0.2	15.7	48.8	51.1	50.9	41.9
Voxmeter	28 Nov–4 Dec 2022	1,017	29.3	14.7	6.9	8.5	8.0	9.4	4.7	6.1	3.6	3.3	2.6	2.3	0.4	0.2	14.6	50.9	48.9	50.5	42.4
Gallup	25 Nov–1 Dec 2022	1,561	27.9	14.2	8.1	8.8	7.5	9.0	4.8	5.9	3.3	3.7	3.2	2.9	0.3	0.4	13.7	50.2	49.8	49.4	42.5
Voxmeter	21–27 Nov 2022	1,004	28.0	13.1	8.4	9.3	7.6	8.9	5.5	5.7	3.7	3.5	3.1	2.7	0.3	0.2	14.9	49.5	50.3	50.1	41.3
2022 election result		–	27.50	13.32	9.27	8.30	8.12	7.89	5.51	5.13	3.79	3.67	3.33	2.64	0.90	0.64 (Note: K: 0.52%, independents: 0.12%)	14.18	50.09	49.79	48.95	41.65

== Seat projections ==
90 seats are required for a majority. Parties that are not mentioned in polls are indicated with a — in place of a number. The Moderates are not part of the Red or Blue blocs.

=== 2026 ===
Polling execution			Parties												Blocs			
Polling firm	Fieldwork date	Sample size	A	V	M	F	Æ	I	C	Ø	B	Å	O	H	Gov.	Opp.	Red	Blue
2026 election result		–	38	18	14	20	10	16	13	11	10	5	16	4	70	105	84	77
YouGov	1–18 Mar 2026	4,966	38	16	10	24	11	17	14	11	8	4	18	4	64	115	85	80
Voxmeter	2–8 Feb 2026	1,025	41	19	11	23	16	18	14	11	7	0	11	4	71	104	84	82
Voxmeter	26 Jan–1 Feb 2026	1,001	40	22	9	20	17	18	13	11	9	4	12	0	71	104	84	82
Epinion	20–28 Jan 2026	2,034	39	18	8	23	16	20	13	12	9	4	13	0	65	108	87	80
Voxmeter	19–25 Jan 2026	1,035	42	19	12	23	16	19	12	13	6	0	9	4	73	102	84	79
Megafon	20–22 Jan 2026	1,012	42	19	9	26	12	19	12	14	9	0	13	0	70	105	91	75
Voxmeter	12–18 Jan 2026	1,007	38	19	9	25	18	19	12	11	8	4	12	0	66	109	86	80
Voxmeter	5–11 Jan 2026	1,005	35	19	6	27	18	19	12	13	10	4	12	0	60	115	89	80
2022 election result		–	50	23	16	15	14	14	10	9	7	6	5	—	89	86 (Note: D: 6 seats)	87	72

=== 2025 ===
Polling execution			Parties												Blocs			
Polling firm	Fieldwork date	Sample size	A	V	M	F	Æ	I	C	Ø	B	Å	O	H	Gov.	Opp.	Red	Blue
Voxmeter	1–7 Dec 2025	1,005	33	20	5	28	15	22	12	14	8	0	14	4	58	117	83	87
Voxmeter	24–30 Nov 2025	1,002	34	21	5	26	15	19	12	12	7	4	16	4	60	115	83	87
Voxmeter	17–23 Nov 2025	1,024	35	21	4	23	15	23	13	13	9	0	15	4	60	115	80	91
Voxmeter	10–16 Nov 2025	1,007	35	15	5	21	16	20	13	13	11	4	15	4	58	117	84	86
Voxmeter	3–9 Nov 2025	1,005	38	17	6	22	17	18	14	12	10	0	15	6	61	114	82	87
Voxmeter	27 Oct–2 Nov 2025	1,005	37	18	6	22	14	19	12	12	10	4	17	4	61	114	85	84
Voxmeter	20–26 Oct 2025	1,002	38	19	8	22	17	20	11	12	7	0	17	4	65	120	79	88
Voxmeter	13–19 Oct 2025	1,011	36	21	6	22	16	19	11	13	7	4	16	4	63	120	82	87
Voxmeter	6–12 Oct 2025	1,004	38	19	6	23	17	22	11	11	9	5	16	0	61	114	84	85
Voxmeter	29 Sept–5 Oct 2025	1,031	34	17	8	24	16	23	12	13	8	4	15	0	59	116	84	83
Voxmeter	22–28 Sep 2025	1,006	36	18	6	21	17	21	12	13	8	5	14	4	60	115	83	86
Voxmeter	15–21 Sep 2025	1,014	38	19	5	22	15	22	11	14	6	4	15	4	62	113	84	86
Voxmeter	8–14 Sep 2025	1,006	39	18	5	22	16	23	11	14	6	6	14	0	62	113	88	82
Voxmeter	1–7 Sep 2025	1,000	38	20	6	24	18	21	11	13	7	4	12	0	64	111	87	82
Voxmeter	25–31 Aug 2025	1,001	35	17	6	26	16	24	13	12	8	4	14	0	58	117	85	84
Voxmeter	18–24 Aug 2025	1,004	36	19	6	26	18	21	12	11	9	4	13	0	61	114	86	83
Epinion	13–20 Aug 2025	1,537	34	18	7	28	16	23	11	13	7	4	14	0	63	112	86	82
Voxmeter	11–17 Aug 2025	1,065	39	17	5	23	17	23	13	13	8	5	12	0	61	114	88	82
Voxmeter	23–29 Jun 2025	1,002	40	20	7	23	16	23	11	13	8	0	10	4	67	108	84	84
Voxmeter	16–22 Jun 2025	1,052	38	19	5	24	18	21	11	13	7	5	10	4	62	113	87	83
Voxmeter	9–15 Jun 2025	1,007	40	18	6	23	18	22	11	15	7	6	9	0	64	111	91	78
Voxmeter	2–8 Jun 2025	1,003	43	20	8	22	19	19	11	13	8	5	9	0	69	106	91	78
Epinion	26 May–2 Jun 2025	1,582	39	17	7	26	17	21	9	13	7	5	14	0	63	112	90	77
Voxmeter	19–25 May 2025	1,003	42	19	8	23	15	23	11	12	8	4	6	4	69	106	89	78
Voxmeter	12–18 May 2025	1,001	43	18	6	25	17	24	10	12	8	4	8	0	67	108	92	77
Voxmeter	5–11 May 2025	1,007	42	19	6	23	17	22	11	13	8	5	9	0	67	108	91	78
Voxmeter	28 Apr–4 May 2025	1,003	41	17	7	26	18	24	10	14	9	0	9	0	65	110	90	78
Epinion	22–29 Apr 2025	1,483	41	18	7	24	19	24	10	13	8	4	8	0	66	109	90	79
Voxmeter	21–27 Apr 2025	1,005	40	17	6	25	17	25	11	14	7	4	9	0	63	112	90	79
Voxmeter	14–20 Apr 2025	1,002	41	18	6	22	16	23	9	13	9	4	9	4	65	110	89	80
Voxmeter	7–13 Apr 2025	1,007	41	17	6	25	17	22	11	13	11	5	7	0	64	111	95	74
Voxmeter	31 Mar–6 Apr 2025	1,016	41	18	8	25	16	25	10	11	9	4	8	0	67	108	90	77
Verian	26 Mar–1 Apr 2025	1,641	41	20	7	27	15	24	11	13	7	0	10	0	68	107	88	82
Voxmeter	24–30 Mar 2025	1,076	41	19	6	24	19	23	11	12	8	4	8	0	66	109	89	80
Epinion	19–26 Mar 2025	1,640	41	17	6	27	19	23	10	12	8	4	8	0	64	111	92	77
Voxmeter	17–23 Mar 2025	1,002	43	17	7	23	17	22	13	11	9	4	9	0	67	108	90	78
Voxmeter	10–16 Mar 2025	1,005	41	19	6	23	18	21	12	12	7	4	8	4	66	109	87	82
Voxmeter	3–9 Mar 2025	1,002	42	18	6	26	18	20	12	12	8	4	9	0	66	109	92	77
Verian	26 Feb–4 Mar 2025	1,797	39	20	8	26	16	19	14	12	8	4	9	0	67	108	89	86
Voxmeter	24 Feb–2 Mar 2025	1,012	41	20	6	27	18	22	11	11	7	4	8	0	67	108	90	79
Voxmeter	17–23 Feb 2025	1,013	39	19	6	24	18	23	11	11	8	5	7	4	64	111	87	82
Voxmeter	10–16 Feb 2025	1,002	38	19	7	25	17	22	12	12	8	5	10	0	64	111	88	80
Voxmeter	3–9 Feb 2025	1,028	36	19	7	26	17	21	13	15	8	4	9	0	62	113	89	79
Verian	29 Jan–4 Feb 2025	1,897	42	21	7	27	18	17	13	12	8	0	10	0	70	105	89	86
Voxmeter	27 Jan–2 Feb 2025	1,010	37	17	7	27	18	22	14	13	8	0	8	4	61	114	85	83
Voxmeter	20–26 Jan 2025	1,001	37	19	6	28	21	22	13	13	8	0	8	0	62	113	86	83
Epinion	15–22 Jan 2025	1,635	36	16	8	29	21	21	12	12	7	4	9	0	60	115	88	79
Voxmeter	13–19 Jan 2025	1,014	34	16	6	29	19	24	12	13	9	4	9	0	56	119	89	80
Voxmeter	6–12 Jan 2025	1,039	35	19	7	31	20	22	12	12	9	0	8	—	61	114	87	81
2022 election result		–	50	23	16	15	14	14	10	9	7	6	5	—	89	86	87	72

=== 2024 ===
Polling execution			Parties											Blocs			
Polling firm	Fieldwork date	Sample size	A	V	M	F	Æ	I	C	Ø	B	Å	O	Gov.	Opp.	Red	Blue
Voxmeter	16–23 Dec 2024	1,002	37	18	7	30	19	25	10	13	7	0	9	62	113	87	81
Voxmeter	9–15 Dec 2024	1,032	36	18	6	29	19	22	11	14	9	4	7	60	115	92	77
Verian	4–10 Dec 2024	1,737	35	21	7	30	18	22	9	14	7	0	12	63	112	86	82
Epinion	4–10 Dec 2024	1,590	35	17	6	26	19	24	11	13	9	4	11	58	117	87	82
Voxmeter	2–8 Dec 2024	1,001	34	19	6	31	19	22	10	12	9	5	8	59	116	91	78
Voxmeter	25 Nov–1 Dec 2024	1,017	36	19	8	30	20	22	10	11	7	4	8	63	112	88	79
Voxmeter	18–24 Nov 2024	1,010	33	18	7	32	21	21	11	11	8	5	8	58	117	89	79
Voxmeter	11–17 Nov 2024	1,038	33	18	7	30	19	23	12	12	9	4	8	58	117	88	80
Verian	6–13 Nov 2024	2,035	37	21	8	25	17	21	13	14	6	4	9	66	109	86	81
Voxmeter	4–10 Nov 2024	1,002	34	18	7	29	20	25	9	12	9	5	7	59	116	89	79
Epinion	30 Oct–6 Nov 2024	1,592	34	17	6	29	20	23	12	12	9	4	9	57	118	88	81
Voxmeter	28 Oct–3 Nov 2024	1,249	36	19	6	30	19	23	9	11	8	5	9	61	114	90	79
Voxmeter	21–27 Oct 2024	1,001	37	22	6	27	17	24	11	12	8	4	7	65	110	88	81
Voxmeter	14–21 Oct 2024	1,002	35	20	6	30	18	23	12	13	6	4	8	61	114	88	81
Voxmeter	7–13 Oct 2024	1,005	36	18	8	28	17	24	11	14	7	4	8	62	113	89	78
Voxmeter	23–30 Sep 2024	1,003	39	19	7	27	20	21	11	15	8	0	8	65	110	89	79
Epinion	20–27 Sep 2024	1,614	36	18	7	27	18	23	11	14	7	4	10	61	114	88	80
Voxmeter	16–22 Sep 2024	1,005	37	18	9	28	17	22	11	13	9	4	7	64	111	91	75
Voxmeter	9–15 Sep 2024	1,009	35	18	10	31	17	24	10	15	8	0	7	63	112	89	76
Verian	4–10 Sep 2024	1,467	34	18	7	29	16	24	11	14	10	0	12	59	116	87	81
Voxmeter	2–8 Sep 2024	1,009	37	19	8	29	19	22	11	12	10	0	8	64	111	88	79
Voxmeter	26 Aug–1 Sep 2024	1,009	39	16	10	25	17	21	12	13	9	4	9	65	110	90	75
Voxmeter	19–25 Aug 2024	1,004	40	18	11	27	17	20	12	14	8	0	8	69	106	89	75
Voxmeter	12–18 Aug 2024	1,003	39	19	12	26	17	18	10	14	9	4	7	70	105	92	71
Epinion	7–14 Aug 2024	1,972	35	16	11	29	21	23	12	12	7	0	9	62	113	83	81
Voxmeter	5–11 Aug 2024	1,001	38	17	12	27	17	20	11	14	10	0	9	67	108	89	74
Voxmeter	14–23 Jun 2024	1,007	33	17	12	34	16	23	11	11	10	0	8	62	113	88	75
Voxmeter	10–16 Jun 2024	1,002	34	18	11	30	16	24	11	13	8	4	6	63	112	89	75
Verian	10–12 Jun 2024	1,288	31	18	11	32	19	24	12	11	9	0	8	60	115	83	81
Voxmeter	3–9 Jun 2024	1,009	35	16	10	27	15	25	11	14	9	6	7	61	114	91	74
Epinion	28 May–3 Jun 2024	1,653	35	14	12	27	19	23	11	14	7	5	8	61	114	88	75
Voxmeter	27 May–2 Jun 2024	1,001	37	14	11	24	17	28	8	14	8	5	9	62	113	88	76
Voxmeter	20–26 May 2024	1,009	36	13	13	23	17	27	10	15	10	4	7	62	113	88	74
Verian	8–14 May 2024	1,565	34	16	12	27	16	26	10	14	6	4	10	62	113	85	78
Voxmeter	13–19 May 2024	1,003	37	14	12	24	18	28	8	13	9	5	7	63	112	88	75
Epinion	8–14 May 2024	1,502	32	15	8	26	22	28	11	13	6	4	10	55	120	81	86
Voxmeter	6–12 May 2024	1,004	36	14	10	24	17	28	10	16	7	5	8	60	115	88	77
Voxmeter	29 Apr–5 May 2024	1,007	38	15	10	23	16	28	10	16	7	5	8	63	112	89	76
Epinion	23–29 Apr 2024	1,938	35	11	10	26	21	29	10	12	8	4	9	56	119	90	73
Voxmeter	22–28 Apr 2024	1,002	38	14	11	24	17	27	8	14	10	5	7	63	112	91	73
Voxmeter	15–21 Apr 2024	1,003	39	16	14	25	19	25	8	12	8	4	5	69	106	88	73
Voxmeter	8–14 Apr 2024	1,001	41	12	12	24	17	25	9	14	9	4	5	68	107	92	71
Voxmeter	1–7 Apr 2024	1,007	39	16	11	27	18	22	10	13	9	4	6	66	109	92	72
Voxmeter	25–31 Mar 2024	1,004	37	17	12	25	17	24	11	14	8	4	6	66	109	88	75
Voxmeter	18–25 Mar 2024	1,002	35	16	10	27	18	25	11	15	8	4	6	61	114	89	76
Voxmeter	11–17 Mar 2024	1,002	36	17	11	26	16	26	11	14	8	4	6	64	111	88	76
Epinion	6–13 Mar 2024	2,152	39	15	12	26	18	24	10	15	6	4	6	56	119	90	73
Voxmeter	4–10 Mar 2024	1,002	37	18	12	27	18	24	10	11	7	6	5	67	108	88	75
Voxmeter	25 Feb–2 Mar 2024	1,000	38	18	14	25	16	25	9	12	8	4	6	70	105	87	74
Voxmeter	19–25 Feb 2024	1,001	40	19	14	25	14	26	9	13	8	0	7	73	102	86	75
Voxmeter	12–18 Feb 2024	1,004	41	18	13	24	13	28	7	14	8	0	9	72	103	87	75
Voxmeter	5–11 Feb 2024	1,007	39	19	12	25	14	29	9	15	6	0	7	70	105	85	78
Voxmeter	29 Jan–5 Feb 2024	1,006	37	17	10	27	14	28	10	12	8	4	8	64	111	88	77
Epinion	24–31 Jan 2024	2,149	39	17	10	24	20	26	9	15	7	4	8	66	109	85	80
Voxmeter	22–28 Jan 2024	1,035	42	20	11	22	14	24	9	15	7	4	7	73	102	90	74
Voxmeter	14–21 Jan 2024	1,069	40	18	11	23	15	24	10	15	8	5	6	69	106	91	73
Voxmeter	8–14 Jan 2024	1,016	39	20	12	23	15	22	8	15	10	4	7	71	104	91	72
2022 election result		–	50	23	16	15	14	14	10	9	7	6	5	89	86	87	72

=== 2023 ===
Polling execution			Parties													Blocs			
Polling firm	Fieldwork date	Sample size	A	V	M	F	Æ	I	C	Ø	B	D	Å	O	Q	Gov.	Opp.	Red	Blue
Voxmeter	18–22 Dec 2023	1,017	36	19	10	26	16	23	9	14	9	0	5	8	—	65	110	90	75
Voxmeter	11–17 Dec 2023	1,015	37	20	10	23	15	21	9	13	9	5	5	8	—	67	108	87	78
Epinion	6–13 Dec 2023	1,652	35	14	11	24	20	22	9	16	8	4	4	8	—	60	115	87	77
Voxmeter	4–10 Dec 2023	1,020	36	20	11	24	17	22	8	14	8	4	4	7	—	67	108	86	78
Voxmeter	27 Nov–3 Dec 2023	1,018	35	18	13	24	16	21	9	14	8	5	5	7	—	70	115	87	74
Voxmeter	13–19 Nov 2023	1,033	38	18	14	23	18	20	8	14	7	5	5	5	—	66	109	87	75
Epinion	8–15 Nov 2023	2,262	33	15	12	26	19	23	10	15	7	5	4	6	—	60	115	85	78
Voxmeter	6–12 Nov 2023	1,036	37	16	13	24	19	21	9	13	8	4	5	6	—	73	102	89	72
Voxmeter	30 Oct–5 Nov 2023	1,018	41	18	14	25	18	21	9	15	8	0	0	6	—	69	106	90	73
Voxmeter	23–29 Oct 2023	1,028	39	17	12	24	14	22	11	15	6	5	4	6	—	68	107	88	75
Voxmeter	16–22 Oct 2023	1,003	40	16	14	23	15	22	10	13	6	4	5	7	—	70	105	87	74
Voxmeter	9–15 Oct 2023	1,006	37	15	14	24	16	23	8	14	6	6	5	7	—	66	109	86	75
Voxmeter	2–8 Oct 2023	1,005	40	16	15	23	15	22	9	12	7	6	4	6	—	71	104	86	74
Voxmeter	25 Sep–1 Oct 2023	1,029	41	19	13	23	16	22	9	13	7	5	0	7	—	73	102	84	78
Epinion	22–29 Sep 2023	2,154	36	15	13	26	17	21	9	15	7	4	4	8	—	64	111	88	74
Voxmeter	18–24 Sep 2023	1,004	42	17	14	21	16	24	9	13	9	5	0	5	—	73	102	85	76
Voxmeter	11–17 Sep 2023	1,070	41	17	13	22	15	23	9	12	8	5	5	5	—	71	104	88	74
Voxmeter	4–10 Sep 2023	1,056	44	16	15	20	15	21	8	12	8	4	6	6	—	75	110	90	70
Voxmeter	28 Aug–3 Sep 2023	1,003	42	17	16	22	16	19	9	13	7	4	5	5	—	75	100	89	70
Voxmeter	21–27 Aug 2023	1,007	42	19	15	23	15	19	8	13	7	4	5	5	—	76	99	90	70
Epinion	14–23 Aug 2023	1,754	42	17	13	22	16	17	9	13	8	5	5	6	—	72	103	90	72
Voxmeter	14–20 Aug 2023	1,003	40	22	14	25	14	19	8	12	6	5	5	5	—	76	99	88	73
Voxmeter	7–13 Aug 2023	1,007	41	20	12	24	16	17	9	14	7	5	5	5	—	73	102	91	72
Voxmeter	31 Jul–6 Aug 2023	1,002	43	17	12	25	15	19	8	13	8	5	4	6	—	72	103	93	70
Voxmeter	19–25 Jun 2023	1,002	39	18	13	24	17	18	11	13	7	5	4	6	—	70	105	87	75
Voxmeter	12–18 Jun 2023	1,005	41	18	13	25	15	20	11	12	6	5	4	5	—	72	103	88	74
Epinion	6–13 Jun 2023	1,671	37	17	12	24	16	21	11	12	7	5	5	8	—	66	109	85	78
Voxmeter	5–11 Jun 2023	1,040	38	19	15	25	17	20	12	12	7	0	4	6	—	72	103	86	74
Voxmeter	22–28 May 2023	1,002	39	20	13	24	16	19	9	12	8	5	5	5	—	72	103	88	74
Voxmeter	15–21 May 2023	1,019	38	20	12	26	16	19	11	12	7	4	4	6	—	70	105	87	76
Voxmeter	8–14 May 2023	1,021	40	18	11	27	18	21	10	12	8	0	5	5	—	69	106	92	72
Voxmeter	1–7 May 2023	1,003	39	18	11	28	19	18	10	13	8	0	4	7	—	68	107	92	72
Voxmeter	24–30 Apr 2023	1,012	38	17	13	27	19	20	10	13	8	0	5	5	—	68	107	91	71
Epinion	19–26 Apr 2023	2,165	38	16	12	27	15	23	10	11	7	4	5	7	—	66	109	88	75
Voxmeter	17–23 Apr 2023	1,021	41	19	15	24	17	18	9	12	9	0	6	5	—	75	100	92	68
Voxmeter	10–17 Apr 2023	1,038	42	19	14	25	16	19	10	13	8	0	4	5	0	75	100	92	68
Voxmeter	3–10 Apr 2023	1,025	39	17	15	26	17	17	11	12	7	4	4	6	0	71	104	88	72
Voxmeter	27 Mar–3 Apr 2023	1,044	40	16	15	24	17	18	11	13	8	4	4	5	0	71	104	89	71
Epinion	22–28 Mar 2023	2,262	38	16	16	24	16	20	10	13	6	4	4	8	0	70	105	85	74
Voxmeter	20–26 Mar 2023	1,000	42	17	13	22	15	19	11	12	7	4	6	7	0	72	103	89	73
Voxmeter	13–19 Mar 2023	1,019	39	19	15	22	15	19	10	13	7	5	5	6	0	73	102	86	74
Voxmeter	6–12 Mar 2023	1,009	38	19	14	24	15	22	10	12	8	5	4	4	0	71	104	86	75
Voxmeter	27 Feb–5 Mar 2023	1,015	33	21	14	25	16	21	9	12	7	8	4	5	0	68	107	81	80
Voxmeter	20–26 Feb 2023	1,002	42	19	15	25	15	17	11	10	5	5	4	7	0	76	99	86	74
Epinion	14–20 Feb 2023	1,823	39	17	13	23	18	18	11	12	7	4	5	8	0	69	101	86	76
Voxmeter	13–19 Feb 2023	1,128	44	20	13	23	15	18	10	11	6	5	5	5	0	77	98	89	73
Voxmeter	6–12 Feb 2023	1,029	40	18	13	26	14	19	11	12	6	7	4	5	0	71	104	88	74
Voxmeter	30 Jan–5 Feb 2023	1,047	39	21	14	25	16	18	9	11	5	6	5	6	0	74	101	85	76
Voxmeter	23–29 Jan 2023	1,004	40	20	14	24	14	19	11	12	7	4	5	5	0	74	101	88	73
Voxmeter	16–22 Jan 2023	1,002	43	20	14	24	15	18	9	11	6	5	5	5	0	77	98	89	72
Voxmeter	9–15 Jan 2023	1,028	46	20	15	21	12	17	9	11	6	7	5	6	0	81	94	89	71
Voxmeter	2–8 Jan 2023	1,017	48	19	16	19	13	18	9	12	6	5	6	4	0	83	92	91	68
2022 election result		–	50	23	16	15	14	14	10	9	7	6	6	5	0	89	86	87	72

=== 2022 ===
Polling execution			Parties													Blocs			
Polling firm	Fieldwork date	Sample size	A	V	M	F	Æ	I	C	Ø	B	D	Å	O	Q	Gov.	Opp.	Red	Blue
Voxmeter	19–22 Dec 2022	1,005	50	19	14	19	16	20	10	10	6	6	5	0	0	83	92	90	71
Epinion	12–18 Dec 2022	2,166	49	19	16	19	17	17	7	11	6	6	4	4	0	84	91	87	70
Voxmeter	5–11 Dec 2022	1,002	51	23	12	16	15	16	9	10	7	7	5	4	0	86	89	86	74
Voxmeter	28 Nov–4 Dec 2022	1,017	52	26	12	15	14	16	8	11	6	6	5	4	0	90	85	87	74
Voxmeter	21–27 Nov 2022	1,004	49	23	15	16	13	16	10	10	7	6	5	5	0	87	88	85	73
2022 election result		–	50	23	16	15	14	14	10	9	7	6	6	5	0	89	86	87	72

== Regional polls ==
=== Bornholm Constituency ===
Polling execution			Parties														Seat projection	
Polling firm	Fieldwork date	Sample size	A	V	M	F	Æ	I	C	Ø	B	Å	O	H	Others	Lead	A	V
Norstat	24 Feb–9 Mar 2026	1,000	34.0	19.0	2.6	11.8	3.3	4.8	3.3	5.1	1.8	0.7	11.2	0.3	2.1	15.0	1	1
Norstat	5–20 Feb 2025	1,000	34.1	15.3	2.3	9.3	5.0	6.1	7.2	7.6	2.2	1.8	6.0	0.3	—	18.8	2	0
Jysk Analyse	6–11 Sep 2023	1,004	31.8	12.6	7.2	9.9	7.0	6.8	4.0	7.3	1.9	1.3	6.6	—	2.7	19.2	2	0
2022 election result		–	35.3	18.7	6.1	6.4	6.4	3.6	3.7	5.2	1.0	2.7	6.3	—	4.4	16.6	1	1

=== Faroe Islands ===
Polling execution			Parties							Seat projection	
Polling firm	Fieldwork date	Sample size	B	C	E	A	H	F	Lead	B	C
spyr.fo	22 Mar 2026	700	24.5	40.0	17.3	16.0	2.2	—	15.5	1	1
spyr.fo	12 Mar 2026	700	28.0	37.7	14.4	14.9	2.3	2.8	9.7	1	1
2022 election result		–	30.2	28.2	18.2	15.5	4.5	3.4	2.0	1	1

== See also ==
- Opinion polling for the 2019 Danish general election
- Opinion polling for the 2022 Danish general election
