= FUBAR (disambiguation) =

FUBAR is a military acronym for "fucked up beyond all recognition".

FUBAR or fubar may also refer to:

- FUBAR (film), a 2002 Canadian mockumentary film
  - Fubar: The Album, the film's soundtrack album
  - FUBAR 2, the 2010 sequel to the film
  - Fubar Age of Computer, a 2017 television series
- Fubar Films, an Irish film and television production company based in Dublin
- FUBAR (TV series), a 2023 Netflix television series starring Arnold Schwarzenegger
- F.U.B.A.R.: America's Right-Wing Nightmare, a 2006 book by Sam Seder and Stephen Sherrill
- FUBAR, former name of Taiwanese rock band Deca Joins

== See also ==
- Foobar
- Foo (disambiguation)
