= Fu River =

The name Fu River may refer to several rivers in China:

- Fu River (Sichuan), or Fujiang (涪江), in Sichuan and Chongqing, a tributary of the Jialing River (Yangtze Basin)
- Fu River (Jiangxi), or Fuhe (撫河 or 抚河), in Jiangxi, a tributary of the Poyang Lake (Yangtze Basin)
- Fushui River (富水), in Hubei, a tributary of the Yangtze River
