= Youth of the Danish People's Party =

Youth of the Danish People's Party Dansk Folkepartis Ungdom
- Leader: Thomas Kastrup Christensen
- Founded: 1995
- Headquarters: Christiansborg 1 1218 Copenhagen K
- Ideology: National conservatism Euroscepticism
- Mother party: Danish People's Party
- European affiliation: Patriots.eu
- Nordic affiliation: Nordisk Friheds Ungdom (NFU)
- Website: www.dfungdom.dk

Dansk Folkepartis Ungdom (DFU; English: Youth of the Danish People's Party) is the youth wing of the Danish People's Party.

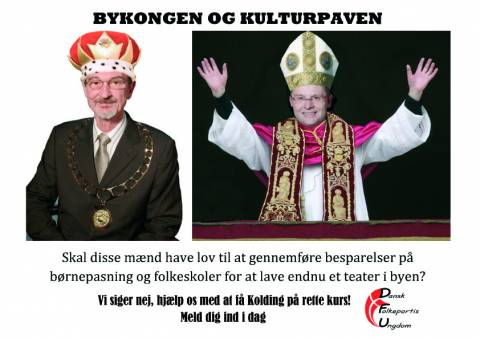
DFU

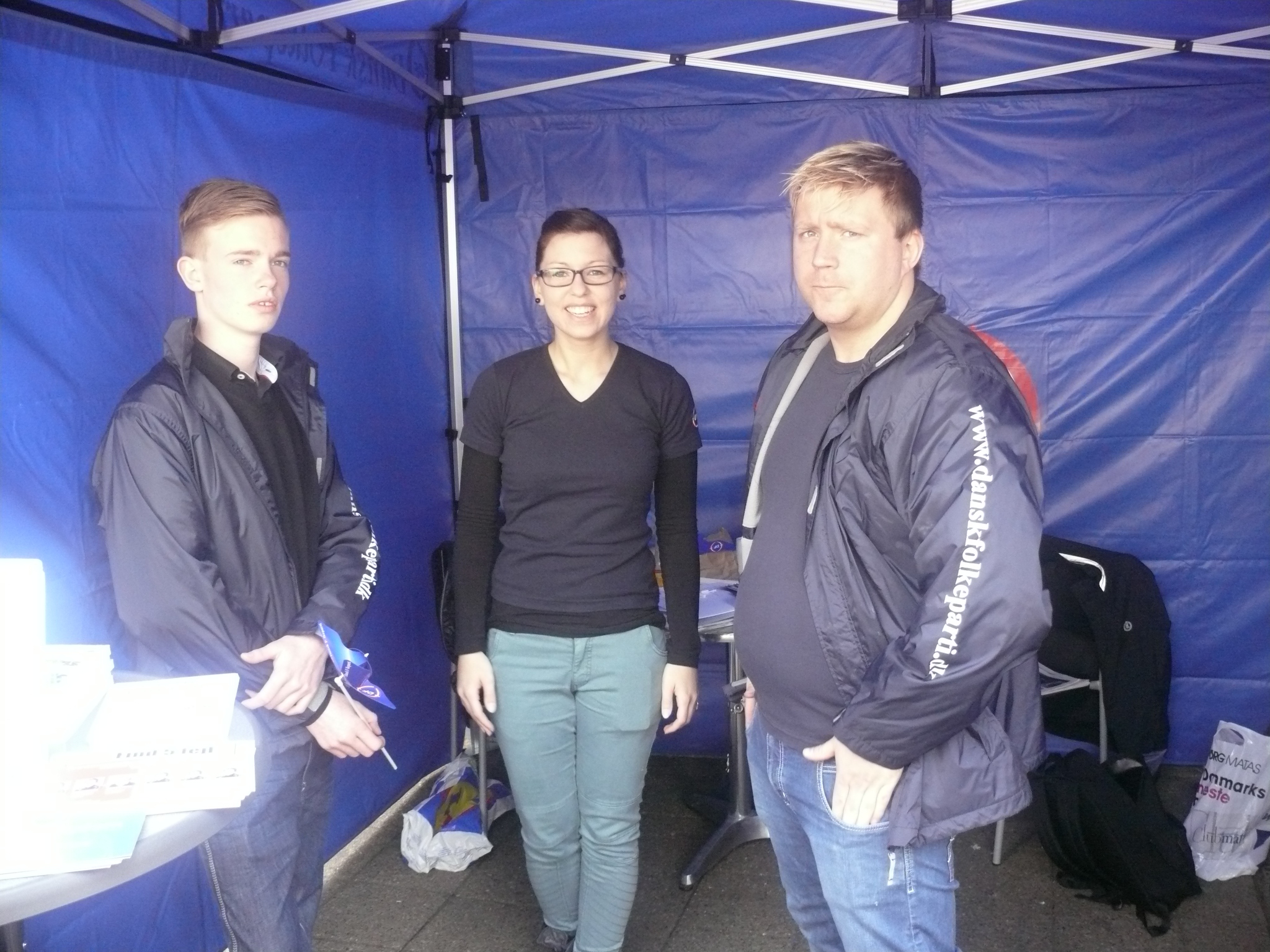
DFU in 2012
