= Phu =

Phu may refer to:

== Places ==
- PHU (Polish-Hungarian Union), personal union between Poland and Hungary in 14th century.

== People ==
=== Given name ===
- Phu Dorjee (died 1987), first Indian to climb Mount Everest without oxygen
- Phu Dorjee Sherpa (died 1969), first Nepali to climb Mount Everest
- Phu Lam (1961–2014), perpetrator in the 2014 Edmonton killings
- Trần Phú (1904–1931), Vietnamese communist revolutionary
- Trương Phụ (1375–1449), general of the Ming Dynasty of China

=== Surname ===
- Charles Phu, architect and set designer
- Phu Pwint Khaing (born 1987), Burmese soccer player
- Sunthorn Phu (1786–1855), Siamese poet

== Linguistics ==
- Phuan language (ISO 639 language code: phu)
- Phu Thai language, the Phu language of Thais
- Nar Phu language, the Nar and the Phu languages

== Other uses ==
- Public Health Units of Ontario, Canada
- Pannon Air Service (ICAO airline code: PHU)

== See also ==
- Phoo
- Foo (disambiguation)
- Fu (disambiguation)
