= Follow-up =

Follow-up may refer to:

- Kepler Follow-up Program, a program to follow up possible observations of planets by the Kepler spacecraft
- Followup-To, a kind of internet crossposting
- Follow-up, a patient's revisit in ambulatory care
- Follow-up, a stage in software inspection

== See also ==
- Fagan inspection#Follow-up
- Follow-Up and Arrangement Committee, a former alliance of Iraqi opposition groups
- Lost to follow-up
- Sequel
- Spin-off (media)
