= Fu, Sweden =

Village in Dalarna, Sweden

Coordinates: 60°57′50″N 14°42′30″E

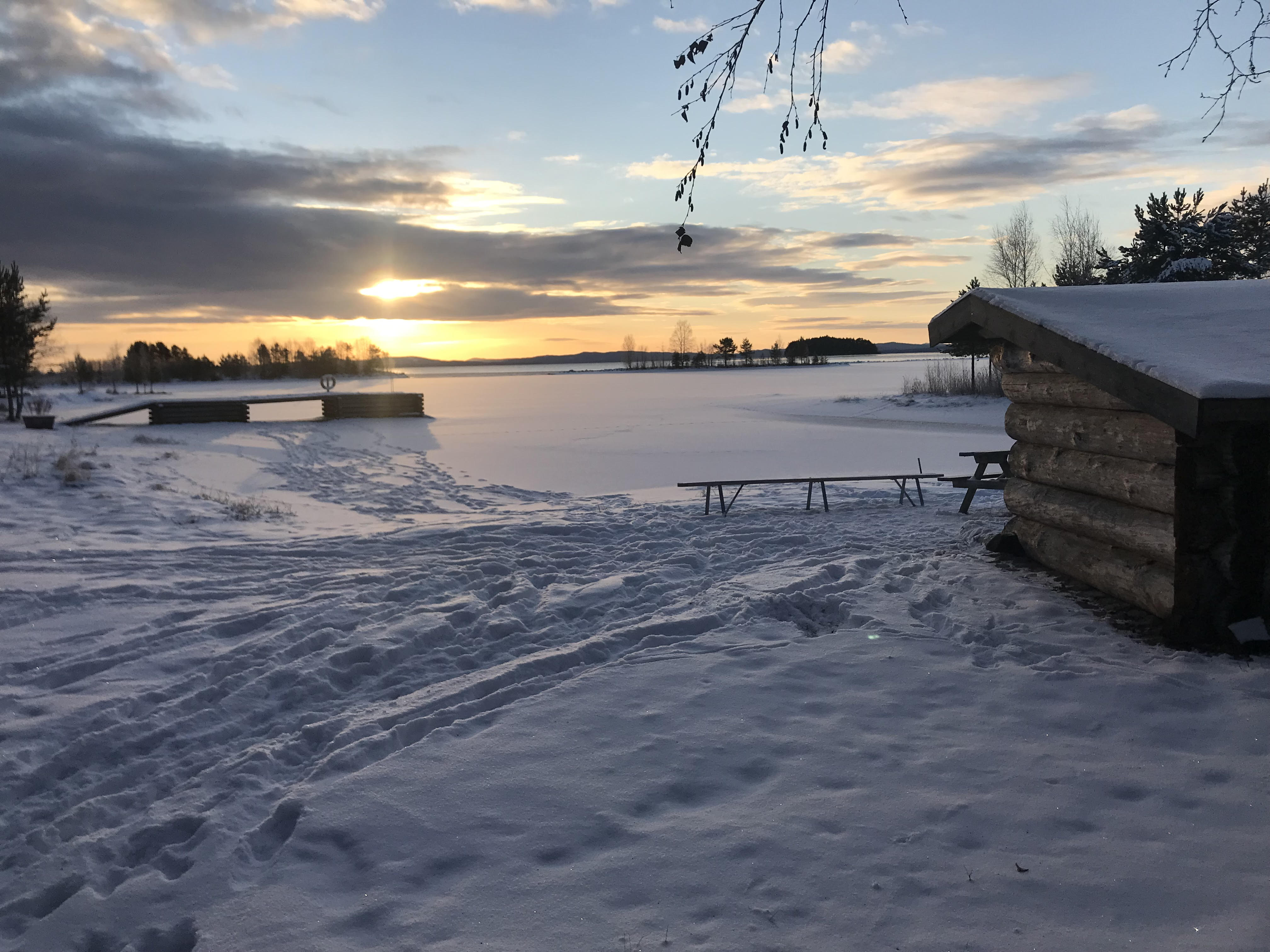
Fu during winter with a view over the lake Siljan.

Fu is a small village in Dalarna, Sweden. The village is located by the national road Riksväg 70, about 10 kilometres southeast of the town Mora. Approximately 50 people live in Fu and the neighboring village of Fudal.

The Dala Line, a railway that stretches from Uppsala to Mora, passes close to the village. There used to be a small railway station in Fu, but it closed in the 1960s.

The stream Fuån flows into the lake Siljan just outside of the village.

== Name ==
According to the Swedish place-name researcher Bror Lindén, Fu is a shortened form of Fuån, which in turn derives from an Old Norse word for rottenness, fúi.
