= Adeline Foo =

Singaporean short story and children's book writer

Adeline Foo is a Singaporean short story writer and children's book writer.

== Career ==
Foo is a graduate of New York University Tisch School of the Arts, Asia. She started writing picture books in 2006. To date, she has written 16 books, 12 picture books. Her bestselling work is The Diary of Amos Lee which was published on 2009, it is written in simple and lucid language. She received the inaugural First Time Writers & Illustrators Publishing Initiative Award given by the Media Development Authority of Singapore and the National Book Development Council of Singapore. She has received support to publish 13 picture books for early readers. Three of her books have been adapted into animation shorts, with a fourth new series turned into a TV show on the MediaCorp kids' channel, okto.

Foo spent half of her 15-year career in corporate public relations, and the other half in advertising agency work.

She is married and a mother of three children.

== Awards and recognition ==
Foo's The Diary of Amos Lee: I Sit, I Write, I Flush! won the inaugural Red Dot award for “Best Junior Fiction” presented by the International School Libraries Network (Singapore) in 2009. The Diary of Amos Lee: I'm Twelve, I'm Tough, I Tweet! won second runner-up at the Popular Readers’ Choice Award in 2011. Foo's The Diary of Amos Lee series, published by Epigram Books has been sold to India, China, Indonesia, Slovakia and Czech Republic. The book has also been adapted into a television show in 2012 for which there have been spin-offs of characters in the series. A game that was mentioned in one of the books has also been turned into a game application for iPhone and iPad. As of 2013, the series has sold nearly 200,000 copies worldwide.

== Publications ==
- The Diary of Amos Lee: I Sit, I Write, I Flush (2009)
- The Diary of Amos Lee: Girls, Guts and Glory (2009)
- The Diary of Amos Lee: I'm Twelve, I'm Tough, I Tweet (2010)
- Whoopie Lee 1: Almost Famous (2011)
- Ben's Friends from the Rainforest (2006)
- Monsters on the Wall (2009)
- It Took More Than Earthworms to Bring Grandpa Home
- Beaded Slippers (2008)
- The Thing Under My Bed (2009)
- Thomas Titans: Men Among Boys (2013)
- The Kitchen God (2008)
- Lost in the Secret Garden (2007)
- Secret Hoarder (2007)
- The Midnight Tree (2008)
- The Amulet (2008)
- Georgette's Mooncakes (2009)
- Monsters on the Wall (2009)
- Nu Nu: The Ring-Necked Monster (2009)
- Chilli Padi (2008)
