= Foo Lake =

Lake in Sawyer County, Wisconsin, USA

- Location within Wisconsin Location within the United States
- Location: Chequamegon National Forest, Sawyer County, Wisconsin, US
- Coordinates: 46.0606907°N 91.1286663°W
- Basin countries: United States
- Surface area: 4 acres (1.6 ha)
- Max. depth: 15 ft (4.6 m)
- Surface elevation: 1,398 ft (426 m)

Foo Lake is a 4 acre lake in the Chequamegon National Forest in Sawyer County, Wisconsin. According to the Wisconsin Department of Natural Resources it contains no sport fish. It is a lake formed by seepage from the surrounding swamp and the bottom is muck.
