= Fixture unit =

Unit of measurement

In plumbing, a Fixture Unit (FU) or Drain Fixture Unit (DFU) is "a unit of measure, based on the rate of discharge, time of operation and frequency of use of a fixture, that expresses the hydraulic load imposed by that fixture on the sanitary plumbing installation". A Fixture Unit is not a flow rate unit but a design factor. A fixture unit is equal to 1 cubic foot (0.028 m^{3}) of water drained in a 1 1/4 inches (32 mm) diameter pipe over one minute. One cubic foot of water is roughly 7.48 US gallons (28.3 L; 6.23 imp gal). A Fixture Unit is used in plumbing design for both water supply and waste water.

Different fixtures have different flow requirements. In order to determine the required size of pipe, an arbitrary unit is used for pipe sizing which takes into account the likelihood that all the fixtures will not be used at the same time. This is called "fixture unit" (FU). The relationship between gallons per minute (gpm) and fixture unit is not constant, but varies with the number of fixture units. For example, 1000 FU is equivalent to 220 US gallons per minute (0.014 m^{3}/s) while 2000 FU represents only 330 US gallons per minute (0.021 m^{3}/s), about 1.5 times the flow rate.

Fixture unit values can be determined using charts from the International Plumbing Code or similar codes in local jurisdictions.

There are situations where a design provides for more FUs being discharged than being supplied. This occurs in situations where liquids may infiltrate or are added to a draining system, such as might happen in a large sports venue. Examples of how this could occur include rain water infiltration.
