= Organisation and structure of the English Defence League =

Academics characterise the English Defence League as a social movement, and more specifically as a new social movement, and a social movement organisation. In its organisational structure, the EDL has been characterised by academic observers as a direct action or street-based protest movement. It is a pressure group rather than a political party. During fieldwork with the group, Joel Busher found that many EDL members stressed the idea that the group was not a political organisation, instead presenting it as a single-issue protest group or street movement. Busher noted that these individuals were aware of the tactical advantages of doing so, believing that in presenting itself in this manner it could avoid associations both with older far-right groups like the NF and BNP and with accusations of racism. Like several other counter-jihad groups operating in Western countries, the EDL describes itself as a human rights organisation, although this characterisation is not widely accepted among the British public.

== Leadership and branches ==
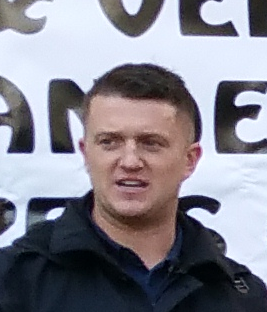
Robinson was the EDL's co-leader during its period of major growth and national attention.

Until October 2013, the EDL was based in Luton. The EDL's structure was informal and lacking in any strict hierarchy, while it also lacked any clear leadership. In its early years, the EDL was controlled by a leadership group referred to as the "team" and which were generally secretive about their operations; they often remained anonymous or used pseudonyms. As of June 2010, this group consisted of six men, including Robinson. In the summer of 2010, the EDL went through a formal restructuring to deal with Robinson's absence. The 2010 reforms included the introduction of a code of conduct which commanded members to respect and obey the leadership, to act in a unified manner, and to be aware that any comments that they made to the press would be taken as formal EDL statements. Till October 2013, the EDL was led by Robinson and Carroll as co-leaders, supported by the regional organisers of the 19 regional divisions. EDL members were expected to take an oath of allegiance to the organisation's leadership. After that duo left the group, it was reorganised around a committee leadership which was headed by a rotating chair.

The EDL lacked a central regulatory structure through which to impose a uniform approach to strategy or maintain ideological purity throughout. It operated through a loose network of local divisions, each of which had a good deal of autonomy. Winlow, Hall, and Treadwell found that most members liked the group's "messy structure and imprecise goals" and did not want to be part of a highly structured organisation under firm leadership. The EDL divided into at least ninety different divisions, some of which are based on locality and others on specialist groups. These have included a women's division, Jewish division, Sikh division, Hindu division, and LGBT division. For a brief period it also had a disabled division, as well as a green division, and a soldiers' division. These groups are designed to raise the profile of a particular social group within the EDL itself and helping the organisation to draw in recruits from sectors of society that would normally avoid membership in a far-right grouping, such as ethnic minorities and LGBT people. In its early years it also formed a youth division, the English Defence Youth, which was led by Joel Titus; after Titus received a criminally-related anti-social behaviour order (CRASBO), preventing his further involvement in the EDL, the youth division became largely inactive.

The local groups were organised into a series of nine areas: North West, North East, East Midlands, West Midlands, East Anglia, South West, South East, South East Central, and Greater London. From the summer of 2010 onward, each of these had its own regional organiser. The EDL was heavily reliant on these grassroots networks and the initiative of local and regional leaders. Some of the local divisions covered whole cities or counties while in other cases there could be more than one division representing a single postcode, in part due to personal disputes.

Branches typically held their meeting in pubs with sympathetic owners, which are referred to as "HQs". Pilkington observed that these meetings always features alcohol consumption. Such divisional meetings were infrequent and often poorly attended. They were typically unstructured, lacking any formal agenda or the taking of minutes, and were mainly an opportunity for divisional organisers to inform members of their decisions. Sometimes guest speakers were also invited to address the audience. As well as these divisional meetings, the EDL divisions also held "meet and greet" events to attract new membership. There was no system of official membership recognised through membership cards, and no membership fees. The EDL accepted donations and local divisions sought to raise funds by selling merchandise and holding fundraising events such as barbeques.

=== Demonstrations ===
EDL activism has taken place across a range of more or less public and managed spaces. These have included official street demonstrations of varying size, unofficial or 'flash' demonstrations, petitions against mosques, leafleting campaigns, attempted boycotts of restaurants selling halal food, organisational social media pages, personal social media pages of activists, memorials for symbolically significant events and various charity fundraisers.

— Political scientist Joel Busher

The EDL's primary activity have been street protests, which have regularly attracted media attention. Its demonstrations came in three forms: national demonstrations that attracted activists from across the country, local demonstrations featuring largely the local EDL division, and the flash demonstrations held without giving the authorities prior warning of the event. Members attending such flash demonstrations are only informed of the place and time of the protest several hours before it is due to take place. This tactic arose following attempts by the Home Office to ban various organised EDL demonstrations. Such protests included a picket outside of the family home of Member of the European Parliament Sajjad Karim, a Muslim, in July 2011.

The EDL claims that it disavows violence, and that it wants its protests to be peaceful, blaming violence on anti-fascist counter-protesters. Despite this, many of those who attend its rallies seek the thrill of violent confrontation, describing the pleasure and adrenalin rush they receive from it as a motivating factor in their attendance at the demonstrations. Some also described violent clashes as being the best way of drawing media attention to their demonstrations and their cause. Copsey argued that EDL demonstrations sought to deliberately provoke a violent confrontation from Muslim communities, which in turn would spur the government to take forceful action against British Muslims. The use of aggressive street rallies has a longer history among the British far-right. In the 1930s, the British Union of Fascists marched through areas with high Jewish populations to intimidate and provoke them, while in the 1970s the National Front employed similar tactics in areas with large non-white communities, an approach also used in the 1980s and 1990s by the British National Party till being abandoned after 1999.

In 2011, Bartlett and Littler stated their view that the EDL's largest demonstration contained between 2000 and 3000 protesters. Copsey noted that the "overwhelming majority" of attendees at EDL demonstrations are "young, white, working-class males". Although EDL demonstrations have included people of colour, in general they remain overwhelmingly white. At events, many members sought to have their photograph taken with the few Sikhs who attended, thus seeking to bolster the idea that they were not personally racist. Copsey suggested that many Sikhs who were sympathetic to the EDL were nevertheless put off from attending rallies due to an awareness that many of the EDL's white members would not be able to differentiate between Sikhs and Muslims. The events were also numerically dominated by men, with relatively few women attending. At demonstrations, speeches typically focus on the perceived threat of Islamification, but also raise issues like the dangers of political correctness and the errors of the political left. During demonstrations, the EDL have regularly been met with opposition from anti-fascist groups like Unite Against Fascism, and sometimes also from Islamic groups. The clashes between the rival groups often resulted in violence and public disorder, with the police seeking to keep the two apart.

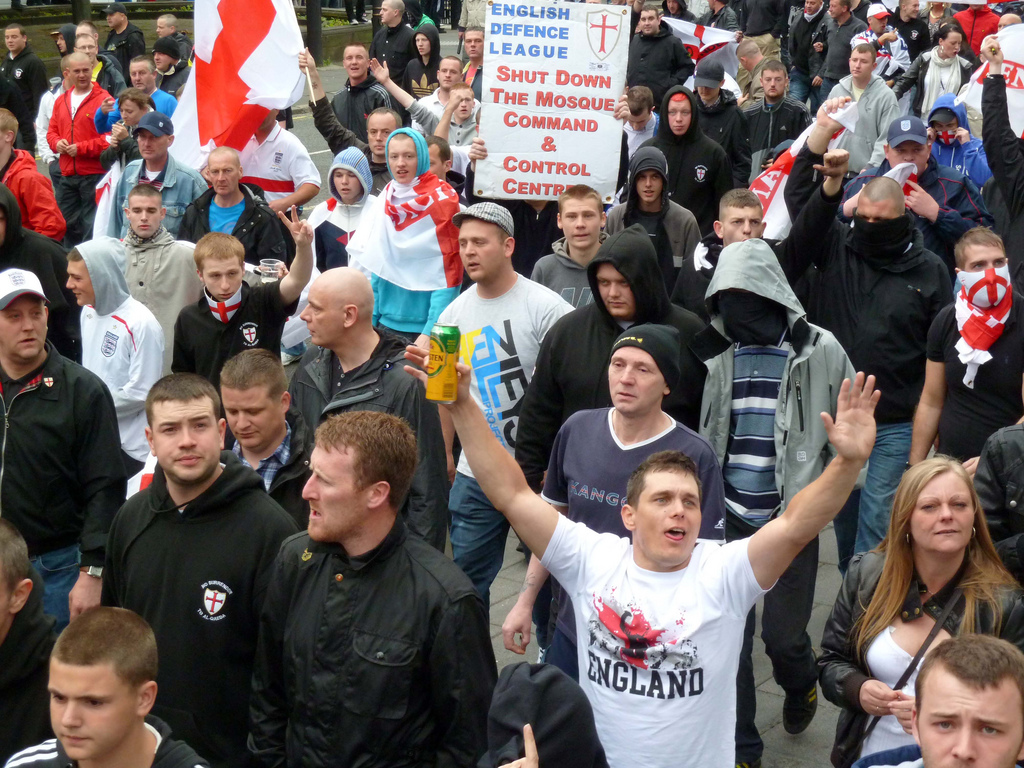
Street protest organised by the EDL in Newcastle, England (The placard reads "Shut down the Mosque Command and Control Centre.")

To reach national events, local EDL groups often hired coaches to transport them to their destination; en route, they often displayed EDL flags from the coach windows. The coach provided a space in which these members engaged in singing, banter, story-telling, and practical jokes. As well as being protests, these demonstrations served as social events for EDL members, helping to forge a sense of solidarity and of the EDL as "one big family". At demonstrations, many members—including those who may be too young to legally drink alcohol—consume large quantities of alcohol. Many of these events begin and/or end at a pub, which is used as a meeting place. Some members also take cocaine prior to attending demonstrations.

EDL demonstrations were typified by continuous chanting with aggressive slogans aimed at Muslims. Pilkington divided these chants into three types: those which were anti-Islam, those which were patriotic in referencing an English identity, and those which were identity affirming in making specific reference to the EDL itself. Examples of the first category included "Muslim bombers off our streets", "No surrender to the Taliban", "Protect women, no to sharia", "If you wear a burqa you're a cunt", "You can stick your fucking Islam up your arse", "You can shove your fucking Allah up your arse", "Allah is a paedo", and "Allah, Allah, who the fuck is Allah?". Examples of the second category include "I'm England till I die", "We want our country back", and "Whose streets? Our streets!", while the third included the chant "E... E... EDL". When confronting counter-protesters from the UAF and other groups, EDL members often chanted "You're not English anymore". Alongside chants, the EDL often employed songs, including the UK national anthem "God Save the Queen", patriotic songs like "Keep St George in my Heart, Keep me English"—sung to the tune of the hymn "Give Me Joy in My Heart"—and the anti-Islam themed "There were Ten Muslim Bombers in the Air".

At the demonstrations, EDL members often displayed the English flag of St George as well as the British Union Jack; the Israeli and LGBT Pride flags were also often in attendance. As with various older far-right street organisations like the Italian Squadristi or German Sturmabteilung, the EDL had a "street uniform" that members wore in the form of wristbands, t-shirts, and hoodies bearing the group's logo. Many members also wore masks decorated with either the EDL logo or the St George's cross. Some also wore pig face masks or masks of figures whom they wished to ridicule, such as the Salafi jihadist leader Osama bin Laden. The use of the hoodie has symbolic connections with anti-social behaviour and the stereotype of the chav; it was thus selected for its intimidating atmosphere and as a reassertion of working-class status. In wearing such a uniform, the EDL seek to construct a unified political identity. Wearing this material helps to cement individual's loyalty to the group, particularly as they are likely to experience disapproval from other members of the public while wearing it. Reflecting the place of football hooligans in the EDL, some of its male members wore expensive designer clothing to its rallies, most notably Fred Perry polo shirts, jeans or combat trousers, and Adidas trainers. A number of attendees also display EDL-themed tattoos.

Lager, cocaine, a bit of shouting and singing, the possibility of a punch-up, surrounded by friends and like-minded others - there was an air of adventure to proceedings, and some found all of this very attractive.

— Simon Winlow, Steve Hall, and James Treadwell on EDL demonstrations

The police and local authorities initially allowed most EDL rallies to take place and did not often request banning orders. In October 2010, West Yorkshire Police successfully requested a government ban on the EDL holding a rally in Bradford, fearing that it would spark violent racial tensions akin to those which had taken place in 2001. In October 2010, the Home Secretary Theresa May granted Leicester Police's request to ban a planned EDL march in that city. By September 2011, over 600 arrests had been made in connection with EDL demonstrations and the policing costs were estimated to have exceeded £10 million. In some cases, the majority of those arrested during a demonstration have been from the EDL; on other instances the majority of those arrested have been from groups protesting against the EDL. After the group's August 2009 rally in Birmingham for example, in which it first reached national attention, a number of young Asian counter-protesters attacked several unrelated white youths they found in the city, leading the police to pursue the counter-protesters. Through her ethnographic fieldwork within the EDL, Pilkington found that more members felt that the group's tactics would be ineffective than deemed them effective; some even regarded them as counterproductive due to the presence of members who were drunk or who appeared idiotic by displaying the flag upside-down or placards with misspelled words. Although some EDL members expressed reservations about the violent tactics adopted by others, this was not considered sufficient to stop many of them from returning to further events.

==== Mobilising on local issues ====
In various cases, the EDL mobilised around localised tensions between Islamic and non-Muslim communities. These were often organised by local divisions rather than by the group's national leadership. After a group of inebriated Somali women carried out a racist assault against a white woman, Rhea Page, in Leicester in June 2010, the EDL organised a protest rally in the city, attributing the attack to the supremacist attitude cultivated by Islam among its followers. When, in the Hyde area of Greater Manchester, a man called Daniel Stringer-Prince was assaulted by Asian youths, the EDL again organised a demonstration in that area against the Stringer-Price family's wishes. The EDL blamed the attack on Muslims, although the religious background of the youths had not been ascertained by police. In April 2011, the group held demonstrations in Blackburn in response to a number of hit and run incidents where Muslim drivers had hit non-Muslims; again, the EDL disregarded requests by the victims' families not to politicise the events.

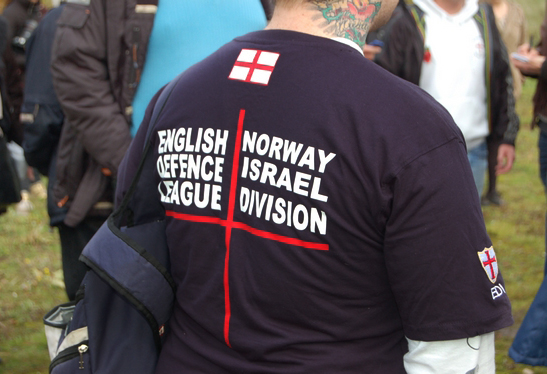
Branded EDL clothing listing the group's links with other organisations abroad.

In spring 2011, the EDL launched a nationwide campaign titled "No New Mosques", which built upon earlier campaigns against mosque construction organised by various local divisions. When a mosque was due to be built in West Bridgford, an EDL organiser for the Nottingham area, Christopher Payne, and three associates placed a severed pig's head on a pole at the site, while the slogan "No mosque here EDL Notts" was spray-painted on the adjacent pavement. In April 2010, the group amassed a demonstration of 3000 supporters in Dudley to protest the construction of a new mosque, an issue that had already attracted local opposition. Prior to the event, a cross-party group of local councillors—including members of the Labour Party, Liberal Democrats, Conservative Party, and UK Independence Party—issued a joint letter to the local press calling on the EDL to abandon its plans because of the detrimental impact they would have on community relations. Two months later, a group of EDL members occupied the roof of the abandoned building on the site of the proposed mosque, displaying a banner saying "No to the burka" and expressing intentions to play the Islamic call to prayer from there five times a day to alert locals to the noise pollution they would suffer when the mosque was built. Police swiftly removed the demonstrators. Dudley Council subsequently announced its intention to try to prevent further EDL demonstrations in the town, noting that the group's activities had cost the local council over £1 million.

The EDL was aware that its demonstrations, which are often met by protests from anti-fascist groups, prove costly for local authorities. The Dudley Metropolitan Borough Council for instance stated that the EDL protest in Dudley had forced the council to spend over £1 million of tax-payers money. To deal with an EDL protest in Leicester, the Leicestershire Police Force had to put on its largest operation in 25 years, bringing in 2000 police officers to manage the demonstration. The EDL used this leverage to pressurise local councils into agreeing to some of its demands; in 2010 it issued a letter stating that any local councils that held Winter-themed festivities rather than explicitly Christmas-themed ones could "have their town/city visited by the English Defence League throughout the following year".

=== Violence ===
Video of damage being caused to a restaurant in Leicester. A supporter of the English Defence League was later convicted for his involvement in the attack, and admitted causing criminal damage worth £1500.

Copsey noted that "it is hard to escape the conclusion that, on the ground, the EDL is a violent organisation." In various cases, EDL demonstrators have damaged Asian-owned businesses and property; in October 2011, EDL members stormed and ransacked an Ahmadiyya Islamic bookstore in Sandwell, and in August 2011 an EDL member was convicted for vandalising a mosque. Demonstrations have also led to physical attacks on Asians themselves. Not all targets of EDL violence have been Muslim; in a July 2010 demonstration in Dudley, EDL members attacked a Hindu temple. It is unclear whether they mistook it for a mosque or whether it reflected broader racist attitudes among the demonstrators extending beyond Islamophobia.

In other instances, EDL members have sought to disrupt the meetings of opponents; in September 2010 they disrupted a UAF meeting in Leicester, and later that month around twenty to thirty EDL activists attacked a meeting of the far-left Socialist Workers Party in Newcastle-upon-Tyne. In June 2011, EDL members attacked an anti-fascist concert in Yorkshire. EDL members also targeted left-wing bookshops and trade union buildings, and members have been jailed for attacking staff at office buildings which had hosted anti-EDL meetings. The EDL have also targeted demonstrators from the anti-capitalist Occupy movement; in November 2011, 179 EDL members were arrested near St Paul's Cathedral in central London for repeatedly threatening members of Occupy London. It cited its targeting of these because "Trotskyists, Communists and left‐liberals have systematically and opportunistically supported the very Islamofascists the EDL is against." Journalists that have covered EDL marches have received death threats; for instance, journalist Jason N. Parkinson from The Guardian wrote about receiving a death threat by email from an EDL organiser, as well as death threats sent to Marc Vallée, a fellow journalist.

Meadowcroft and Morrow argued that the opportunities that EDL rallies offered to engage in violence attracted many football hooligans to join the organisation; the fact that participants saw themselves as engaging in violence for a cause may have given them greater personal satisfaction. These individuals may have found a decreasing number of opportunities to engage in violence at football matches themselves, due to greater use of banning orders targeting known hooligans, a more effective police presence, and increasing ticket prices that had becoming prohibitively high for those on low incomes. Treadwell and Garland interviewed EDL members who had engaged in violence both independently and at demonstrations. One described how, at a protest, he attacked an Asian counter demonstrator: "[I] hit this Paki in the face and he just looked so shocked. So I hit him again and that put him down, then we gave him a fucking good kicking." This EDL member added that he felt "proud afterwards. It made me feel like I'd made a stand."

Treadwell and Garland recorded accounts from various EDL members where they had carried out acts of racist violence on occasions outside those of EDL demonstrations. They for instance described the account of an 18 year old man from a White British working-class background who was a member of a local football firm and who reported that when drunk, he and two friends came upon "a pyjama wearing Paki kid" aged about 20. Robbie and his friends attacked the Asian youth, pushing him to the floor and kicking him repeatedly in the face. When questioned why he did this, Robbie explained that "I guess I was pissed, but really, he was a Paki Muslim youth, he just deserved it". He further explaining that a group of British Asian youth had similarly physically assaulted him when he was a school pupil, with his injuries necessitating hospitalisation. Meadowcroft and Meadow thus suggested that among the EDL, "violence against the perceived enemies of England is legitimised and glorified and enhances the self-worth of the group members taking a stand against those enemies." Treadwell and Garland similarly reported that those EDL members engaging in violence repeatedly presented it as a heroic act.

=== Online activism ===
The EDL established a significant online presence through which it spread its ideology and sought to mobilise supporters to attend its events. The EDL had an official website, but also made heavy use of social media platforms like Facebook and YouTube through which to promote its material. In doing so, Copsey referred to the EDL as "a child of the Facebook revolution", noting that the website was "a critical forum" for the EDL in promoting its views. In making use of social media, the EDL sought to bypass the mainstream media, which it regarded as being biased against it. These social media platforms are moderated by members of the EDL hierarchy, but these moderators do not appear to remove posts by supporters which advocated hatred and violence towards Muslims while blocking users who criticise the EDL and its ideology. The use of Facebook also allowed the group to build momentum and expectancy among their members ahead of public events. The EDL gained a total of 100,000 followers on Facebook, after which the Facebook corporation shut down the group's profile on the website.

Distinguishing itself from political parties, the EDL did not produce leaflets expressing any political program, nor did it print a magazine or newsletter. On the EDL News section of its website it produced articles, commentary, and information on forthcoming events and campaigns, which were then linked to throughout its social media. A study of these articles looking at those produced up to February 2012 found that, of the 117 publicly available articles, 86 discussed Islam or Muslims. Of these, 55.8% discussed extremism, 33.7% discussed terrorism, 31.4% discussed other violence, 24.4% discussed segregationary tendencies, 20.9% discussed supremacism, 20.9% discussed misogyny, and 18.6% described child grooming.

The EDL also used its website as a venue through which to sell its branded merchandise, which included hoodies, t-shirts, caps, pin badges, and face masks. Following internal allegations that EDL members were taking the money from this for themselves rather than using it for the organisation, the EDL pulled merchandise from its website in September 2010. It has also sold its merchandise on the auction website eBay. The EDL has also used the internet and in particular social media to broadcast their activities, such as the placing of severed pig heads outside mosques, the burning of copies of the Qur'an, or footage from demonstrations.

=== International and domestic links ===
Despite its many unique features, the EDL is nonetheless representative of a wider political change that has swept across Europe over the past fifteen years. The combination of a deeply anti‐Muslim political agenda and populist ultrapatriotism, powered by grass‐roots critiques of mainstream politics, has been a core component of the 'new far right' in Europe. Unsurprisingly, the EDL has tried to develop connections with other 'new far right' groups on the Continent, while also cultivating links with populist right wing American figures too.

— Historian of the far right Paul Jackson

As part of the international counter-jihad movement, the EDL formed links with various ideologically similar groups internationally, particularly elsewhere in Europe and in the United States. These have included sectors of the Tea Party movement in the United States. It was affiliated with the U.S.-based Stop Islamization of America run by Pamela Geller and Robert Spencer. Geller who served as the EDL's bridge to the Tea Party movement, but later distanced herself from it, claiming that the EDL contained neo-Nazi elements. When Moore was head of the EDL's Jewish Division, she established links with a far right Jewish American group, the Jewish Task Force. In September 2010, EDL representatives joined demonstrations in New York City's Lower Manhattan to protest against the construction of the "Ground Zero Mosque", and in 2012 attended the "Stop Islamization of Nations" conference, again in New York City. In October 2010, American Tea Party activist Rabbi Nachum Shifren travelled to England to speak at a rally. In his speech, he called Muslims "dogs" and told the EDL that "history will be recorded that on this day, read by our children for eternity, one group lit the spark to liberate us from the oppressors of our two governments and the leftist, fifth column, quisling press, and that it was the EDL which started the liberation of England from evil."

EDL members sometimes attended other events abroad; a small contingent travelled to Berlin in April 2010 to attend a rally in support of Geert Wilders—a right-wing populist politician who had been charged for comparing Islam to Nazism—outside the Dutch Embassy organised by the Citizens' Movement Pax Europa. In June 2010 two EDL representatives attended the Counter-Jihad 2010 conference held by the anti-Muslim International Civil Liberties Alliance in Zürich. In October 2010, Robinson and other EDL members travelled to Amsterdam to protest outside Wilders' trial—although Wilders himself stated that he had no personal contact with the EDL—and it was here that Robinson announced the intention to form a "European Friendship Initiative" with the German, Dutch, and French Defence Leagues. In April 2011 Robinson and other EDL representatives attended a small rally in Lyon, France, alongside the French far-right group Bloc Identitaire; various participants, including Robinson, were arrested. In June 2011, it sent representatives to a counter-jihadist conference organised by Pax Europa in Stuttgart.

It has partnered with the Welsh Defence League, Scottish Defence League, and Ulster Defence League, none of which had the same success as their English counterpart. The Scottish Defence League retained secret links with the BNP, although in Scotland, it produced particularly difficult to bridge sectarian divisions between rival football firms under the same banner. Sectarianism was also a major issue for the Ulster Defence League, which decided against holding any demonstrations in Northern Ireland itself. The Welsh Defence League faced divisions between its contingent from Swansea, some of whom were former members of Combat 18, and the Casuals United-contingent from Cardiff. After a BBC Wales investigation into the group revealed that a number of its members had neo-Nazi beliefs, in 2011 it was shut down and replaced by the Welsh Casuals.

The Canadian Jewish Defense League held a demonstration in support of the EDL, a move criticised by the Canadian Jewish Congress. The EDL has established links to the Danish Defence League. The latter has established 10 chapters within its first year of operation. However recent attempts to establish a presence in Denmark and the Netherlands have failed to attract support and were respectively described as "a humiliation" and as "a damp squib". The Norwegian Defence League (NDL) is a sister organisation of the EDL. There are strong connections between the two organisations, and the leadership of the EDL is also actively involved in the leadership of NDL. Members of the NDL have on several occasions travelled to England to participate in EDL protests.

The English Volunteer Force is a small right-wing street protest movement based in the United Kingdom, which Joe Mulhall considers to be an English Defence League splinter group. Created by John Sheridan and Jason Lock in July 2012, the group calls for the halting of all Muslim immigration, prohibitions on the building of mosques and the sale of halal meat, the rejection of multiculturalism, and a rejection of what they term the 'Islamification' of Great Britain. The group plans to "Unite the Right". The group held its first demonstration in Birmingham in January 2013 which passed peacefully.

== Notes ==
=== References ===
- Aked, Hilary (2017). "Islamophobia, Counter-extremism and the Counterjihad Movement". In Narzanin Massoumi; Tom Mills; David Miller (eds.). What is Islamophobia? Racism, Social Movements and the State. London: Pluto Press. pp. 163–185. ISBN 978-0-7453-9957-7.
- Alessio, Dominic; Meredith, Kristen (2014). "Blackshirts for the Twenty–First Century? Fascism and the English Defence League". Social Identities. 20 (1): 104–118. doi:10.1080/13504630.2013.843058. S2CID 143518291.
- Allen, Chris (2011). "Opposing Islamification or Promoting Islamophobia? Understanding the English Defence League". Patterns of Prejudice. 45 (4): 279–294. doi:10.1080/0031322X.2011.585014. S2CID 144767126.
- Allen, Chris (2013). "Between Critical and Uncritical Understandings: A Case Study Analyzing the Claims of Islamophobia Made in the Context of the Proposed 'Super-Mosque' in Dudley, England". Societies. 3 (2): 186–203. doi:10.3390/soc3020186.
- Bartlett, Jamie; Littler, Mark (2011). Inside the EDL: Populist Politics in a Digital Age (PDF) (Report). London: Demos. Archived from the original (PDF) on 2017-04-27.
- Braouezec, Kevin (2016). "Identifying Common Patterns of Discourse and Strategy among the New Extremist Movements in Europe: The Case of the English Defence League and the Bloc Identitaire". Journal of Intercultural Studies. 37 (6): 637–648. doi:10.1080/07256868.2016.1235023. S2CID 152122560.
- Brindle, Andrew (2016). "Cancer has Nothing on Islam: A Study of Discourses by Group Elite and Supporters of the English Defence League". Critical Discourse Studies. 13 (4): 444–459. doi:10.1080/17405904.2016.1169196. S2CID 147455201.
- Busher, Joel (2018). "Why Even Misleading Identity Claims Matter: The Evolution of the English Defence League". Political Studies. 66 (2): 323–338. doi:10.1177/0032321717720378. S2CID 149419383.
- Cleland, Jamie; Anderson, Chris; Aldridge-Deacon, Jack (2017). "Islamophobia, War and Non-Muslims as Victims: An Analysis of Online Discourse on an English Defence League Message Board". Ethnic and Racial Studies. 41 (9): 1541–1557. doi:10.1080/01419870.2017.1287927. S2CID 151743851.
- Copsey, Nigel (2010). The English Defence League: Challenging our Country and our Values of Social Inclusion, Fairness and Equality (Report). London: Faith Matters.
- Elliott, Andrew B. R. (2017). Medievalism, Politics and Mass Media: Appropriating the Middle Ages in the Twenty-First Century. Medievalism Volume 10. Woodbridge: Boydell. ISBN 978-1-84384-463-1.
- Garland, Jon; Treadwell, James (2010). "'No Surrender to the Taliban': Football Hooliganism, Islamophobia and the Rise of the English Defence League" (PDF). Papers from the British Criminology Conference. 10: 19–35.
- Goodwin, Matthew (2013). The Roots of Extremism: The English Defence League and the Counter-Jihad Challenge (PDF) (Report). London: Chatham House.
- Goodwin, Matthew J.; Cutts, David; Janta-Lipinski, Laurence (2016). "Economic Losers, Protestors, Islamophobes or Xenophobes? Predicting Public Support for a Counter-Jihad Movement". Political Studies. 64 (1): 4–26. doi:10.1111/1467-9248.12159. S2CID 145753701.
- Jackson, Paul (2011). The EDL: Britain's 'New Far Right' Social Movement (Report). Northampton: University of Northampton.
- Kassimeris, George; Jackson, Leonie (2015). "The Ideology and Discourse of the English Defence League: 'Not Racist, Not Violent, Just No Longer Silent'" (PDF). The British Journal of Politics and International Relations. 17: 171–188. doi:10.1111/1467-856X.12036. S2CID 143140361.
- Lambert, Robert (2013). "Anti-Muslim Prejudice in the UK: Extremist Nationalist Involvement and Influence". In Max Taylor; P. M. Currie; Donald Holbrook (eds.). Extreme Right Wing Political Violence and Terrorism. London: Bloomsbury Publishing. pp. 31–63. ISBN 978-1441140876.
- Meadowcroft, John; Morrow, Elizabeth A. (2017). "Violence, Self-Worth, Solidarity and Stigma: How a Dissident, Far-Right Group Solves the Collective Action Problem" (PDF). Political Studies. 65 (2): 373–390. doi:10.1177/0032321716651654. S2CID 148096449.
- Oaten, Alexander (2014). "The Cult of the Victim: An Analysis of the Collective Identity of the English Defence League". Patterns of Prejudice. 48 (4): 331–349. doi:10.1080/0031322X.2014.950454. S2CID 144256716.
- Pilkington, Hilary (2016). Loud and Proud: Passion and Politics in the English Defence League. Manchester: Manchester University Press. ISBN 978-1-7849-9259-0.
- Pilkington, Hilary (2017). "'EDL angels stand beside their men… not behind them': The Politics of Gender and Sexuality in an Anti-Islam(ist) Movement". Gender and Education. 29 (2): 238–257. doi:10.1080/09540253.2016.1237622. S2CID 151702107.
- Richards, Julian (2013). "Reactive Community Mobilization in Europe: The Case of the English Defence League". Behavioral Sciences of Terrorism and Political Aggression. 5 (3): 177–193. doi:10.1080/19434472.2011.575624. S2CID 144517677.
- Romdenh-Romluc, Komarine (2016). "Hermeneutical Injustice: Bloodsports and the English Defence League" (PDF). Social Epistemology. 30 (5–6): 592–610. doi:10.1080/02691728.2016.1172363. S2CID 147127981.
- Treadwell, James; Garland, Jon (2011). "Masculinity, Marginalization and Violence: A Case Study of the English Defence League". The British Journal of Criminology. 51 (4): 621–634. doi:10.1093/bjc/azr027. hdl:2381/10708. JSTOR 23639102.
- Trilling, Daniel (2012). Bloody Nasty People: The Rise of Britain's Far Right. London: Verso. ISBN 978-1-84467-959-1.
- Winlow, Simon; Hall, Steve; Treadwell, James (2017). The Rise of the Right: English Nationalism and the Transformation of Working-Class Politics. Bristol: Policy Press. ISBN 978-1447328483.

=== Further reading ===
- Busher, Joel (2013). "Grassroots Activism in the English Defence League: Discourse and Public (Dis)Order". In Max Taylor; P. M. Currie; Donald Holbrook (eds.). Extreme Right Wing Political Violence and Terrorism. London: Bloomsbury Publishing. pp. 65–84. ISBN 978-1441140876.
- Busher, Joel (2015). The Making of Anti-Muslim Protest: Grassroots Activism in the English Defence League. London: Routledge. ISBN 978-0415502672.
- Meleagrou-Hitchens, Alexander; Brun, Hans (2013). A Neo-Nationalist Network: The English Defence League and Europe's Counter-Jihad Movement (PDF) (Report). London: The International Centre for the Study of Radicalism and Political Violence.
- Treadwell, J. (2014). "Controlling the New Far Right on the Streets: Policing the English Defence League in Policy and Praxis". In J. Garland; N. Chakraborti (eds.). Responding to Hate Crime: The Case for Connecting Policy and Research. Bristol: Policy Press. pp. 127–139.
