= Elisabeth Sabaditsch-Wolff =

Austrian diplomat and activist (born 1971)

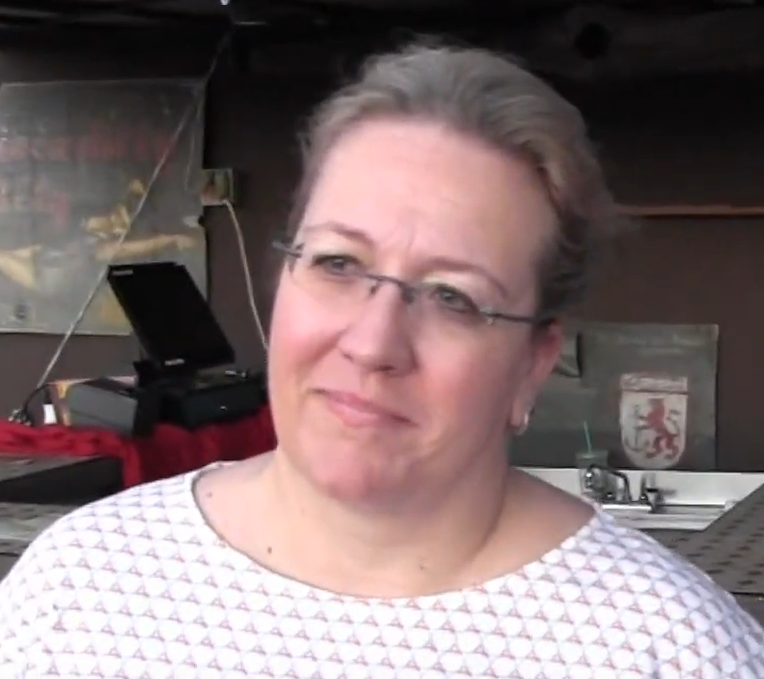
- Sabaditsch-Wolff in 2017
- Born: 1971 (age 54–55)
- Occupation: Counter-jihad activist
- Known for: E.S. v. Austria
- Website: truthwasmycrime.com

Elisabeth Sabaditsch-Wolff (born 1971) is an Austrian counter-jihad activist, and human rights and free speech advocate. She was the applicant of the hate speech appeal E.S. v. Austria, brought before the European Court of Human Rights, after having been convicted of the crime of Herabwürdigung religiöser Lehren (in English: "disparaging religious doctrines" or "mocking religious teachings"). Before she became involved in the counter-jihad movement, she held positions at the Austrian embassies in Kuwait and Libya, and in the Austrian ministry of foreign affairs.

== Biography ==
=== Background ===
The daughter of an Austrian diplomat, she says her interest in Islam came after "having been exposed to Islam from early childhood" and being "confronted with life under the Sharia". She spent much of her life in Muslim countries, first in Iran until the Islamic Revolution in 1979. Her family thereafter returned to Austria, before moving to Chicago, where she completed most of her schooling. She worked for the Austrian embassy in Kuwait at the time of the Iraqi invasion of Kuwait in 1990. She moved back to Austria, before again moving to Kuwait, and later went to work in Libya in 2000. She returned to Austria in 2001 after the September 11 attacks, and had earned a master's degree in diplomatic and strategic studies by 2006. She was approached by the Freedom Party of Austria in 2007 to develop a seminar on Islam, which she taught for two years.

=== Hate speech case ===
In 2009, an undercover journalist from News magazine infiltrated one of her seminars and recorded it, which led to her being charged with hate speech. She was convicted by a Viennese court for "disparaging religious doctrines" in 2011, due to having described the Islamic prophet Muhammad as a pedophile. The verdict was seconded by the Supreme Court of Austria in 2014. She appealed the conviction to the European Court of Human Rights, which in 2018 ruled her speech to not be covered by freedom of speech, although she had made the assertion based on the Islamic texts describing Muhammad's consummation of his marriage with his 9-year-old wife Aisha when he was 54 years old. According to Bruce Bawer, a search for mentions about the case on the internet, described by William Kilpatrick as a "pivotal event in modern European jurisprudence" that "placed the principles of sharia above the right to freedom of expression", failed to find a single mention of the original appeals verdict in any newspaper in the Western world. The case was covered by US-based online outlets such as FrontPage Magazine, Jihad Watch, the Center for Security Policy and Gatestone Institute, and made her a cause célèbre in the counter-jihad movement.

=== Other activities ===
Sabaditsch-Wolff has been active in the Citizens' Movement Pax Europa, the International Civil Liberties Alliance, the Viennese Association of Academics and ACT for America. In this capacity she has been part of a delegation that has worked to "counter Islam" at the Organization for Security and Cooperation in Europe (OSCE). She participated in all of the annual international counter-jihad conferences held from 2007 to 2013, and has been featured extensively on the counter-jihad blog Gates of Vienna under the section "Elisabeth's Voice".

Sabaditsch-Wolff being interviewed alongside cartoonist Bosch Fawstin in 2017

She has received support in conservative circles in the United States, and appeared at the Conservative Political Action Conference (CPAC) in a panel organized by the American Freedom Defense Initiative in 2010. She was also part of a Freedom Party of Austria delegation led by Heinz-Christian Strache that visited Israel the same year, and she spoke in Israel alongside Geert Wilders at the invitation of former MK Eliezer Cohen. In 2011, she posed for photographs together with Donald Trump and Frank Gaffney at the launch of the United West in Florida. In 2013, Republican Representatives Louie Gohmert, Michele Bachmann, Robert Pittenger and Steve King travelled to Austria to give their support to Sabaditsch-Wolff. She was herself invited to meet with Kansas Secretary of State and Trump advisor Kris Kobach in 2017, and spoke at a pro-Trump rally in Denver, Colorado the same year. In 2016, she was knighted by the Knights of Malta. She has been interviewed regarding her legal case by Jeanine Pirro, and collaborated with Katie Hopkins as part of "Katie and The Wolff".

In 2019, she published her book The Truth is No Defense, a memoir about her legal case and her life in Muslim countries. The book included "expert analyses" by Robert Spencer, Clare M. Lopez, Stephen Coughlin, Christian Zeitz, Henrik R. Clausen and Christine Brim. An updated and revised version of the book, titled Truth Was My Crime: A Life Fighting for Freedom was published in 2023.

== Bibliography ==
- The Truth Is No Defense. New English Review Press. 2019. ISBN 9781943003303.
- Truth Was My Crime: A Life Fighting for Freedom. Amazon. 2023. ISBN 9798854860260.
