= Mordechai Kedar =

Israeli scholar (born 1952)

- מרדכי קידר
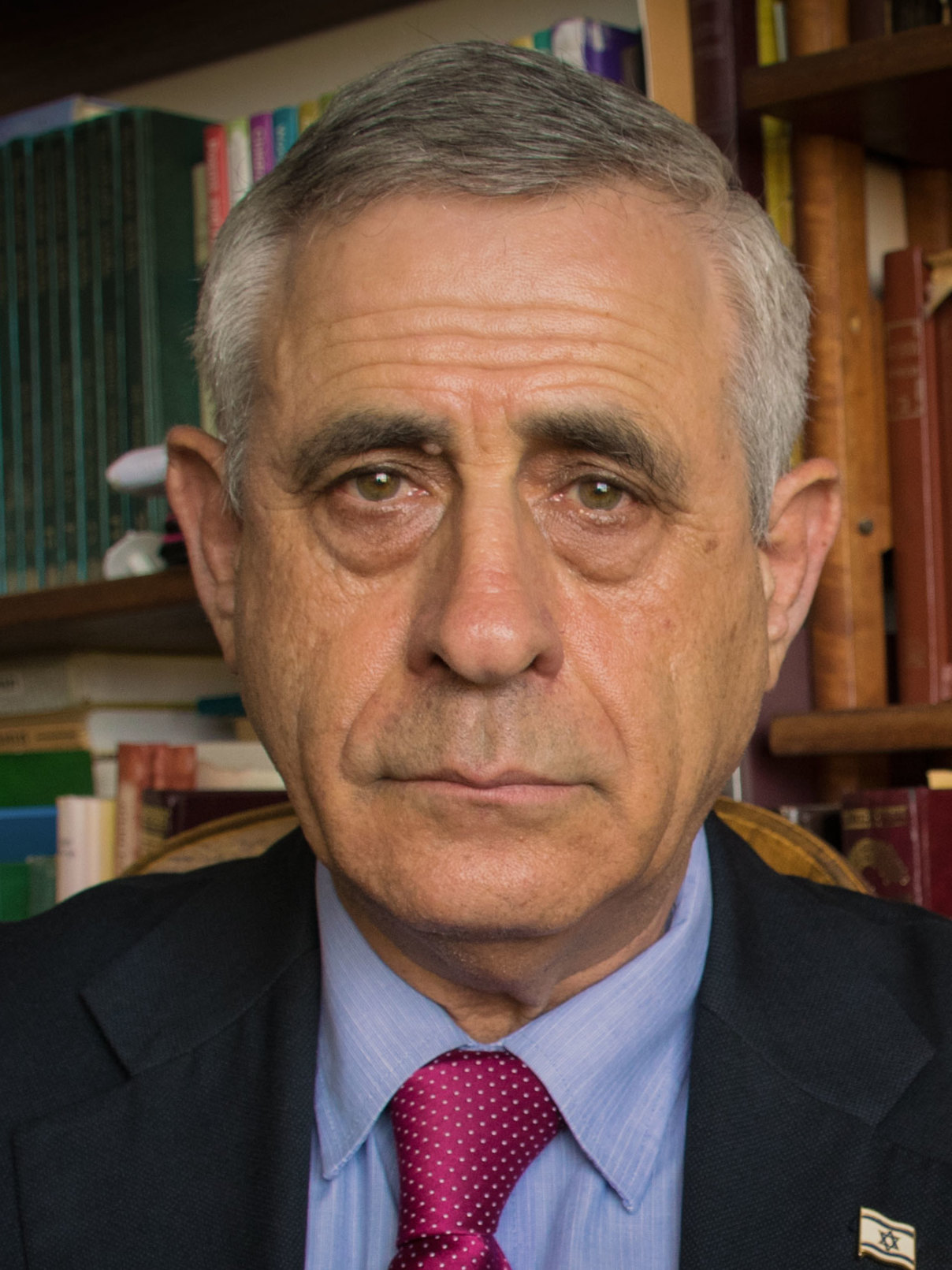
- Kedar in 2015
- Born: 25 November 1952 (age 73); Tel Aviv, Israel

Academic background
- Education: Bar-Ilan University (BA, PhD)
- Thesis: The Public Political Language of the Assad Regime in Syria: Messages and Ways of Expressing Them (1987)

Academic work
- Discipline: Arabist
- Institutions: Bar-Ilan University
- Military career
- Service: Military Intelligence Directorate
- Service years: 1970–1995
- Rank: Lieutenant colonel

Mordechai Kedar (Hebrew: מרדכי קידר, pronounced [moʁdeˈχaj keˈdaʁ]; born 25 November 1952) is an Israeli scholar of Arab culture and a lecturer at Bar-Ilan University.

== Biography ==
Mordechai Kedar was born in Tel Aviv. His Polish-Jewish parents moved to Mandatory Palestine in the 1930s. Kedar's first language was Yiddish.

Kedar is an expert in Israeli Arab culture. He served for 25 years (1970–1995) in IDF Military Intelligence, reaching the rank of lieutenant colonel. He specialized in Islamic groups, the political discourse of Arab countries, the Arabic press and mass media, and the Syrian domestic arena.

He received his PhD from Bar-Ilan University in 1987, with a thesis entitled The Public Political Language of the Assad Regime in Syria: Messages and Ways of Expressing Them. He is fluent in Hebrew, Arabic, and English. He is described as "one of the few Arabic-speaking Israeli pundits seen on Arabic satellite channels defending Israel".

== Peace proposal ==
Kedar has promoted a Palestinian-Israeli peace plan referred to as the "Palestinian Emirates" or "Eight-State Solution" since 2012.

According to him, "The eight-state solution is based on the sociology of the Middle East, which has the tribe as the major cornerstone of society. We should follow this characteristic of Middle Eastern culture as the basis for the Israeli-Palestinian solution." He says that the Western-style nation-state structures imposed on regions inhabited by multiple tribes such as Iraq, Syria, Yemen, and Libya are failed or failing, whereas states based on homogenous tribes such as the United Arab Emirates can succeed.

The eight Palestinian city-states would be the Gaza Strip, Jenin, Nablus, Ramallah, Jericho, Tulkarm, Qalqilya, and the Arab part of Hebron, all of which he says possess traditional tribal leadership structures capable of transitioning to a self-governing emirate. Geographically, each emirate would govern its city and surrounding land. Each state could independently decide its own form of government, make its own laws, educate its own people, and print its own currency if it wishes, as well as have its own media, develop its own industry and commerce, or have its people find employment within Israel. This structure gives control and responsibility to local residents to decide their own future.

The Wall Street Journal reported in July 2025 that a group of sheikhs of the Jaabari clan in Hebron, led by Wadee’ al-Jaabari, had penned a joint letter to Israeli economy minister Nir Barkat proposing to leave the Palestinian Authority to join the Abraham Accords and set up an "Emirate of Hebron". This plan had previously been proposed by Israeli scholar Mordechai Kedar, which would have Palestinian clans rule their local territories, rather than the PA or Hamas, modeled after the UAE and Qatar. Jaabari met with a WSJ writer and later a Jerusalem Post writer, and said the sheikhs reject the Oslo Accords, do not trust the Palestinian Authority, and want a new solution. The plan will create a special economic zone and allow thousands of Hebron residents to work in Israel, which stopped after the October 7 attacks.

== Views and controversies ==
=== Status of Jerusalem ===
Kedar said in June 2008, on Al Jazeera, that, "Jerusalem belongs to the Jews, period".

=== Rape only deterrent against suicide bombers ===
In July 2014, he said that threats to kill or imprison terrorists are an ineffective deterrent stating: "the only thing that deters them is if they know that their sister or their mother will be raped in the event that they are caught." A further joint statement by Kedar and Bar-Ilan University further clarified his point, stating "he did not call and is not calling to fight terror except by legal and moral means", and that:

"[Kedar] wanted to illustrate that there is no means of deterring suicide bombers, and using hyperbole, he gave the rape of women as an example. In order to remove all doubt: Dr. Kedar's words do not, God forbid, contain a recommendation to commit such despicable acts. The intention was to describe the culture of death of the terror organizations. Dr. Kedar was describing the bitter reality of the Middle East and the inability of a modern and liberal law-abiding country to fight against the terror of suicide bombers."

=== Cancelled speeches ===
In December 2014, the Finchley United Synagogue in London cancelled a speech by Kedar that had been organized through the local chapter of the Zionist Federation. On the same week, scheduled appearances at three Jewish schools were cancelled after protests regarding his association with Pamela Geller, an anti-Islam organizer from the U.S., who was banned from the U.K. the previous year. The cancellation was met with mixed reactions; the federation chair defended Kedar, and said that he had been the victim of a smear campaign, while political scientist Michael Pinto-Duschinsky said that Kedar was "toxic for interfaith relations" in the U.K. Kedar has been on the board of advisors of Geller's organization Stop Islamization of Nations (SION).

=== Conspiracy theory on Rabin murder ===
In a rally to support Israeli Prime Minister Netanyahu on the 30 October 2019, Kedar raised a conspiracy theory and suggested Yigal Amir is not the assassin of Prime Minister Yitzhak Rabin. That idea was rejected publicly by Prime Minister Netanyahu on the following day.

== Published works ==
- Kedar, Mordechai (2005). Asad in Search of Legitimacy: Message and Rhetoric in the Syrian Press under Hafiz and Bashar. Brighton: Sussex Academic Press. ISBN 1-902210-74-3.
