= International Civil Liberties Alliance =

International counter-jihad organization

The International Civil Liberties Alliance (ICLA) is an international counter-jihad organization that was originally founded as the 910 Group in 2006, and which has spanned over twenty countries. Central to the organization has been Edward S. May of the Gates of Vienna blog, Alain Wagner and Christine Brim.

The ICLA has been described as a "well-funded US group" that was based in Fairfax, Virginia, and which operated the Counter-Jihad Europa website which "acts as a clearing house for national initiatives to oppose the Islamisation of Europe". It notably organized the official international counter-jihad conferences held annually from 2007 to 2013. The organization was re-launched in 2012 as a Swiss NGO based in Basel, but has become increasingly inactive since 2014.

== History and activities ==
The ICLA began in 2006 as the 910 Group (named for the day before the September 11 attacks), originating from the Gates of Vienna comments section, which was one of the first organizations of the international counter-jihad blogosphere movement. The group aimed to protect "liberties, human rights, and religious and political freedoms [that] are under assault from extremist groups who believe in Islamist supremacy", and to be a "facilitator of worldwide communication". After absorbing other smaller groups such as British activists from the Talk Veritas and Infidel Bloggers Alliance, the organization was renamed to the Center for Vigilant Freedom (CVF) in 2007, then in 2009 to the ICLA.

The first official "counter-jihad" conference was held in Copenhagen, Denmark in April 2007, organized by the CVF, Anders Gravers Pedersen and the Stop Islamisation of Denmark (SIAD) group, coming off the Jyllands-Posten Muhammad cartoon crisis, and was attended by Fjordman and other bloggers and activists. Stop Islamisation of Europe (SIOE) was formed as a result of contacts at the conference between Pedersen and British activist Stephen Gash. In October 2007 a second conference was held in the European and Flemish Parliaments in Brussels, Belgium, organized with the help of Paul Beliën of The Brussels Journal and the Vlaams Belang party. The conference was attended by notable authors and activists such as Bat Ye'or, David Littman, Andrew G. Bostom, Robert Spencer, Pamela Geller, Lars Hedegaard, Aryeh Eldad, Patrick Sookhdeo, Paul Weston and Elisabeth Sabaditsch-Wolff.

The ICLA began attending conferences of the Organization for Security and Cooperation in Europe (OSCE) in 2009, where it has argued "for the banning of the term ‘Islamophobia’; to claim that Islam promotes violence against women; that Islam is not a religion but a political ideology; that criminalising ‘hate speech’ limits truth; and for cartoons depicting Prophet Muhammad to be publicly displayed". The organization also states that free speech is under threat from Islam. In 2012 the organization was present and protested the taking of the oath of a city councillor of the Islam List party in Anderlecht, Belgium, stating that it is "illegal and anti-democratic to tolerate an elected official who wants to turn Belgium into an Islamic state".

Activists attending OSCE conferences have included Alain Wagner, Chris Knowles, Elisabeth Sabaditsch-Wolff, Liz Schmidt, Felix Strüning, Henrik Ræder Clausen, Valerie Price, Ann Marchini, Edward S. May, and Stephen Coughlin, from affiliated groups such as ACT for America, Center for Security Policy and Citizens' Movement Pax Europa. Activist Rabia Kazan has also worked for the organisation. By 2015 the ICLA however fell out with OSCE, due to OSCE in its view "enforcing the Organisation of Islamic Cooperation’s narrative", although it has attended some later conferences. The website of the organization has been inactive since 2016.
