= CVF =

CVF may refer to:

- Climate Vulnerable Forum
- Carrier Vessel Future, the project name for the Queen Elizabeth-class aircraft carrier
- Courchevel Airport's IATA code, France
- Cyprus Volleyball Federation
- Competing values framework
- Computer Vision Foundation
- Compressed Volume File, container file for compressed FAT volumes by Microsoft DoubleSpace/DriveSpace
- Complex-valued function, function of a complex variable
- Center for Vigilant Freedom, predecessor to the International Civil Liberties Alliance
