= Udo Ulfkotte =

German journalist (1960–2017)

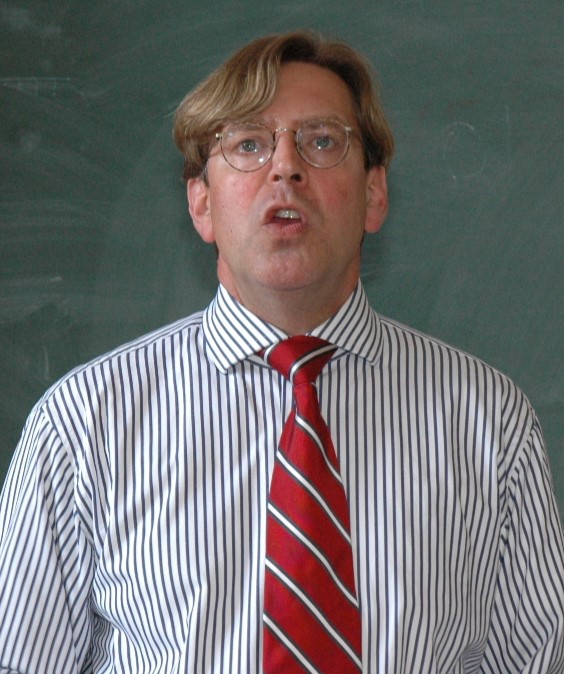
- Ulfkotte in 2007
- Born: Udo Konstantin Ulfkotte; 20 January 1960; Lippstadt, West Germany
- Died: 13 January 2017 (aged 56)
- Education: University of Freiburg (PhD)
- Occupations: Author; journalist; conspiracy theorist
- Website: ulfkotte.de

Udo Konstantin Ulfkotte (20 January 1960 – 13 January 2017) was a German journalist and author who worked for the German main daily newspaper Frankfurter Allgemeine Zeitung (FAZ) from 1986 until 2003. From the end of the 1990s, he wrote several bestsellers and increasingly advocated right-wing populist, Islamophobic, and conspiracy-theory positions. He said that journalists, including himself, and leading newspapers published material that had been fed to them, or bought, by the CIA and other Western intelligence and propaganda agencies.

== Early life and education ==
Ulfkotte was born in Lippstadt in Westphalia and grew up in Dorsten and Warburg. After graduating from high school in 1978 at the Marianum Gymnasium in Warburg, he studied law and political science at the Albert Ludwig University of Freiburg. In February 1987, he received his doctorate under Dieter Oberndörfer at the University of Freiburg with a dissertation on continuity and change of American and Soviet politics in Near and Middle East 1967 to 1980.

== Career ==
In October 1986, Ulfkotte became a member of the political editorial board of FAZ, where he belonged to the foreign policy department until 2003 and dealt with Africa, the Arab states and the United Nations. He said that he lived mainly in Islamic countries between 1986 and 1998 (including Iraq, Iran, Afghanistan, Saudi Arabia, Oman, United Arab Emirates, Egypt and Jordan) and travelled to over sixty states. These stays would have helped shape his image of Islam. According to Michael Schmidt-Salomon, he was a "born-again Christian".

During his studies, he was an employee of the CDU-oriented Konrad Adenauer Foundation and from 1999 to 2003 belonged to the planning staff of the foundation. He was regarded as a specialist in security management and business espionage. Ulfkotte was a lecturer in security management in the field of business administration at Leuphana University of Lüneburg from 1999 to 2007 and taught competition observation in the United States. From June 2005 to June 2006 he was chief correspondent for the personality magazine Park Avenue of the Hamburg publishing house Gruner + Jahr. His articles appeared among others in the magazines, Capital, Cicero, Junge Freiheit and the news agency German Telegraphic Service. Ulfkotte was a guest on several talk shows and a press club.

In 2004, the Frankfurt am Main public prosecutor's office searched Ulfkotte's private and office space because of the "suspicion of incitement to the betrayal of their secrets" of the Criminal Code. Ulfkotte is said to have known about state protection proceedings before they became publicly known. He denied bribes and said the action was politically motivated. The German Journalists' Association (DJV) said: "If it was a question of silencing a journalist in times of widespread fear of terror, it would have to be massively protested against it". The procedure was closed in 2005.

Ulfkotte wrote books on intelligence and Islamism. From 2008, his books have been published by Kopp Verlag, which is known for its conspiracy theory and right-wing populist publications. He was also a regular author of the internet portal Kopp-Online and editor-in-chief of the weekly magazine Kopp-Exklusiv. Because of his provocative right-wing views, he was considered one of the key figures between the Neue Rechte and Kopp.

== Political activities ==
Ulfkotte was a co-founder of the anti-Islamic association Pax Europa in 2006, which joined Stop Islamisation of Europe (SIOE), as part of the counter-jihad movement. In 2007, he formed the European Friends of Democracy and Values. In the 2007 Bremen parliament election, he supported the right-wing populist voters' association Citizens in Rage (BIW), which he joined in June 2007.

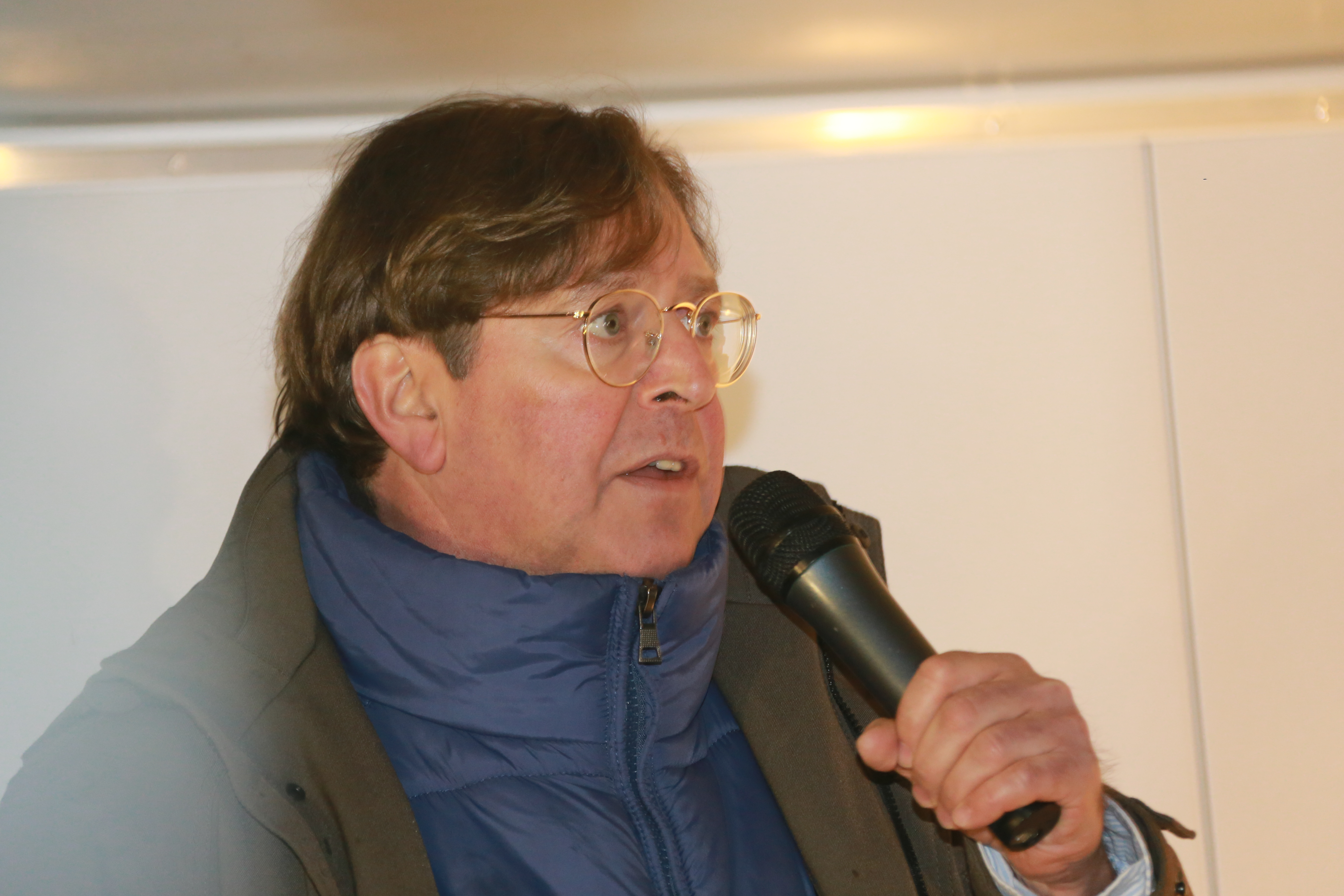
Ulfkotte at a Pegida rally in 2015

Also in June 2007, Ulfkotte signed the anti-Islam organisation Federal Association of Citizens' Movements (BDB)'s "Wertheimer Appell" against their supposed "creeping Islamisation" of Germany. On 11 September 2007, Pax Europa together with Stop Islamisation of Denmark (SIAD) and the British No Sharia Here, planned a Europe-wide demonstration against the "Islamisation of Europe" in Brussels. On 9 August 2007, this was banned by the Mayor of Brussels Freddy Thielemans. Pax Europa and SIOE approached the far-right Belgian party Vlaams Belang for their assistance. The associations complained against the ban and were represented by the Belgian lawyer Hugo Coveliers, whom Filip Dewinter of Vlaams Belang, had given them. The lawsuit filed on 30 August 2007 was dismissed. After initial cooperation, Ulfkotte and Pax Europa distanced themselves from Vlaams Belang and the Cologne branch of the German League for People and Homeland (DLVH), the Citizens' Movement Pro Cologne, which had called for participation in the demonstrations. In 2008, Pax Europa merged with the BDB to form the Citizens' Movement Pax Europa (BPE).

The German Centre Party announced before the Hamburg parliament election in 2008 that Ulfkotte was a non-party candidate on list space 2 behind the party chairman Dirk Nockemann, but he did not stand for election. In July 2008, Die Welt reported on death threats on the internet against Ulfkotte and his wife in connection with an anti-Islamic video posted on YouTube, which was not from the Ulfkottes, but was falsely attributed to them. At the beginning of December 2008, Ulfkotte left the association Citizens' Movement Pax Europa (BPE), which he founded, because of its "increasingly extremist courses".

On 22 December 2014, Ulfkotte appeared as an "official" speaker at the Bogida demonstration controlled by Pro NRW, where he made "16 arguments" in support of Pegida. He took part in a Pegida event in Dresden as a speaker on 5 January 2015.

== Bought Journalists ==
In 2014, Ulfkotte's book Gekaufte Journalisten (English: Bought Journalists: How Politicians, Intelligence Agencies and High Finance Control Germany’s Mass Media) was published. In this work, he stated that the CIA and other secret services pay money to journalists to report stories in a certain light. According to Ulfkotte, the CIA and German intelligence (BND) bribe journalists in Germany to write pro-NATO propaganda articles, and it is well understood that one may lose their media job if they fail to comply with this agenda, part of a larger pattern of media corruption he describes in the book. An English translation was released under the title Presstitutes. Several media outlets rejected Ulfkotte's claims as frivolous.

Der Spiegel wrote that "Ulfkotte's book was published by Kopp, a melting pot for conspiracy theorists. Kopp publishes works by ufologists, and by authors who claim the Americans destroyed the Twin Towers of the World Trade Center themselves in 2001. Ulfkotte's book was on the bestseller lists for months. According to the magazine, "Bought Journalists is the bible of all those who have renounced their faith in the German media. Ulfkotte's critics see the book as a vendetta against the Frankfurter Allgemeine Zeitung, which he left on bad terms."

== Death ==
Ulfkotte died from a heart attack on 13 January 2017 at the age of 56.

== Works ==
=== English-language books ===
- Presstitutes Embedded in the Pay of the CIA: A Confession from the Profession. Progressive Press. 2019. ISBN 978-1-61577-017-5.
- Journalists for Hire: How the CIA Buys the News. Next Revelation. 2017. ISBN 978-1-944505-45-5.

=== German-language books ===
- Volkspädagogen: Wie uns die Massenmedien politisch korrekt erziehen wollen [People's Educators: How the Mass Media Seek to Bring Us up Politically Correct]. Kopp. 2019. ISBN 978-3-86445-694-7.
- Mekka Deutschland: Die stille Islamisierung [Mecca Germany: The Silent Islamization]. Kopp. 2019. ISBN 978-3-86445-666-4.
- Gekaufte Journalisten: Wie Politiker, Geheimdienste und Hochfinanz Deutschlands Massenmedien lenken [Bought Journalists: How Politicians, Intelligence Agencies, and High Finance Control Germany's Mass Media]. Kopp. 2014. ISBN 978-3-86445-143-0.
- Vorsicht Bürgerkrieg!: Was lange gärt, wird endlich Wut [Look out for Civil War!: What Long Festers Finally Becomes Anger]. Kopp. 2009. ISBN 978-3-938516-94-2.
- Heiliger Krieg in Europa: wie die radikale Muslimbruderschaft unsere Gesellschaft bedroht [Holy War in Europe: How the Radical Muslim Brotherhood Threatens Our Society]. Eichborn. 2007. ISBN 978-3-8218-5577-6.
- Der Krieg im Dunkeln: die wahre Macht der Geheimdienste [War in the Dark. The True Power of the Intelligence Agencies]. Eichborn. 2006. ISBN 978-3-8218-5578-3.
- Grenzenlos kriminell: die Risiken der EU-Osterweiterung: was Politiker verschweigen [Limitless Criminality: The Risks of the Eastward Expansion of the EU: What the Politicians Keep Quiet]. Bertelsmann. 2004. ISBN 978-3-570-00200-1.
- Der Krieg in unseren Städten: wie radikale Islamisten Deutschland unterwandern [The War in Our Cities: How Radical Islamists Are Infiltrating Germany]. Eichborn. 2003. ISBN 978-3-596-16340-3.
- Wirtschaftsspionage: wie deutsche Unternehmen von ausländischen Geheimdiensten ausgeplündert und ruiniert werden [Industrial Espionage: How German Companies Are Looted and Ruined by Foreign Intelligence Agencies]. Goldmann. 2001. ISBN 978-3-442-15125-7.
- Propheten des Terrors: das geheime Netzwerk der Islamisten [Prophets of Terror. The Secret Network of the Islamists]. Goldmann. 2001. ISBN 978-3-442-15196-7.
- So lügen Journalisten: der Kampf um Quoten und Auflagen [How Journalists Lie: The Fight for Ratings and Circulation]. Bertelsmann. 2001. ISBN 978-3-570-00199-8.
- Gencode J: Roman [Gene Code J: A Novel]. Eichborn. 2001. ISBN 978-3-8218-0860-4.
- Marktplatz der Diebe: wie die Wirtschaftsspionage deutsche Unternehmen ausplündert und ruiniert [The Thieves' Market: How Industrial Espionage Looted and Ruined German Companies]. Bertelsmann. 1999. ISBN 978-3-570-00198-1.
- Verschlusssache BND [German Secret Service Top Secret]. Koehler und Amelang. 1997. ISBN 978-3-7338-0214-1.
