= E.S. v. Austria (2018) =

European Court of Human Rights case

- Full case name: E.S. AS v. Austria
- Chamber: Chamber

Keywords
- Freedom of expression

E.S. v. Austria was a case held before the European Court of Human Rights (ECHR) case where the court upheld the criminal conviction of an Austrian woman for the crime of Herabwürdigung religiöser Lehren (in English: "disparaging religious doctrines" or "mocking religious teachings") because she had called Muhammad a pedophile.. This was due to "the right of others to have their religious feelings protected".

The applicant, E.S. (Elisabeth Sabaditsch-Wolff), is an Austrian national who was born in 1971 and lives in Vienna.

In October and November 2009, Mrs S. held two seminars entitled "Basic Information on Islam", in which she discussed the marriage between the Islamic prophet Muhammad and a six-year old girl, Aisha, which was consummated when she was nine. Inter alia, the applicant stated that Muhammad "liked to do it with children" and "... A 56-year-old and a six-year-old? ... What do we call it, if it is not paedophilia?".

On 15 February 2011, the Vienna Regional Criminal Court found that these statements implied that Muhammad had had paedophilic tendencies, and convicted Mrs S. for disparaging religious doctrines. She was ordered to pay a fine of 480 euros and the costs of the proceedings. Mrs S. appealed but the Vienna Court of Appeal upheld the decision in December 2011, confirming in essence the lower court's findings.

== Original statement ==
The statement that the Austrian woman originally said was:

One of the biggest problems we are facing today is that Muhammad is seen as the ideal man, the perfect human, the perfect Muslim. That means that the highest commandment for a male Muslim is to imitate Muhammad, to live his life. This does not happen according to our social standards and laws. Because he was a warlord, he had many women, to put it like this, and liked to do it with children. And according to our standards, he was not a perfect human. We have huge problems with that today, that Muslims get into conflict with democracy and our value system ...

The most important of all Hadith collections recognised by all legal schools: The most important is the Sahih Al-Bukhari. If a Hadith was quoted after Bukhari, one can be sure that all Muslims will recognise it. And, unfortunately, in Al-Bukhari the thing with Aisha and child sex is written...

I remember my sister, I have said this several times already, when [S.W.] made her famous statement in Graz, my sister called me and asked: 'For God's sake. Did you tell [S.W.] that?' To which I answered: 'No, it wasn't me, but you can look it up, it's not really a secret.' And her: 'You can't say it like that!' And me: 'A 56-year-old and a six-year-old? What do you call that? Give me an example? What do we call it, if it is not paedophilia?' Her: 'Well, one has to paraphrase it, say it in a more diplomatic way.' My sister is symptomatic [sic]. We have heard that so many times. 'Those were different times' – it wasn't okay back then, and it's not okay today. Full stop. And it is still happening today. One can never approve something like that. They all create their own reality because the truth is so cruel ...

== Court's decision ==
Only where expressions under Article 10 went beyond the limits of a critical denial, and certainly where they were likely to incite religious intolerance, might a state legitimately consider them to be incompatible with respect for the freedom of thought, conscience and religion and take proportionate restrictive measures.

The court noted that the domestic courts comprehensively explained why they considered that the applicant's statements had been capable of arousing justified indignation; specifically, they had not been made in an objective manner contributing to a debate of public interest (e.g. on child marriage), but could only be understood as having been aimed at demonstrating that Muhammad was not worthy of worship. (Note: "Worship" is the word used in the English version of the ruling, even though worshipping Muhammad (considering him divine) is shirk, a sin in Islam. Muslims venerate Muhammad but do not worship him.)

Furthermore, the Court held that her statements were partly based on untrue facts and apt to arouse indignation in others. The national courts found that Mrs S. had subjectively labelled Muhammad with paedophilia as his general sexual preference, and that she failed to neutrally inform her audience of the historical background, which consequently did not allow for a serious debate on that issue. Hence, the court saw no reason to depart from the domestic courts' qualification of the impugned statements as value judgments which they had based on a detailed analysis of the statements made.

The court held further that even in a lively discussion it was not compatible with Article 10 of the Convention to pack incriminating statements into the wrapping of an otherwise acceptable expression of opinion and claim that this rendered passable those statements exceeding the permissible limits of freedom of expression.

The court's decision was unanimous without concurring opinion. In March 2019, the Grand Chamber panel of five judges rejected the request for referral to the Grand Chamber. The decision became final.

== International reactions ==
The case was subject to criticism in public reporting, including the accusation that the judgment "imposed" a blasphemy law in Europe. Nevertheless, it was a source of concern for human rights commentators. The International Humanist and Ethical Union, an INGO concerned with humanist advocacy and repeal of blasphemy laws, was "frustrated" that the court did not uphold the complainant's Article 10 rights, criticising the court's "timidity".

The British charity Humanists UK, which campaigns on similar issues internationally, criticised the ruling as "fundamentally at odds with the spirit and tradition of free expression in Europe" expressed hope the case would be appealed and overturned in the Grand Chamber. It criticised the court's rationale in balancing the Article 10 right it is sworn to protect against "a previously nonexistent right to protection of one's 'religious feelings'". In a later speech on blasphemy laws before the UN Human Rights Council, Humanists UK cited the Austria judgment as running "counter to the principles held by the Universal Declaration of Human Rights, and to the spirit and purpose of human rights as an international enterprise."

Writing in The Atlantic, Simon Cottee expressed serious concerns about the judgment, saying "it has given legitimacy to what is in all but name an Austrian blasphemy law, and by invoking the slippery notion of "religious peace," it has effectively given a veto to those who would deploy violence in defense of their religious beliefs."

Reactions from academics were varied. Some authors outlined that with this judgment the European Court of Human Right applied different standards to very similar situation ruled in the past. Moreover, no concrete offence to any individual was demonstrated, but only to the quite fuzzy and undefined "religious peace" of Austria, and even that only potentially. For that reason it has been claimed that this judgment de facto endorsed the use of anti-blasphemy laws.

== Later related rulings ==
In September 2022, in the subsequent ECtHR case Rabczewska v. Poland the Court ruled differently than in E.S. v Austria, and ruled that Polish courts in a similar case concerning Catholicism "failed to identify and carefully weigh the competing interests at stake" and overturned a 2012 conviction for blasphemy. The court declared, among other things:

The time has come to reassess this case-law. Which new direction should be taken? One new approach could be to examine all blasphemy-related restrictions on freedom of expression under Article 10 exclusively in terms of the legitimate aim of protecting public order (religious peace). We consider that the following paragraph (no. 15) of PACE Recommendation 1805 (2007) is potentially very important for any such new direction: "national law should only penalise expressions concerning religious matters which intentionally and severely disturb public order and call for public violence" (see paragraph 29 of the judgment).
