= Storvorde =

- Coordinates: 57°0′N 10°5′E
- Country: Denmark
- Region: North Denmark (Nordjylland)
- Municipality: Aalborg

Area
  - Urban: 2 km^{2} (0.77 sq mi)

Population (2026)
  - Urban: 3,491
  - Urban density: 1,700/km^{2} (4,500/sq mi)

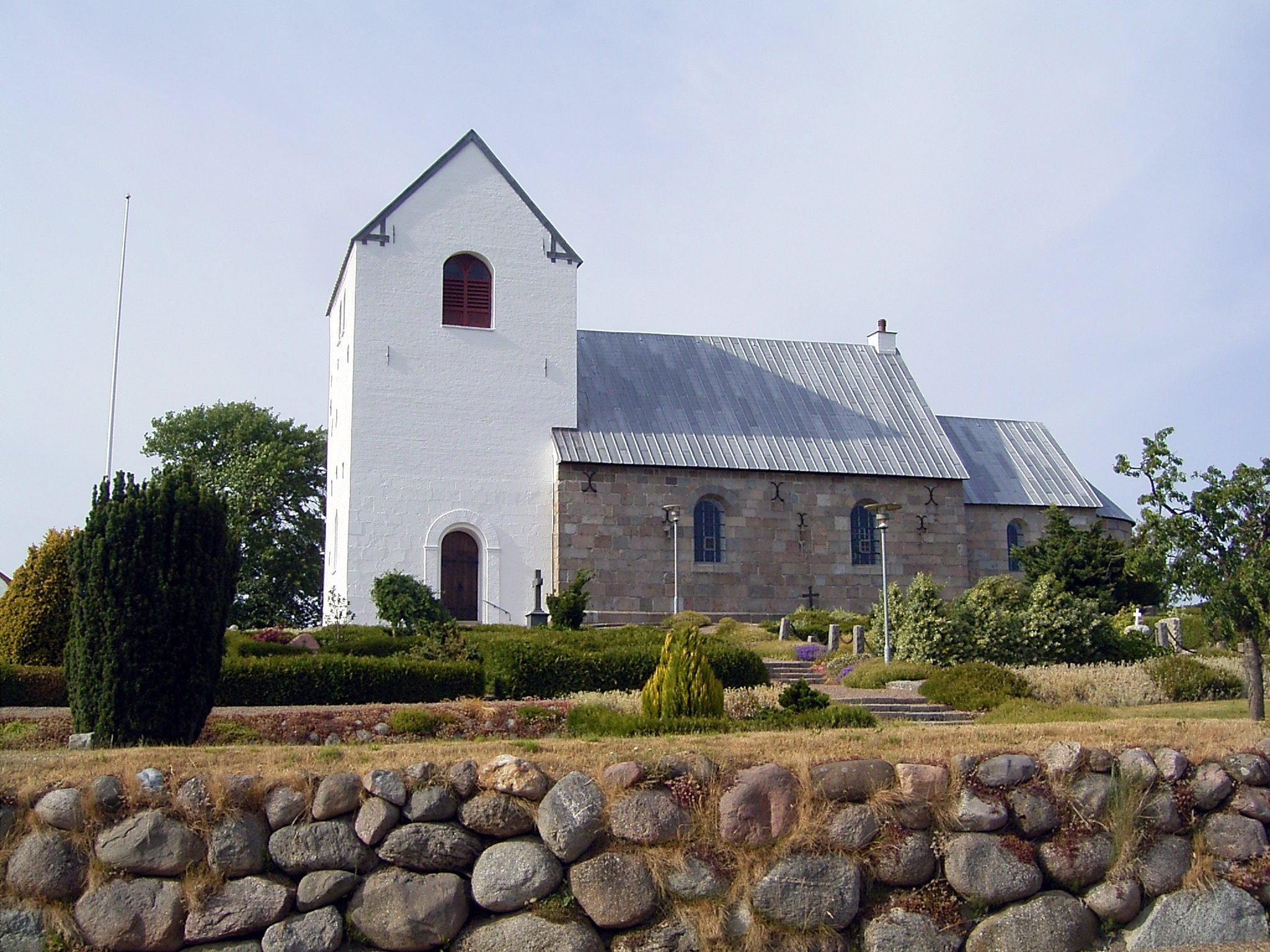
Gudum Kirke (church) Storvorde, Aalborg Kommune, Denmark.

Storvorde is a small town to the east of Aalborg in Denmark with a population of 3,491 (1 January 2026).

== Notable people ==
- Anders Gravers Pedersen (born 13 May 1960) is a Danish anti-Islam activist, lives in Storvorde.
