= Anders Gravers Pedersen =

Danish anti-Islam activist

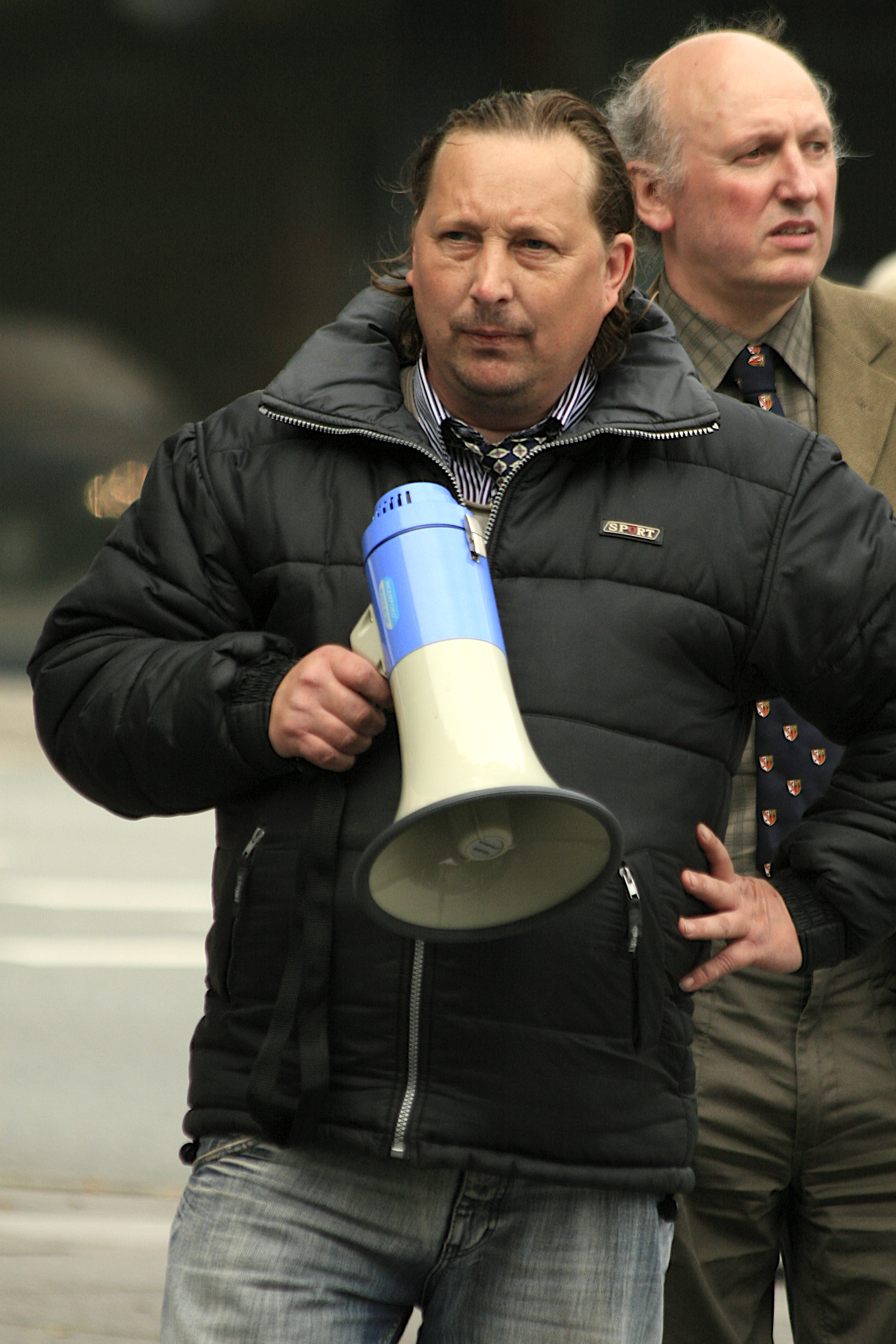
Gravers Pedersen (front) in 2008

Anders Gravers Pedersen (born 13 May 1960) is a Danish anti-Islam activist. He is the chairman and founder of Stop Islamisation of Denmark (SIAD), and leader of Stop Islamisation of Europe (SIOE). He also established transatlantic connections with Stop Islamization of America (SIOA) and Stop Islamization of Nations (SION).

== Activities ==
=== Demonstrations ===
Gravers Pedersen has been instrumental in forming the street-based activist parts of the counter-jihad movement since he founded Stop Islamisation of Denmark (SIAD) in 2005. He founded the organisation in response to seeing television images of Muslims burning the Danish flag as part of to the Jyllands-Posten Muhammad cartoons controversy. He was formerly a member of the anti-immigration policy-focused Danish Association, but founded SIAD as he wanted more action. With SIAD, he helped organise the first international counter-jihad conference in Copenhagen in 2007 along with the Center for Vigilant Freedom (CVF).

Gravers Pedersen founded Stop Islamisation of Europe (SIOE) following the 2007 conference together with English activist Stephen Gash. In the capacity of leading SIOE, SIAD and Gravers Pedersen were each sentenced to pay fines of 10,000 kr in 2008 for violating a court order against using Kurt Westergaard's Muhammad cartoon at a rally.

In 2010, he helped form Stop Islamization of America (SIOA) with the bloggers Pamela Geller and Robert Spencer. The same year, Gravers Pedersen was assaulted at a rally in Aalborg. He participated in staging a rally and arranging a counter-jihad demonstration along with the English Defence League (EDL), including Tommy Robinson, and numerous other international activists in Aarhus in March 2012. In August 2012, he participated in an international counter-jihad rally in Stockholm along with Robinson, the EDL, Geller, Spencer, and the newly founded Stop Islamization of Nations (SION) among others.

Gravers Pedersen said in 2013, that due to his criticism of Islam, he has to live on a secret address, and that he has to have bodyguards when appearing in public.

=== Contesting elections ===
Gravers Pedersen contested the municipal election in Aalborg in 2005, in which SIAD received a total of 1,172 votes. In the 2007 Danish general election Pedersen stood in Jutland and gained 73 votes. He attempted to run for a seat in the Danish parliament in 2009 and in 2012.
