= Henrik Ræder Clausen =

Danish politician (born 1963)

- Born: 21 September 1963 (age 62)
- Occupations: Politician, blogger
- Political party: Danish People's Party; New Right (formerly)

Henrik Ræder Clausen (born 21 September 1963) is a Danish politician. Clausen has been noted as a critic of Islam, and formerly published the news blog EuropeNews.

== Political activities ==
Clausen was a member of the Danish People's Party from 2004 to 2011, when he left the party due to restrictions on what he could say and write publicly. He was a candidate for the party for the 2009 European Parliament elections. He later joined the New Right party, and was a candidate for the party in the 2021 municipal elections and the 2022 general elections. By 2024 he had returned to the Danish People's Party, and became a member of its board in Aarhus.

Clausen became a publisher of the news blog EuropeNews.dk in 2007, which has been described as being affiliated with the counter-jihad movement, and published both an English-language and German-language edition. The blog is now defunct.

From 2009 to 2019, he spoke at several conferences at the Organization for Security and Co-operation in Europe (OSCE) for the International Civil Liberties Alliance. He participated in several of the international counter-jihad conferences since 2008, and in an ACT for America conference in 2014. He has also been an organiser of the annual national conservative event Mosbjerg Folkefest.

Clausen's writings has been published on the blogs Jihad Watch, The Brussels Journal and Gates of Vienna. In 2009, he wrote on Jihad Watch that Islam had worse ethics than Satanism. He has also written in Jyllands-Posten in support of the Hungarian anti-LGBT law.

== Personal life ==
Clausen grew up in Brabrand in Aarhus Municipality, but moved to Copenhagen for several years where he wrote about computer technology for the magazine Komputer for Alle. He moved back to Brabrand in 2005 where he works as a web developer and programmer.

== Bibliography ==
- EU: den rigtige historie; den skjulte dagsorden [EU: the true history; the hidden agenda] (in Danish). Forskningsforlaget Rafael. 2009. ISBN 978-8791107313.
- Cypern: i halvmånens skygge [Cyprus: in the shadow of the crescent] (in Danish). Textcraft Team. 2012. ISBN 978-8799614714.
