= Matthew Bracken =

American writer

- Born: 1957 (age 68–69); Baltimore, Maryland, U.S.
- Occupations: Writer, novelist, former US Navy SEAL
- Notable work: Enemies trilogy

Matthew J. Bracken (born 1957) is an American writer and novelist, and former U.S. Navy SEAL associated with the Patriot movement. He is known for a series of novels, beginning with the Enemies trilogy, that depict a United States torn apart by violent conflict. He is a frequent guest on podcasts such as Mario Nawfal and DialogWorks, and occasional guest host on Alex Jones' InfoWars show.

== SEAL service and background ==
Bracken was born in Baltimore, and earned a degree in Russian studies from the University of Virginia in 1979. He was commissioned to the US Navy in the Naval Reserve Officers Training Corps (NROTC) program, and graduated from Basic Underwater Demolition/SEAL (BUD/S) training class 105 in Coronado, California. He served on Underwater Demolition Team UDT/Seal teams on the east coast, and detached with the Naval Special Warfare to Beirut in 1983. Bracken left active duty after Lebanon, but remained in active reserve status through the 1980s. He served on Seal Team 2 and Seal Team 4.

In 1991, Bracken protested outside the White House for days against Operation Desert Storm. He is also a boatbuilder and sailor, who once soloed his cutter from Panama to Guam. Bracken is noted for incorporating his experience and knowledge in sailing and the military into the technical details of his books.

== Writings and views ==
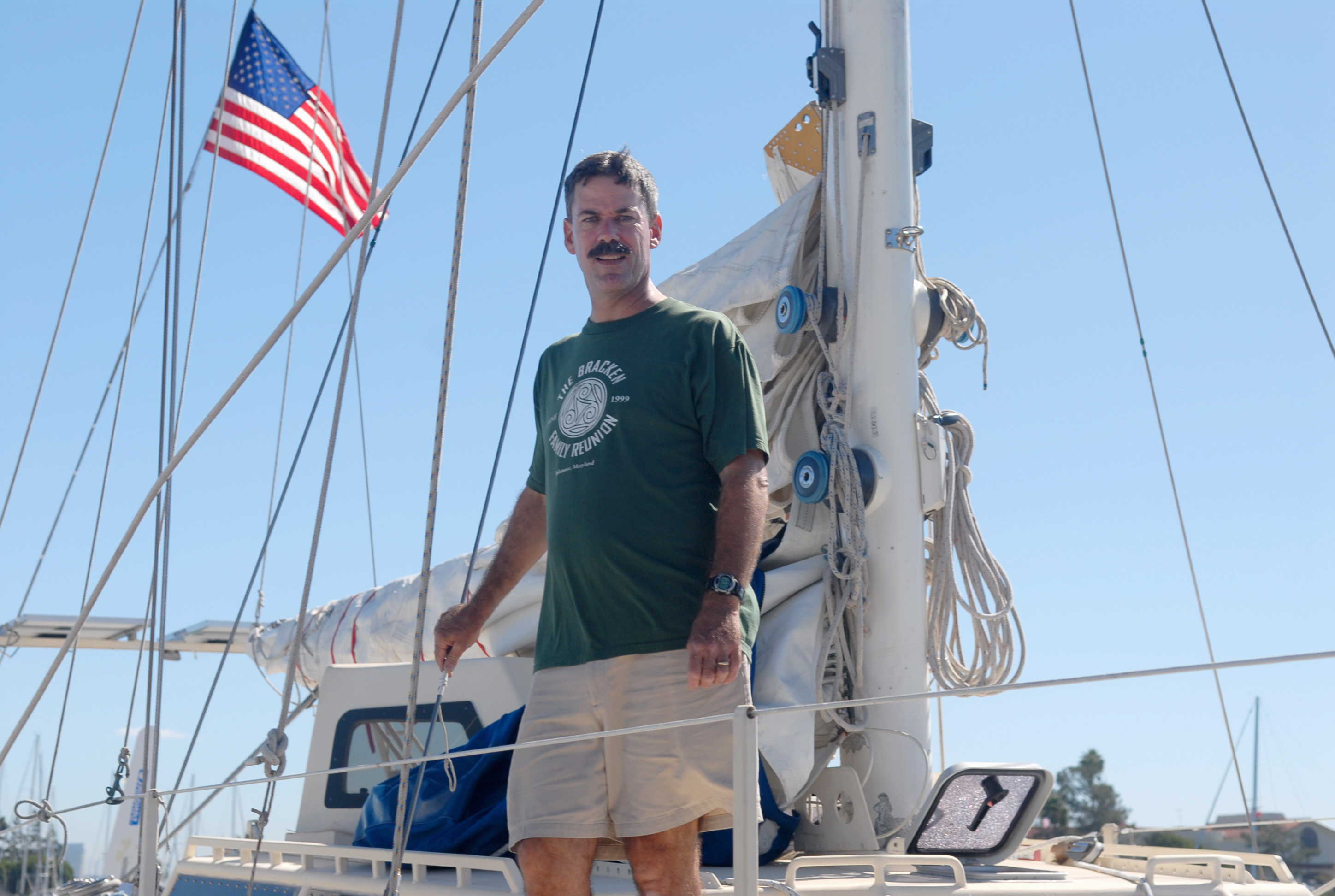
Bracken, an avid sailor, on his hand-built cutter in 2005

Bracken self-published his first novel, Enemies, Foreign and Domestic in 2003, the first in a trilogy of political thrillers. The plot revolves around a rogue ATF agent staging a terrorist attack at a football stadium and blaming it on an alleged militia, which is then used to initiate gun seizures. In 2012, Bracken released the book for free at Amazon Kindle, which after being heavily promoted on social media briefly made it the most downloaded free Kindle book on Amazon. His second novel, Domestic Enemies: The Reconquista from 2006 revolves around the Reconquista or Aztlán theory, while his third novel, Foreign Enemies And Traitors from 2009 features a corrupt president who invites foreign mercenaries to U.S. soil.

It has been said that his books can be "worked into ongoing conspiracy theories", as "fictionalized version[s] of conspiracy theories and beliefs that circulate on the far-right".

In late 2015, Bracken published the essay "Tet, Take Two: Islam's 2016 European Offensive" on the counter-jihad blog Gates of Vienna, which went viral. The essay likened the 2015 European migrant crisis to the infiltration leading up to the Vietnam War's Tet Offensive, and has been influential in parts of the American militia movement, being endorsed by Oath Keepers founder Stewart Rhodes among others. Bracken and Rhodes later appeared on Alex Jones' InfoWars show together in 2019 following the Christchurch mosque shootings, where the three according to the Southern Poverty Law Center—while condemning the violence, agreed with the terrorist's motives, while "lamenting how the massacre was going to be used to blame white men and to further a nefarious plot to confiscate firearms and ignite a civil war".

After the Quebec City mosque shooting in 2017, Bracken appeared on InfoWars and laid out a conspiracy theory that it was a false flag attack carried out by militant Islamists in order to blame Trump supporters, orchestrated by George Soros, claiming that detainee Mohamed Belkadhir had radicalized perpetrator Alexandre Bissonnette as an Islamic terrorist.

In December 2020, Bracken appeared again on InfoWars as a guest host, where he told viewers that "We're going to only be saved by millions of Americans moving to Washington, occupying the entire area, if—if necessary storming right into the Capitol". He also stated "We know the rules of engagement. If you have enough people, you can push down any kind of a fence or a wall". The comments were referenced during a subpoena of Alex Jones by the United States House Select Committee on the January 6 Attack in January 2022, after which Jones claimed he had not heard it before and was "shocked" by it. The comments were also included in the January 6th Report, and was shown as part of a video segment during the seventh hearing by the committee.

== Bibliography ==
- Enemies Foreign And Domestic. Enemies trilogy. Steelcutter. 2003. ISBN 978-0972831017.
- Domestic Enemies: The Reconquista. Enemies trilogy. Steelcutter. 2006. ISBN 978-0972831024.
- Foreign Enemies And Traitors. Enemies trilogy. Steelcutter. 2009. ISBN 978-0972831031.
- Castigo Cay. The Dan Kilmer "Rebel Yell" series. Steelcutter. 2011. ISBN 978-0972831048.
- The Red Cliffs of Zerhoun. The Dan Kilmer "Rebel Yell" series. Steelcutter. 2017. ISBN 978-0972831055.
- The Bracken Collection: Essays and Short Fiction 2010 to 2019. Steelcutter. 2019. ISBN 978-0972831079.
- Doomsday Reef. The Dan Kilmer "Rebel Yell" series. Steelcutter. 2024. ISBN 978-0972831086.
