= Stop Islamisation of Europe =

British anti-Islamic organisation

- Abbreviation: SIOE
- Formation: 2007
- Headquarters: United Kingdom
- Website: Stop Islamisation of Europe

Stop Islamisation of Europe (SIOE) is a pan-European counter-jihad organisation with the stated goal of "preventing Islam from becoming a dominant political force in Europe". It is a political interest group which has been active in Denmark and has conducted anti-Islamic protests in the United Kingdom. The group originated out of the joining of the Danish group Stop Islamisation of Denmark with English anti-Islam activists.

The group says that its aim is to oppose Islamic extremism; they have the motto "Racism is the lowest form of human stupidity, but Islamophobia is the height of common sense".

== Ideology ==
The group describes itself as an alliance "with the single aim of preventing Islam becoming a dominant political force in Europe." The organisation calls for the total boycott of Muslim countries. The group advises boycotts of companies including Fisher-Price, Asda, Kentucky Fried Chicken and The Radisson Hotel chain because of their marketing of products to Muslims.

== History ==
Stop the Islamisation of Europe was inspired by a Danish group of the same name who have held protests outside Danish mosques since the Jyllands-Posten Muhammad cartoons controversy. The group has 6,600 supporters on its Facebook page. Social networking sites have been used to plan protests.

Affiliate organisations have been created in eleven European countries including Denmark, Russia, Finland, France, Germany, Norway, Poland, Romania, and Sweden, as well as the United States of America.

== Leaders ==
=== Stephen Gash ===
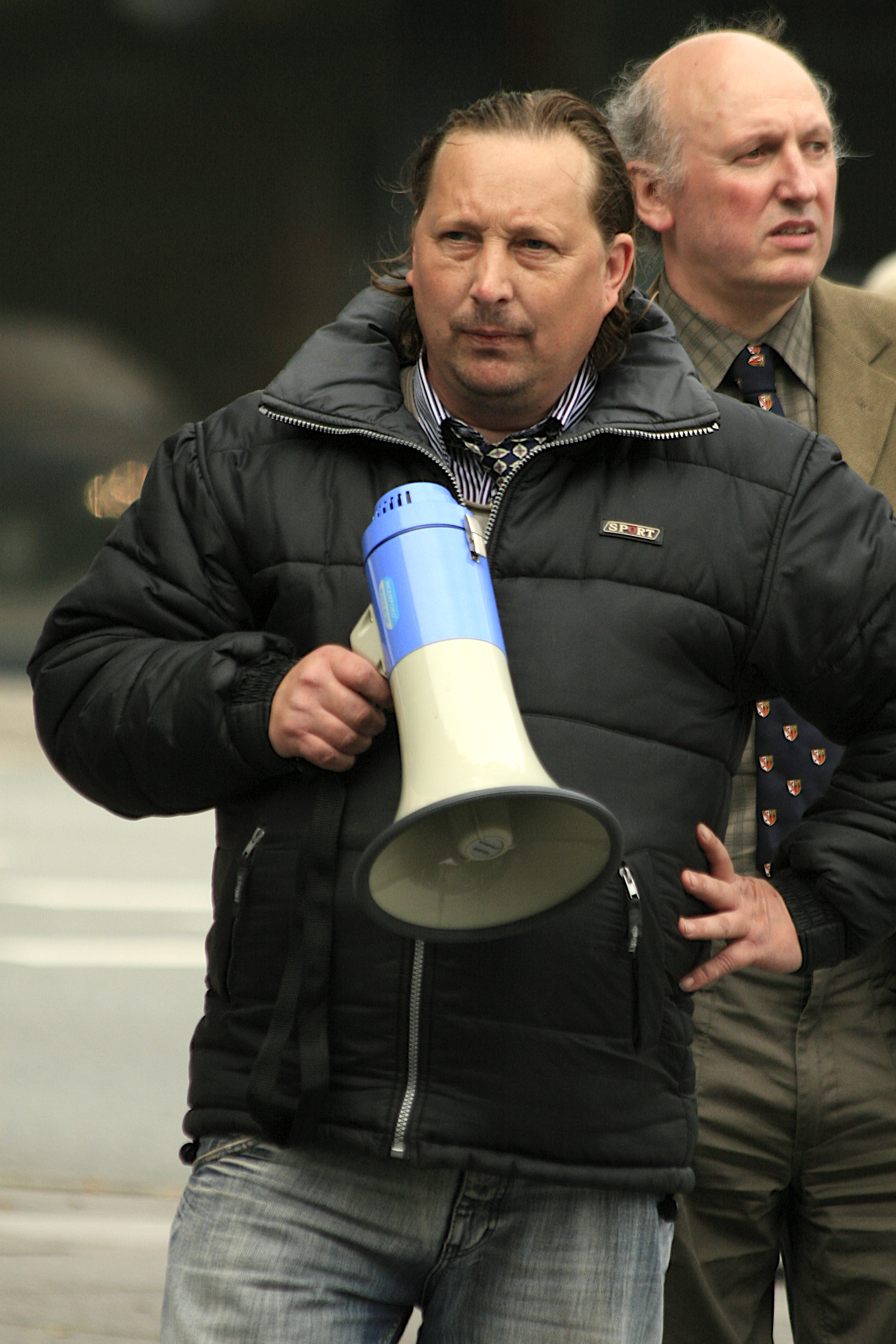
Chairman of Stop Islamisation of Denmark Anders Gravers Pedersen (left) and spokesman of SIOE in the UK Stephen Gash (right)

Stephen Gash (born 1953) is the spokesman of SIOE in the UK, and stood in the 2007 Sedgefield by-election (triggered by the resignation of Prime Minister Tony Blair) for the English Democrats Party. Gash gained 177 votes (this represented 0.6% of the votes cast at the election) . According to his election literature the main themes of his campaign were support for an English Parliament, resolving the West Lothian question and immigration control. Gash has also contested local elections for Carlisle City Council.

=== Anders Gravers Pedersen ===
Anders Gravers Pedersen was born in Denmark and lives in the small town of Storvorde. He contested municipal elections in Aalborg in 2005 and gained 383 votes and the group Stop the Islamisation of Denmark received a total of 1,172 votes. This represented less than 1% of the votes cast in the election. At the 2007 Danish parliamentary election, Pedersen stood in Jutland and won 73 votes.

== England ==
=== Central London ===
In October 2007, the group staged a demonstration in central London.

=== Harrow Central Mosque protest ===
On 11 September 2009, SIOE co-sponsored a demonstration with the English Defence League (EDL) in Harrow which generated national and international media attention. The purpose of the demonstration was to campaign against the building of a five-storey mosque, Harrow Central Mosque, which was under construction. The group had pledged to hold a peaceful protest after the EDL cancelled a planned protest on 29 August 2009.

In response to the protest, several Jewish community leaders condemned the group, after SIOE openly appealed to the Jewish community in an effort to encourage 1,000 Jews to carry the Israeli flag and support the protest. Rabbis Kathleen Middleton, Frank Smith, Aaron Goldstein, Hillel Robles and Mike Hilton sent a letter supporting the Harrow Mosque, saying SIOE use "outrageous lies" to try to divide Harrow's community, adding "As leaders of the Jewish community in Harrow, we are writing to express our support for our Muslim friends and neighbours, especially those at Harrow Central Mosque, who are under attack from those whose only purpose is to spread hatred and fear." The protests were also condemned by Councillor Susan Hall and Tory councillors Anjana Patel and Jeremy Zeid (who are Hindu and Jewish respectively), by The Jewish Chronicle newspaper, and the Community Security Trust (CST), which monitors discrimination on behalf of the Jewish community in the UK. The CST asserted that SIOE "...provides the fuel for terrorism. British Jews should have no part of it." Unite Against Fascism was present to oppose the demo, as well as Muslims there to defend the mosque. In all, over 1,000 people gathered outside the mosque. Counterdemonstrators clashed with the police, throwing bricks, bottles and firecrackers. Ten arrests were made during the protests, including the organiser of the protest Stephen Gash.

== Denmark ==
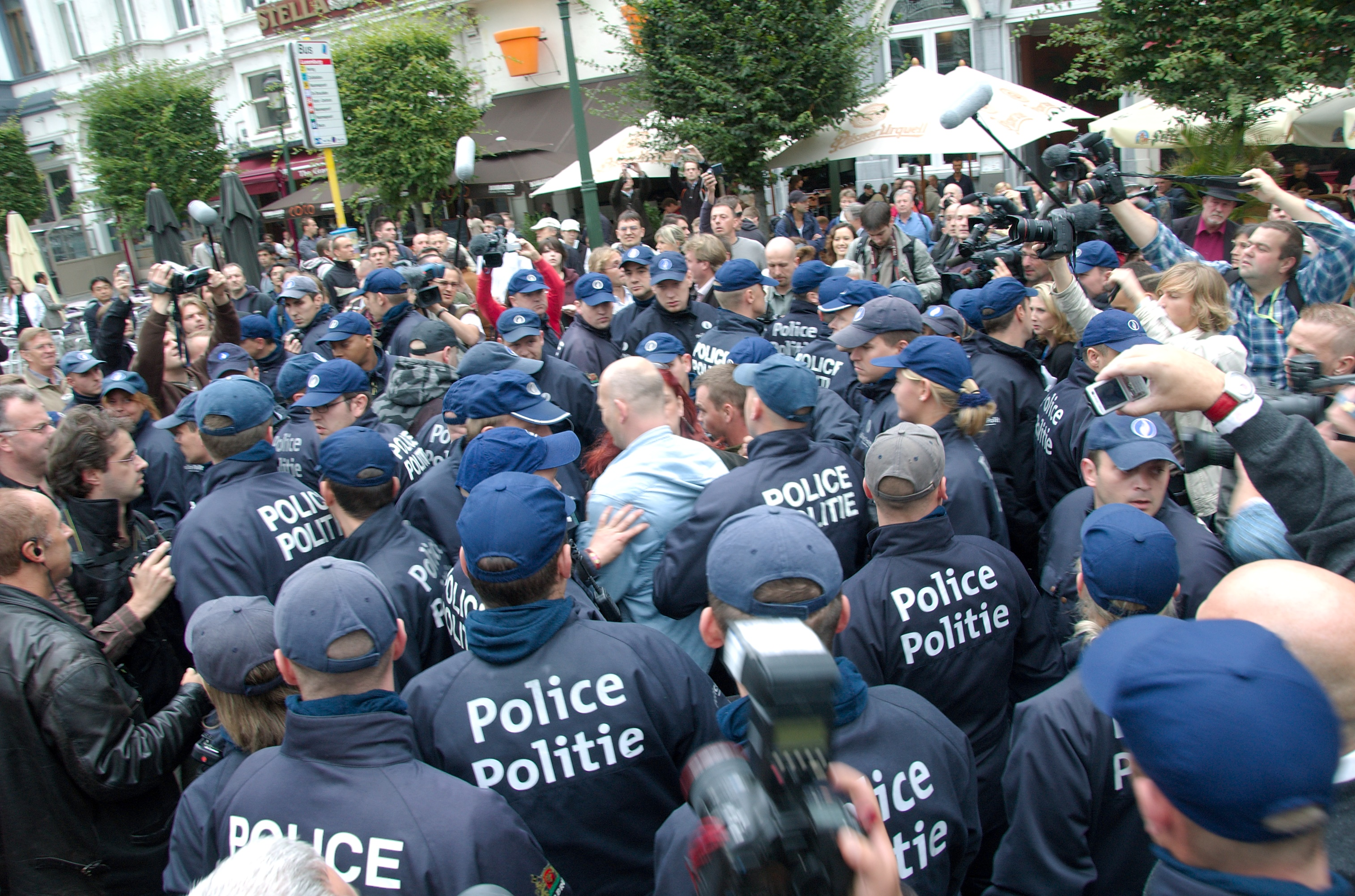
A demonstration staged by Stop Islamification of Europe being policed in Brussels, Belgium

SIOE was originally a Danish anti-Islamist group which originated out of the Jyllands-Posten Muhammad cartoons controversy. The group was founded in 2007 by Anders Gravers Pedersen, the leader of a small Danish party called the Stop the Islamisation of Denmark (Danish: Stop Islamiseringen af Danmark). On 11 September 2007, the group staged a demonstration in Brussels, Belgium.

== Norway ==
SIOE established a branch in Norway in 2008, from a group that had originally been formed in 2000. The Norwegian branch, SIAN, however broke its ties to SIOE in 2012.

== Germany ==
There has been a branch of SIOE in Germany that has been led by Michael Stürzenberger. Udo Ulfkotte's former Pax Europa organisation was part of SIOE in the mid-late 2000s.

== Poland ==
A branch SIOE was established in 2007 in Poland.

== Bulgaria ==
There was a branch of SIOE in Bulgaria that was formerly led by Pavel Chernev.

== Criticism ==
In September 2009, John Denham, Labour's Communities Secretary, criticised the group and stated that it was "trying to provoke violence on Britain's streets" and called it "right-wing". Unite Against Fascism have opposed the group. The British National Party has consistently denied any links with SIOE.

== See also ==
- Stop Islamization of America
- Stop Islamization of Nations
- English Defence League
- Pegida
