= Gates of Vienna =

Far-right blog (e. 2004)

- Website type: Political blog
- Available in: English
- Owner: Edward S. May
- Website: gatesofvienna.net
- Launched: October 2004

Gates of Vienna is a far-right blog established in 2004 by Edward S. May and his wife. The website has featured the writings of international hardline anti-Muslim writers such as Fjordman and Paul Weston, and "is a central player in the counter-jihad movement within the United States and across Europe".

== History and activities ==
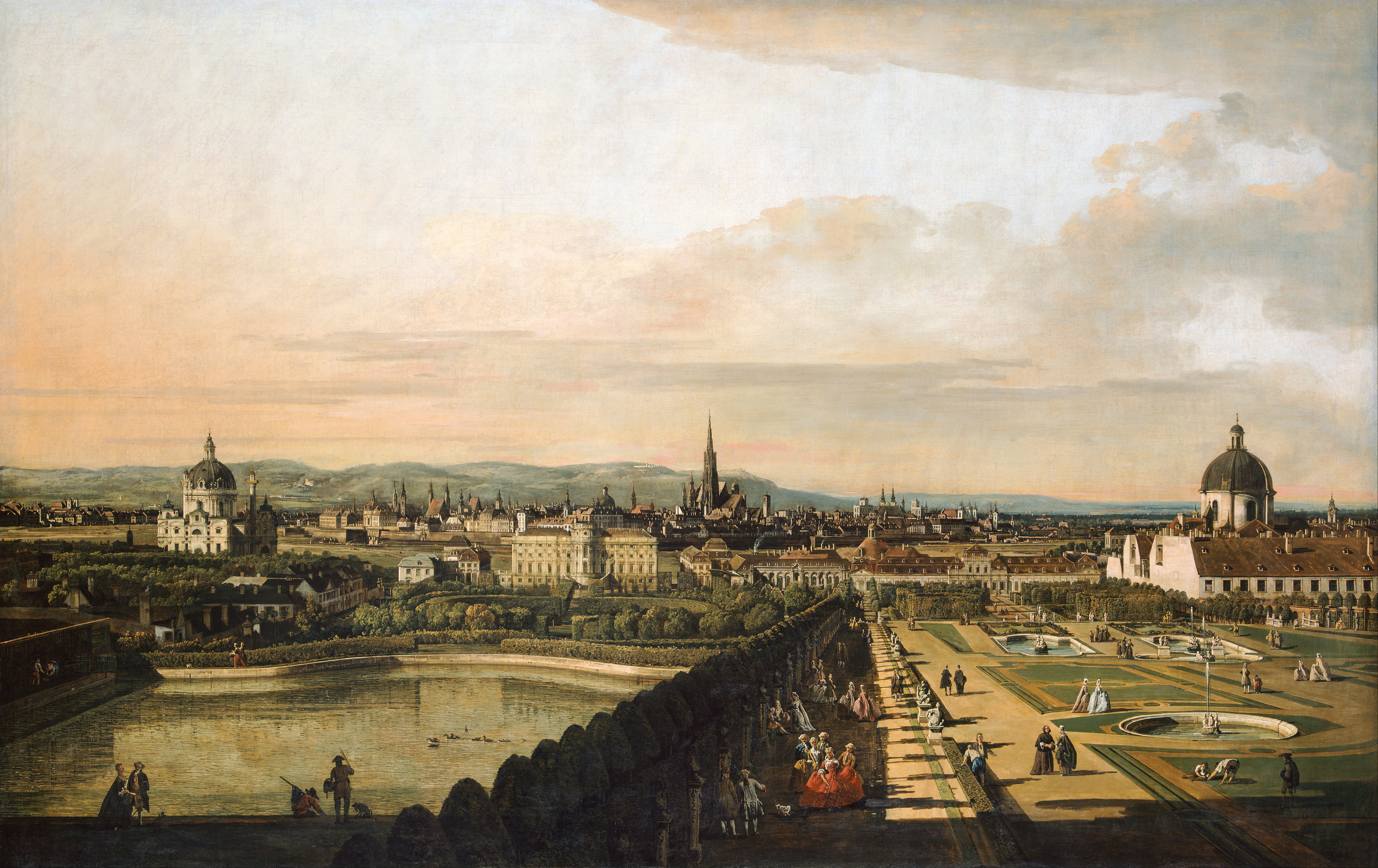
Vienna Viewed from the Belvedere Palace, 1761. Painting by Bernardo Bellotto that is adopted by the site

The first blog entry was published on Blogspot in January 2003 by Baron Bodissey, a pseudonym used by May, along with his wife who wrote as Dymphna, and was run from Virginia, United States. The name of the blog comes from the 1683 battle of Vienna, in which the alliance of Polish and Austrian armies defeated the invading Turkish Ottomans, framed by the blog as part of a centuries-long war between Christianity and Islam. The blog considers this the beginning of the end of the "second wave" of the "Great Islamic Jihad", while considering the September 11 attacks in 2001 a significant part of the beginning of the "third wave". The website itself was founded in October 2004.

May also writes as Ned May, and describes himself as a "computer programmer with some outlandish right-wing political ideas". May has later participated in several "counter-jihad" conferences, has been on the board of directors of the International Free Press Society, and was the director of the International Civil Liberties Alliance (formerly the 910 Group and the Center for Vigilant Freedom). He wrote articles for Breitbart News around 2011, and was "the principal organizer of the international counter-jihad movement from 2006-2011" according to Hope not Hate. The blog was investigated by the FBI after the 2011 Norway attacks as it was revealed that it was one of the most cited websites in the manifesto of Anders Behring Breivik, a neo-Nazi who exploited counter-jihad writings. May has later said that the attack, which he condemned, has been used to try to "shut down" criticism of Islam and Sharia.

One of the most prominent writers on the site is Fjordman, who presents Muslims as being in an ongoing warfare with Western society, which he claims is being precluded from being recognized by mainstream society by political correctness and Cultural Marxism, and presents multiculturalism as a form of totalitarianism. Another writer is El Inglés, who in contrast to most other writers "more or less directly advocate violence" in extended hypotheticals about future violent confrontations between Muslims and European citizens. Paul Weston has written about an impending civil war with Muslims, while Seneca III is said to promote ideas drawn from within elements of the Nouvelle Droite. The essay "Tet, Take Two: Islam's 2016 European Offensive", written by Matthew Bracken, which likened the 2015 European migrant crisis to the infiltration leading up to the Vietnam War's Tet Offensive, has been noted to have been influential in parts of the American militia movement. Danish psychologist Nicolai Sennels has also written for the site.

In 2015, a group of British Labour Party MPs called for an investigation into the site following what was described as a "training manual for anti-Muslim paramilitaries", amid fears that an upcoming exhibition of cartoons of Muhammad in London was designed to incite Islamist violence.

The website features a banner that promotes the books and activities of counter-jihad figures such as Geert Wilders, Elisabeth Sabaditsch-Wolff and Tommy Robinson. The site has also supported far-right activist groups such as the English Defence League and Pegida. In addition, it hosts a news feed with around one hundred weekly news stories of various topics helped by "tipsters".
