= Stop Islamisation of Denmark =

Anti-Islam organization in Denmark

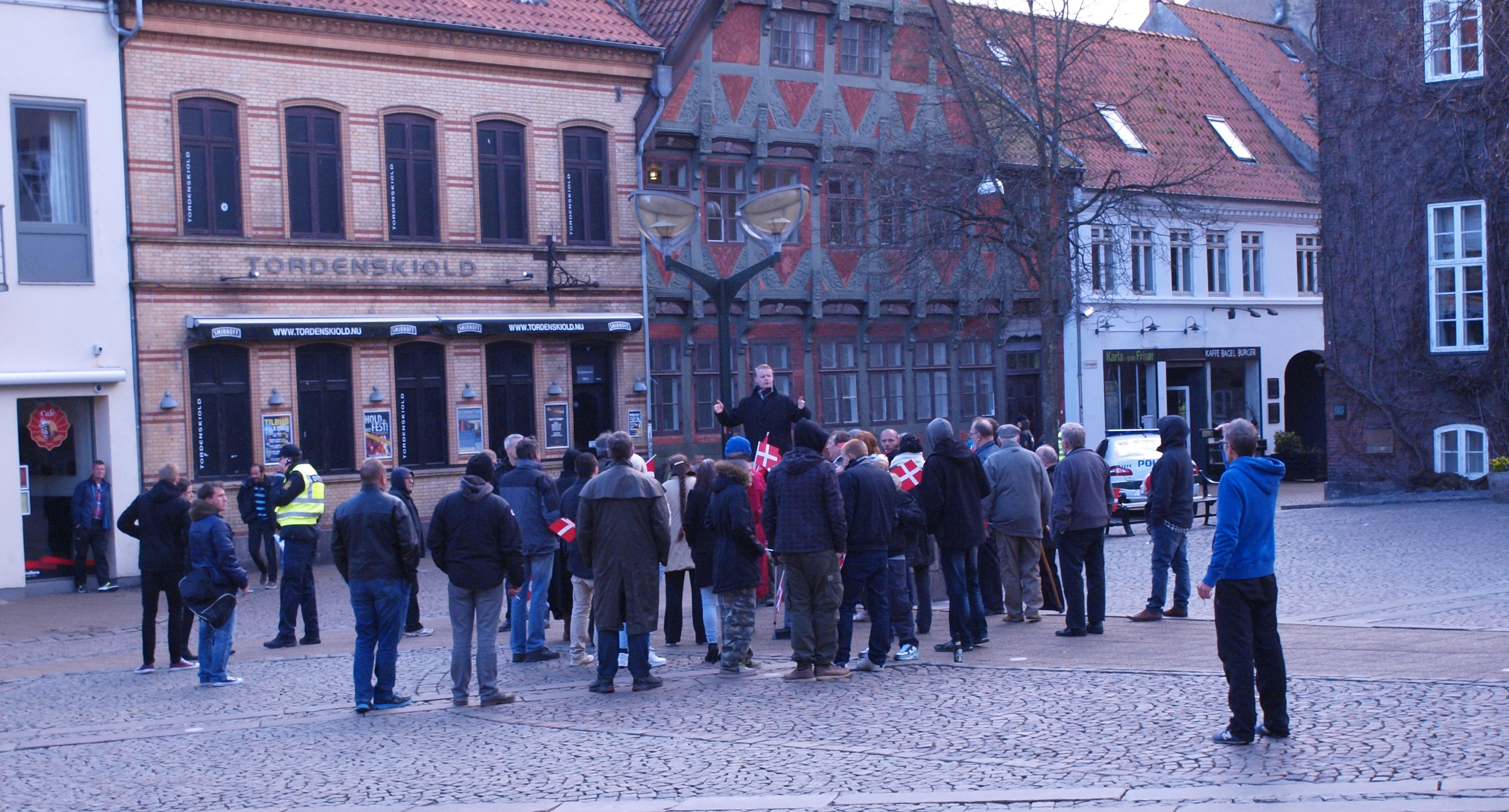
- SIAD demonstration in 2015
- Formation: 2005
- Type: Anti-Islam
- Location: Denmark
- Leader: Anders Gravers Pedersen
- Affiliations: Stop Islamisation of Europe

Stop Islamisation of Denmark (Danish: Stop Islamiseringen af Danmark, SIAD) is a Danish anti-Islam organisation founded in 2005. The group was founded by Anders Gravers Pedersen who began the development of the activist part of the counter-jihad movement.

The organisation considers its work to be comparable to the resistance movement during the Second World War, and a report by the Danish Center for Social Science Research on extremist movements in 2014 designated the group as "radical right".

== History and activities ==
The group has been active in campaigning against the building of mosques in Denmark and has staged free speech demonstrations in relation to the Jyllands-Posten Muhammad cartoons controversy. In 2007 the group protested outside of the European Union headquarters in Brussels, and launched the Europe-wide Stop Islamisation of Europe (SIOE) following the international counter-jihad conference in Copenhagen.

In 2013 a few dozen SIAD-demonstrators protested against discrimination against Jews. Counter-demonstrators fired off maroons and roman candles, and 32 counter-demonstrators were arrested.

The group announced several demonstrations in a "Denmark tour" in 2015, at the same time that a new anti-Islam group, Pegida Denmark also began its demonstrations.

== See also ==
- Islam in Denmark
- Stop Islamisation of Norway
- Stop Islamization of America
