= Pamela Geller =

American political commentator and conspiracy theorist (born 1958)

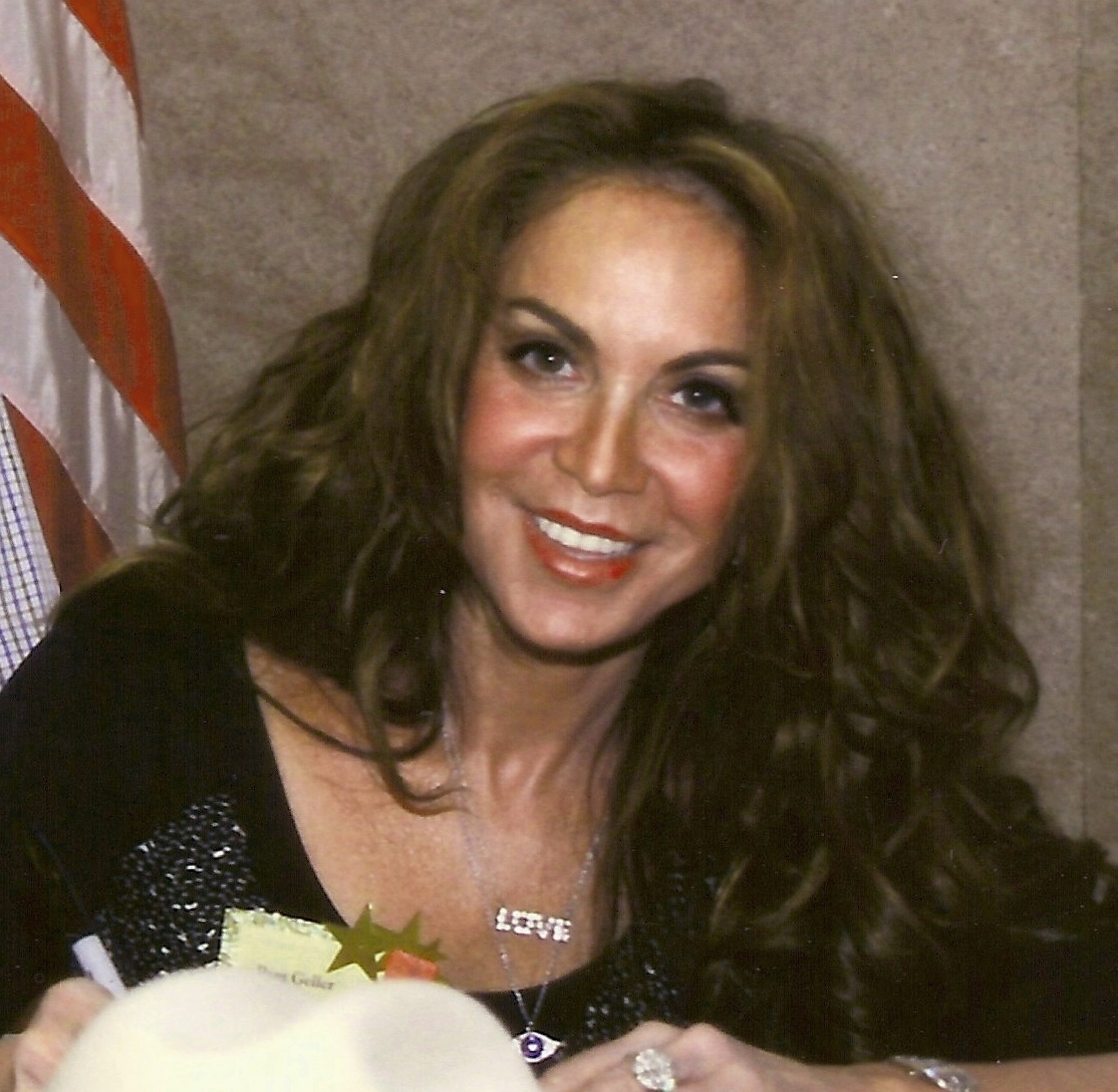
- Geller in 2011
- Born: 1958 (age 67–68)
- Education: Hofstra University; left before completing degree
- Occupations: Political activist, commentator, former newspaper editor
- Known for: Opposition to Park51 community center and mosque
- Spouse: Michael Oshry (1990–2007; divorced)
- Children: 4
- Website: gellerreport.com

Pamela Geller (born 1958) is an American anti-Muslim, far-right political activist, blogger and commentator. Geller promoted birther conspiracy theories about Barack Obama, saying that he was born in Kenya and that he is a Muslim.

In 2006, Geller reproduced the controversial Danish cartoons of Muhammad published by the Jyllands-Posten newspaper on her blog. She came to further notice in 2010 for leading the campaign against the proposed Park51 Islamic community center in New York City, which Geller called the "Ground Zero Mega Mosque." She is the president of Stop Islamization of America (also known as the American Freedom Defense Initiative), an anti-Muslim group which she co-founded with Robert B. Spencer. Since 2013, she has bought anti-Muslim ads on public transit networks in various cities. She has also denied genocides where Muslims were victims, including the Bosnian genocide and the Rohingya genocide. The British government barred Geller's entry into the UK in 2013, citing her anti-Muslim activism, and saying her presence would “not be conducive to the public good.” She has been targeted by Islamic fundamentalists in a number of assassination attempts.

Geller launched her first blog, Atlas Shrugs, in 2004. It was succeeded by the Geller Report. Both websites have been known for promoting falsehoods and conspiracy theories.

== Early life ==
Geller is the third of four sisters born to a Jewish family; her father, Reuben Geller, is a textile manufacturer, and her mother is Lillian Geller. She grew up in Hewlett Harbor, on New York's Long Island. She helped out in her father's business, where she learned to speak fluent Spanish. Two of her sisters became doctors, and the third became a teacher. Geller attended Lynbrook High School and Hofstra University, leaving before she completed her degree.

== Career ==
=== Media ===
During most of the 1980s, Geller worked at the New York Daily News—first as a financial analyst, and then in advertising and marketing. Subsequently, she was associate publisher of The New York Observer from 1989 through 1994. In a Village Voice interview, Geller indicated that she had only become political since the 9/11 attacks, after which she began reading authors on Islam such as Bat Ye'or and Ibn Warraq, saying she "spent years studying the matter before I started blogging."

=== Political activism ===
Geller created a blog called Atlas Shrugs (a reference to Atlas Shrugged, the novel by Ayn Rand) in 2004. Geller was a frequent and prolific commenter on the blog Little Green Footballs when, encouraged by a fellow commenter, she started her own blog in late 2004. She has referred to her blog as “my living room and kitchen—a place where she can kick back and yell, like some people shout at their TV,” in contrast to her books and published articles, which are “more studied and more measured.” The blog gained attention in 2006, when Geller reprinted the controversial cartoons of Muhammad that were originally published in the Danish Jyllands-Posten newspaper. In 2007, her campaign against an Arabic language public school in Brooklyn was said to have played "an important role" in the resignation of its principal, Debbie Almontaser. The blog has been criticized by progressive Media Matters for America. Conversely, it has been praised by Caroline Glick, managing editor of The Jerusalem Post, who hailed the blog's coverage of Muslim "honor killings" and called her "an intrepid blogger," specifically for Geller's coverage of treatment of women under Sharia law and in Islamic countries.

In 2010, Geller co-founded the American Freedom Defense Initiative organization (AFDI), also known as Stop Islamization of America, with Robert Spencer, an anti-Muslim activist. Geller is a co-founder of Stop Islamization of Nations, an umbrella organization that includes Stop Islamization of America and Stop Islamisation of Europe. Both SIOA and AFDI are described as exhibiting anti-Muslim bigotry by the Anti-Defamation League. The Southern Poverty Law Center classifies them as hate groups.

At the 2010 Conservative Political Action Conference (CPAC), Geller criticized the Pentagon's report on the 2009 Fort Hood shooting for failing to talk about the religious motivations behind the attack. Geller was forbidden to appear at CPAC in 2013. Geller attributed her exclusion from the event to her having accused CPAC board members Grover Norquist and Suhail Khan of being “members of the Muslim Brotherhood and secret Islamist agents.”

The British government barred Geller's entry into the UK in 2013, citing her anti-Muslim activism, and saying her presence would “not be conducive to the public good.”

In April 2013, Rabbi Michael White and Jerome Davidson, in denouncing Geller as an anti-Muslim bigot, opposed her presentation on Sharia law at a Long Island synagogue. It was canceled due to security concerns. Israeli columnist Caroline Glick disputed the assertions by White and Davidson, and argued that Geller opposed jihadists, not all Muslims. In May 2013, the Jewish Defense League of Canada invited Geller to speak in Toronto, Canada. Initially, Geller was invited by Rabbi Mendel Kaplan to speak at Chabad@Flamingo. Because Kaplan was a chaplain with the York Regional Police, the police's Hate Crimes Unit stated that Kaplan's invitation conflicted with “our long-held position of inclusivity.” Kaplan consequently cancelled Geller's invitation, and she spoke at the Toronto Zionist Centre.

Geller has been a contributor to The Washington Times, Newsmax, Human Events, WorldNetDaily, the American Thinker, Israel National News and Breitbart News. She has written a column titled "Defending the West" for WorldNetDaily starting in 2011.

She runs the website, The Geller Report, which is registered through her organization, the American Freedom Defense Initiative. In October 2018, the website falsely claimed that a Swedish Christmas concert had been cancelled, so as to not offend Muslims. In November 2018, the website falsely claimed that former National Security Advisor Michael Flynn had been cleared of criminal wrong-doing in the Russia probe. The website described the Russia probe as a "coup" against President Donald Trump. The website promoted falsehoods about the COVID-19 pandemic.

==== Park51 ====
In May 2010, Geller began a campaign against the proposed Park51 Islamic community center and mosque, which she called the "Ground Zero Mega Mosque." Geller claimed that Park51 is viewed by Muslims as a "triumphal" monument built on "conquered land," and asserted: “I'm not leading the charge against the Islamic center near Ground Zero. The majority of Americans—70%—find this deeply insulting, offensive. To call it anti-Muslim is a gross misrepresentation, and to say that I'm responsible for all this emotion, again a gross misrepresentation.” When asked whether she agreed “that the terrorists who attacked us on 9/11 were practicing a perverted form of Islam, and that is not what is going to be practiced at this mosque,” she responded: “I will say that the Muslim terrorists were practicing pure Islam, original Islam.” Based upon unsubstantiated evidence, Geller has claimed that Park51's project financing had potential ties to terrorists. Geller came to prominence over her opposition to the mosque's construction. According to Time magazine, Geller "played a pivotal role in making Park51 a national issue." According to Stephanie Wright in Fear of Muslims?, Geller's language in opposing the mosque was repeated by mainstream politicians, such as Sarah Palin and Newt Gingrich.

The Council on American–Islamic Relations and the progressive watchdog group Media Matters for America criticized the media for giving attention to Geller. Andrew C. McCarthy, writing in the conservative magazine National Review, criticized the CAIR spokesperson's remarks on the matter, citing his remark: “I wouldn’t want to create the impression that I wouldn’t like the government of the United States to be Islamic.” According to Cord Jefferson in the American Prospect, “the media often craves controversy over substance,” and paid "disproportionate attention" to the Park51 story, thus furnishing “a small-time political blogger with an obsession” an opportunity “to hijack the news cycle for months.”

==== Public transit ads ====
Stop Islamization of America has sponsored ads which carried instigative messages, such as "Fatwa on Your Head?" and "Leaving Islam?" in several cities, including New York City and Miami, which pointed readers to a website called RefugefromIslam.com. Geller and FDI/SIOA paid to run ads on the transit systems of New York City, Washington, D.C., and San Francisco. The ad approved to run on the New York City Subway and San Francisco buses read: “In any war between the civilized man and the savage, support the civilized man. Support Israel. Defeat Jihad.” One ad had a picture of the World Trade Center in flames, with a quote from the Quran: “Soon we shall cast terror into the hearts of the unbelievers.” Another ad showed a man in a keffiyah, with the text: “Killing Jews is Worship that draws us close to Allah. That's His Jihad. What's yours?”

New York's MTA initially refused to display the ads in the New York City Subway system, but the decision was overturned in July 2012 by the United States District Court for the Southern District of New York, which ruled that the ad was protected speech under the First Amendment, and that the MTA's actions were unconstitutional. The judge, Paul A. Engelmayer, held in a 35-page opinion that the rejected ad was “not only protected speech — it is core political speech ... [which as such] is afforded the highest level of protection under the First Amendment.”

Opponents argued that an ad with the text, “In any war between the civilized man and the savage, support the civilized man. Support Israel. Defeat Jihad” implied Muslims are savages. Columnists in the New York Post and The Algemeiner argued the opposite—that it was insulting to assume Muslims will identify with violent jihad. Some Muslims argued that Geller's use of the word jihad is identical to Islamic extremists', and too common in general American usage. There is an effort to focus on the notion of jihad as a striving, but find "rebranding" difficult in today's culture. The Jewish Council for Public Affairs called the ad "bigoted, divisive," and JCPA President Rabbi Steve Gutow said: “The fact that ads have been placed in the subway attacking Israel does not excuse the use of attack ads against Muslims.” Israel Kasnett, editor for the Jerusalem Post, argued that Geller is right in her description of violent jihad. Jewish groups, such as the Jewish Community Relations Council and the Anti-Defamation League, have “successfully persuaded the San Francisco Municipal Transportation Agency to donate proceeds from the ads to the city's Human Rights Commission.” In a column for The Wall Street Journal, conservative columnist William McGurn criticized the "media" for being “too quick to assume the ad is an attack on the religion and all Muslims.”

In 2013, Geller purchased ad space at thirty-nine New York City Subway stations for a new ad that “[linked] Islam to terrorism.” Prompted by an ad critical of Israel on the subway, Geller said she was exercising her freedom of speech by showing a picture of the burning World Trade Center juxtaposed with a quote from the Koran. The ads went up in January 2013, and ran for about a month. In the fall of 2014, Geller paid $100,000 for a series of ads to run on the MTA again. They linked Islam to the Islamic State, Hamas, Adolf Hitler, and the beheading of James Foley; a court ruling required the MTA to run the ads. The ads were also run on Philadelphia's SEPTA transit system, and Washington, D.C.'s WMATA transit system. Daniel Pipes wrote the ads backfired, and united people of all religions against what was viewed as an attack on all Muslims. The MTA, SEPTA, and Washington's Metro have decided to ban all political ads.

In 2015, Geller announced that she would run ads on public transit systems accusing donors to the New Israel Fund of being supporters of the anti-Israel BDS movement, although a spokesperson from NIF said the charge is false. Geller wrote that: “These leaders are 21st-century kapos, but worse ... They are leftists aligned with the jihad force.”

=== Curtis Culwell Center attack ===
Geller helped to organize a "Draw the Prophet" cartoon contest on May 3, 2015, at the Curtis Culwell Center in Garland, Texas, the same site where a Muslim group held a "Stand With the Prophet" event in January 2015, after the Charlie Hebdo shooting. The same day, shots were fired outside the event in Garland, resulting in the death of two suspected shooters by the police, and the injury of one security guard. The decision to hold the cartoon contest received both criticism and support from a number of journalists and other public figures.

=== June 2015 assassination plot ===
On June 2, 2015, a 26-year-old Muslim man, identified as Rahim Nicholas, was shot and killed by police officers in Boston, after he waved a military knife at them and charged at them with it. Reported to have been radicalized by the militant Islamist group ISIS, Rahim was plotting to travel out of the state to assassinate Geller. His thwarted plan was in retaliation to Geller's Muhammad art event and contest. Rahim allegedly abandoned the idea, and decided to behead police officers instead. Upon learning of the assassination plot, Geller said in an interview with CNN: “They targeted me for violating Sharia blasphemy laws.” The leader of the plot, David Wright, was sentenced to 28 years in prison in 2017 for the plot, and resentenced to 30 years in 2020.

== Views ==
=== Anti-Muslim views ===
Geller being heckled during a speech in 2017

She has been widely described as anti-Muslim. Geller is a prominent activist in what has been described as the counter-jihad movement in the United States. She has been described as part of a broader anti-Muslim network or industry. Business Insider has described Geller as a "promoter of anti-Muslim conspiracy theories." Snopes has fact-checked a number of Geller's assertions about Muslims and Islam, and found them to be false. These include: false assertions by Geller that Muslims declared 24 December as Muhammad's birthday, in order to disrupt Christmas celebrations; her promotion of a fake video as evidence of crime by Muslim immigrants in Italy; false claims that Muslim groups kept the money that they raised for the victims of the Tree of Life synagogue shooting; and baseless assertions that Muslims celebrated the Notre Dame fire of 2019. In 2017, she falsely claimed that the Las Vegas shooter was a leftist. In 2018, she falsely claimed that the Parkland shooter “was immersed in Islamic and leftwing hate.”

Geller frequently characterizes incidents involving Muslims as part of a "jihad." In 2011, she warned of “Vehicular Jihad in Arizona,” after reports of a man named Ajaz Rahaman had crashed into a supermarket; it was later shown that he had suffered a heart attack. She also claimed "vehicular jihad" when an Egyptian immigrant drove a car onto a curb, hurting pedestrians; she omitted that the police determined he had fallen asleep at the wheel. Geller has mischaracterized a variety of different events as being a part of jihad, including: an incident that involved a mentally ill, teenaged Bosnian shooter in Salt Lake City; as well as assaults of Walmart staff and customers by meth addicts. She has speculated that Virginia Tech mass shooter Seung-Hui Cho was a jihadi. In 2011, she removed posts from her website as part of the settlement of a defamation lawsuit; she had accused a Columbus, Ohio attorney of ties to Hamas. In 2017, her website published a video which falsely claimed a Muslim migrant had beat up a Dutch boy on crutches.

Geller denies she is anti-Muslim, saying: “I love Muslims. I help them.” She has said the only “moderate Muslim is a secular Muslim,” and that when Muslims pray, they are cursing Jews and Christians. She has claimed that Muslims practice bestiality. Geller has expressed that “Islam is the most anti-Semitic, genocidal ideology in the world.” She has asserted that terrorists don't spring from “perversions of Islam, but from the religion itself.”

Geller has been criticized by the Anti-Defamation League, Council on American-Islamic Relations, and Southern Poverty Law Center for espousing Islamophobia. She has dismissed the SPLC as an "uber left" organization. Political activist Charles Jacobs says that Geller takes aim at "radical Islam," comes to the defense of victims of honor killings, and deals with Islamist antisemitism—which the ADL and SPLC fail to address.

==== 2011 Norway attacks ====
She was cited, along with others, in Anders Behring Breivik's manifesto. Breivik, who was responsible for the 2011 Norway attacks, featured her writing in twelve sections of his manifesto, referred to her as a "decent human being," and noted that he had followed Geller's blog "for the better part of a year." As the media began to report on her influence on the attacks, she removed statements from her blog that could have been considered incriminating, including part of an email that she posted in June 2007 describing a stockpile and cache of weapons, ammunition, and equipment being amassed by an Atlas Shrugs reader in Norway.

Geller wrote on her blog that "any assertion" that she or other anti-jihad writers bore any responsibility for Breivik's actions was "ridiculous," and that “If anyone incited him to violence, it was Islamic supremacists.”” She later described the location of the attack, a youth camp on Utoya Island, as "an 'anti-Semitic indoctrination center' where children with a 'clearly pro-Islamic agenda' play war games," citing as evidence a picture of the attendees of the camp claiming they "are more Middle Eastern or mixed than pure Norwegian". Geller also provided a rationale for Breivik's actions that has been described as "If not a defense of Breivik, ... astonishingly close to one":

Breivik was targeting the future leaders of the party responsible for flooding Norway with Muslims who refuse to assimilate, who commit major violence against Norwegian natives, including violent gang rapes, with impunity, and who live on the dole ... all done without the consent of the Norwegians.

=== Political philosophy ===
Geller has been described as "far-right" by news outlets, such as: the Los Angeles Times, Wired, The Huffington Post, The Guardian, Haaretz, BuzzFeed News, The Forward, and human rights activist Leonard Zeskind. Zeskind also classified Geller as a radical right ideologue, racist, and Islamophobic. Geller is a supporter of the far-right English Defence League (EDL), proclaiming: “I share the EDL's goals ... We need to encourage rational, reasonable groups that oppose the Islamisation of the west.” In June 2013, Geller was scheduled to speak at an EDL rally, but was barred from entering Britain by a Home Office ruling that described her as having established "anti-Muslim hate groups." Cited as evidence for the ban were statements categorizing Al-Qaeda as "a manifestation of devout Islam," and stating that jihad requires Jews as an enemy. Geller called the decision “a striking blow against freedom ... The nation that gave the world the Magna Carta is dead.” Hope not Hate, which led a campaign to ban her, applauded the decision, stating: “There is a line in the sand between freedom of speech and the right to use hate speech.”

In economics, Geller favors "right-wing," "small government" fiscal policies of cutting taxes and reducing budgets. She is "socially liberal" in her support of abortion rights and same-sex marriage, but she believes drug legalization goes "too far." Ayn Rand's writings had a big influence on her thought. Unlike Rand, Geller is a theist who defends the Judeo-Christian ethical tradition. In her rhetorical style, she shares Rand's "verbal excesses," accompanied by a "willingness to provoke and offend."

=== Israel ===
Geller is an ardent Zionist. She encouraged Israel to “stand loud and proud. Give up nothing. Turn over not a pebble. For every rocket fired, drop a MOAB. Take back Gaza. Secure Judea and Samaria. Stop buying Haaretz. Throw leftists bums out,” referring to the Israeli-occupied West Bank as "Judea and Samaria". She regards much of the Israeli media as "Jewicidal," and the kibbutz movement as a failed idea and a variety of slavery.

=== Barack Obama conspiracy theories ===
Geller has put forth a number of conspiracy theories and falsehoods about Barack Obama. She has claimed he is a Muslim, and that he was born in Kenya. She published a reader's letter speculating that Obama's mother was involved in pornography, that his "spiritual father" was a child rapist, that Obama "was involved with a crack whore in his youth," and that Malcolm X had impregnated Obama's mother. She has accused Obama of appointing Muslims to government positions who may have ties to Muslim extremists and want to undermine the United States. She accused the State Department in the Obama administration of being run by "Islamic supremacists." She wrote in a 2010 book (co-authored with Robert Spencer) that "Barack Hussein Obama" was pursuing the “implementation of a soft sharia: the quiet and piecemeal implementation of Islamic laws that subjugate non-Muslims.”

In July 2010, she published a book with Robert Spencer, The Post-American Presidency: The Obama Administration's War on America, which criticized the Obama administration.

=== Genocide conspiracy theories ===
According to a 2013 study of the Srebrenica genocide, Geller “is among the most vociferous revisionists” of the genocide. She denies the genocide of Bosniaks in Srebrenica, describing it as the "Srebrenica Genocide Myth." She has defended Slobodan Milošević, who died while standing trial for war crimes in the Bosnian War, and denied the existence of Serbian concentration camps. She claimed that the 1999 NATO intervention in Kosovo was "in order to pave the way for an Islamic state in the heart of Europe—Kosovo."

She has been critical of the Muslim Rohingya people, who are an ethnic minority in Myanmar that have been subjected to genocide and ethnic cleansing. She has blamed the Rohingya for the violence in Myanmar, said that the inhabitants of Myanmar "have every right to be concerned" about the Rohingya, claimed "Muslims are waging jihad in Burma," accused the Rohingya of "circulating fake pictures," and directed her readers to a book called The Rohingya Hoax.

She has published articles advancing the false conspiracy theory of a white genocide in South Africa.

== Personal life ==
Geller was married to Michael Oshry from 1990 until the couple divorced in 2007. She received nearly $4 million in the divorce settlement. Michael died of a heart attack in 2008. As part of his life-insurance policy, his daughters gained $5 million. Pamela and Michael had four daughters: Claudia, Jackie, Olivia, and Margo Oshry. The four of them are social media influencers, running the Girl With No Job account on Instagram, and a Facebook Live/YouTube show called The Morning Toast.

She lives in Hewlett, New York, and Sutton Place, New York.

== Bibliography ==
- The Post-American Presidency: The Obama Administration's War on America, Pamela Geller with Robert Spencer, foreword by (former) Ambassador John R. Bolton, (Simon & Schuster, July 2010) ISBN 978-1-4391-8930-6
- Stop the Islamization of America: A Practical Guide for the Resistance. WND Books. 2011. ISBN 9781936488360.
- Freedom or Submission: On the Dangers of Islamic Extremism & American Complacency, Pamela Geller, (CreateSpace Independent Publishing Platform, April 3, 2013) ISBN 978-1-484019-65-8
- Fatwa: Hunted in America, Pamela Geller, (Dangerous Books), November 1, 2017 ISBN 978-1-947979-00-0
