= Stop Islamization of America =

Political advocacy organization

- Abbreviation: SIOA/AFDI
- Formation: 2010
- Tax ID no.: 27-2518993
- President: Pamela Geller
- Co-founder: Robert Spencer
- Website: Inactive (see archived versions )
- Formerly called: American Freedom Defense Initiative

Stop Islamization of America (SIOA), also known as the American Freedom Defense Initiative (AFDI), is an anti-Muslim, (Note: Multiple references:) pro-Israel American counter-jihad organization known primarily for its controversial, Islamophobic advertising campaigns. The group has been described as extremist and far-right. The Southern Poverty Law Center (SPLC) lists SIOA as an anti-Muslim hate group.

SIOA was founded in 2010 by its current leaders, Pamela Geller and author Robert Spencer, at the request of Anders Gravers Pedersen, the leader of Stop Islamisation of Europe, of which it is the American affiliate. It has launched ad campaigns in urban public transit systems, including one in New York City opposing Park51, a Muslim community center that had been proposed for Lower Manhattan near the World Trade Center site in 2010. In 2016, they ran public transit advertisements in San Francisco calling for the end of United States security assistance to the Palestinian National Authority.

== Ideology ==
SIOA describes itself as a human rights organization, promoting freedom of speech, freedom of conscience, and equal rights. The SIOA's ideology has been called Islamophobic by political and historical scholars, news sources, religious leaders, and hate group watchdogs. (Note: Multiple references:)

== History ==
=== 2010 ===
SIOA opposed the construction of Park51, originally named Cordoba House, a 13-story Muslim community center proposed for a location two blocks from the World Trade Center site in Lower Manhattan. On May 6, 2010, Geller posted a blog piece calling the building a "monster mosque" and a "stab in the eye of America" and comparing it to the reconsecration of the Hagia Sophia as a mosque by the Ottoman Turks after they conquered Constantinople in 1453. In another blog post, Geller encouraged readers to protest its construction.

In July 2010, the organization purchased bus advertising in New York and other American cities promoting a website purporting to advocate for Muslims who wanted to disclaim their religion but who feared they might be killed by other Muslims if they did so. The Council on American-Islamic Relations criticized the premise of the ads, that there were any such Muslims, calling it "a smoke screen to advance [Geller's] long-standing history of anti-Muslim bigotry".

The Anti-Defamation League, beginning in 2010, included SIOA in their online resource on extremist groups, saying that it "promotes a conspiratorial anti-Muslim agenda under the guise of fighting radical Islam" and "seeks to rouse public fears by consistently vilifying the Islamic faith and asserting the existence of an Islamic conspiracy to destroy 'American' values."

=== 2011 ===
In 2011, the Southern Poverty Law Center named SIOA an anti-Muslim hate group, calling it a "propaganda powerhouse" that paints moderate Muslims as radical terrorists. Geller described the SPLC listing as a "badge of honor" and later, in 2015, stated to CNN, "Who designated the SPLC as a legitimate authority? They are a radical leftist group who targets patriots, vets and even GOP presidential candidates. They have never named a jihadi group as a hate group."

In July and August 2011, Geller and Spencer were discussed in the media because Norwegian terrorist Anders Behring Breivik's anti-Muslim manifesto quoted Spencer at length, and also cited Geller's blog. According to Heidi Beirich, deputy director of SPLC, Geller and Spencer's writings were "the primary sources for the anti-Muslim propaganda that had helped give voice" to Breivik's 1500+ page manifesto. SIOA published a statement jointly with Jihad Watch and Stop Islamisation of Europe condemning Breivik's attack.

=== 2012 ===
In 2012, SIOA sponsored ads in the public transit systems of New York City, Washington, D.C., and Chicago reading, "In any war between the civilized man and the savage, support the civilized man. Support Israel. Defeat Jihad." The New York Metropolitan Transportation Authority (MTA) initially refused to display them. The authority's decision was ruled unconstitutional by Judge Paul A. Engelmayer of the United States District Court for the Southern District of New York in July 2012. Judge Engelmayer held that SIOA's ad was "core political speech" protected by the First Amendment. (Note: Multiple references:)

Rabbis for Human Rights, the Sojourners Community, and United Methodist Women all sponsored subway ads countering SIOA's original ad and promoting religious tolerance. The Jewish Council for Public Affairs called SIOA's ad "bigoted, divisive, and unhelpful", and Steve Gutow, its president, said, "The fact that ads have been placed in the subway attacking Israel does not excuse the use of attack ads against Muslims." William McGurn, a former speechwriter for George W. Bush, wrote an op-ed in the Wall Street Journal supporting the ads, arguing that "savage" was an appropriate term to describe jihadists, and criticizing "our new political correctness".

During the 2012 tax year, the organization reported total revenue of $157,870.00, no employee salary or compensation, and total operating expenses of $296,044.00.

=== 2013 ===
In early January 2013, the SIOA placed advertisements in New York City Subway stations that juxtaposed images of the September 11 attacks with a quote from the Quran: "Soon shall we cast terror into the hearts of the unbelievers." By that time the New York City Transit Authority had changed its advertising policy to accept what it called "viewpoint advertisements" but to require a disclaimer saying that the Transit Authority did not endorse the advertiser's views.

In the fiscal year 2013, the organization disclosed a complete revenue amounting to $958,800.00. Employee wages and benefits stood at $243,150.00, while the overall operational costs totaled $419,652.00.

=== 2014 ===
In response to an ad by the American Muslims for Palestine that the SIOA called "Jew-hating", the SIOA sponsored an ad on Washington, D.C., buses with a photograph of Adolf Hitler and Haj Amin al-Husseini, the Grand Mufti of Jerusalem who supported the Nazi dictator before and during World War II.

In May, the U.S. Court of Appeals for the Federal Circuit ruled that the U.S. Patent and Trademark Office was not required to grant SIOA a trademark registration for its name because it could be disparaging to American Muslims. Geller criticized the ruling, calling it a "complete whitewash" and describing the court as having a politically correct bias.

=== 2015 ===
In 2015 the SIOA started a new ad campaign in New York, that included one parody billboard with a quote from Hamas stating 'Killing Jews is worship that draws us close to Allah.' A court judgement in April 2015 ruled that New York's Metropolitan Transportation Authority cannot prevent the ads from running on buses.

In January 2015 a Muslim group organized a fundraiser called "Stand With the Prophet in Honor and Respect" at the Curtis Culwell Center in Garland, Texas. Pamela Geller spearheaded about 1,000 picketers at that event. The Garland Independent School District board president Rick Lambert said in January, "The Culwell Center is available for rental as long as you comply with the law. Because it is a public facility, the district is not allowed to discriminate based upon viewpoint."

==== Garland shooting ====
On May 3, 2015, the SIOA invited Geert Wilders to an art exhibit in Garland, Texas that offered a $10,000 prize for the best cartoon of Muhammad. During the event, a shooting incident occurred. Both gunmen, later identified as ISIL-inspired, were shot and killed by police shortly after the suspects shot a security guard.

The SIOA says it spent $10,000 on security, and had 40 police officers and private security guards present. The event was hosted at the Curtis Culwell Center, rented from the Garland Independent School District, which hosted an event in January called "Stand with the Prophet".

== Stop Islamization of Nations ==
Stop Islamization of Nations (SION) is an international counter-jihad organization founded in 2012 by Pamela Geller and Robert Spencer of SIOA, and Anders Gravers Pedersen of SIOE. Other board members are Debbie Robinson, of Q Society of Australia; Ezra Levant, a Canadian publisher; Wafa Sultan, a Syrian-American writer; Ali Sina, an Iranian-born Canadian activist; Stefan Herre, a German author of the blog Politically Incorrect; Mordechai Kedar, an Israeli author; Babu Suseelan, a Hindu activist; Oskar Freysinger, a Swiss politician; Cliff Kincaid, editor of the Accuracy in Media Report; and Ashraf Rameleh the President of Voice of the Copts. Pamela Geller and Robert Spencer are President and Vice President of SION. SION has taken part in hosting international counter-jihad conferences along with other organisations and multiple individual speakers, including in Stockholm, Sweden and New York City in 2012 and in Melbourne, Australia in 2014.
