= William G. Boykin =

Retired US Army general and political official (born 1948)

William Gerald Boykin
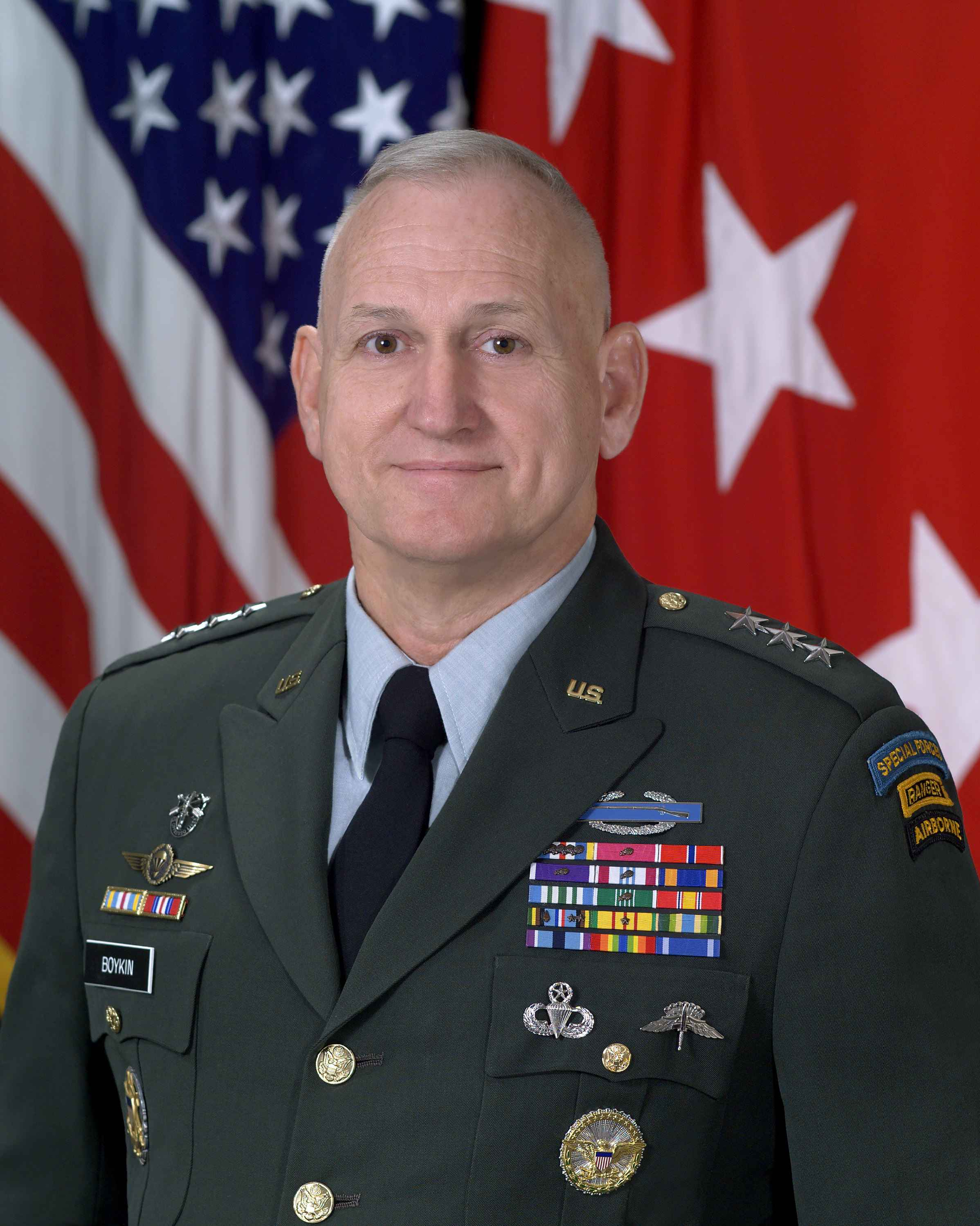
- Born: April 19, 1948 (age 78); Wilson, North Carolina, U.S.
- Military career
- Allegiance: United States of America
- Branch: United States Army
- Service years: 1971–2007
- Rank: Lieutenant General
- Nickname: Jerry
- Commands: Delta Force; 1st Special Forces Command (Airborne); John F. Kennedy Special Warfare Center
- Conflicts: Vietnam War; Operation Eagle Claw; Operation Urgent Fury; Operation Just Cause; Operation Gothic Serpent
- Awards: Combat Infantryman Badge; Defense Distinguished Service Medal; Army Distinguished Service Medal; Defense Superior Service Medal; Legion of Merit; Master Parachutist Badge; Military Freefall Badge; Ranger Tab; Special Forces Tab; Bronze Star; Purple Heart
- Other work: Professor: Hampden–Sydney College; Executive Vice-President: Family Research Council

William Gerald "Jerry" Boykin (born April 19, 1948) is a retired American lieutenant general who was the United States Deputy Undersecretary of Defense for Intelligence under President George W. Bush from 2002 to 2007. During his 36-year career in the military he spent 13 years in the Delta Force and was involved in numerous high-profile missions, including the 1980 Iran hostage rescue attempt, the 1992 hunt for Pablo Escobar in Colombia, and the Black Hawk Down incident in Mogadishu, Somalia. Since his retirement from the U.S. Army, Boykin has become a published author, and from 2007 to 2017, taught as a visiting professor at Hampden–Sydney College in Virginia. He is currently executive vice-president at the Family Research Council.

== Early life ==
Boykin was born on April 19, 1948, in Wilson, North Carolina. He attended New Bern High School and was the captain of the football team. He graduated from Virginia Polytechnic Institute and State University (Virginia Tech) with a bachelor's degree in English in 1971.

== Military career ==
As a young officer, he served in the 2nd Armored Division at Fort Hood, Texas; with the 101st Airborne Division in Vietnam, and as a company commander in the 24th Infantry Division (Mechanized) at Fort Stewart, Georgia. In 1978, at age 29, Boykin volunteered for and completed a specialized selection course for assignment to the 1st Special Forces Operational Detachment – Delta, or Delta Force. He would hold numerous leadership positions in the elite unit, including operations officer, troop commander, squadron commander, deputy commander and finally unit commander from July 1992 to July 1994.

Lieutenant Colonel Lewis H. "Bucky" Burruss, who helped with Delta Force selection in early 1978, recalled that Boykin "had a bad knee and I thought he would never make it....I thought, I hate to see this guy busting his [butt], I don't see how he can make it on this bad road wheel, but he surprised us." Burruss wrote at the time that "Jerry Boykin is a Christian gentleman of the highest order." Boykin believed God had a hand in things: "God led me into the Delta Force....And He said to me, 'This is where you ought to be.'"

In 1980, he was the Delta Force operations officer on the April 24–25 Iranian hostage rescue attempt. Boykin called it "the greatest disappointment of my professional career because we didn't bring home 53 Americans." Despite this, his "faith was strengthened" believing he had witnessed "a miracle": "Not one man who stood with us in the desert and pleaded for God to go with us was killed or even injured that night."

In October 1983, Boykin took part in Operation Urgent Fury, the invasion of the Caribbean island of Grenada. He was wounded by anti-aircraft fire during the Delta helicopter assault on Richmond Hill Prison. In 1989, Boykin participated in the U.S. invasion of Panama as part of the mission to apprehend Manuel Noriega and participated in Operation Acid Gambit. From 1990 to 1991, Boykin attended the Army War College. In 1992 and early 1993, as a colonel, Boykin was in Colombia leading a mission to hunt for drug lord Pablo Escobar. Seymour Hersh later claimed in The New Yorker that there were suspicions within the Pentagon that Boykin's team was going to help assassinate Escobar with the support of U.S. Embassy officials in Colombia. Hersh refers to Mark Bowden's book Killing Pablo, which alleged that the Pentagon believed Boykin intended to break the law and exceed his authority in the operation. Bowden wrote that "within the special ops community...Pablo's death was regarded as a successful mission for Delta, and legend has it that its operators were in on the kill." Hersh quotes an anonymous retired army general as saying, "That's what those guys did. I've seen pictures of Escobar's body that you don't get from a long-range telescope lens. They were taken by guys on the assault team."

In April 1993, Boykin helped advise Attorney General Janet Reno regarding the stand-off at Waco, Texas, between the federal government and the Branch Davidians.

In October 1993, Boykin fought in the Battle of Mogadishu, also referred to as "Black Hawk Down".

Some time afterwards, Boykin served at the Central Intelligence Agency as deputy director of special activities, and was promoted to brigadier general. He was made deputy director for operations, readiness, and mobilization when assigned to the army staff.

From 1998 to 2000, he served as the commanding general, 1st Special Forces Command (Airborne) at Fort Bragg, North Carolina. From 2000 to 2003, he was the commanding general, United States Army John F. Kennedy Special Warfare Center, Fort Bragg, N.C. In June 2003, he was appointed Deputy Under Secretary of Defense for Intelligence under Dr. Stephen Cambone, Under Secretary of Defense for Intelligence.

== Post-retirement ==
Boykin retired on August 1, 2007, and began teaching at Hampden–Sydney College. In May 2016, he wrote on Facebook, "I have been terminated from teaching at Hampden-Sydney College after nine years there," though he and the college later reached agreement on another one-year contract. The college denied it had conducted a campaign to fire Boykin following his recent comments about transgender people using bathrooms, including, "The first man who goes in the restroom with my daughter will not have to worry about surgery."

On July 16, 2012, Family Research Council president Tony Perkins announced that Boykin had been named the group's Executive Vice-President.

== Awards and decorations ==
Boykin attended Armed Forces Staff College, Army War College, and Shippensburg University (where he received a master's degree).

U.S. military decorations
Defense Distinguished Service Medal
Army Distinguished Service Medal
Defense Superior Service Medal (with 4 oak leaf clusters)
Legion of Merit (with 2 oak leaf clusters)
Bronze Star Medal
Purple Heart with oak leaf cluster
Defense Meritorious Service Medal (with oak leaf clusters)
Air Medal
Joint Service Commendation Medal
Army Commendation Medal (with oak leaf cluster)
U.S. Unit Awards
Joint Meritorious Unit Award
Valorous Unit Award
U.S. Service (Campaign) Medals and Service and Training Ribbons
National Defense Service Medal (with 3 service star)
Armed Forces Expeditionary Medal (with Arrowhead device and two service stars)
Vietnam Service Medal (with bronze campaign star)
Global War on Terrorism Service Medal
Korea Defense Service Medal
Armed Forces Service Medal
Humanitarian Service Medal
Army Service Ribbon
Army Overseas Service Ribbon
NATO Medal for the Former Yugoslavia

Badges
Combat Infantryman Badge
Master Parachutist Badge
Military Freefall Parachutist Badge
Special Forces Tab
Ranger Tab
German Parachutist Badge in bronze
Joint Staff Identification Badge
US Army Special Forces Combat Service Identification Badge
Army Special Forces Distinctive Unit Insignia
Office of the Secretary of Defense Identification Badge
? Overseas Service Bars

== Personal views ==
=== 2003 speech controversy ===
Boykin, a born-again Christian with conservative political views, has gained attention for his use of religious imagery to comment on political and social issues over the years; some of his public remarks, which cast the war on terror in religious terms, generated considerable controversy.

In an October 2003 speech to a community church in Oregon, Boykin was recorded stating that Islamic extremists hate the United States "because we're a Christian nation, because our foundation and our roots are Judeo-Christians. ... And the enemy is a guy named Satan." William Arkin, military analyst for NBC News, was the source of the video and audiotapes of Boykin. The following day the Los Angeles Times ran a piece on Boykin. Among several quotes, the article revealed Boykin giving a speech about hunting down Osman Atto in Mogadishu: "He went on CNN and he laughed at us, and he said, 'They'll never get me because Allah will protect me. Allah will protect me.' Well, you know what? I knew that my God was bigger than his. I knew that my God was a real God and his was an idol." Boykin later said that he was implying that Atto's true "god" was money.

Boykin's remarks were denounced—Arab and Muslim organizations within the US were highly critical of the comments. James Zogby, president of the Arab American Institute, the Council on American-Islamic Relations, and a number of commentators called for his resignation. Several publications, such as Newsweek, similarly carried articles calling for his resignation. Senators John Kerry (D-MA) and Joe Lieberman (D-CT) were quick to denounce the remarks. Senate Armed Services Committee Chairman John Warner (R-VA) and Democrat Carl Levin both urged Secretary of Defense Donald Rumsfeld to launch an investigation. Rep. John Conyers (D-MI) and 26 supporters put forward H. RES. 419 "Condemning religiously intolerant remarks and calling on the President to clearly censure and reassign Lieutenant General Boykin".

President George W. Bush distanced himself from the statements, saying that Boykin didn't "reflect my point of view or the point of view of this administration." Donald Rumsfeld defended Boykin, describing him as "an officer that has an outstanding record in the United States armed forces", and that the war on terrorism was "not a war against a religion".

Marine General Peter Pace, Vice Chairman of the Joint Chiefs of Staff said that Boykin was later "sad...that his comments created the fury they had," and expressed his belief that Boykin "does not see this battle as a battle between religions; he sees this as a battle between good and evil, the evil being the acts of individuals."

Boykin issued a public statement: "My comments to Osman Otto in Mogadishu were not referencing his worship of Allah but his worship of money and power; idolatry. He was a corrupt man, not a follower of Islam. My references to Judeo-Christian roots in America or our nation as a Christian nation are historically undeniable." CNN later revealed that several parts of his statement were removed on the advice of Pentagon attorneys. Among the parts removed was Boykin's assertion that "the sensitivities of my job today dictate that further church speeches are inappropriate", and "As a Christian, I believe that there is a spiritual war that is continuous as articulated in the Bible. It is not confined to the war of terrorism."

Boykin then requested an investigation by an inspector general into the allegations. A ten-month investigation carried out by the Department of Defense concluded in August 2004 that Boykin had broken three rules in giving the speeches: that he did not clarify that he gave the remarks in a private capacity, that he hadn't received clearance for making the remarks, and that he hadn't declared the reimbursement of travel funds given to him by one of the religious groups hosting the speaking events. However, the report made no comment on the actual remarks made, and little action was taken against Boykin. An anonymous senior Pentagon official said that the infractions were relatively minor and rarely led to prosecution. The report defended the decision not to comment on Boykin's actual comments for several reasons, primarily because "freedom of expression considerations under the First Amendment to the U.S. Constitution apply in this case."

=== Other comments and activities ===
On September 26, 2009, Boykin gave an address at a How to Take Back America Conference in St. Louis, Missouri, hosted by the Eagle Forum. According to the Canada Free Press, Boykin asked the audience: "What are you prepared to give up for America? Are you willing to pay the ultimate price?" and said, "there is no greater threat to America than Islam". Boykin has been described as part of the counter-jihad movement.

In 2010, Boykin was one of two "team leaders" of Team B II which released a report entitled Shariah: The Threat To America: An Exercise In Competitive Analysis, published by the Center for Security Policy, which William Arkin and Dana Priest have described as "a Washington-based neoconservative think tank." The other team leader was Harry Soyster, a retired lieutenant general and former Director of the Defense Intelligence Agency; that team included R. James Woolsey, Jr., former CIA Director; and CSP President Frank Gaffney, Jr., former Assistant Secretary of Defense for International Security Policy (Acting). The book "describes what its authors call a 'stealth jihad' that must be thwarted before it's too late," and argues that "most mosques in the United States already have been radicalized, that most Muslim social organizations are fronts for violent jihadists and that Muslims who practice sharia law seek to impose it in this country." According to an opinion piece in the Washington Post, "Government terrorism experts call the views expressed in the center's book inaccurate and counterproductive."

Boykin is listed as a board member of The Oak Initiative, a conservative Christian group that describes itself as "a grassroots movement to Unite, Mobilize, Equip, and Activate Christians to be the salt and light they are called to be by engaging in the great issues of our time from a sound biblical worldview." Other board members include Rick Joyner, founder of Morningstar Ministries and Heritage International Ministries; and Rev. Louis P. Sheldon, chairman of the Traditional Values Coalition.

Boykin is listed as the Grand Chancellor of the Knights Hospitallers of the Sovereign Order of St. John of Jerusalem, Knights of Malta, a self-styled order of chivalry claiming relation to the historical Knights Hospitaller.

In January 2013, the retired general received a letter of reprimand from then-Vice Chief of Staff of the United States Army Lloyd Austin for disclosing classified information in his book Never Surrender: A Soldier's Journey to the Crossroads of Faith and Freedom.

In February 2014, Boykin said in a speech that he believed that Jesus will return to Earth carrying an AR-15 assault rifle. Alluding to a biblical passage in which Jesus says, "I came not to bring peace but to bring a sword", Boykin said, "I believe now that the sword he'll be carrying when he comes back is an AR-15."

In another 2014 speech, Boykin said Jews are the "cause of all the problems in the world", which the Southern Poverty Law Center characterized as "an awkward attempt at humor". During that speech, he also asserted President Barack Obama had sent "subliminal messages" to Muslims during his 2009 A New Beginning speech in Cairo.

During the 2016 presidential election campaign, Boykin first advised Sen. Ted Cruz. Then, on September 6, 2016, he endorsed Republican presidential nominee Donald Trump.

Boykin has endorsed the conspiracy theory that the 2020 presidential election was rigged to favor Joe Biden and claims that the United States "has taken a hard left turn toward Socialism and a Marxist form of tyrannical government."

On April 11, 2021, Boykin was one of 124 retired U.S. military flag officers who signed the "Open Letter from Retired Generals and Admirals" that raised concerns of the survival of the United States as a constitutional republic. The letter claims that the country "has taken a hard left turn toward Socialism and a Marxist form of tyrannical government."

=== War on terror tactics ===
The New York Times reported on March 18, 2006, that, when asked by Under Secretary of Defense for Intelligence Stephen Cambone to "get to the bottom" of abuses committed by an elite counterinsurgency task force, Boykin found no pattern to them, despite ample evidence to the contrary.

A December 9, 2003, item in The Guardian connected Boykin with secret Israeli counterinsurgency assistance in Iraq, allegedly including assassination squads. In another Guardian article, Sidney Blumenthal, President Bill Clinton's former senior adviser and current Washington bureau chief for Salon.com, claimed that towards the end of 2003, it was Boykin who, under Donald Rumsfeld's orders, advised then Camp X-Ray head Major General Geoffrey Miller in Guantanamo to transfer the same Camp X-Ray methods to Abu Ghraib and the Iraqi prison system.

In 2003, Seymour Hersh claimed in the New Yorker that Boykin was a key planner, along with Stephen Cambone, behind Rumsfeld's Special Forces approach to fighting the war on terror. Furthermore, when Boykin was questioned in a congressional inquiry regarding similarities between current war on terror special operations and U.S.'s Phoenix Program during the Vietnam War, he said, "I think we're running that kind of program. We're going after these people. Killing or capturing these people is a legitimate mission for the department. I think we're doing what the Phoenix Program was designed to do, without all of the secrecy."

In 2005, Hersh claimed that the U.S. had begun to undertake secret, off-the-books, covert missions in Iran to identify key targets for possible strikes in destabilizing its nuclear facilities, and against the larger war on terror, with the chain of command for the commando operations falling to Rumsfeld, Cambone, and Boykin.

== Bibliography ==
- Special Operations and Low-Intensity Conflict Legislation: Why Was It Passed and Have the Voids Been Filled ? (Report). US Army War College, Carlisle Barracks. 1991. OCLC 36734112.
- Never Surrender: A Soldier's Journey to the Crossroads of Faith and Freedom. Co-authored with Vincent, Lynn. FaithWords. 2008. ISBN 978-0446582155.
- Shariah: The Threat To America: An Exercise In Competitive Analysis. Co-authored as Team B II. Center for Security Policy Press. 2010. ISBN 978-0982294765.
- Kiloton Threat: A Novel. Co-authored with Morrisey, Tom. B&H. 2011. ISBN 978-0805449549.
- The Coalition: A Novel. Co-authored with Saleem, Kamal. Post Hill. 2014. ISBN 978-1618689498.
- The Secure Freedom Strategy: A Plan for Victory Over the Global Jihad Movement. Co-authored as The Tiger Team. Center for Security Policy Press. 2015. ISBN 978-1507756133.
- The Warrior Soul: Five Powerful Principles to Make You a Stronger Man of God. Co-authored with Weber, Stu. Charisma House. 2015. ISBN 978-1629980164.
- Danger Close: A Novel. Co-authored with Morrisey, Tom. Fidelis. 2019. ISBN 978-0805449556.
- Man to Man: Rediscovering Masculinity in a Challenging World. Co-authored with Gilbert, Lela. Post Hill. 2020. ISBN 978-1642933680.
- The Principles of War. Co-authored with Joyner, Rick. MorningStar. 2022. ISBN 978-1607086680.
- Strong and Courageous: A Call to Biblical Manhood. Co-authored with Cureton, Kenyn. Fidelis. 2022. ISBN 978-1736620687.
