= Diana West =

American journalist

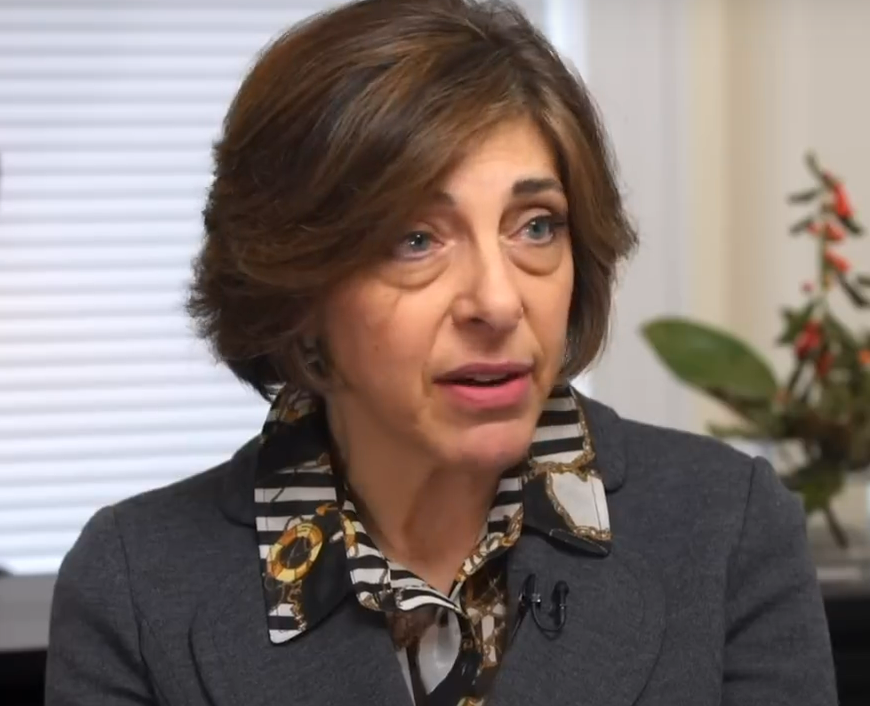
- West in 2020
- Born: November 8, 1961 (age 64); Hollywood, California, U.S.
- Education: Yale University (BA)
- Occupations: Author, columnist

Diana West (born November 8, 1961) is an American conservative author and former columnist. She wrote a weekly column from 1998 until 2014 that was syndicated nationally. Her books include The Death of the Grownup (2007) and American Betrayal (2013).

== Early and personal life ==
West was born and raised in Hollywood, Los Angeles to Elliot West, a conservative novelist and television and screenplay writer, and Barbara Belden, a one-time actress. She moved to the East Coast and graduated from Yale University with a Bachelor of Arts in 1983. She has two daughters, and has later lived in Washington, D.C.

== Career ==
West was an editor of Yale Political Monthly while an undergraduate student at Yale, and later went to New York City to work as a junior editor of The Public Interest, which was edited by Irving Kristol. She thereafter began working as a reporter for The Washington Times, and won the first prize in 1990 for best feature writing by the National Newspaper Association for a two-part story on the scientific fraud controversy around Nobel prizewinner David Baltimore. She began writing her weekly column in 1998. The column was later syndicated in about 120 newspapers and news sites, until it was ended in 2014. It often dealt with controversial subjects such as the war on terror with a critical focus on Islam.

As a former CNN contributor, she frequently appeared on Lou Dobbs' shows Lou Dobbs Tonight and Lou Dobbs This Week. She has also been published in The Wall Street Journal, The Weekly Standard, The New Criterion and The Atlantic Monthly, and has written her own blog.

West has also been co-vice president of the International Free Press Society, and been described as part of the counter-jihad movement, a movement which she has praised in her column, including the blog Gates of Vienna. In 2010 she was a co-author of the Center for Security Policy's Team B II report Shariah: The Threat To America. She has also been a contributor to Breitbart News.

== The Death of the Grownup ==
West published her first book, The Death of the Grownup: How America's Arrested Development Is Bringing Down Western Civilization in 2007. The book argues that "Americans have become overly complacent with the world around us, particularly the ideological conflicts between Islam and the West, as a result of our desire to perpetuate our youth."

=== Reviews ===
A Kirkus review said the book "offers a bright, readable, often overwrought indictment of a popular culture that keeps Americans in a state of perpetual adolescence". Christopher Orlet, writing in the American Spectator, argued that "West does not advocate a return to some golden pre-war era, but she does prescribe a booster shot of old-fashioned adult values. Sounding refreshingly like our parents and grandparents before them, West warns that we need to grow up and get serious about life."

Writing in The New York Times Book Review, William Grimes observed that "West makes a principled, conservative cultural argument unflinchingly" throughout the text. Grimes concluded that "West, in her style of argument, shows herself to be more a child of the 1960s than she might care to admit. In the end the facts matter less than the emotions." He also thought West's discussion about a failure to confront Islam was awkwardly fit for the book's topic.

In the Michigan Review, Rebecca Christy "agreed with the common topics of American pop culture West covers", but found that "the flow of this book … is stopped abruptly, though, when West begins a discussion of Islamic terrorism." Stefan Beck, for The New Criterion argued that "West may get hysterical at times, but the most significant aspects of her argument are all but undeniable. Values have indeed replaced virtues." A writer for Publishers Weekly noted that West presents "nothing less than the decline of Western civilization on the American counterculture."

== American Betrayal ==
West's second book, American Betrayal: The Secret Assault on Our Nation's Character, was published in 2013. West argues that after the fall of the Soviet Union, historians failed to sufficiently "adjust the historical record" to account for newly available Soviet files and archives. West writes on the extent of Soviet influence during the Roosevelt and Truman administrations. She argues that infiltration of the American government by Stalinist agents and fellow-travelers had significantly altered Allied policies in favor of the Soviet Union during World War II.

=== Reviews and responses ===
Frank J. Gaffney Jr. finds that West "painstakingly documents how America's government, media, academia, political and policy elites actively helped obscure the true nature of the Soviet Union." West contends that there is a parallel with the failure to face the dangers of communism in the 1930s and the failure to face the threat of Islamic extremism today.

Frank T. Csongos argues that West is right "up to a point". He notes that West rejects the standard narrative that Franklin Roosevelt, like George W. Bush, took drastic steps to "save capitalism". Unlike West, he believes that Roosevelt was merely naive when trusting Joseph Stalin.

A Kirkus review finds that she has a number of valid points but her additional doubtful speculations go too far. It notes that, "Not until the 1990s, with access to the Venona files and Soviet archives, have historians wholly appreciated the scope of Russian spying in this country from the time FDR formally recognized the Soviet Union in 1933. West matches these new revelations to previously known facts and wonders why we’ve neglected to fully adjust the historical record." It ends with the warning: "A frustrating mixture of incontrovertible facts and dubious speculation. Proceed with caution."

Former Canadian newspaper publisher and Franklin D. Roosevelt biographer Conrad Black published a critique of American Betrayal in the conservative journal National Review in late 2013, to which West responded and Black then rejoined. Like Radosh, Black believes West grossly exaggerates Soviet influence in the Roosevelt Administration, whose policies were driven by the extreme social and economic crisis America was going through during the Depression. Black believes the alliance with the Soviet Union in World War II, while driven by realpolitik, was a dire necessity to prevent the victory of Nazi Germany which had already conquered France and was threatening Britain, and finds West's dismissal of the D-Day invasion of Normandy as somehow the result of Soviet subterfuge to shift the strategic thrust from the campaign in Italy to be an absurd and amateurish contention that ignores the realities of logistics and terrain. All these authors also point out that for the first two years of World War 2 during the period of the Stalin-Hitler Pact, widely considered odious among liberals, the policy of the FDR administration was at loggerheads with that of the Soviets in aiding Britain through Lend-Lease and point out the irony that at that time communists allied with isolationists and the America First movement, whose legacy West extols.

Jonathan Chait, a liberal pundit and writer for New York magazine, says that West's "thesis that American foreign policy under presidents Roosevelt, Truman, and Eisenhower was secretly controlled by the Soviet Union" has found supporters at The Heritage Foundation and The American Spectator.

Andrew C. McCarthy also came to West's defense in a review-essay in The New Criterion, where he writes West relies on M. Stanton Evans' book that comes to the defense of Senator Joseph McCarthy and cites the "groundbreaking scholarship of John Earl Haynes and Harvey Klehr" to back up Evans' claims.

Harvey Klehr and John Earl Haynes claim West made serious historical errors, the most egregious being that Harry Hopkins was the Soviet spy "source 19" named in the Venona transcripts, who they believe the evidence shows was actually Laurence Duggan, a U.S. Department of State official.

== Bibliography ==
- The Death of the Grownup: How America's Arrested Development Is Bringing Down Western Civilization. St. Martin's Griffin. 2007. ISBN 978-0312340490.
- Shariah: The Threat To America: An Exercise In Competitive Analysis. Co-authored as Team B II. Center for Security Policy Press. 2010. ISBN 978-0982294765.
- American Betrayal: The Secret Assault on Our Nation's Character. St. Martin's Press. 2013. ISBN 978-0312630782.
- The Rebuttal: Defending 'American Betrayal' from the Book-Burners. Bravura Books. 2013. ISBN 978-1492884538.
- No Fear: Selected Columns from America's Most Politically Incorrect Journalist. Bravura Books. 2013. ISBN 978-1484180228.
- The Red Thread: A Search for Ideological Drivers Inside the Anti-Trump Conspiracy. Center for Security Policy Press. 2019. ISBN 978-1076939630.
