= James Lyons (admiral) =

United States admiral

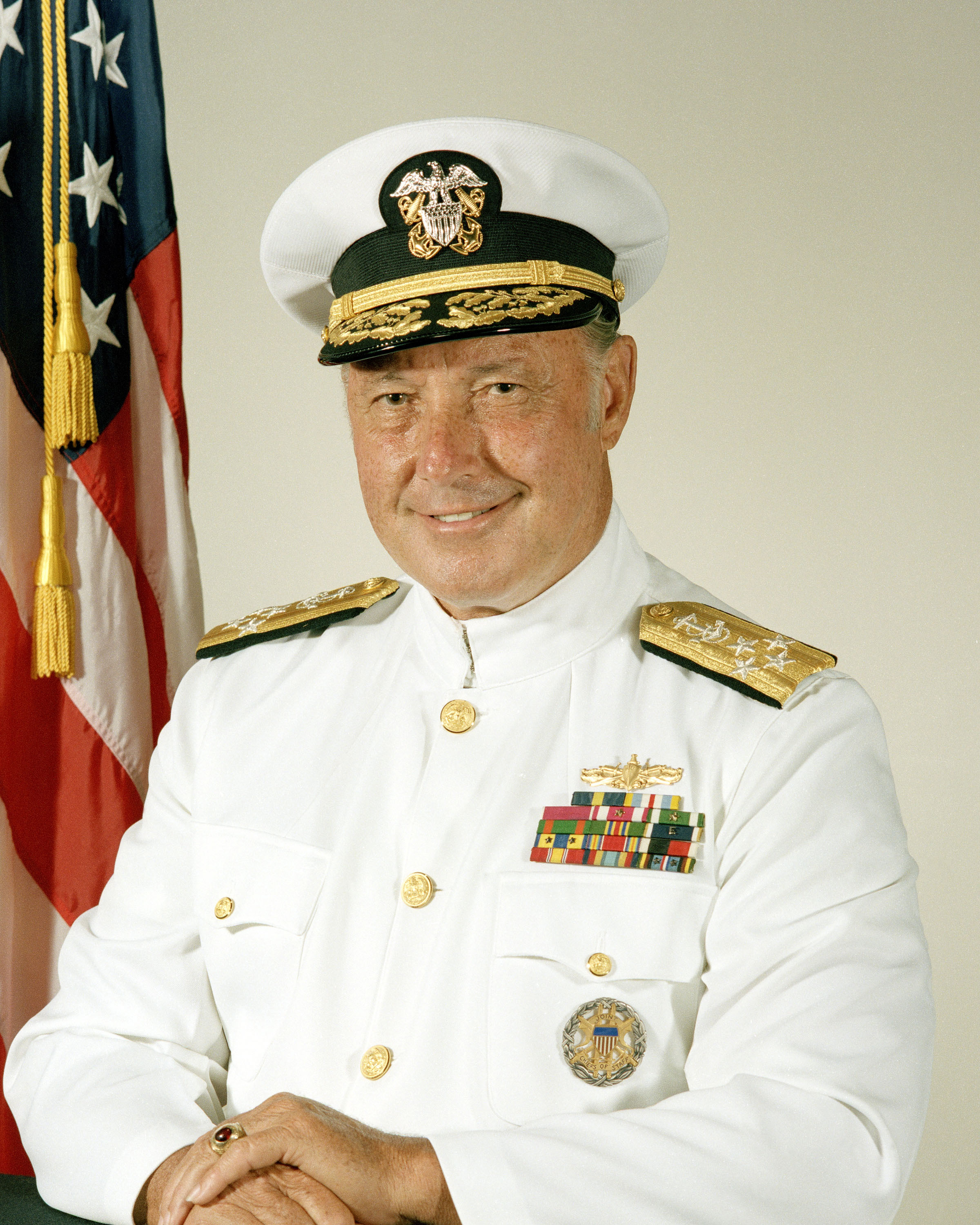
- Born: James Aloysius Lyons Jr. September 28, 1927; New Jersey, U.S.
- Died: December 12, 2018 (aged 91); Warrenton, Virginia, U.S.
- Military career
- Allegiance: United States
- Branch: United States Navy
- Service years: 1952–1987
- Rank: Admiral
- Commands: Commander, U.S. Pacific Fleet
- Conflicts: Cold War
- Awards: Distinguished Service Medal (2); Defense Superior Service Medal; Legion of Merit; Meritorious Service Medal (2); Commendation Medal (2)

James Aloysius "Ace" Lyons Jr. (September 28, 1927 – December 12, 2018) was an admiral in the United States Navy who served as Commander, U.S. Pacific Fleet from 1985 to 1987. He later served as chairman of the Center for Security Policy's Military Committee.

== Military career ==
James Lyons enlisted in the Navy Reserve shortly after World War II and was appointed to the United States Naval Academy, graduating in 1952. He earned post-graduate degrees from the Naval War College and the National Defense University.

Lyons served in the Navy for over 35 years as a Surface Warfare Officer. He commanded the USS Charles S. Sperry (DD 697) and USS Richmond K. Turner (DLG 20) and fulfilled several on-land assignments. He earned appointments as the Commander in Chief of the U.S. Pacific Fleet, Senior U.S. Military Representative to the United Nations, and Deputy Chief of Naval Operations.

== Later activities ==
In the 2010s Lyons became active in Frank Gaffney's Center for Security Policy (CSP), including its "counterjihad" project. He was a co-author of the CSP "Team B II" report Shariah: The Threat To America in 2010. In 2015, at a launch event for the CSP report The Secure Freedom Strategy: A Plan for Victory Over the Global Jihad Movement, Lyons claimed that Muslim Brotherhood members had infiltrated "every one of our national security agencies," and made reference to the claim that then-CIA director John Brennan allegedly was a secret Muslim convert.

On March 1, 2018, The Washington Times published an opinion column by Lyons about Democratic Party staffer Seth Rich's unsolved murder in Washington D.C., which has frequently been the subject of right-wing conspiracy theories. In the column, Lyons falsely claimed it was "well known in the intelligence circles" that Rich and his brother Aaron sold a trove of non-public Democratic National Committee emails to the news leak media outlet WikiLeaks, whose publication of the confidential messages caused chaos in the Democratic Party during the 2016 United States presidential election. Aaron Rich sued and the article was retracted with an apology.

Lyons died on December 12, 2018. He was 91.
