= Shariah: The Threat to America =

2010 book published by the Center for Security Policy

Shariah: The Threat to America: An Exercise in Competitive Analysis
- Author: Team B II
- Language: English
- Genre: Nonfiction
- Published: 2010
- Publisher: Center for Security Policy
- Publication place: United States
- Pages: 370
- ISBN: 978-0982294765

Shariah: The Threat to America: An Exercise in Competitive Analysis is a book published by the Center for Security Policy (CSP) in 2010.

The report, written by "Team B II", is co-authored by William G. Boykin, Harry Edward Soyster, Henry Cooper, Stephen C. Coughlin, Michael Del Rosso, Frank J. Gaffney Jr., John Guandolo, Clare M. Lopez, Andrew C. McCarthy, Patrick Poole, Joseph E. Schmitz, Tom Trento, J. Michael Waller, R. James Woolsey, Brian Kennedy, James "Ace" Lyons, Christine Brim, David Yerushalmi and Diana West.

== Background ==
The group named itself after the original Team B in the 1970s, a working group that provided a hawkish counterpoint to the softer detente policy toward the Soviet Union favored by the White House during the Gerald Ford administration, which in turn influenced the foreign policy of Ronald Reagan.

== Analysis ==
According to The New Criterion, the report "traces in grim and authoritative detail the many inroads that Muslim supremacists have made in the United States," and is "partly an analysis of how the process of Islamicization proceeds in America" and "partly a wake-up call for Americans who are concerned about salvaging freedom in the face of this new totalitarian threat." According to the report there is "only one thing that can begin to save us: Free speech. Free, unfettered, politically incorrect, informed and precise speech about shariah and the threat it poses to America."

Zack Beauchamp, writing for Vox, has written that the authors of the report "drew on the arguments of a loose intellectual movement" known as the counter-jihad movement who "believe that mainstream scholars of Islam, and counterterrorism experts in governments the world over, have fundamentally misunderstood the nature of the Islamist threat." The report argues "that sharia is fundamentally political; that its aim is to govern the lives of all people, and not just Muslims, by seizing control of the world’s governments," further stating that "it is totalitarian in character, incompatible with our Constitution, and a threat to freedom here and around the world." As a result of the doctrine of abrogation, the report claims that "all Muslims are obligated to conquer the West and replace its governments with an Islamic theocracy called a caliphate." It further asserts that peaceful interpretations of Islam is a form of taqiyya "designed to obscure the true nature of Islam from gullible Westerners."

According to Ross Johnson, writing for the Washington and Lee Journal of Civil Rights and Social Justice, the report "has become the cornerstone publication for the anti-Sharia movement," while noting that the CSP has been "at the forefront of [the] campaign." Fink Steven in the Journal of Islamic and Middle Eastern Multidisciplinary Studies, noted that the report "points its condemnatory finger not only at Muslims. It also accuses American leaders of willful complicity in facilitating the infiltration of shariah, alleging that through 'internal policy as well as public statements, U.S. officials have devised and seek to impose purposefully obscure and counterfactual language, evidently selected to divert American attention away from the Arab/Muslim origins of shariah and the Islamic doctrine of jihad'."

The Southern Poverty Law Center (SPLC) claimed that for the report the "CSP teamed up with some of America’s most notorious anti-Muslim activists" to focus on what they described as the "preeminent totalitarian threat of our time: the legal-political-military doctrine known within Islam as shariah." The report is furthermore described as a "compendium of conspiracy theories and anti-Islamic claims, including the notion that 'many of the most prominent Muslim organizations in America are front groups for the Muslim Brotherhood,' which, the report claims, is trying to implement Sharia law across the U.S. and around the world."

== Follow-up ==
The report was followed up in 2015 by "The Tiger Team's" The Secure Freedom Strategy: A Plan for Victory Over the Global Jihad Movement, which was co-authored by William G. Boykin, Henry F. Cooper, Fred Fleitz, Kevin Freeman, Frank J. Gaffney Jr., Dan Gouré, John Guandolo, Jim Hanson, Brian Kennedy, James "Ace" Lyons, Clare Lopez, Joseph E. Schmitz, Tom Trento, J. Michael Waller, Tommy Waller and David Yerushalmi. The report "fleshed out a broad slate of specific policy actions that could be taken to act on Team B’s diagnosis of the problem," including Muslim immigration ban, deporting Muslims who believe in Sharia, and to shut down most mosques and Muslim organizations in the US for allegedly promoting extremism and being front groups of the Muslim Brotherhood. The plan was endorsed at a CSP conference by Republican Party politicians Newt Gingrich and Ted Cruz. Both reports have been seen to have influenced the Donald Trump administration.
