= Tom Trento =

American activist, radio and web show host

- Born: Thomas Anthony Trento; 1951 or 1952 (age 74–75)
- Education: Ocean County College (AS); Moody Bible Institute (BA); Denver Seminary (MA); Florida Atlantic University
- Occupations: Activist, web show host

Thomas Anthony Trento (born 1951 or 1952) is an American conservative activist, radio and web show host, and founder of the Florida-based counter-jihad group the United West, the successor to the Florida Security Council. He has also been the national security chairman for the Tea Party National Convention.

== Background ==
Trento hails from Jersey, and later studied at the Florida Atlantic University under Walid Phares, a leading scholar of "stealth jihad". The United West website states that he has degrees in Law Enforcement, AS, Ocean County College, Theology, BA, Moody Bible Institute, and Philosophy, MA, Denver Seminary. He received the Carnegie Medal from the Carnegie Hero Fund in 1983 for having rescued an unconscious man from a burning car while he was a seminary student in Denver. He identifies as an evangelical Christian, and was noted as an anti-abortion activist in the late 1980s, who was once arrested for trespassing outside a Denver abortion clinic.

== The United West ==
Together with Florida Republican state representative Adam Hasner, Trento launched the Florida Security Council in 2007, the predecessor to the United West. In 2008, the Florida Security Council took part in distributing the DVD Obsession: Radical Islam's War Against the West, which according to Trento has been "extremely effective in waking people up" to the threat of radical Islam. The associated group Security Research Associates then received funding from the Donors Capital Fund. In 2009, Trento hosted Dutch politician Geert Wilders at a freedom of expression conference. He was one of the co-authors of the Center for Security Policy publication Shariah: The Threat To America in 2010.

The United West was launched in March 2011 at an event that was attended by Donald Trump, who posed for photographs together with Frank Gaffney and Elisabeth Sabaditsch-Wolff. Trento and his group has claimed that the U.S. and the West "are at war with Muslims and Islam" according to the Southern Poverty Law Center, which has designated the group as an anti-Muslim "hate group". The group has been described, and describes itself as a counter-jihad organization, with strong support for Israel, and is based in Lake Worth.

Trento has also been the national security chairman for the Tea Party National Convention, and a director of the Tea Party Founding Fathers.

In 2013, Trento held a controversial speech at an event at the September 11 Memorial in Patriots Park, Venice, Florida, attended by the Venice mayor and public officials, in which he denounced not only radical Islam, but "all Islam". In 2015, he called out Broward County Sheriff Scott Israel at a rally for hiring a "terrorist", due to the sheriff's decision to hire deputy Nezar Hamze, who was also the director of the Florida chapter of the Council on American-Islamic Relations (CAIR).

Trento has later collaborated with former Trump administration Director of the U.S. Immigration and Customs Enforcement (ICE), Tom Homan. In November 2022, the United West organized a private fundraising event at Donald Trump's Mar-a-Lago resort, during which it said it premiered a television program associated with Homan's Defend the Border and Save Lives project.
