= Clare M. Lopez =

Former CIA officer

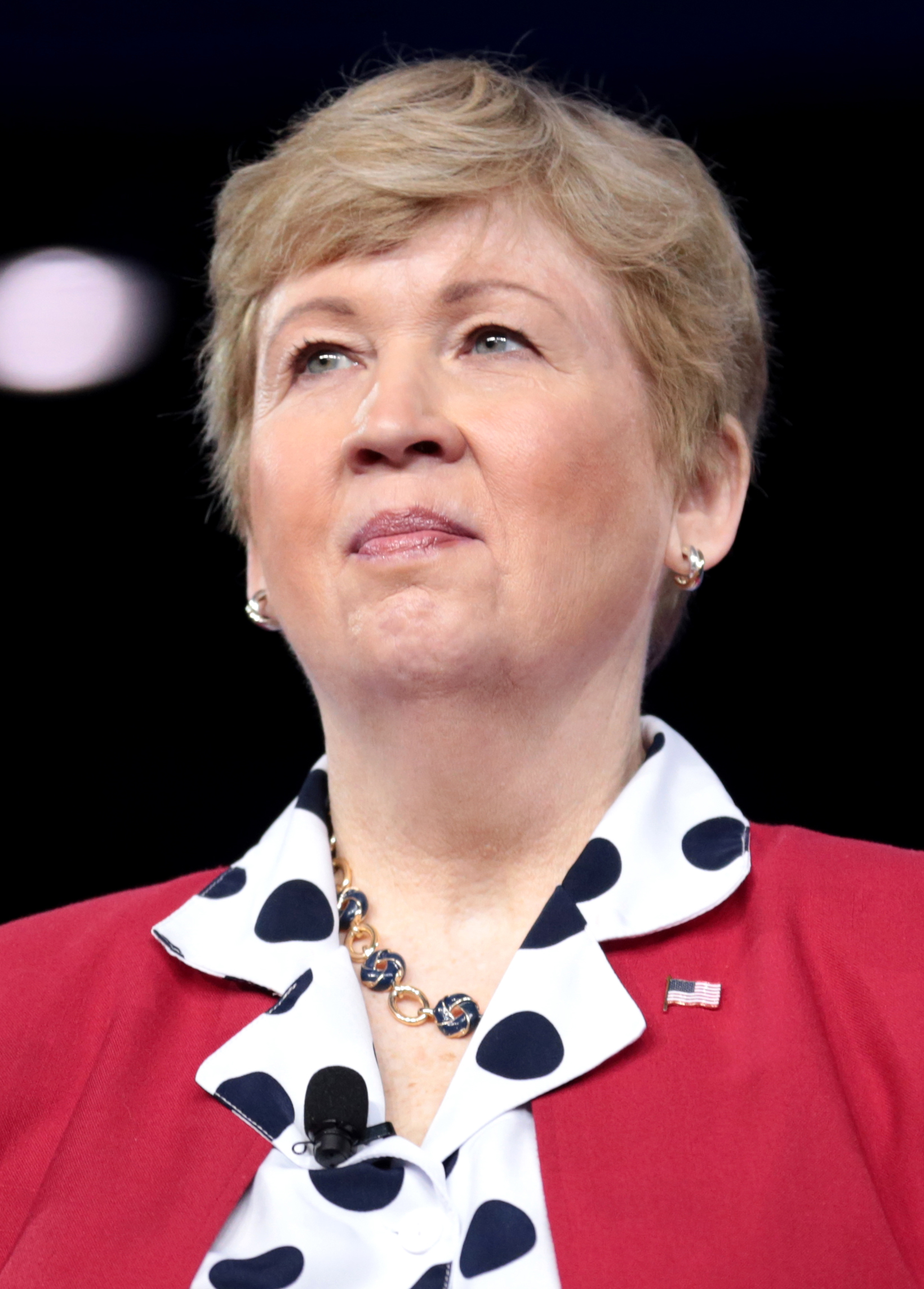
- Lopez in 2017
- Born: 1953 (age 72–73)
- Education: Notre Dame College (BA); Maxwell School of Syracuse University (MA)
- Occupation: National security analyst

Clare M. Lopez (born 1953) is an American former Central Intelligence Agency (CIA) officer who has served as Vice President for Research and Analysis at the Center for Security Policy. She has been described as an anti-Muslim conspiracy theorist by HuffPost and other media outlets.

== Career ==
Lopez received a Bachelor of Arts in communications and French from Notre Dame College, and a Master of Arts in international relations from the Maxwell School of Syracuse University, before completing Marine Corps Officer Candidates School. She then declined a military commission to instead join the Central Intelligence Agency (CIA) as a career operations officer, and has gained deep experience in the Middle East.

During her service she acquired "extensive expertise in counterintelligence, counternarcotics, and counterproliferation issues with a career regional focus on the former Soviet Union, Central and Eastern Europe and the Balkans," and "has served in or visited over two dozen nations worldwide, [and] speaks several languages, including Spanish, Bulgarian, French, German, and Russian." Lopez worked for the CIA for two decades before later joining Frank Gaffney's Center for Security Policy (CSP), where she became Vice President for Research and Analysis from 2014 to 2020. In the CSP she described her work as "project manager" in the "counterjihad movement".

Lopez has also been vice president of the Intelligence Summit, a senior fellow at the Clarion Project, co-founder of the Iran Policy Committee, professor at the Centre for Counterintelligence and Security Studies, Senior Scientific Researcher at the Battelle Memorial Institute, a Senior Intelligence Analyst, Subject Matter Expert, and previously produced Technical Threat Assessments for U.S. Embassies at the Department of State.

== Views and activities ==
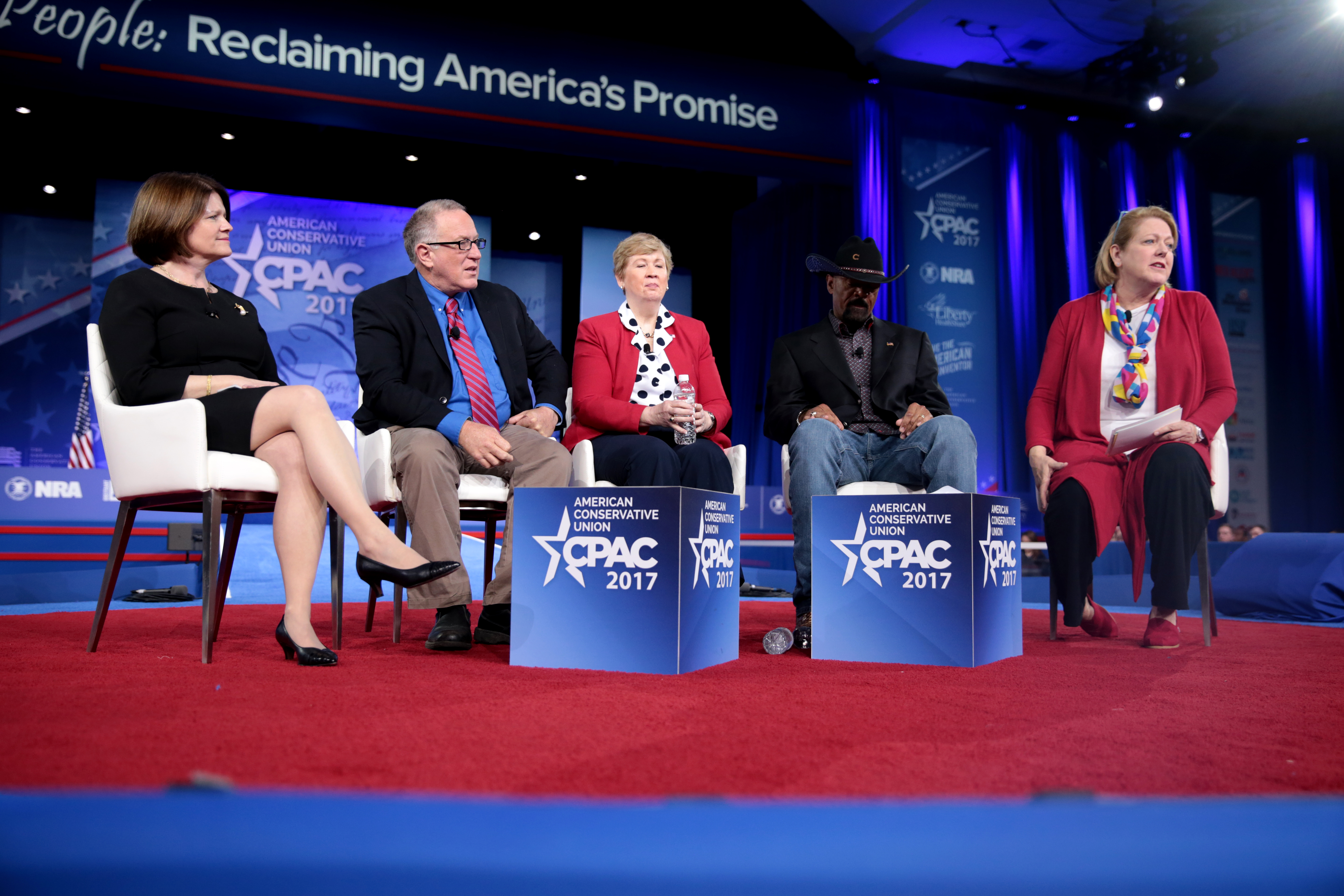
Lopez at the 2017 Conservative Political Action Conference (CPAC)

Lopez has published papers for the Gatestone Institute and the CSP, and given interviews and presentations claiming that the Muslim Brotherhood, which she considers to be a terrorist organization, has "infiltrated the United States government, and that Sharia law is taking hold in American courts." According to Georgetown University's Bridge Initiative, she "believes President Obama and his administration have a 'pattern' of 'enabling' or directly supporting Muslim terrorist groups," and "claims that Obama and Huma Abedin, an aide of former Secretary of State Hillary Clinton, both have ties to the Muslim Brotherhood." She has said that because Obama's father was Muslim, that "de facto makes him [Obama] a Muslim," and that the "Obama administration very clearly has switched sides in the war on terror." Furthermore, she asserts that the Muslim Brotherhood has an "unholy alliance" with the Black Lives Matter movement, that 80% of American mosques promote extremism, and that there are Muslim no-go zones in Minnesota.

Lopez appeared in the documentaries The Third Jihad: Radical Islam's Vision For America in 2008, and Iranium in 2011. She was a co-author of the CSP's Team B II report Shariah: The Threat To America in 2010, and has written for the news websites Breitbart News and WorldNetDaily. In 2015, she was profiled as one of the twelve most "hardline anti-Muslim women activists" in America by the Southern Poverty Law Center. She was an advisor to the Ted Cruz presidential campaign for national security in 2016, and was later reportedly being considered for deputy national security advisor to President-elect Donald Trump. According to a Trump adviser, Lopez was considered "one of the intellectual thought leaders about why we have to fight back against radical Islam." Trump also cited her work to support his proposed Muslim immigration ban.

== Bibliography ==
- Shariah: The Threat To America: An Exercise In Competitive Analysis. Co-authored as Team B II. Center for Security Policy Press. 2010. ISBN 978-0982294765.
- The Secure Freedom Strategy: A Plan for Victory Over the Global Jihad Movement. Co-authored as The Tiger Team. Center for Security Policy Press. 2015. ISBN 978-1507756133.
- The Gulen Movement: Turkey's Islamic Supremacist Cult and its Contributions to the Civilization Jihad. Co-authored with Holton, Christopher. Center for Security Policy Press. 2015. ISBN 978-1522702221.
- See No Sharia: 'Countering Violent Extremism' and the Disarming of America's First Line of Defense. Co-authored with Gaffney, Frank. Center for Security Policy Press. 2016. ISBN 978-1530234332.
- Ally No More: Erdogan's New Turkish Caliphate and the Rising Jihadist Threat to the West. Co-authored with Rhode, Harold; Hull, Christopher C. Center for Security Policy Press. 2018. ISBN 978-1717071675.
