= Stephen Coughlin =

American lawyer and intelligence analyst

- Born: Stephen Collins Coughlin
- Education: University of Minnesota (BA); William Mitchell College of Law (JD); National Defense Intelligence College (MS)
- Occupations: Lawyer, intelligence analyst

Stephen C. Coughlin is an American lawyer and former Joint Chiefs of Staff intelligence analyst who was a contract employee providing advice and analysis at the Pentagon, until he was let go in 2008 under controversial circumstances, reportedly owing to his views on the nature of Islam and the Muslim Brotherhood.

== Early career ==
Coughlin graduated with a Bachelor of Arts in history from the University of Minnesota, and as Juris Doctor from William Mitchell College of Law. A lawyer and military intelligence officer, he was a major in the United States Army Reserve, when in the late 1990s he was tasked with investigating and prosecuting an intellectual property case in Pakistan, following which he became familiar with Sharia law. He was also assigned to U.S. Central Command in Doha, Qatar, and mobilized for Operation Desert Storm in Würzburg, Germany. After the September 11 attacks in 2001, he was mobilized from the private sector to the Intelligence Directorate at the Joint Chiefs of Staff at the Pentagon.

== Joint Chiefs of Staff analyst ==
According to reporter Bill Gertz, Coughlin "led the way in uncovering the truth about the U.S. government's failures to tackle the Islamic threat." Coughlin completed his master's thesis in 2007 at the National Defense Intelligence College, which focused on the Islamic doctrine of jihad as formed by Islamic law, and directly conflicted with the positions of Gordon England's central Muslim outreach Pentagon aide Hesham Islam and others in the U.S. government. In connection with the trial against the Islamic charity Holy Land Foundation for Relief and Development, which had been designated a terrorist organization for providing millions in funds to Hamas, Coughlin wrote a memorandum that explicitly criticized several groups that the U.S. Justice Department had been involved with as part of their Muslim outreach program, identifying them as front groups of the Muslim Brotherhood that were part of a subversion plan against the United States. Coughlin was eventually notified after a meeting at the Pentagon's upper floor which included Islam, who according to Gertz controversially called Coughlin a "Christian zealot", that his contract would not be renewed after March 2008. Pentagon officials however denied that there was any confrontation at the meeting.

One official claimed the decision was due to "budget cuts", but this was not believed by others, including generals and admirals who according to Gertz quietly rallied to support Coughlin. Other officials reportedly said Coughlin had become "too hot" or controversial within the Pentagon, or that "there was no need to exercise the option to extend or renew [his] contract." The decision to not renew his contract proved controversial, and Lt. Col. Joseph C. Myers, Army Advisor to the Air Command and Staff College denounced it as "an act of intellectual cowardice," and stated that the Joint Staff was "losing its only Islamic law scholar if the firing stands." Moreover, Coughlin was praised by retired Air Force Lt. Gen. Thomas McInerney as "the most knowledgeable person in the U.S. government on Islamic law," while Marine Corps Lt. Gen. Samuel Helland said that Coughlin "hit the mark in explaining how jihadists use the Koran to justify their actions."

== Later activities ==
Coughlin speaking at an American Freedom Alliance conference in 2016

Coughlin served as Director of Strategic Communications for Jorge Scientific Corporation after his termination. He was also a Senior Fellow at the Center for Security Policy and a Lincoln Fellow at the Claremont Institute, and lectured at Fort Leavenworth and to the FBI. He has attended Organization for Security and Co-operation in Europe (OSCE) events for the International Civil Liberties Alliance, and participated in the counter-jihad conference in Warsaw in 2013. He is one of the co-founders of Unconstrained Analytics, which publishes counter-jihadist documents, and his 2015 book Catastrophic Failure: Blindfolding America in the Face of Jihad has also been "very influential" in the movement. He has in addition been on the advisory board of the International Free Press Society, and vice president of the Strategic Engagement Group alongside former FBI agent John Guandolo. In 2016 he spoke at an American Freedom Alliance conference, and at the national ACT for America conference.

== Bibliography ==
- Shariah: The Threat To America: An Exercise In Competitive Analysis. Co-authored as Team B II. Center for Security Policy Press. 2010. ISBN 978-0982294765.
- Catastrophic Failure: Blindfolding America in the Face of Jihad. Center for Security Policy Press. 2015. ISBN 978-1511617505.
- "Bridge-Building" to Nowhere: The Catholic Church's Case Study in Interfaith Delusion. Center for Security Policy Press. 2015. ISBN 978-1519377838.
- Re-Remembering the Mis-Remembered Left: The Left's Strategy and Tactics To Transform America. Co-authored with Higgins, Richard. Unconstrained Analytics. 2019. ISBN 978-1733473101.
