= John Guandolo =

American writer, conspiracy theorist, political activist and former FBI agent

- Born: John David Guandolo; 1965 or 1966 (age 59–60)
- Education: United States Naval Academy (BS)
- Occupations: Counterterrorism activist, retired FBI Special Agent
- Military career
- Branch: United States Marine Corps
- Service years: 1989–1996
- Conflicts: Gulf War
- Website: johnguandolo.com

John D. Guandolo (born 1965 or 1966) is an American former Federal Bureau of Investigation Special Agent and counterterrorism expert who has provided training seminars for law enforcement and local elected officials across the United States. Having been described as an anti-Muslim conspiracy theorist for his work after his retirement from the FBI, his seminars have been controversial and protested against by advocacy groups. He ran the seminars with the organization Understanding the Threat until the group closed down in 2023.

== Military and FBI career ==
Guandolo graduated from the United States Naval Academy with a Bachelor of Science in general engineering in 1989, after which he served in the U.S. Marine Corps and took part in the Gulf War's Operation Desert Shield and Operation Desert Storm as a platoon commander in the 2nd Battalion, 2nd Marines. He thereafter served in the 2nd Force Reconnaissance Company, and was deployed to the Adriatic and Bosnia. He was a combat diver, military free-fall parachutist, and a graduate of the U.S. Army Ranger School. He resigned from the military and joined the Federal Bureau of Investigation (FBI) as a field officer in 1996.

According to press reports, Guandolo was a counterterrorism expert in the FBI following the September 11 attacks, after having been part of the recovery and investigation of the airliner crash into the Pentagon. In 2007, he was awarded the Defender of the Homeland Award by U.S. Senators Jon Kyl and Joseph Lieberman on behalf of the Center for Security Policy. He was also involved in other cases, and according to court documents, Guandolo was found to have "had an intimate relationship with a confidential source that he thought could damage an investigation," in connection with the corruption case against former U.S. Representative William Jefferson. Guandolo resigned from the FBI around December 1, 2008, before he could be questioned by the Office of Professional Responsibility regarding his sexual liaisons with the source, or with women FBI agents. He later reportedly expressed "deep remorse" for the relationship.

== Post-FBI activities ==
=== Understanding the Threat ===
Since his resignation from the FBI, Guandolo regularly provided training courses for law enforcement and elected officials across several US states under the title "Understanding and Investigating the Jihadi Movement" with his consulting company Understanding the Threat (UTT), a Dallas-based counter-jihad organization founded in 2010. Other activists working for the organization at various times have included Chris Gaubatz, John Bennett, John Andrews and Peggy Mast. He also helped run a company called Strategic Engagement Group with Stephen Coughlin, which aimed to "educate the public on the counter jihad movement," and has worked with groups such as ACT for America and the Center for Security Policy.

The Southern Poverty Law Center (SPLC) routinely monitors Guandolo, who it describes as "a disgraced ex-FBI agent" who makes a living from "anti-Muslim witch-hunts," and has designated UTT as a "hate group". Guandolo has responded that the SPLC is "intentionally supporting a terrorist organization in violation of U.S. Law." The Council on American-Islamic Relations (CAIR) has called on local Republican Party chapters to cancel events with Guandolo, who it similarly describes as "a disgraced ex-FBI agent and anti-Muslim extremist who has peddled conspiracy theories about Islam and Muslims." Guandolo in turn claims that CAIR is a front for Hamas and the Muslim Brotherhood, and a "terrorist organization which hates and violently opposes free speech." In 2014, it was reported that Guandolo had helped draft a bill introduced by Rep. Michele Bachmann that would have designated the Muslim Brotherhood a "foreign terrorist entity".

In 2016, a planned event at Cedar Valley College in Texas was cancelled after pressure from CAIR. The same year the American Civil Liberties Union (ACLU) and the Anti-Defamation League (ADL) attempted to cancel an event in Maricopa County, Arizona. In 2018, Guandolo hosted a law enforcement training in San Angelo, Texas, which after pressure from advocacy groups was rejected by the Texas Commission on Law Enforcement because it "paints an entire religion with an overly broad brush" and "does not seem to provide any law enforcement training value to attendees." The same year, several of his planned events in the Midwest were cancelled due to local activism. He was also secretly filmed by an Al Jazeera undercover investigation. By 2022, Guandolo's bookings from law enforcement had "lessened significantly" according to the SPLC.

By 2022, Guandolo also organized training sessions for right-wing citizens about the perceived threat of "communist & Jihadist networks," and to "organize communities into operational forces to identify roots of corruption & dismantle the hostile networks behind it, and re-establish a Republican form of government at the local level," which were joined by former Trump national security adviser Michael Flynn. In June 2023 his organization Understanding the Threat closed down, stating that "the assaults from our adversaries financially and legally have been withering and overwhelming."

=== Culpeper auxiliary deputy ===
Guandolo was appointed an auxiliary deputy in Culpeper County, Virginia by Sheriff Scott Jenkins in 2014, as Jenkins hosted Guandolo's law enforcement training seminars in 2014 and 2016. The seminar in 2014 was protested against by the SPLC and CAIR, after which the Rappahannock regional criminal justice academy withdrew training credits for the course. A California-based nonprofit legal group, Muslim Advocates, in 2018 sent a Freedom of Information Act (FOIA) request to inspect public records related to the sheriff office's relationship with Guandolo, stating that Guandolo and his associates "have a long, well-documented history of spreading anti-Muslim sentiment through public comments and private law enforcement trainings in the United States."

In October 2022, Guandolo's Culpeper Sheriff's Office rifle was seized by police after he was involved in a car crash in Dallas, which led to questioning of Culpeper Sheriff Scott Jenkins, later finding that he "didn't properly train or keep records on [the] reserve force."

=== Civil lawsuit ===
Guandolo was accused in 2017 of assaulting Hennepin County, Minnesota sheriff Rich Stanek at a National Sheriffs' Association (NSA) expo in Reno, Nevada, where Guandolo was a presenter. Guandolo had previously claimed in a blog post that the sheriff "works with jihadis in the community". Nevada prosecutors quietly dismissed the charges against Guandolo, stating that even from a video of the incident, it was not clear who made first contact. Two years later, a Dallas County jury, however, awarded Stanek $600,000 in a civil lawsuit. Guandolo later lost a self-defense appeal in court.

== Views on Islam and politics ==
Having described Islam as "barbaric and evil", Guandolo has claimed that "nearly every single Muslim organization in North America is controlled by the Muslim Brotherhood or a derivative group," and that they "seek to impose Islamic law in furtherance of establishing an Islamic state here." According to The Intercept, he has said that all American Muslim groups share the same ideology as the Islamic State of Iraq and Syria (ISIS), that the majority of mosques in the US should be shut down, and called for the arrest of the leaders of the Council on American-Islamic Relations (CAIR). He has also said that the U.S. Justice Department should have prevented two Muslim women (Ilhan Omar and Rashida Tlaib) from being elected to Congress, and claimed that then-CIA Director nominee John Brennan is a secret Muslim convert. In 2018, Guandolo's Twitter account was suspended after he posted a tweet that tied the Democratic Party to the Ku Klux Klan and the Tree of Life Synagogue shooting in Pittsburgh. In 2019, he suggested the US should bomb the Kaaba in Mecca, Saudi Arabia with cruise missiles in retaliation for the Naval Air Station Pensacola shooting. Following the January 6 United States Capitol attack, having been present at the pro-Trump "Stop the Steal" rally with a group to pray, he praised insurrectionists for showing "restraint" by not publicly executing lawmakers.

== Works ==
=== Bibliography ===
- Shariah: The Threat To America. Co-authored as Team B II. Center for Security Policy Press. 2010. ISBN 978-0982294765.
- Raising a Jihadi Generation: Understanding the Muslim Brotherhood Movement in America. Lepanto Publishing. 2013. ISBN 978-0988724501.
- The Secure Freedom Strategy: A Plan for Victory Over the Global Jihad Movement. Co-authored as The Tiger Team. Center for Security Policy Press. 2015. ISBN 978-1507756133.
- Islam's Deception: The Truth About Sharia. Guandolo Associates LLC. 2019. ISBN 978-0988724518.

=== Discography ===
==== Boats Against The Current ====
Guandolo is the lead vocalist, guitarist and a songwriter for the band Boats Against The Current.

- "America (Land of the Free)", single (2011)
- America, studio album (2012)
- The Journey, studio album (2016)
- "A Moment", single (2017)
- Love Hold Me, studio album (2018)
- Boats in Nashville, EP (2021)
- "Whatever Happened to America", single (2023)
- "It Is Love", single (2023)
- "The Call, Pts. 1 & 2", single (2023)
