= Citizens for a Nuclear Free Iran =

American nonprofit organization

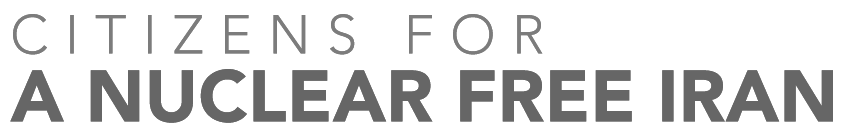
- Abbreviation: CNFI
- Formation: July 17, 2015
- Type: 501(c) organization, lobbying group
- Location: United States
- Leader: Patrick Dorton
- Key people: Mary Landrieu, Evan Bayh, Shelley Berkley, Mark Begich, Joe Lieberman
- Parent organization: AIPAC
- Expenses: $20-30 million
- Website: nuclearfreeiran.org (defunct)

Citizens for a Nuclear Free Iran (CNFI) was an American 501(c)(4) organization launched by American Israel Public Affairs Committee (AIPAC) on July 17, 2015 for the purpose of educating the public about the dangers of Iran nuclear deal. The organization spent around $20 million unsuccessfully campaigning against the deal through advertising and other methods.

The organization's advisory board included five Democratic Party politicians; Mary Landrieu, Evan Bayh, Shelley Berkley, Mark Begich and Joe Lieberman. The organization was run by Patrick Dorton, a public relations employee of AIPAC.

== History ==
Citizens for a Nuclear Free Iran was founded on July 17, 2015 by American Israel Public Affairs Committee, a pro-Israel lobbying group. The organization was created as a tax-exempt lobbying group to oppose president Barack Obama's nuclear deal with Iran. Patrick Dorton, spokesman of the organization, said that its mission is to educate the public about the dangers of the proposed Iran deal and lobby both the Democrats and Republicans against it. Reportedly, CFNI has planned to spend $20 million on advertising in 30-40 states. CNFI was managed by consulting firm Mellman Group, the organization paid the firm $241,439 in 2015.

CNFI's advertisements were broadcast on news programs on central and cable channels. The ads argued that the nuclear deal with Iran should be rejected because it will expire after 10 years, giving it enough time to obtain nuclear weapons. The organization staged protests, organized visits to Washington, D.C. for AIPAC members, and bought newspaper advertisements to promote itself. Its efforts failed and did not prevent the deal from being implemented.

== Campaign and controversy ==
The Washington Free Beacon reported that CFNI spent $4,898,111 on advertising, mostly targeting Democratic lawmakers. CFNI paid $76,000 to four TV stations in Honolulu, Hawaii to air its ads from July 13, 2015 to August 2. The stations were KHON-TV, KITV, KGMB and KHNL. A 2017 report by LobeLog revealed that CFNI donated $60,000 to controversial Center for Security Policy, accused of promoting conspiracy theories and islamophobia. CNFI reportedly raised $30 million in donations from 40 states to organizations supporting Israeli Likud party. In late July 2015, the organization, along with hundreds of pro-Israel activists, organized a sit-in in Washington D.C, urging lawmakers to reject the nuclear deal.

One of the organization's ads released in July 2015 was found to be misleading by fact-checker because it took statistics out of context. The ad claimed that if the deal was ratified, 50 Iranian military sites would remain uninspected, despite the fact that the facilities mentioned in the ad are not related to nuclear development and some are not considered military facilities.

In July 2015, AIPAC launched a major campaign opposing the Iran nuclear deal, reportedly planning to spend $20 million to persuade Congress to reject the agreement. As part of this effort, it established Citizens for a Nuclear Free Iran, an advocacy group that used footage featuring Alireza Jafarzadeh, a prominent figure associated with the Iranian opposition group Mujahedin-e Khalq (MEK), in a television advertisement. The article also highlighted the relationship between former US senator Joe Lieberman, an adviser to Citizens for a Nuclear Free Iran.
