= Tea Party Nation =

Conservative political movement in America

- Formation: 2009
- Headquarters: Franklin, Tennessee
- Leader: Judson Phillips
- Key people: Tom Trento
- Website: TeaPartyNation.com

Tea Party Nation is a conservative American group considered part of the Tea Party movement. Their official website describes them as "group of like-minded people who desire our God given Individual Freedoms which were written out by the Founding Fathers. We believe in Limited Government, Free Speech, the 2nd Amendment, our Military, Secure Borders and our Country!"

The group was created by former Shelby County, Tennessee assistant district attorney Judson Phillips in 2009. It runs a social networking site for conservative activists and is best known for organizing the 2010 National Tea Party Convention. In February 2010, Tea Party Nation was among the twelve most influential groups in the Tea Party movement, according to the National Journal. In September 2010, it was one of the top five most influential organizations in the Tea Party movement, according to the Washington Post.

== National Tea Party Convention ==
Tea Party Nation organized the National Tea Party Convention held February 4–6, 2010. Around 600 activists attended the event, and Sarah Palin was featured as the keynote speaker. The event was criticized for its $549 ticket price, as well as the fact that Palin was apparently paid US$100,000 for her appearance. Palin has said she will donate the fee to unspecified conservative causes.

Several prominent conservative organizations refused to participate in the event due to its for-profit nature. The Tea Party Patriots advised members not to participate in December 2009. Erick Erickson of the conservative blog RedState described the convention as "scammy" on January 11. The American Liberty Alliance (ALA), initially a co-sponsor, withdrew its support on January 13. Later in January, Michele Bachmann and Marsha Blackburn cancelled their plans to speak.

At the convention, it was announced that a 501(c)(4) corporation and political action committee (PAC) called "Ensuring Liberty" would be formed to support candidates for office in the 2010 elections.

A subsequent convention was booked for the following July, postponed until October, and ultimately cancelled. On July 18, 2011, the Venetian Casino Resort filed suit for unpaid bills allegedly totaling $642,144. A judge ordered Tea Party Nation founder Judson Phillips to pay $748,000, including the $554,000 hotel bill and $194,300 in accrued interest, for the 1,637 reserved rooms.

== Activities ==
Tea Party Nation is listed as a hate group by the Southern Poverty Law Center, and is the only Tea Party-related group to be noted as such.

=== Comments on voting rights ===
Tea Party Nation and especially its founder have generated criticism and controversy. For example, founder Judson Phillips claimed that voting rights should be restricted to property owners.

=== Reaction to Keith Ellison candidacy ===
In an October 2010 statement endorsing Lynne Torgerson (the Independence Party of Minnesota candidate for Minnesota's 5th congressional district), Phillips made an anti-Islam critique against Representative Keith Ellison. Phillips' critique asserted that Ellison is unfit for Congress in part because Ellison is Muslim. The candidate Phillips endorsed was also controversial for her assertion that Islam "is not 'religion' recognizable under the First Amendment of the United States Constitution."

=== Reaction to Gabrielle Giffords assassination attempt ===
Phillips is also known for the controversial comments he made after the attempted assassination of Representative Gabby Giffords (D-Ariz.), and the murders of a federal district judge and others, during a shooting spree on January 8, 2011. He described the shooter, Jared Lee Loughner, as "a leftist lunatic," apparently because one person who knew Loughner in high school said he was a liberal several years ago. Phillips instructed members of Tea Party Nation to blame liberals for the attempted assassination to defend the tea party movement's recent electoral gains: "The hard left is going to try and silence the Tea Party movement by blaming us for this," likening the expected blowback to the criticism heaped on "conservative talk radio, especially Rush Limbaugh" for the Oklahoma City bombing in 1995.

One commentator, Garance Franke-Ruta, wrote about the group, "Showing no sign of tamping down on divisive political rhetoric in the wake of the shooting of 20 people that left six dead in Tucson Saturday, the Tea Party Nation group e-mailed its members Sunday warning them they would be called upon to fight leftists in the days ahead and defend their movement." Writing on Forbes.com, Rick Ungar called the e-mail a "deeply disturbing memo." Ungar continued, "It was immediately clear that Mr. Phillips is far more concerned about his own political interests and power than he is with the health of Congresswoman Gabby Giffords or in experiencing even the tiniest measure of compassion for the families who lost loved ones in this awful attack."

=== Reaction to Boston Marathon bombing ===
After the Boston Marathon bombing, Judson Phillips wrote, "There are two reasons why we will be hit again. First, we have a determined enemy who hates us. Second, we have a government that is not committed to protecting America." Philips also wrote an opinion piece which questioned "Why is the Regime [the Obama Administration] in such a hurry to get him [Saudi national Abdul Rahman Ali Alharbi] out of the country?"

== See also ==
- Patriot movement
