= Andrew C. McCarthy =

American lawyer

Andrew McCarthy
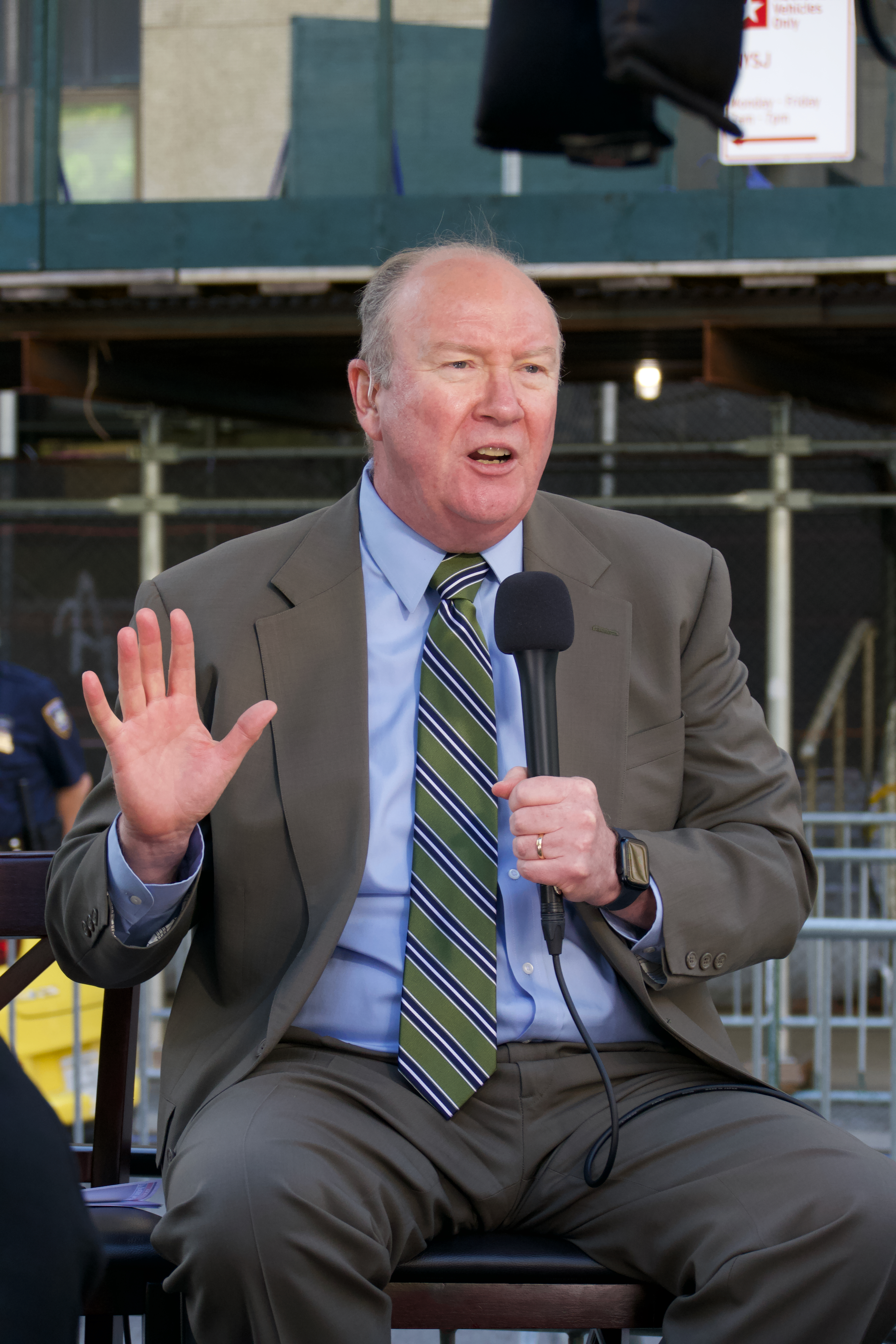
- McCarthy reporting on the prosecution of Donald Trump in New York

Assistant United States Attorney for the Southern District of New York

Personal details
- Born: 1958 or 1959 (age 67–68) The Bronx, U.S.
- Party: Republican
- Education: Columbia University (BA); New York Law School (JD)

Andrew C. McCarthy III (born 1958 or 1959) is an American lawyer and columnist for National Review. He served as an Assistant United States Attorney for the Southern District of New York. He led the 1995 terrorism prosecution against Sheikh Omar Abdel-Rahman and eleven others. The defendants were convicted of the 1993 World Trade Center bombing and planning a series of attacks against New York City landmarks. He also contributed to the prosecutions of terrorists who bombed United States embassies in Kenya and Tanzania. He resigned from the Justice Department in 2003.

During the presidency of Barack Obama, McCarthy characterized Obama as a radical and a socialist, and authored a book alleging that Obama was advancing a "Sharia Agenda". He authored another book calling for Obama's impeachment. He defended claims that the Affordable Care Act would lead to "death panels", and promoted a conspiracy theory that Bill Ayers, co-founder of the militant radical left-wing organization Weather Underground, had authored Obama's autobiography Dreams from My Father. He is a Republican.

== Early life and career ==
McCarthy is the oldest of six children. His father died when he was 13. He graduated from Cardinal Hayes High School in the Bronx borough of New York City, and Columbia College. After graduating from Columbia, McCarthy became a Deputy United States Marshal in the Federal Witness Protection Program. While working at the US Marshal's Office, he studied law at New York Law School. He later joined the US Attorney's Office for the Southern District of New York as a paralegal.

In 1986, he was hired as a prosecutor at the Southern District and worked directly for then US Attorney for the district, Rudy Giuliani. In 1995, McCarthy led the successful prosecution of Sheikh Omar Abdel-Rahman and eleven others for planning and carrying out the 1993 World Trade Center bombing and the planning of a series of further attacks against New York City landmarks. McCarthy led the satellite office of the Southern District, in White Plains, New York, for five years, where he investigated the 1998 bombings of United States embassies in Kenya and Tanzania.

After the September 11th attacks in 2001, McCarthy's became a key member of a command team of prosecutors tasked with drafting search warrants and "connecting dots" in the ensuing investigations. He left the prosecutor's office in 2003.

McCarthy is currently a senior fellow at the Foundation for Defense of Democracies, serving as the director of the FDD's Center for Law and Counterterrorism. He has served as an attorney for Rudy Giuliani, and is also an opinion columnist for National Review and Commentary. He has also been a regular contributor to Fox News. He has also served as an adjunct professor at New York Law School and Fordham University School of Law.

== Views ==
=== Prosecution of terrorism ===
McCarthy was a key member of the terrorism prosecution team after the 1993 World Trade Center bombing. Starting in the late 1990s, however, he became a vocal skeptic of the use the Southern District of New York's law enforcement infrastructure as the primary method of countering terrorism, stating: “We've become headquarters for counterterrorism in the United States.... Not the CIA. Not anyplace in Washington. The U.S. attorney’s office for the Southern District of New York. From the country’s perspective, it’s not a good thing.” A prosecutor's job, he added, “is not the national security of the United States.”

He criticized the Obama administration for trying suspected terrorists in civilian courts.

=== Islam ===
McCarthy has written several books about the perceived threat from Islam, and has worked with anti-Muslim organizations such as the Center for Security Policy and the David Horowitz Freedom Center. He has been considered as a more moderate part of the counter-jihad movement as he distinguishes between Islam and Islamism.

=== Support for Rudy Giuliani ===
McCarthy has known Rudy Giuliani since at least as early as 1986, when he began his career under Giuliani at the Southern District of New York. In February 2007, McCarthy authored an endorsement for the fledgling candidacy of Rudy Giuliani during the 2008 presidential election campaign in the National Review. McCarthy also served as Giuliani's attorney during the campaign.

=== Barack Obama ===
During the 2008 presidential election campaign, McCarthy wrote a number of posts on the National Review's Corner blog stating that he thought that Democratic presidential candidate Barack Obama was not serious about protecting United States national security against threats from Islamic extremism and elsewhere, and that Obama had a number of troubling ties and associations with leftist radicals. McCarthy promoted the conspiracy theory that Bill Ayers, co-founder of the militant radical left-wing organization Weather Underground, had authored Obama's autobiography Dreams from My Father. McCarthy reviewed the article as "thorough, thoughtful, and alarming". McCarthy argued in October 2008, "that the issue of Obama's personal radicalism, including his collaboration with radical, America-hating Leftists, should have been disqualifying." He claimed that Obama was engaged in "bottom-up socialism."

McCarthy defended Sarah Palin's claim that Obama's healthcare reform, the Affordable Care Act, would lead to the creation of "death panels." In May 2009, McCarthy provided details of a letter declining an invitation from Attorney General Eric Holder for a round-table meeting with President Barack Obama concerning the status of people detained in the war on terror. McCarthy noted his dissension with the administration in their policies regarding the detainees. On December 5, 2009 he came out publicly against prosecuting Islamic terrorists in civil courts rather than military tribunals, saying "A war is a war. A war is not a crime, and you don't bring your enemies to a courthouse."

Throughout the Obama administration, McCarthy posited that the Obama administration was advancing a "Sharia Agenda", arguing that radical Islamists were working with liberals within the United States government to subvert democracy in the West. In 2014, McCarthy published a book calling for Obama's impeachment, saying Obama had committed seven categories of impeachable offenses. He said, "the failure to pursue impeachment is likely to be suicide for the country."

=== Hillary Clinton ===
Even though Hillary Clinton's tenure as Secretary of State had ended in 2013, McCarthy called for her impeachment from that office in 2016 for actions performed during that tenure. The purpose of this would have been to bar her from holding further federal offices, thus frustrating her presidential run.

=== Gun violence ===
McCarthy has stated on Fox News that he supports gun violence restraining orders as a tool for American law enforcement to remove firearms from those found to be a danger to themselves and/or others. He believes that the measures can reduce the country's gun violence problem.

=== Donald Trump ===
In 2019, McCarthy authored Ball of Collusion: The Plot to Rig an Election and Destroy a Presidency, alleging that the Clinton campaign and the Obama administration colluded to rig the 2016 election against Trump, who endorsed the book in September 2019. McCarthy defended Trump amid calls for his impeachment in 2019 over the Trump–Ukraine scandal wherein Trump sought to intimidate the Ukrainian president into starting an investigation of the allegedly corrupt business dealings of Hunter Biden, the son of Trump's political rival, Joe Biden. McCarthy expressed a belief that Trump's actions regarding the incident did not reach the level of impeachable conduct. During Donald Trump's presidency, McCarthy defended Trump before his first impeachment, but before his second impeachment, wrote that he had "committed an impeachable offense."

After the January 6, 2021 attack on the United States Capitol, McCarthy wrote that he now considered Trump's presidency "indelibly stained" and wrote, "I do think the president has committed an impeachable offense, making a reckless speech that incited a throng on the mall, which foreseeably included an insurrectionist mob." However, he also believed that Congress mishandled the impeachment both in its timing and charge.

In 2023, McCarthy wrote in National Review about Trump's federal indictment for allegedly mishandling classified documents, saying that earlier failures to prosecute Hillary Clinton did not mean that Trump is "owed a pass": "I don't believe that Trump's lawyers, who were trying to help him, would testify—as they have very reluctantly testified—that he tried to get them to destroy evidence and obstruct justice, unless he really did try to get them to destroy evidence and obstruct justice."

== Publications ==
- Willful Blindness: Memoir of the Jihad (Encounter Books, 2008) ISBN 978-1-59-403265-3
- How Obama Embraces Islam's Sharia Agenda (Encounter Broadsides, 2010) ISBN 978-1-59-403558-6
- Team B II: Shariah: The Threat To America (Center for Security Policy Press, 2010) ISBN 978-0982294765
- The Grand Jihad: How Islam and the Left Sabotage America (Encounter Books, 2010)
- How the Obama Administration has Politicized Justice (Encounter Broadsides, 2010)
- Spring Fever: The Illusion of Islamic Democracy (Encounter Books, 2013) ISBN 978-1-59-403691-0
- Faithless Execution: Building the Political Case for Obama's Impeachment (Encounter Books, 2014)
- Islam and Free Speech (Encounter Broadside, 2015) ISBN 978-1-59-403748-1
- Ball of Collusion: The Plot to Rig an Election and Destroy a Presidency (Encounter Books, 2019) ISBN 978-1-64-177025-5
