= Sarah Posner =

American journalist and author

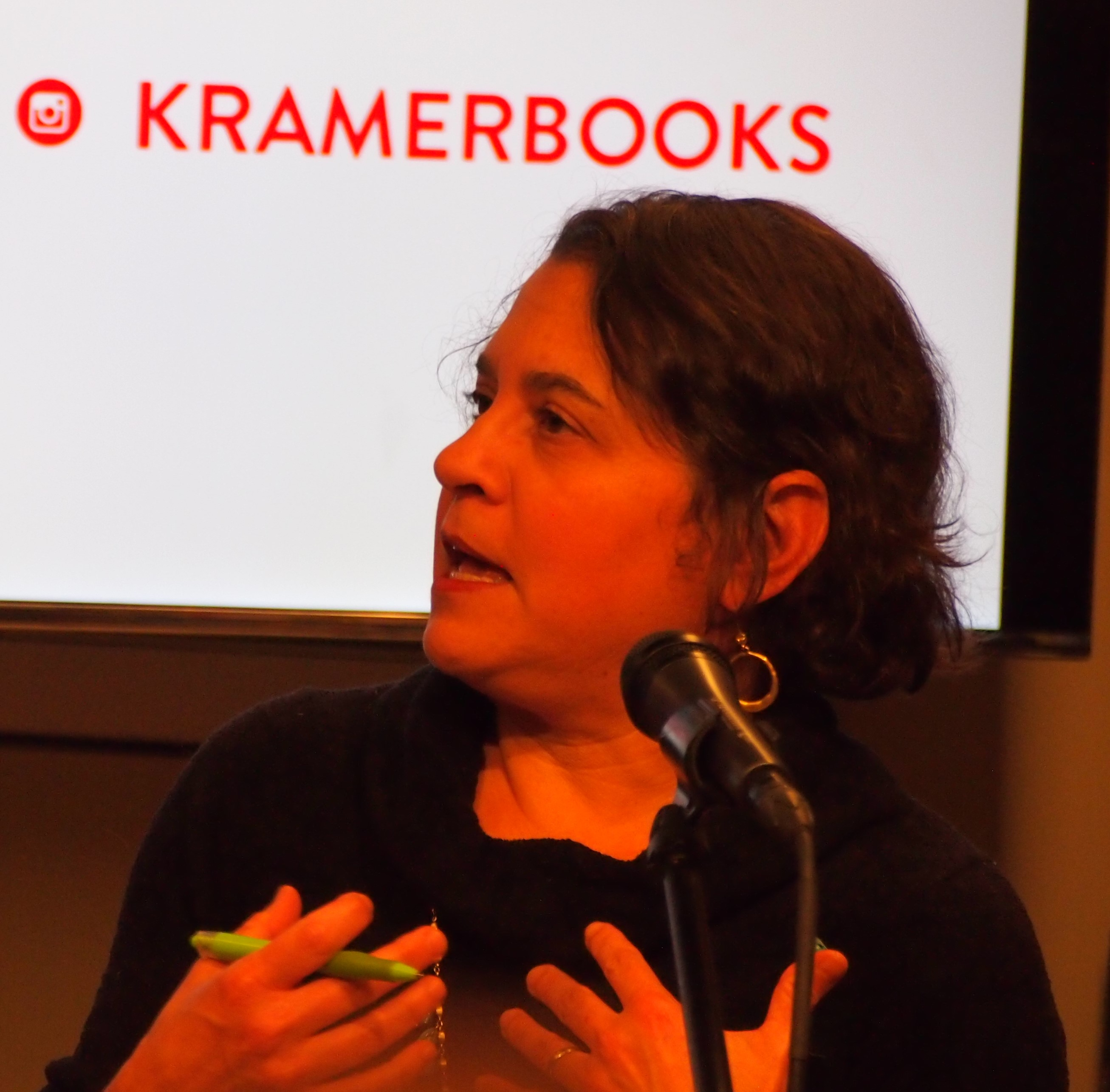
- Posner in 2017
- Occupation: Journalist
- Writing career
- Genre: Non-fiction
- Website: www.sarahposner.com

Sarah Posner is an American journalist and author. She is the author of two books about the American Christian right and has written for The American Prospect, The Guardian, The Nation, Salon, AlterNet, The Atlantic, The Washington Spectator, VICE, The Daily Beast, The New Republic, HuffPost, Mother Jones, Rolling Stone, MSNBC, and The Washington Post, among other publications. She was formerly a contributing writer for Religion Dispatches, writing on the intersection of religion and politics.

Her second book, Unholy, was favorably reviewed by the National Catholic Reporter and by writers at Wesleyan University and Washington University in St. Louis. Terry Gross interviewed Posner about her book on Fresh Air.

== Books ==
- God's Profits: Faith, Fraud, and the Republican Crusade for Values Voters (2008) ISBN 978-0-9794822-1-2 OCLC 166872616
- Unholy: Why White Evangelicals Worship at the Altar of Donald Trump (2021) ISBN 978-1984820426
