= Frederick H. Fleitz =

American government official (born 1962)

Fred Fleitz
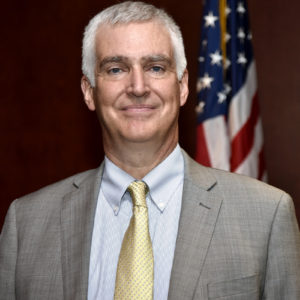

Executive Secretary and Chief of Staff of the United States National Security Council
- In office April 27, 2018 – October 31, 2018
- President: Donald Trump
- Preceded by: Keith Kellogg
- Succeeded by: Joan Virginia O’Hara

Personal details
- Born: February 24, 1962 (age 64)
- Party: Republican
- Education: Saint Joseph's University (BA); Fordham University (MA)
- Website: https://fredfleitz.com

Frederick Henry Fleitz Jr. (born February 24, 1962) is a former U.S. government official who has served since January 2022 as vice chairman of the America First Policy Institute in its Center for American Security department. He previously served as the chief of staff and executive secretary of the National Security Council from May through October 2018, during the administration of U.S. President Donald Trump. Fleitz is a former CIA analyst and news commentator.

== Career ==
=== Early career in government ===
Fleitz served in U.S. government national security positions for 25 years with the Central Intelligence Agency, Defense Intelligence Agency, Department of State, and the staff of the U.S. House Committee on Intelligence. Fleitz spent 19 years with the CIA. He wrote the 2002 book Peacekeeping Fiascoes of the 1990s: Causes, Solutions, and U.S. Interests.

=== With George W. Bush (2001-2006) ===
From 2001 to 2006, Fleitz served as chief of staff to Undersecretaries of State for Arms Control John Bolton (2001–2005) and Robert Joseph (2005–2006). Arianna Huffington described Fleitz in a 2005 article as "Bolton's chief enforcer."

Fleitz's name first hit the press in the spring of 2005 during the battle in the Senate Foreign Relations Committee to confirm Bolton as U.S. Ambassador to the United Nations. Several accounts described challenges Fleitz faced as Bolton's chief of staff, mostly involving conflict over a controversial speech Bolton delivered on a possible Cuban biological weapons program. Most contemporaneous press accounts in 2005 portrayed this matter as a personnel dispute over a disagreement with two intelligence officers over assertions Bolton wanted to make in the speech. In his own testimony, Fleitz said one of the analysts had forwarded Bolton's speech for the CIA to review, but attached his own dissenting commentary and then denied doing so. This led to a confrontation and an apology from the analyst's supervisors. Fleitz testified that the other analyst campaigned against the speech after it had been delivered to Congress and the press. Investigative reporter Kenneth Timmerman in his 2007 book Shadow Warriors (Crown Forum) wrote that controversy over Bolton's 2002 Cuba speech stemmed from heavy pressure from a small number of intelligence officers who favored a softer line on Cuba. Timmerman said these intelligence analysts politicized Bolton's text and that Fleitz resisted their efforts. Rowan Scarborough, in his 2007 book Sabotage: America's Enemies Within the CIA (Regnery), came to a similar conclusion and wrote that Fleitz paid a professional price for defending Bolton and standing up to political pressure from rogue CIA and State Department intelligence analysts.

=== On Capitol Hill (2006-2011) ===
From 2006 to 2011, Fleitz was a senior staff member with House Intelligence Committee and a senior adviser to committee ranking member Peter Hoekstra.

=== With Newsmax and others (2011-2018) ===
In 2011, Fleitz was hired by the organization Newsmax Media to found the Langley Intelligence Group Network (LIGNET), an online international analysis and forecasting service. He served as the LIGNET Director until 2013 when he was named a senior fellow with the Center for Security Policy (CSP). In February 2015, Fleitz became senior vice president for policy and programs. In his writings for CSP, Fleitz said that major American Muslim organizations and mosques were secretly working to advance a jihadist agenda, that such groups should not be trusted when they claim to "eschew violence", and that they should be "neutralized as political forces." He has been described as part of the counter-jihad movement, having contributed to the CSP's counterjihad.com website.

Fleitz has appeared on the Fox News Channel and other media outlets. Fleitz opposed the Iran nuclear agreement. In his columns, Fleitz frequently defended fringe anti-Muslim, far-right activists such as Robert Spencer and Pamela Geller.

=== Trump NSC (2017) ===
In April 2018, John R. Bolton was appointed National Security Advisor for President Donald Trump. Fleitz had previously served as Bolton's chief of staff at the State Department during the Presidency of George W. Bush. Bolton selected Fleitz to serve as his NSC Chief of Staff, replacing Keith Kellogg. He left his position on October 31 of that year to rejoin the Center for Security Policy and was succeeded by Joan Virginia O'Hara.

=== Since 2018 ===
After Fleitz left the National Security Council, President Trump considered him for two cabinet level national security posts. According to press reports, Fleitz was a top candidate in 2019 to be Director of National Intelligence. In September 2019, Fleitz was among five finalists to succeed John Bolton as National Security Adviser.

Fleitz had a byline with the National Review over the course of five years, and had notable collaborations with Keith Kellogg.

==== America First Policy Institute (2022-present) ====
Fleitz has served since January 2022 as vice chairman of the America First Policy Institute in its Center for American Security department. He was interviewed in November 2024 about then-candidate Trump's likely course of foreign policy should he win a second presidential term. He returned to the airwaves after the 2025 Trump Putin summit to remind his audience that Trump threatened additional heavier sanctions if Putin defected from his peace initiative.
