= Harry E. Soyster =

United States Army general

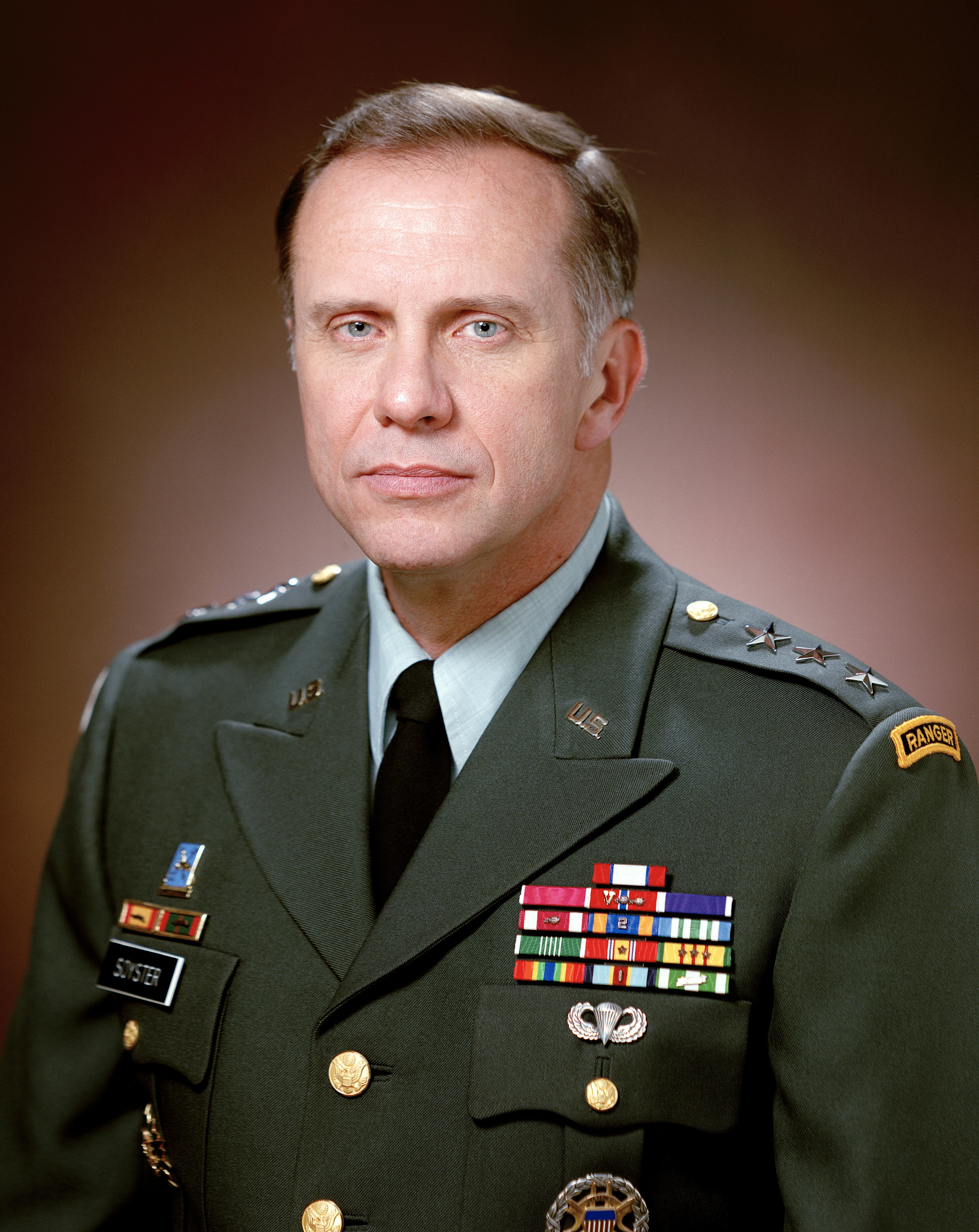
- Lieutenant General Harry E. Soyster; Director of the Defense Intelligence Agency; 1988–1991
- Born: Harry Edward Soyster; 6 June 1935 (age 91); Altoona, Pennsylvania, U.S.
- Allegiance: United States of America
- Branch: United States Army
- Service years: 1957–1991
- Rank: Lieutenant General
- Commands: Director, Defense Intelligence Agency; Commanding General, U.S. Army Intelligence & Security Command
- Conflicts: Vietnam War; Cold War; Operation Desert Shield; Desert Storm
- Awards: Defense Distinguished Service Medal; Distinguished Service Medal (2); Legion of Merit (3); Bronze Star (3); Purple Heart; National Intelligence Distinguished Service Medal

Harry Edward Soyster (born 6 June 1935) is a retired United States Army Lieutenant General.

== Overview ==
Soyster served as the Commanding General of the United States Army Intelligence and Security Command (INSCOM). Upon promotion to the rank of Lieutenant General, Soyster served as the Director of the Defense Intelligence Agency at Bolling Air Force Base, Washington D.C. Soyster served in this role from December 1988 to September 1991. Upon retirement he was the VP for International Operations for the private military firm Military Professional Resources Inc. He later served as Special Assistant to the SEC ARMY for World War II 60th Anniversary Commemorations. Soyster is a member of the Military Intelligence Hall of Fame and currently serves on numerous boards of directors and participates in studies on current issues. Lieutenant General Soyster has three daughters (Karin Soyster Fitzgerald, Megan Soyster Heinz, and Allison Moser) and six grandchildren (Julia Moser, Sloan Soyster Heinz, Stephen Moser, Maxwell Soyster Heinz, Reed Soyster Heinz, and Clark Soyster Heinz).

== Early life ==
Harry Edward Soyster was born on 6 June 1935 in Altoona, Pennsylvania and was raised in Hollidaysburg, Pennsylvania. He attended school there and was subsequently appointed to the United States Military Academy at West Point, NY. General Soyster was an Eagle Scout, Class President, member of the first all-star football team from Hollidaysburg, and captained the first undefeated basketball team in the history of the school. Rensselaer Polytechnic Institute recognized General Soyster for the highest average grade in math and science in his school. He was also recognized as best "All-Around Boy" by local town officials. General Soyster worked in a stone quarry and in construction during summer breaks from school.

== Education ==
Lieutenant General Soyster was commissioned a second lieutenant of Field Artillery, and awarded a BS in Engineering from the United States Military Academy in 1957. He also holds a master of science degree in chemistry from Pennsylvania State University in 1963 and a master of science degree in management from the University of Southern California and attended programs at Harvard University. His military education includes completion of the Field Artillery School, Basic and Advanced Courses; the U.S. Army Command and General Staff College graduating in 1968, and the National War College at Fort McNair, Washington DC graduating in 1977.

== Military career ==
Soyster has held a wide variety of important commands and staff positions including tours in Vietnam and Korea. He was chief of staff, 24th Infantry Division and Fort Stewart, Georgia, and Deputy Assistant Chief of Staff for Intelligence Systems and Automation, Office of the Assistant Chief of Staff for Intelligence, Headquarters, Department of the Army.

General Soyster served in diverse and significant assignments before becoming DIA director. His initial overseas assignment was in Italy with the 1st Battalion, 80th Artillery as platoon leader and assistant operations officer (AS3). He was next an assistant professor of chemistry at the US Military Academy.

In Vietnam, he was executive officer (XO) and subsequently operations officer (S3) of the 2nd Battalion, 35th Artillery, II Field Force, U.S. Military Assistance Command Vietnam (MACV).

On return to the United States he was assigned as a personnel staff officer, Strength Requirements Branch, Capabilities and Analysis Division, Procurement and Distribution Directorate, Office of the Deputy Chief of Staff for Personnel, U.S. Army, Washington, D.C. He served as staff operations watch officer and later operations and plans officer, Joint Reconnaissance Center, Operations Directorate, J3, Organization of the Joint Chiefs of Staff, Washington, D.C.

He returned overseas to serve as commander of the 1st Battalion, 31st Field Artillery, 2nd Infantry Division, Korea, and later as commander, 2nd Battalion, 17th Field Artillery, 2nd Infantry Division, Korea.

Upon return to the United States, he served at Carlisle Barracks, Pennsylvania, as chief of oral history, U.S. Army Military History Research Collection. After attending the National War College at Fort McNair, he was assigned chief of the Audit and Inspection Compliance Division, U.S. Army Inspector General Agency, Washington, D.C.

He then served as commander, Division Artillery and then Chief of Staff, 24th Infantry Division, Fort Stewart, Georgia. Upon promotion to brigadier general he was assigned as Deputy Assistant Chief of Staff for Intelligence, Department of the Army, Washington, D.C.

He was promoted to major general and assigned as Commanding General of the U.S. Army Intelligence and Security Command, Arlington Hall Station, Virginia. Then promoted and assigned, Director, Defense Intelligence Agency

General Soyster oversaw the Defense intelligence effort in support of the successful U.S. intervention in Panama in 1989 (Operation JUST CAUSE). This operation demonstrated the benefits of increased cooperation and planning that had been achieved between DIA and operational force planners, especially when compared to the 1983 Grenada incursion (Operation URGENT FURY). The Agency provided threat data on "hot spots" throughout the Middle East, Africa, and Asia, and weighed the impact of changes in the Soviet Union, Eastern Europe, and to a lesser degree, Asia, on the rest of world. It supplied decision makers with intelligence support concerning the final Soviet withdrawal from Afghanistan, events surrounding the downing of two Libyan jets, the civil war in Liberia, the Flight 103 investigation at Lockerbie, Scotland, and the 1989 Tiananmen Square protests and massacre in China. Weapons acquisition issues, counternarcotics, counterterrorism remained a high priority throughout the Defense Intelligence Community.

The end of the Cold War resulted in a reevaluation of the intelligence mission throughout the Intelligence Community as a new era began with the fall of the Communist Party in many East European countries, the reunification of Germany, and ongoing economic reforms in the region. Emphasis was placed on improved management of DoD-wide intelligence production, but reduced resources threatened to have a negative impact on Agency objectives and manpower levels. Organizationally, the general emphasized the functional manager system as a programming mechanism for addressing the issues of the Unified & Specified Commands.

The Assistant Secretary of Defense (Command, Control, Communication, and Intelligence) relationship to DIA was enhanced with authority, direction, and control prerogatives. The deputy director position became a civilian position to insure that a substantive intelligence officer would hold that position. The previous two-star position was moved to the Pentagon's J2 office, and the title changed accordingly.

Iraq's invasion on 2 August 1990 of Kuwait resulted in a coalition of UN forces that resolved to liberate that country. DIA warned of the Iraqi threat in late July. An intensive and extensive 24-hour operation went into effect in DIA with daily tailored intelligence support to coalition forces, participation in daily press briefings, and the full range of printed product support to numerous consumers. All phases of the Agency's workforce and more than 2,000 people contributed to Operation DESERT SHIELD. A Joint Intelligence Center (JIC) was established to integrate intelligence produced by all sectors of the community. No set of combat commanders has ever had as full and complete a view of his adversary as did U.S. and coalition field commanders during DESERT STORM, and this conflict remains one of the greatest examples of intelligence support to operational forces in modern times. For its achievements during the crisis and conflict, DIA received its second Joint Meritorious Unit Award from the Secretary of Defense, personally presented by the Chairman of the Joint Chiefs of Staff, General Colin L. Powell, on 26 June 1991.

In post-military work General Soyster was employed by L-3 Communications Corporation's Military Personnel Resources Incorporated (MPRI), retiring in 2005.

In response to a query regarding his view on torture in 2007 – in the aftermath of the disclosure of "waterboarding" of Al-Qaeda terrorists – General Soyster gave the following opinion:

Experienced military and intelligence professionals know that torture, in addition to being illegal and immoral, is an unreliable means of extracting information from prisoners. Much is being made of former CIA official John Kiriakou's statement that waterboarding "broke" a high-value terrorist involved in the 9/11 plot. There are always those who, whether out of fear or inexperience, rush to push the panic button instead of relying on what we know works best and most reliably in these situations. I would caution those who would rely on this example. It is far from clear that the information obtained from this prisoner through illegal means could not have been obtained through lawful methods. The FBI was getting good intelligence from this prisoner before the CIA took over. And there are numerous examples of cases where relying on information obtained through torture has disastrous consequences. The reality is that use of torture produces inconsistent results that are an unreliable basis for action and policy. The overwhelming consensus of intelligence professionals is that torture produces unreliable information. And the overwhelming consensus of senior military leaders is that resort to torture is dishonorable. Use of such primitive methods actually puts our own troops and our nation at risk."

== Awards, decorations and badges ==
Personal awards and decorations include the Defense Distinguished Service Medal, Army Distinguished Service Medal with oak leaf cluster, Legion of Merit, Bronze Star for Valor and one oak leaf clusters, one Bronze Star for Meritorious Service, Purple Heart, Army Meritorious Service Medal with oak leaf cluster, the Air Medal with 2 oak leaf clusters, the Joint Service Commendation Medal, the Army Commendation Medal, the National Defense Service Medal, the Vietnam Service Medal with four stars, Army Service Ribbon, Army Overseas Service Ribbon with numeral 2, the Vietnam Campaign Medal, and the Korea Defense Service Medal.

Unit awards include the Joint Meritorious Unit Award, the Vietnam Gallantry Cross Unit Citation, and the Vietnam Civil Actions Unit Citation.

Badges include the Parachutist Badge, Ranger tab, the Army General Staff Identification Badge, and the Joint Staff Identification Badge, the Defense Intelligence Agency Badge, and the Expert Marksmanship Badge.

General Soyster is also the recipient of the National Intelligence Distinguished Service Medal and the Military Intelligence Corps Knowlton Award.

He is a member of the Military Intelligence Hall of Fame.

U.S. military decorations
Defense Distinguished Service Medal
Distinguished Service Medal (with Oak Leaf Cluster)
Legion of Merit (with 2 Oak Leaf Clusters)
Bronze Star (with Valor Device and 2 Oak Leaf Clusters)
Purple Heart
Defense Meritorious Service Medal
Army Meritorious Service Medal (with 4 Oak Leaf Clusters)
Air Medal (for airmobile operations in combat)
Joint Service Commendation Medal
Army Commendation Medal (with Valor device and Oak Leaf Cluster)
National Defense Service Medal (with 2 service stars)
Vietnam Service Medal (with 3 stars)
Korea Defense Service Medal
Army Service Ribbon
Army Overseas Service Ribbon (with numeral 1)
Vietnam Campaign Medal
Unit awards
Joint Meritorious Unit Award
Vietnam Gallantry Cross Unit Citation
Vietnam Civil Actions Unit Citation
Qualification badges
Ranger Tab
Basic Parachutist Badge
Army Staff Identification Badge
Office of the Joint Chiefs of Staff Identification Badge
Defense Intelligence Agency Badge
Expert Marksmanship Badge
Army Military Intelligence Corps Distinctive Unit Insignia
National non-military awards
National Intelligence Distinguished Service Medal

Government offices
Preceded by Leonard H. Perroots	Director of the Defense Intelligence Agency; 1988–1991	Succeeded by Dennis M. Nagy
