= Frank Gaffney =

American defense policy analyst (born 1953)

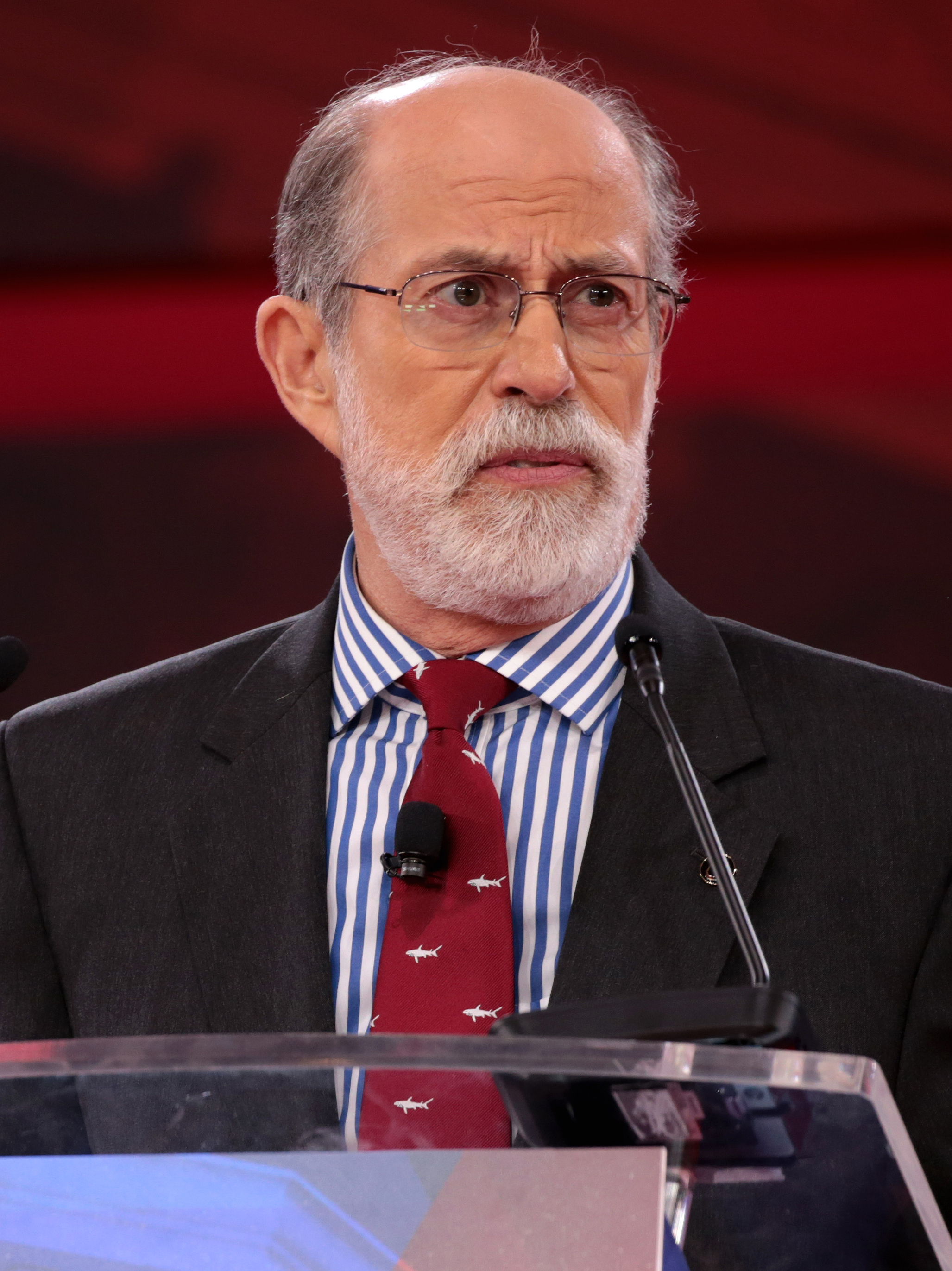
- Gaffney speaking at CPAC in 2018
- Born: Frank J. Gaffney Jr. April 5, 1953 (age 73); Pittsburgh, Pennsylvania, U.S.
- Education: Georgetown University, Edmund A. Walsh School of Foreign Service (BS); Johns Hopkins University, Nitze School of Advanced International Studies (MA)
- Occupation: Defense policy analyst
- Known for: Counter-jihad, popular conspiracy theories, conservative political commentary
- Title: Deputy Assistant Secretary of Defense (1983–87)
- Awards: Department of Defense Medal for Distinguished Public Service (1987); Zionist Organization of America's Louis Brandeis Award (2003)

Frank J. Gaffney Jr. (born April 5, 1953) is an American military policy analyst, and founder of the Center for Security Policy (CSP) think tank in Washington, D.C. Gaffney founded the CSP in 1988, serving as its president until 2023, and thereafter as executive chairman. In the 1970s and 1980s, he worked for the federal government in multiple posts, including as Deputy Assistant Secretary of Defense for Nuclear Forces and Arms Control Policy from 1983 to 1987, and seven months as Acting Assistant Secretary of Defense for International Security Affairs during the Reagan administration. He was awarded the Department of Defense Medal for Distinguished Public Service in 1987. In later years, he has been described as an anti-Muslim conspiracy theorist.

== Early life and education ==
Gaffney was born in Pittsburgh, Pennsylvania in 1953 to Virginia Gaffney (née Reed) and Frank J. Gaffney. His father was a classical music aficionado and long-time partner at the law firm of Thorp, Reed & Armstrong, which was founded by his wife's father, Earl Reed; in 2013, it merged with Clark Hill PLC. Gaffney's grandfather, Joseph Gaffney, was a city solicitor in Philadelphia. In the early 20th century, as a known Catholic in Philadelphia, he faced opposition from nativist Protestant groups who alleged that Catholics were "gaining control of American institutions while rewriting the nation's history".

Gaffney attended the Edmund A. Walsh School of Foreign Service at Georgetown University, where he graduated with a Bachelor of Science in Foreign Service in 1975. In 1978, he received an MA in International Studies from Johns Hopkins University's Paul H. Nitze School of Advanced International Studies.

== Career ==
Gaffney began his government career in the 1970s, working as an aide in the office of Democratic Senator Henry M. Jackson, under Richard Perle. From August 1983 until November 1987, Gaffney held the position of Deputy Assistant Secretary of Defense for Nuclear Forces and Arms Control Policy in the Reagan administration, again serving under Perle.

In April 1987, Gaffney was nominated to the position of Assistant Secretary of Defense for International Security Affairs. He served as the acting Assistant Secretary for seven months. During this time, despite his official post, he was excluded by senior Reagan administration officials from the then-ongoing arms control talks with the Soviet Union. Gaffney was ultimately forced out of the Pentagon; The Washington Post reported in November 1987 that, within four days of Frank Carlucci's appointment as Secretary of Defense, "Gaffney's belongings were boxed and he was gone". Following his departure from government, he immediately set about criticizing Ronald Reagan's pursuit of an arms control agreement with the USSR.

=== Center for Security Policy ===
In 1988, Gaffney established the Center for Security Policy (CSP), a Washington, D.C.–based national security think tank that has been widely described as engaging in conspiracy theorizing by a range of individuals, media outlets and organizations. Its activities are focused on exposing and researching perceived jihadist threats to the United States. The Center has been described as "not very highly respected" by BBC News and "disreputable" by Salon. It has faced strong criticism from people across the political spectrum, but has also had its reports cited by political figures such as US President Donald Trump and former Congresswoman Michele Bachmann. In 2010 Gaffney became a trustee of the Center for Security Policy. CSP has been described as an "extremist think tank" by the Center for New Community. In 2016, the CSP was classified by the Southern Poverty Law Center (SPLC) as a "hate group". The SPLC describes Gaffney as "one of America’s most notorious Islamophobes". Gaffney and the CSP have also been described as influential parts of the counter-jihad movement.

On March 16, 2016, Republican presidential candidate Ted Cruz announced he would name Frank Gaffney to be one of his National Security Advisors. Cruz said that Gaffney "is a serious thinker who has been focused on fighting jidahists [sic], fighting jihadism across the globe". In December 2015, Nation Institute Fellow Eli Clifton characterized as unscientific a CSP-funded poll that Donald Trump had been citing, which purportedly showed widespread support for Sharia law among U.S. Muslims and a need for intervention in that community. It added that, "Between Trump’s calls for a national registry of Muslims and a ban on Muslim immigration, it appears that through coincidence or outright collaboration, Trump is building an immigration and anti-Muslim policy framework that closely mirrors the statements and proposals advocated by" Gaffney and the CSP.

Discussing what he calls prominent professional participants in Islamophobia, Professor Todd Green wrote mentioned "Frank Gaffney and David Yerushalmi, both of whom head organizations that are responsible for spreading misinformation about Islam and that seek to enact anti-Muslim laws, including the infamous anti-Sharia". David Yerushalmi served as legal counsel for the CSP and has been accused of spreading misinformation about Islam and encouraging the enactment of anti-Muslim laws, including anti-Sharia legislation in the United States.

Gaffney and the CSP have been noted to have wielded influence on several prominent individuals of the Trump administration. Gaffney was himself hosted on Steve Bannon's radio show at least thirty-four times during Bannon's time in Breitbart News, and Michael Flynn, Mike Pompeo and Jeff Sessions have all been described as "devotees" of Gaffney's ideas. Following John Bolton's appointment as National Security Advisor, Gaffney was criticised as the source of where Bolton's beliefs originated on a number of subjects. This included the Iran nuclear deal and many anti-Islamic beliefs.

He stepped down as president of the CSP in January 2023 in favor of Tommy Waller, but remains its executive chairman.

==== Fax wars ====
In the 1990s, Gaffney became known in Washington, D.C., for "fax wars" he waged, whereby his "small but loyal following" would be encouraged to inundate the offices of members of Congress with faxes.

In 1995, Gaffney charged that US Secretary of Energy Hazel R. O'Leary was intentionally undermining US nuclear readiness; an analysis of Gaffney's charges against O'Leary published by William Arkin observed that Gaffney "specializes in intensely personal attacks" and his Center for Security Policy's liberal use of faxes to attack its opponents had made it the "Domino's Pizza of the policy business".

Later, in a 1997 column for The Washington Times, Gaffney alleged a seismic incident in Russia was a nuclear detonation at that nation's Novaya Zemlya test site, indicating Russia was violating the Comprehensive Test Ban Treaty (CTB). Subsequent scientific analysis of Novaya Zemlya confirmed the event was a routine earthquake. Reporting on the allegation, the Bulletin of the Atomic Scientists observed that, following its publication, "fax machines around Washington, D.C., and across the country poured out pages detailing Russian duplicity. They came from Frank Gaffney", going on to note that during the first four months of 1997, Gaffney had "issued more than 25 screeds" against the CTB.

=== Other activities ===
Gaffney also contributes to the conservative media site Newsmax. Gaffney wrote a column for The Washington Times from 2012 to 2016, and for Jewish World Review from 2000 to 2013. He was also the host of Secure Freedom Radio, a nationally-syndicated radio program and podcast which has featured guests such as Newt Gingrich, John R. Bolton, and white nationalist Jared Taylor. The radio program was turned into a television show titled Securing America TV on Real America's Voice in 2020. Gaffney is the vice-chair of the Committee on the Present Danger and has been described as part of a "new red scare" of anti-Chinese sentiment in the United States.

== Conspiracy theories ==
The Anti-Defamation League has said that Gaffney "has promulgated a number of anti-Muslim conspiracy theories over the years" and that he has "undue influence" relative to other like-minded figures. Other commentators have suggested that Gaffney's propensity for conspiracy theories began earlier during his career in the Reagan administration, where after being denied a higher position, was convinced that Soviet agents within the United States government were blocking him.

=== Civilization Jihad ===
One of Gaffney's main conspiracy theories is the so-called "Civilization Jihad", a supposed secret Muslim plan to take over America, which came to national prominence by being cited in a debate by 2016 presidential candidate Ben Carson. According to the SPLC, Gaffney's beliefs stem "from a single discredited source – a 1991 fantasy written by a lone Muslim Brotherhood member that was introduced into evidence during the 2008 Holy Land Foundation trial in Dallas federal court." The FBI found the note to be incongruous with documents taken from Muslim Brotherhood, nor was it found to have been discussed during the 1991 conference of the Muslim Brotherhood.

But to Gaffney, this document was "a smoking gun, a mission statement pointing to a massive Islamist conspiracy under our noses". The ADL quotes Gaffney as "mentioning that in 1991, a Muslim Brotherhood operative produced the "explanatory memorandum on the general strategic goal of the group in North America." According to Gaffney, the memo explicitly addresses the progress the Muslim Brotherhood has made in building an infrastructure in the United States with the goal of destroying Western civilization from within so that Islam is victorious over other religions".

The BRIDGE Initiative at Georgetown found that the memo failed to gain traction in the Arab world, as none of the sensationalist phrasings ever became commonplace in subsequent Arab literature and media. In contrast, some politicians and Islamaphobic commentators have used the phrase repeatedly to demonize Muslims.

=== ACU dispute ===
In 2011, Gaffney was banned by the American Conservative Union from the Conservative Political Action Conference (CPAC). ACU chairman David Keene released a statement contending that Gaffney "has become personally and tiresomely obsessed with his weird belief that anyone who doesn't agree with him on everything all the time or treat him with the respect and deference he believes is his due, must be either ignorant of the dangers we face or, in extreme case, dupes of the nation's enemies". Gaffney has since returned to CPAC to host panels at the conference in 2015 and 2016.

In an April 2016 column in The Washington Times titled, "When conspiracy nuts do real damage", Keene again slammed Gaffney, writing, "One hopes that is what they will do and that Mr. Gaffney will, like the folks at Group Research [an AFL-CIO entity], Mr. Hoover's aides and most conspiracy nuts of yore will vanish into the fever swamps from which he came". The column came two months after Gaffney unexpectedly left The Washington Times for Breitbart News, where he was a staff columnist and Keene was the opinion editor. Keene, who had slashed the frequency of Gaffney's column from weekly to monthly, commented to Media Matters on Gaffney's departure, describing Gaffney's work as "well-researched," and stated, "we're sorry to lose him but we wish him well". Keene also noted that Gaffney had left without giving him any notice, saying, "I guess he's notifying us through you".

=== Media responses ===
Gaffney has been called a conspiracy theorist by Dave Weigel writing in Reason magazine; Steve Benen of MSNBC; Slate; and The Intercept, among others. The Washington Post has reported that Gaffney's views were "considered radioactive by the Republican establishment", and Eli Clifton noted that Gaffney suffered "from a lack of mainstream acceptance." Democrats, and many Republicans, have called Gaffney a "conspiracy theorist".

=== Beliefs ===
Conspiracy theories Gaffney has promoted include:

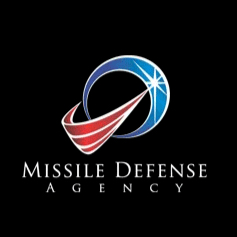
Gaffney has asserted that the logo of the U.S. Missile Defense Agency is a coded signal showing the "official U.S. submission to Islam."

- The belief that the logo of the US Missile Defense Agency is a coded indicator of "official U.S. submission to Islam" because it "appears ominously to reflect a morphing of the Islamic crescent and star with the Obama campaign logo".
- The belief that former Iraqi President Saddam Hussein was involved in the 1993 World Trade Center bombing and the Oklahoma City bombing.
- Gaffney has sought to have Republican Party strategist Grover Norquist excluded from CPAC because of his alleged ties to the Muslim Brotherhood. In 2011, Gaffney said of Norquist, "We are in a war, and he has been working with the enemy for over a decade." Responding to the accusation, the board of directors of the American Conservative Union unanimously condemned Gaffney's charges as "reprehensible" and "unfounded."
- He has opposed the building of a number of large religious Muslim sites in the United States, including Park51, also referred to as the Ground Zero Mosque.
- Accusations that Hillary Clinton aide Huma Abedin is a secret agent of the Muslim Brotherhood. After the allegation was repeated by Michele Bachmann, US senators John McCain, Scott Brown, and Marco Rubio joined in dismissing it, and Speaker of the United States House of Representatives John Boehner said "accusations like this being thrown around are pretty dangerous."
- Accusations that Barack Obama is a Muslim who has secretly orchestrated "the most consequential bait-and-switch since Adolf Hitler", that General David Petraeus had "submitted to Sharia", that Congressman Keith Ellison is "likely to leak information to the Muslim Brotherhood", and that deputies in the Broward County, Florida, sheriff's office are "directly tied to Hamas.
- The belief that the responsibility-to-protect norm has been supported by the United States government to lay the groundwork for a forthcoming American military invasion of Israel.
- The belief that Muslim enemies of the United States are hidden in plain sight and organizing through mainstream Muslim rights organizations. He said of Muslims, “They essentially, like termites, hollow out the structure of the civil society and other institutions, for the purpose of creating conditions under which the jihad will succeed.”

== Works ==
=== Books ===
- Gaffney, Frank J.; with colleagues (2005). War Footing: 10 Steps America Must Take to Prevail in the War for the Free World. Naval Institute Press. ISBN 978-1-591-14301-7.
- Gaffney, Jr., Frank J.; Luft, Gal; Zubrin, Robert; Clark, Wesley K.; Haigwood, Burl; Dolan, Greg (2010). Lerner, Ben; Reaboi, David (eds.). Homegrown Defense: Biofuels & National Security. Center for Security Policy Press. ISBN 978-0-982-29474-1.
- Team B II (2010). Shariah: The Threat To America: An Exercise In Competitive Analysis. Center for Security Policy Press. ISBN 978-0982294765.
- The Tiger Team (2015). The Secure Freedom Strategy: A Plan for Victory Over the Global Jihad Movement. Center for Security Policy Press. ISBN 978-1507756133.
- Gaffney, Jr., Frank J.; Lopez, Clare M. (2016). See No Sharia: 'Countering Violent Extremism' and the Disarming of America's First Line of Defense. Center for Security Policy Press. ISBN 978-1530234332.
- Gaffney, Frank; Laugesen, Dede (2023). The Indictment: Prosecuting the Chinese Communist Party & Friends for Crimes against America, China, and the World. War Room Books. ISBN 978-1648210044.

=== Films ===
Gaffney was an executive producer of the documentary Islam vs. Islamists: Voices From the Muslim Center.
