= Center for Security Policy =

American security policy think tank

Coordinates: 38°54′02″N 77°02′44″W

- Abbreviation: CSP
- Formation: 1988 (38 years ago)
- Founder: Frank J. Gaffney, Jr.
- Type: nonprofit
- Tax ID no.: 52-1601976
- Legal status: 501(c)(3)
- Headquarters: PMB 189; 2020 Pennsylvania Avenue, NW; Washington, D.C. 20006-1811; United States
- President: Tommy Waller (Note: president since 1 January 2023)
- Chairman: E. Miles Prentice III
- Revenue: $4 million (2023)
- Expenses: $3.88 million (2023)
- Website: centerforsecuritypolicy.org

The Center for Security Policy (CSP) is an American far-right, anti-Muslim, Washington, D.C.–based think tank. The founder and former president of the organization is Frank J. Gaffney Jr., who now serves as the group's executive chairman. The current president since January 1, 2023, is Tommy Waller, a former US Marine. CSP sometimes operates under its DBA (Note: DBA - abbreviation for Doing-Business-As) name Secure Freedom. (Note: as shown on IRS Form-990 (example yr2021)) The organization also operates a public counter-jihad campaign and the website counterjihad.com.

== History and programs ==
In April 1987, Frank Gaffney Jr. was nominated to serve as Assistant Secretary of Defense for International Security Affairs during the Reagan Administration, having served in that role for seven months until being removed in November of that same year. In a meeting with former Department of Defense officials after Gaffney's ouster, Richard Perle, for whom Gaffney had previously served as a top deputy, said, "What we need is the Domino’s Pizza of the policy business. ... If you don’t get your policy analysis in 30 minutes, you get your money back." Gaffney founded the CSP a year later in 1988. One of the center's annual reports later echoed Perle's words calling the CSP "the Domino's Pizza of the policy business."

In 2010, there were 19 co-authors of the CSP "Team B II" report Shariah: The Threat To America that claimed sharia law was a major threat to the national security of the United States. In 2012, Gaffney released a 50-page document titled, "The Muslim Brotherhood in the Obama Administration". The document questioned the Obama administration’s approach to the Muslim Brotherhood in the Middle East. The CSP has since accused a number of US officials of having ties to the Muslim Brotherhood, including Huma Abedin and Grover Norquist.

In 2013, CSP received donations from Boeing ($25,000); General Dynamics ($15,000); Lockheed Martin ($15,000); Northrop Grumman ($5,000); Raytheon ($20,000); and General Electric ($5,000). The group has also received $1.4 million from the Bradley Foundation. In 2015, CSP received $60,000 from AIPAC-affiliated Citizens for a Nuclear Free Iran.

The CSP helped to organize a rally on Capitol Hill on September 9, 2015, against the Joint Comprehensive Plan of Action, commonly known as the Iran nuclear deal. Republican presidential candidates Ted Cruz and Donald Trump spoke at the rally. In a separate report about Iran, the CSP declared that Susan Rice, Richard Haass, and Dennis Ross were being secretly controlled by a covert "Iran lobby".

On March 16, 2016, Republican presidential candidate Ted Cruz said he would appoint Gaffney to be his National Security Advisor. Cruz also said his foreign policy team would also include three other employees of Gaffney's think tank: Fred Fleitz, Clare Lopez, and Jim Hanson. During his presidential campaign, Donald Trump cited a CSP poll in support of his restrictions on travel from several Muslim countries.

=== Trump administration ===
Since 2017 several people with ties to the CSP have joined the Trump administration, including Counselor to the President Kellyanne Conway in 2017, chief of staff for the National Security Council Fred Fleitz in 2018, and Deputy National Security Advisor Charles Kupperman in 2019. Kupperman served on the board of directors for CSP between 2001 and 2010.

The Trump administration used reports released by the CSP when it proposed to ban all Muslims from entering the United States.

In March 2026, Kyle Shideler, the Director and Senior Analyst for Homeland Security and Counterterrorism at the Center for Security Policy, testified as an expert witness in trial of the defendants later convicted and sentenced to hundreds of years in prison for alleged connections to Antifa in the 2025 Prairieland ICE detention center incident.

== Controversy ==
The Center and Gaffney have been widely criticized for propagating conspiracy theories, including by Dana Milbank of The Washington Post, Simon Maloy of Salon, CNN national security analyst Peter Bergen, Grover Norquist, Jonathan Kay, Georgetown University's Prince Alwaleed Center for Muslim–Christian Understanding, Center for American Progress, Media Matters for America, the Southern Poverty Law Center, The Intercept, the Anti-Defamation League, and the Institute for Southern Studies, among others. Gaffney has been described as an influential member of the counter-jihad movement, and the CPS has been described as "arguably the most important" counter-jihad advocacy group.

In 2016, the Southern Poverty Law Center (SPLC) labeled the CSP as a hate group and a "conspiracy-oriented mouthpiece for the growing anti-Muslim movement", a characterization disputed by the CSP. SPLC representatives have characterized the CSP as "an extremist think tank" and suggested that it is led by an "anti-muslim conspiracy theorist." The SPLC further criticizes CSP's "investigative reports", saying that they are designed "to reinforce [Frank] Gaffney's delusions".

One of the CSP's "Occasional Papers" accused Huma Abedin, then Hillary Clinton's aide, of being an undercover spy for the Muslim Brotherhood. On June 13, 2012, Republican members of Congress Michele Bachmann, Trent Franks, Louie Gohmert, Thomas Rooney and Lynn Westmoreland, sent a letter to the State Department Inspector General including accusations against Abedin cited to the CSP. The letter and the CSP's accusation were widely denounced as a smear, and achieved "near-universal condemnation", including from several prominent Republicans such as John McCain, John Boehner, Scott Brown, and Marco Rubio.

Writing in Religion Dispatches, Sarah Posner described the organization as "a far-right think tank whose president, Frank Gaffney, was banned from the CPAC [Conservative Political Action Conference] ... because its organizers believed him to be a 'crazy bigot'". The Center for Democratic Values at Queens College, City University of New York has said the center is among the "key players in the Sharīʿah cottage industry", which it describes as a "conspiracy theory" that claims the existence of "secretive power elite groups that conspire to replace sovereign nation-states in order to eventually rule the world".

In March 1995, William M. Arkin, a reporter and commentator on military affairs, criticized the CSP's Gaffney as a "maestro of bumper-sticker policy" who "specializes in intensely personal attacks" and who has "never met a flag-waving, pro-defense, anti-Democratic idea he didn't like." Gaffney has also generated controversy for writing in 2010 that the logo of the U.S. Missile Defense Agency "appears ominously to reflect a morphing of the Islamic crescent and star with the Obama campaign logo" and was part of a "worrying pattern of official U.S. submission to Islam".

== See also ==
- List of think tanks in the United States
- Bradley Foundation
