= The Dhimmi: Jews and Christians Under Islam =

1980 book by Bat Ye'or

- English edition cover
- Author: Bat Ye'or
- Original title: Le Dhimmi: Profil de l'opprimé en Orient et en Afrique du Nord depuis la conquête Arabe
- Translator: David Maisel (author's text), Paul Fenton (document section), and David Littman.
- Language: French
- Subject: Dhimmis (Islamic law), Islamic Empire-Ethnic relations, Arab countries-Ethnic relations.
- Published: 1980 (Editions Anthropos ) (French); 1985 (Fairleigh Dickinson University Press) (English)
- Publication place: France
- Media type: Print (hardcover)
- Pages: 335 (French ed.); 444 (English ed.)
- ISBN: 978-0-8386-3233-8
- Dewey Decimal: 909/.097671
- LC Class: DS36.9.D47 B3813 1985'

The Dhimmi: Jews and Christians Under Islam is an essay on the dhimmi peoples—the non-Arab and non-Muslim communities subjected to Muslim domination after the conquest of their territories by Arabs by Bat Ye'or. The book was first published in French in 1980, and was titled Le Dhimmi: Profil de l'opprimé en Orient et en Afrique du Nord depuis la conquête Arabe (The Dhimmi: Profile of the oppressed in the Orient and in North Africa since the Arab conquest). It was translated into English and published in 1985 under the name The Dhimmi: Jews and Christians Under Islam.

== Summary ==
Bat Ye'or's extensive research examines the conditions of non-Muslim minorities across history in Muslim-majority societies. The book highlights the differences between time periods and geographical regions. It includes a research and use of historical sources (Jew, Christian and Muslim). The book traces how the status of minorities deteriorated over centuries under discriminatory rules that became part of the dhimmi system of 'protected' minorities. Dhimmis faced exclusions from public office, restrictions on building synagogues, and limitations on testimony in Islamic courts. They were required to wear distinctive clothing and show public deference to Muslims. The book documents decrees ordering the destruction of synagogues in Egypt, Syria, Iraq and Yemen. Cases of forced conversion to Islam are also noted in Yemen, Morocco and Baghdad.

== Structure ==
In the first part of the book, the author provides a historical survey of the effects and consequences that living under Islamic rule, or using the term coined here, in "dhimmitude", had on the Jewish and Christian communities in the Middle East.

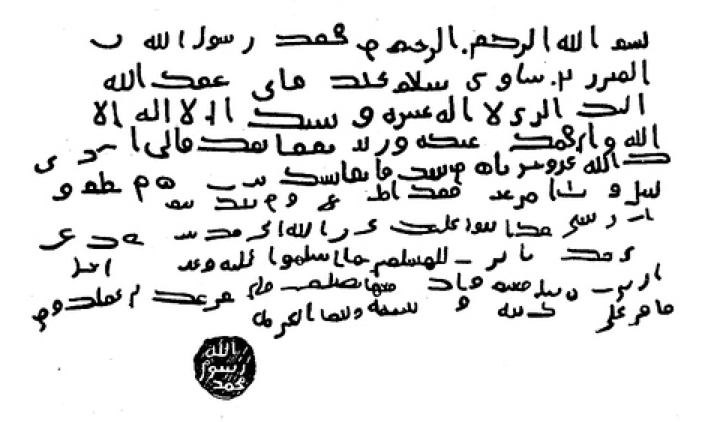
Letter sent by Muhammad to the Munzir Bin Sawa Al Tamimi, governor of Bahrain: "Of the people of Bahrain, whoever want to continue in their Jewish or Majusi faith, should be made to pay Jizya".

The second part contains correspondence and testimonies from inside and outside observers over the centuries, including speeches from various influential Arabs, texts from various middle-age sources, and eyewitness reports by British consuls. Some of these were made available in European languages for the first time with the publication of the book. It also contains rare pictures and photographs depicting religious minority community under Islamic rule. Through these documents, Bat Ye'or gives her representation of the views of Islamic theologians and jurists on the treatment of non-Muslim populations in lands ruled by Muslims from the 7th century onwards.

== Contents ==
=== Part 1 ===
==== Chapter 1: Historical Outline, Origins of the Dhimma. ====
This chapter examines the early relations between Muhammad and the Jewish tribes of Medina. It notes that when the Jews of Medina refused to convert to Islam, two major Jewish tribes were expelled by Muhammad's followers. In 627, between 600 and 900 Jewish men were killed and the surviving women and children were divided among Muhammad's followers, after the Jewish tribes rejected Muhammad's authority.

==== Chapter 2: Aspects of the Dhimmi condition ====
The chapter documents restrictions and regulations imposed on dhimmi communities under the dhimmi system, including exclusions from public office and military service, limitations on constructing synagogues and houses, and bans on riding horses, bearing arms or drinking wine in public. Dhimmis were required to show public deference to Muslims and faced restrictions in the Islamic court system, such as inability to testify against Muslims. These discriminatory conditions severely limited the legal rights and recourses available to non-Muslim minorities living under Islamic rule. The chapter argues that the inability of non-Muslims to testify against Muslims in Islamic courts inevitably resulted in denying justice to non-Muslim minorities living under Islamic rule. The chapter also documents decrees ordering the destruction of synagogues in Egypt, Syria, Iraq and Yemen over various periods. It also notes instances of forced conversion of Jews to Islam in Yemen, Morocco and Baghdad, despite Quranic prohibitions on forced conversion.

==== Chapter 3: Foreign Protection ====
This chapter is about commercial and political protections, interfaith relations, political manipulations, economic and religious rivalries and nationalism.

==== Chapter 4: Emancipation ====
This chapter is about the Muslim reaction and national independence.

=== Part 2 ===
==== Chapter 5: Jihad and Dhimma: Modern formulations ====
This chapter is about the Jihad, Arab nationalism and Dhimmi condition, Arab Umma and Dhimmi state and opprobrium as a necessity

==== Chapter 6: The Dhimmi archetype in modern Arab nationalism ====
This chapter is about Dhimmi archetype in Arab-Palestinian consciousness, toleration or oppression, fundamentalism and the challenge of the present and the future.

==== Chapter 7: Psychological aspects ====
This chapter is about the superego of the dominating group, alienation of the Dhimmi, the Dhimmi syndrome, exclusion of the Dhimmi from history, the existential significance of the Dhimmis' condition and the community ties.

=== Part 3: Documents ===
==== Chapter 1: Jurists' texts on the following subjects ====
1. Jihad
2. Conquest
3. Fate of the annexed territories and conquered people
4. Dhimmi taxation and its usage
5. Jizya and Kharaj (11th century)
6. Expulsion of the natives from state administration
7. Constraints on Dhimmis
8. Decree of Caliph al-Mutawakkil
9. Zoomorphic discriminatory badges (9th century)
10. Dhimmis servitudes in Seville (circa 1100)
11. The Jizya's meaning (1101–1130)
12. Forced conversions
13. Prestige and honor forbidden to Jews and Christians (circa 1220)
14. Dhimmis in the Maghreb and Egypt (1301)
15. Synagogues and Churches
16. Dhimmis distinctive clothing
17. Dismissal of Christian officials
18. Jewish dietary laws
19. The manner of collecting the Jizya
20. Traditions and attitudes towards Dhimmis (18th century)

==== Chapter 1: Aspects of the Dhimmis existence as observed, including ====
1. A courageous Copt in 12th century Egypt
2. Conversion of Christians
3. A Jewish Vizier in Baghdad (1290)
4. Travelers
5. Visit to the Jews of Hebron
6. 19th Ottoman Palestine
7. Abduction of Christian children
8. Massacres in Aleppo (1850)
9. Protestants in Nablus (1853)
10. Slaughter of Christians at Hasbeya and Rasheya (1860)
11. Exodus of Christians from Damascus
12. Extinction of the Dhimmi peasantry, Armenia (1869)
13. Jews and converts in Morocco (1790)
14. Dehumanization in Tunisia (1800)
15. Sack of the Jewish quarter of Fez (1820)
16. Algeria and Morocco (19th century)
17. The sultan of Morocco defines Jewish rights (1841)
18. Purity of Arab land
19. Economic importance of Dhimmis and their exploitation
20. The Dhimmis as parasite or scapegoat

== Thesis ==
Bat Ye'or argues that the category of the "dhimmi" is an inferior status and compares dhimmitude to the ill-treatment of minorities in Christian lands (Muslim and Jewish). The book also contends that the safety of dhimmis in Arab lands has been fragile and at constant risk for centuries. To bolster her case, Ye'or provides a selection of primary sources describing cruel treatment of non-Muslims by Muslims.

== Reception ==
- Paul Fenton, in his 1981 review of the French edition of Le Dhimmi, noted the importance of both works, stating:
  The need for a serious and objective source book on the history of the Jews in Arab lands untainted by ideological options has long been felt by students of Middle Eastern history. The two titles under review both respond to this need, albeit in quite different, if not complementary, manners.
- Leon Nemoy, curator of Hebrew literature and Arabic literature at Yale's Sterling Memorial Library, affirmed the credibility of Ye’or’s sources, writing wrote that while one might disagree "here and there" with the major thesis propounded by Bat Ye'or, it cannot be dismissed as "a pack of lies" since her documented evidence comes from "highly reliable testimonies".
  Obviously the principal part of the book is the documentary section, which offers to the reader the original views of Muslim theologians and jurists on the general relationship between Muslims and non-Muslims, and on how non-Muslim minorities should be treated, as well as the testimony of both non-Muslim minority individuals and foreign observers as to what the Dhimmi's life was actually like. One might conceivably disagree here and there with Mme. Bat Ye'or's conclusions drawn from these documents, but one cannot challenge the original Muslim texts, or characterize all the factual accounts of both Dhimmis and foreign observers (some-if not most-of the latter were not exactly philosemites) as a pack of lies from beginning to end. These pièces justificatives are essentially highly reliable testimonies by eyewitnesses on the actual circumstances of non-Muslim life under Muslim rule throughout the medieval and modern periods of history."
- Allan Harris Cutler and Hellen Cutler (H, in a 1985 review, described the book as a "documentary history of Islamic antagonism toward Christians and Jews." They also recognized that Ye’or's perspective aligned with historical evidence of dhimmi status under Islamic rule.
  Those of us who, as disciples of Massignon, are working to achieve true reconciliation between the three Abrahamitic faiths owe a debt of gratitude to Bat Ye'or for the extreme realism of her challenging book, which in essence is a documentary history of Islamic antagonism toward Christians and Jews·[...] .Bat Ye'or believes that the practice conformed to the theory most of the time, the implication being that Islamic mistreatment of Jews and Christians throughout history was as bad as Christian mistreatment of Jews and Muslims.Other scholars with a more optimistic view of Islamic attitudes toward dhimmis hold that as often as not the Muslims in practice ignored the contempt which their sacred texts taught them to exhibit toward Christians and Jews,the implication being that on the whole Muslims treated Jews and Christians better than Christians treated Jews and Muslims.
- In 1986, Vera Bash Moreen, a scholar specializing in the history and culture of pre-modern Jewry, stated in a review published in the MESA Bulletin that
  It is seldom these days that scholars have the opportunity to encounter a book that illustrates practically all the fallacies of the professional historian. The Dhimmi of Y. Masriya is such a book [...] The Dhimmi is primarily a collection of 116 documents culled from various parts of the Muslim world over a period of time spanning eight centuries but concentrating on the nineteenth century. [...] The collection of documents assembled in this book is a valuable source-reader for students of the Middle East.[...]The overriding fallacy apparent in The Dhimmi is that of anachronism. Bat Ye'or is concerned primarily with the repercussions of the concepts of jihad and dhimma in the contemporary Muslim world and how these concepts influence the Muslim, primarily Arab, attitude towards Israel (chap. 6). [...] The Dhimmi remains a polemical work determined to demonstrate a clearly anti-Islamic approach to the subject.
  Writing in 1986 for Jerusalem Quarterly, Mark R. Cohen described the book as "a classic example" of what he identified as a "revisionist trend" by certain scholars to depict Islam as inherently antagonistic to other religions, creating a "'neo-lachrymose' conception of the Jewish past".
- Professor of Medieval Islamic history, David Waines, in a 1987 review of an English edition, writes
  Her portrait of the dhimmi, however, is executed in monochrome. The Jewish dhimmi in particular is depicted as so utterly segregated, humiliated, and impoverished that it is inconceivable that the rich Judeo-Islamic cultural tradition of the Middle Ages could ever have been created. [...] Moreover, her selection of primary documents is marred by the curious fact that the picture of the dhimmi’s condition is mainly mediated through the eyes of Europeans who journeyed to the Middle East.[...] The Dhimmi is a tract for the times and as such reveals the author more clearly to the reader than it accurately mirrors the past.
- In a 2006 review article discussing antisemitism in Muslim lands, Gudrun Krämer notes that in contrast to the "white myth" of continuous peaceful coexistence between different religious groups under Islamic rule, the portrayal offered in Ye'or's book is that of the "black myth". Krämer describes both positions as irrelevant.
- For his part, Bernard Heyberger, one of the most knowledgeable scholars of Eastern Christians, explains the resonance of this book in light of the context of its publication:

Bat Ye’or was influential because she was the first to draw attention to the phenomenon of dhimmis. And although she chose to highlight texts that supported her thesis—that Islam has always persecuted Christians—she was able to seek out Arabic documents at a time when this subject was of little interest to academia. Today, the situation is different; the topic has been well studied by various researchers, and the audience I meet during my lectures now expects less confrontational approaches. In recent years, even though references to dhimmis remain frequent on far-right websites, concern for Eastern Christians is no longer confined to Islamophobic and crusader circles.

- In 2022, Raphael Israeli the historian, professor emeritus of Middle Eastern, Islamic and Chinese history at the Hebrew University of Jerusalem, wrote in The Rebellion of the Dhimmis: The Break-up of Slavery of Christians and Jews under Islam
  Bat Ye’or’s seminal books (Note: The Dhimmi: Jews and Christians Under Islam; and The Decline of Eastern Christianity Under Islam: From Jihad to Dhimmitude) about the mistreatment, which at times ended in annihilation, of entire Christian communities in the territories occupied by the surging and conquering Islam in the Middle Ages, in the Near and Middle East, North Africa, Black Africa, Central Asia and the Balkans, did much to awaken the awareness and wariness of the contemporary politically correct West.[...] Significant reinforcements were made to Bat Ye’or’s monumental work by a large variety of scholars.
- Mohammad Ali Amir-Moezzi, whose scholarly research focuses on Shiite Islam, specifies: 'The study of texts is one thing, their interpretation is another. Bat Ye’or is someone who knows the classical texts, but like many colleagues (in one direction or another), she tends to read them in a way that is both anachronistic and one-sided.
- Martin Gilbert, In Ishmael's House: A History of the Jews in Muslim Lands. (The book The Dhimmi is cited there at least five times)
- Bernard Lewis, The Jews of Islam: "Two other works, which emphasize the negative aspects of the Muslim record, are Bat Ye’or (pseudonym), Le Dhimmi: Profil de ľoprimé en Orient et en Afrique du nord depuis la conquête arabe (Paris, 1980),
- In the collective volume led by Abdelwahab Meddeb and Benjamin Stora, A History of Jewish-Muslim Relations: From the Origins to the Present Day, it is cited once
