= Garel (surname) =

Garel is a surname. Notable people with the surname include:

- Adrien Garel (born 1996), French cyclist
- Cyriack Garel (born 1996), French footballer
- Gia'na Garel, American radio personality
- Georges Garel (1909–1979), member of the French Resistance in World War II
- Hervé Garel (born 1967), French cyclist
- Jean Garel (1852–1931), French physician
- Leo Garel (1917–1999), American artist
- Lili Garel (1921–2013), French Jewish resistance fighter
- Saskia Garel (born 1969), Canadian actress
- Sophie Garel (1942–2026), French radio and television personality and singer
- Sylvain Garel (born 1956), French politician

== See also ==
- Tristan Garel-Jones (born 1941), British politician
