= Chabannes =

Chabannes may refer to:

== Places ==
- Chabbanes, today part of Saint-Pierre-de-Fursac
  - Château de Chabannes, a castle in Saint-Pierre-de-Fursac
- Chabannes, today part of Saint-Sulpice-le-Dunois
- Chabannes, hamlet in Châteauneuf-Val-Saint-Donat

== People ==
- Adémar de Chabannes (988/989 – 1034), French monk, composer and historian
- Jacques de Chabannes (d. 1453), French military leader
- Antoine de Chabannes (d. 1488), French military leader
- Jean de Chabannes la Palice (d. 1933), French sailor
