= Lejb Wulman =

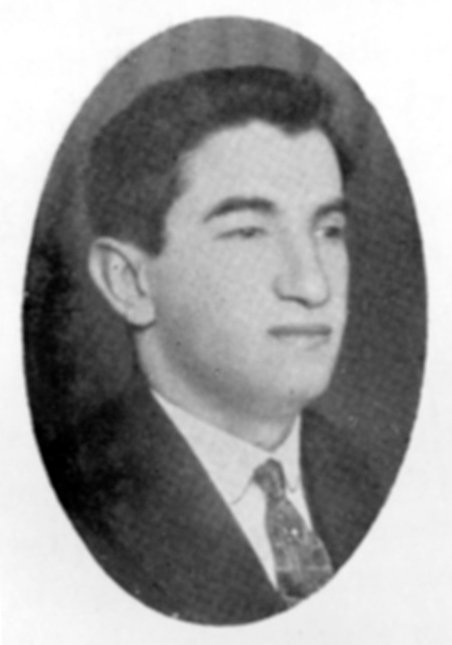
Lejb Wulman c. 1929

Lejb (Leon) Wulman (September 13, 1887, Berdychiv – April 28, 1971, New York City) was a Polish-Jewish and American physician and social activist, the co-author (with Joseph Tenenbaum) of a monograph on the Polish-Jewish physicians murdered in the Holocaust (The Martyrdom of Jewish physicians in Poland).

He was son of Szama and Chana Wulman. He studied medicine at Warsaw University and qualified as a physician in 1916. In years 1916–1921 he lived and practised in Kharkov; after 1921 he moved back to Warsaw. From 1921 to 1923 he served as deputy medical director of the Joint Distribution Committee for Poland. In 1923 he became a member and later director of TOZ (Jewish Health Organisation of Poland). In 1939 he managed to emigrate with his family to the United States.

He was a founder of the American Œuvre de secours aux enfants (OSE) Committee, and an executive director of this organisation since 1940.

Married with Esthera Szor, they had one daughter, Mary (Serafina) Wulman (born 1919). He died in New York in 1971.

== Selected works ==
- Pięć lat działalności TOZu: 1922–1926. Warszawa: TOZ, 1927
- 10 yor yidishe gezundshuts-arbet in Poyln: tsum 10-yorikn yubiley fun TOZ. Varshe: TOZ, 1933
- Na straży zdrowia ludu żydowskiego: 15 lat TOZ'u. Warszawa: TOZ, 1937
- In kamf farn gezunt fun yidishn folk. New York, 1968
