= Bat Ye'or =

British essayist (born 1933)

Gisèle Littman
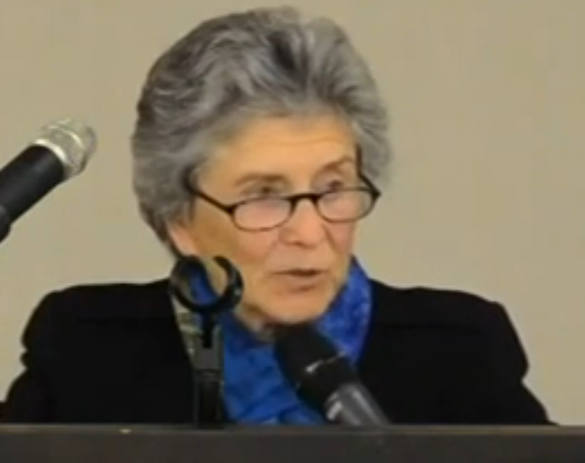
- Littman in 2014
- Born: Gisèle Orebi; 1933 (age 92–93); Zamalek, Cairo, Egypt
- Other name: Bat Ye'or (Hebrew: בת יאור)
- Education: University College London; University of Geneva
- Occupations: Writer, author
- Known for: Dhimmitude; Eurabia conspiracy theory
- Spouse: David Littman (m. 1959; died 2012)
- Children: 3

Gisèle Littman (née Orebi; born 1933), better known by her pen name Bat Ye'or (Hebrew: בת יאור, Daughter of the Nile), is an Egyptian-born, Jewish-British author, known for her promulgation of the Eurabia conspiracy theory. She claims that Islam, and its perceived anti-Americanism, anti-Christian sentiment and antisemitism hold sway over European culture and politics.

Ye'or has also written about the history of Christian and Jewish religious minorities living under Islamic governments, as part of which Ye'or has popularised the term dhimmitude to define the treatment of religious minorities in such contexts.

== Early life and education ==
Bat Ye'or was born in Cairo, Kingdom of Egypt, in 1933 into a middle-class Jewish family. Her father was Italian and had fled Italy during Mussolini's rule, and her mother was from France. She and her parents fled Egypt in 1957 after the Suez Crisis of 1956, arriving in London as stateless refugees. In 1958, she attended the UCL Institute of Archaeology and moved to Switzerland in 1960 to continue her studies at the University of Geneva, but never finished her master's degree and has never held an academic position.

She was married to the British historian and activist David Littman from September 1959 until his death in May 2012. Many of her publications and works were in collaboration with Littman. Her British citizenship dates from her marriage. They moved to Switzerland in 1960, where she has lived since, and together had three children. She has provided briefings to the United Nations and the United States Congress and has given talks at major universities such as Georgetown, Brown, Yale, Brandeis, and Columbia.

== Dhimmitude ==
Ye'or is credited with popularising the neologism dhimmitude, which she discusses in detail in her book, Islam and Dhimmitude: Where Civilizations Collide. Shahram Akbarzadeh and Joshua M. Roose suggest she equates it with servitude. Ye'or initially credited assassinated Lebanese president-elect and Phalangist militia leader Bachir Gemayel with coining the term. Later she said that she invented it herself and inspired him to use it through a friend. The term itself is derived from "dhimmi", the adjectival form of the word dhimma, which means "protection" in Arabic and refers to the historical notion of an "indefinitely renewed contract through which the Muslim community accords hospitality and protection to members of other revealed religions, on condition of their acknowledging the domination of Islam".

Ye'or describes dhimmitude as the "specific social condition that resulted from jihad", and as the "state of fear and insecurity" of "infidels" who are required to "accept a condition of humiliation." She believes that "the dhimmi condition can only be understood in the context of Jihad", and studies the relationship between the theological tenets of Islam and the hardships of Christians and Jews under Islamic rule in different times and places. The cause of jihad, she argues, "was fomented around the 8th century by Muslim theologians after the death of Muhammad and led to the conquest of large swathes of three continents over the course of a long history." Bat Ye'or acknowledges that not all Muslims subscribe to what she called "militant jihad theories of society", while arguing that the role of sharia in the 1990 Cairo Declaration on Human Rights in Islam demonstrates that what she calls a perpetual war against those who won't submit to Islam is still an "operative paradigm" in Islamic countries.

=== Reception ===
According to journalist Adi Schwartz from Haaretz, the fact that she is not an academic and has never taught at any university, but has worked independently, has, along with her opinions, made her a controversial figure. He quotes professor Robert S. Wistrich, head of the Vidal Sassoon International Center for the Study of Antisemitism, who notes:

Up until the 1980s, she was not accepted at all. In academic circles they scorned her publications. Only when Bernard Lewis published the book 'Jews of Islam' with quotations from Bat Ye'or did they begin to pay any attention to her. A real change toward her emerged in the 1990s, and especially in recent years.

Lewis on another occasion, called the notion of Jewish "dhimmi"-tude, i.e., of their "subservience and persecution and ill treatment" under Islamic rule, a "myth", which, just as the myth "of a golden age of equality, of mutual respect and cooperation", "contain[s] significant elements of truth", with the "historic truth" being "in its usual place, somewhere in the middle between the extremes." British historian Martin Gilbert in his book A History of the Twentieth Century has called her "the acknowledged expert on the plight of Jews and Christians in Muslim lands" who "brought the issue of [their] continuing discrimination to a wide public." Hans Jansen, Professor of Arabic and Islamic Studies at Utrecht University and MEP for Geert Wilders' Party for Freedom, wrote in Middle East Quarterly that "In 1985, Bat Ye'or offered Islamic studies a surprise with her book, The Dhimmi: Jews and Christians Under Islam, a convincing demonstration that the notion of a traditional, lenient, liberal, and tolerant Muslim treatment of the Jewish and Christian minorities is more myth than reality."

Mark R. Cohen said that Bat Ye'or "has made famous" the term dhimmitude, which he says is "misleading". He states that "[w]e may choose to employ" it keeping in mind that it "connotes protection (its meaning in Arabic) and that it guaranteed communal autonomy, relatively free practice of religion, and equal economic opportunities, as much as it signified inferior legal status." Michael Sells, John Henry Barrows Professor of Islamic History and Literature at the University of Chicago, argued that "by obscuring the existence of pre-Christian and other old, non-Christian communities in Europe as well as the reason for their disappearance in other areas of Europe, Bat Ye'or constructs an invidious comparison between the allegedly humane Europe of Christian and Enlightenment values and the ever-present persecution within Islam. Whenever the possibility is raised of actually comparing circumstances of non-Christians in Europe to non-Muslims under Islamic governance in a careful, thoughtful manner, Bat Ye'or forecloses such comparison."

In a review of The Decline of Eastern Christianity Under Islam: From Jihad to Dhimmitude, the American historian Robert Brenton Betts commented that the book dealt with Judaism at least as much as with Christianity, that the title was misleading and the central premise flawed. He said: "The general tone of the book is strident and anti-Muslim. This is coupled with selective scholarship designed to pick out the worst examples of anti-Christian behavior by Muslim governments, usually in time of war and threats to their own destruction (as in the case of the deplorable Armenian genocide of 1915). Add to this the attempt to demonize the so-called Islamic threat to Western civilization and the end-product is generally unedifying and frequently irritating."

Sidney Griffith, the head of the department of Semitic and Egyptian Languages and Literatures at the Catholic University of America wrote in a review of Decline of Eastern Christianity that Ye'or has "raised a topic of vital interest"; adding, however, that the "theoretical inadequacy of the interpretive concepts of jihad and dhimmitude, as they are employed here", and the "want of historical method in the deployments of the documents which serve as evidence for the conclusions reached in the study" serve as dual barriers. He goes on to say "[quotations] are presented out of context, with no analysis or explanation. One has the impression that in their bulk they are simply meant to undergird the contentions made in the first part of the book", concluding that thus Ye'or has "written a polemical tract, not responsible historical analysis." In a review of The Decline of Eastern Christianity Under Islam, City University of New York Distinguished Professor of History Chase F. Robinson writes,

[R]eaders interested in a dispassionate account of confessional relations or a nuanced discussion of the widely diverse experience of Jews and Christians in the dar al-Islam will need to look elsewhere: ... this is a work of polemic -- scholarly polemic, but polemic just the same. To list errors of fact would probably fill this entire number of the Bulletin.

According to the American scholar Joel Beinin, Bat Ye'or exemplifies the "neo-lachrymose" perspective on Egyptian Jewish history. According to Beinin, this perspective has been "consecrated" as "the normative Zionist interpretation of the history of Jews in Egypt." Robert B. Spencer, an American anti-Islamic polemicist, described her as "the pioneering scholar of dhimmitude, of the institutionalized discrimination and harassment of non-Muslims under Islamic law". He argued that she had turned this area, which he believed the "Middle East studies establishment" has hitherto been afraid of or indifferent to, into a field of academic study. Irshad Manji describes her as "a scholar who dumps cold water on any dreamy view of how Muslims have historically dealt with the 'other'."

== Eurabia conspiracy theory ==
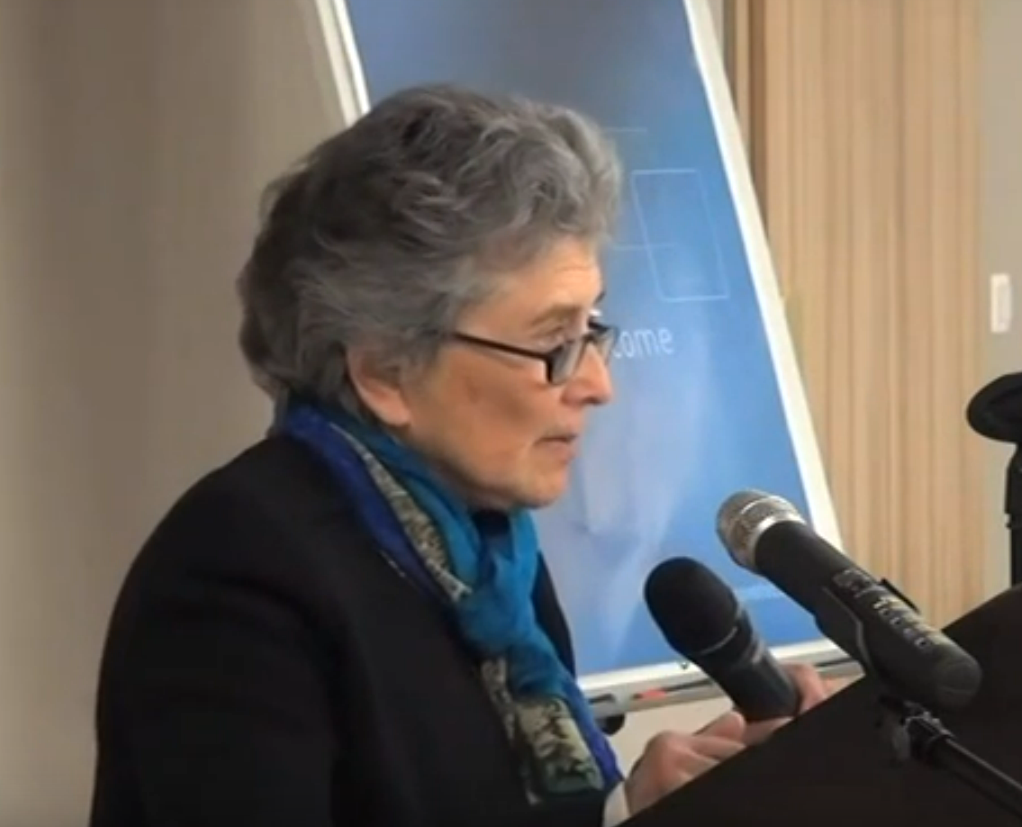
Bat Ye'or speaking at a Christian Solidarity International conference in 2014

Ye'or's books Eurabia: The Euro-Arab Axis (2005) and Europe, Globalization, and the Coming of the Universal Caliphate (2011) originated the Eurabia conspiracy theory, which alleged a relationship from the 1970s onwards between the European Union (previously the European Economic Community) and the Arab states.

=== Reception ===
The notion of "Eurabia" has been dismissed as a conspiracy theory by academics and other commentators. For example, writing in the journal Race & Class in 2006, author and freelance journalist Matt Carr states, "In order to accept Ye'or's ridiculous thesis, it is necessary to believe not only in the existence of a concerted Islamic plot to subjugate Europe, involving all Arab governments, whether 'Islamic' or not, but also to credit a secret and unelected parliamentary body with the astounding ability to transform all Europe's major political, economic and cultural institutions into subservient instruments of 'jihad' without any of the continent's press or elected institutions being aware of it."

Carr argues that Bat Ye'or is the "main inspiration" for many conspiracy theories current on the far-right. Furthermore, Carr notes that "[s]tripped of its Islamic content, the broad contours of Ye'or's preposterous thesis [in Eurabia: The Euro-Arab Axis] recall the anti-Semitic conspiracy theories of the first half of the twentieth century and contemporary notions of the 'Zionist Occupation Government' prevalent in far-right circles in the US". He notes further that Bat Ye'or's analysis is driven by a contempt of "Islam's celebrated cultural achievements" and a view of Islam as a "perennially barbaric, parasitic and oppressive religion".

In a The Jerusalem Post interview, referring to Eurabia: The Euro-Arab Axis the Jewish British historian Martin Gilbert stated "I've read Bat Yeor's book. I know her and have a great respect for her sense of anguish… I'm saying that her book – which is 100 percent accurate – is an alarm call that will ultimately prevent what she's warning about from taking place." Bruce Bawer, writing in The Hudson Review on Eurabia: The Euro-Arab Axis, wrote that "[n]o book explains the European Muslim situation, in all its complexity, more ably". "[i]t's hard to overstate this book's importance ... Eurabia is eye-opening and required reading for anyone seriously interested in understanding Europe's current predicament and its probable fate." According to Daniel Pipes, "Bat Ye'or has traced a nearly secret history of Europe over the past thirty years, convincingly showing how the Euro-Arab Dialogue has blossomed from a minor discussion group into the engine for the continent's Islamization. In delineating this phenomenon, she also provides the intellectual resources with which to resist it.

According to historian Niall Ferguson, "future historians will one day regard her coinage of the term 'Eurabia' as prophetic. Those who wish to live in a free society must be eternally vigilant. Bat Ye'or's vigilance is unrivalled." Jewish British writer David Pryce-Jones called her a "Cassandra, a brave and far-sighted spirit." Ye'or's Eurabia theory gathered additional media attention when it was quoted and praised by Anders Behring Breivik, the perpetrator of the 2011 Norway attacks, in his manifesto released on the day of the attacks. Ye'or expressed regret that Breivik took inspiration from her writings. Breivik later stated that he read and admired the work of Adolf Hitler as a teenager before he was later influenced by counter-jihad writings. In a Haaretz profile, Adi Schwartz likened her book on Eurabia to the Protocols of the Elders of Zion. Eurabia: The Euro Arab Axis has been cited as a probable inspiration for Renaud Camus's Great Replacement conspiracy theory.

== Counter-jihad ==
The international counter-jihad movement developed in the 2000s, influenced by Ye'or's Eurabia thesis. In 2007, she held the keynote speech at the inaugural international counter-jihad conference in Brussels. Ye'or also sits on the board of advisors of the International Free Press Society, identified as a "key organization" of the counter-jihad movement.

== Works ==
=== Books ===
- Understanding Dhimmitude, 2013, RVP Press, ISBN 978-1-61861-335-6 (paperback).
- Europe, Globalization, and the Coming of the Universal Caliphate, 16 September 2011, Fairleigh Dickinson University Press, ISBN 1-61147-445-0
- Verso il Califfato Universale: Come l'Europa è diventata complice dell'espansionismo musulmano, Lindau, Torino: May 2009. ("Toward the Universal Caliphate: How Europe Became an Accomplice of Muslim Expansionism")
- Eurabia: The Euro-Arab Axis, 2005, Fairleigh Dickinson University Press, ISBN 0-8386-4077-X
- Islam and Dhimmitude: Where Civilizations Collide, 2001, Fairleigh Dickinson University Press, ISBN 0-8386-3942-9; ISBN 0-8386-3943-7 (with David Littman, translated by Miriam Kochan)
- The Decline of Eastern Christianity: From Jihad to Dhimmitude;seventh-twentieth century, 1996, Fairleigh Dickinson University Press, ISBN 0-8386-3678-0; ISBN 0-8386-3688-8 (paperback).
- The Dhimmi: Jews and Christians Under Islam, 1985, Fairleigh Dickinson University Press, ISBN 0-8386-3233-5; ISBN 0-8386-3262-9 (paperback). (with David Maisel, Paul Fenton and David Littman; foreword by Jacques Ellul)
- Les Juifs en Egypte, 1971, Editions de l'Avenir, Geneva (in French, title translates as "The Jews in Egypt")
- A fiction trilogy, consisting of Moise (2020), Elie, and Ghazal and published by Les Provinciales

=== Book chapters ===
- 17 chapters in Robert Spencer (ed.), The Myth of Islamic Tolerance: How Islamic Law Treats Non-Muslims, Prometheus Books, 2005. ISBN 1-59102-249-5.
- "The Dhimmi Factor in the Exodus of Jews from Arab Countries" in: Malka Hillel Shulewitz (ed.), The Forgotten Millions. The Modern Jewish Exodus from Arab Lands, Cassell, London/New York 1999; Continuum, 2001, ISBN 0-8264-4764-3 (pp. 33–51).
- "A Christian Minority. The Copts in Egypt" in W. A. Veehoven (ed.), Case Studies on Human Rights and Fundamental Freedoms. A World Survey. 4 vols. The Hague: Martinus Nijhoff, 1976, ISBN 90-247-1779-5.
