= Dhimmitude =

Characterization of the status of non-Muslims under Islamic rule

Dhimmitude is a neologism characterizing the status of non-Muslims under Muslim rule, popularized by the Egyptian-born British writer Bat Ye'or in the 1980s and 1990s. It is constructed from the Arabic dhimmi, "non-Muslim living in an Islamic state". Akbarzadeh and Roose suggest that Ye'or equates Dhimmitude with servitude.

Bat Ye’or defines it as a permanent status of subjection in which Jews and Christians have been held under Islamic rule since the eighth century, and that forces them to accept discrimination or "face forced conversion, slavery or death". The term gained traction among Bosnian Serb forces during the Balkan wars in the 1990s and is popular among self-proclaimed counter-jihadi authors. Scholars critical of the term have dismissed it variously as misleading, muddled, polemical and even Islamophobic.

== Origin ==
The term was coined in 1982 by the President-elect of Lebanon, Bachir Gemayel, in reference to attempts by the country's Muslim leadership to subordinate the native Lebanese Christian minority. In a speech of September 14, 1982 given at Dayr al-Salib in Lebanon, he said: "Lebanon is our homeland and will remain a homeland for Christians ... We want to continue to christen, to celebrate our rites and traditions, our faith and our creed whenever we wish ... Henceforth, we refuse to live in any dhimmitude!"

The concept of "dhimmitude" was introduced into Western discourse by the writer Bat Ye'or in a French-language article published in the Italian journal La Rassegna mensile di Israel in 1983. In Bat Ye'or's use, "dhimmitude" refers to allegations of non-Muslims appeasing and surrendering to Muslims and discrimination against non-Muslims in Muslim majority regions.

Ye'or further popularized the term in her books The Decline of Eastern Christianity and the 2003 followup Islam and Dhimmitude: Where Civilizations Collide. In a 2011 interview, she claimed to have indirectly inspired Gemayel's use of the term.

== Associations and usage ==
The associations of the word "dhimmitude" vary between users:

- Bat Ye'or defined dhimmitude as the condition and experience of those who are subject to dhimma, and thus not synonymous to, but rather a subset of the dhimma phenomenon: "dhimmitude ... represents a behavior dictated by fear (terrorism), pacifism when aggressed, rather than resistance, servility because of cowardice and vulnerability. ... By their peaceful surrender to the Islamic army, they obtained the security for their life, belongings and religion, but they had to accept a condition of inferiority, spoliation and humiliation. As they were forbidden to possess weapons and give testimony against a Muslim, they were put in a position of vulnerability and humility." The term plays a key role in the Islamophobic conspiracy theory of Eurabia.
- Sidney H. Griffith states that it "has come to express the theoretical, social condition" of non-Muslims "under Muslim rule".
- According to Bassam Tibi, dhimmitude refers to non-Muslims being "allowed to retain their religious beliefs under certain restrictions". He describes that status as being inferior and a violation of religious freedom.

== Influence on Judaism ==
This Islamizing innovation, one of many formative Arabic impacts on Jewish philosophy, regarding servitude, apparent also in his language had little earlier basis in Jewish laws regarding residents in Israel (ger toshav). Noah Felodman and David Novak note that it bears a close parallel with what Islamic law requires of dhimmis, non-Muslims desiring to live unconverted in Islamic countries: "Maimonides here both borrows the Islamic legal model of subordinate status for tolerated peoples and turns it on its head by putting Jews on top and others below."

== Criticism ==
Robert Irwin's review stated that her book Islam and Dhimmitude confuses religious prescriptions with political expediency, is "relentlessly and one-sided polemical", "repetitive", "muddled", and poorly documented in terms of the original languages. Her book stretches from massacres of Jews from Muhammad's time to the poor press Israel receives in modern times. It is, he opined, a book even Israel's keenest supporters can do without. It denounces Christians for failing to back Jewish resistance to Muslim repression. Irwin thinks that the author is rankled by the failure of Palestinian Christian Arabs to assist Israel against their Muslim neighbours. He states that her facts are accurate but devoid of context: many ordinances for times of crisis had to be continually renewed and quickly fell into disuse. Both Jews and Christians often flourished, Irwin notes, under Muslim rule, and the laws of shari'a were frequently flouted. He cites Bernard Lewis's analysis of an anti-Jewish poem in terms of the envy of the writer for the fact Jews were doing rather well in the poet's milieu at that time, a point that concluded: "To the citizen of a liberal democracy, the status of dhimmi would no doubt be intolerable - but to many minorities in the world today, that status, with its autonomy and its limited yet recognized rights, might well seem enviable".

Sidney H. Griffith, a historian of early Eastern Christianity, dismissed Bat Ye'or's dhimmitude as "polemical" and "lacking in historical method", while Michael Sells, a scholar of Islamic history and literature, describes the dhimmitude theory as nothing more than the "falsification" of history by an "ideologue".

Mark R. Cohen, a leading scholar of the history of Jewish communities of medieval Islam, has criticized the term as misleading and Islamophobic. He states that "[w]e may choose to employ" it keeping in mind that it "connotes protection (its meaning in Arabic) and that it guaranteed communal autonomy, relatively free practice of religion, and equal economic opportunities, as much as it signified inferior legal status."

Bernard Lewis, Professor Emeritus of Near Eastern Studies at Princeton University, states,

If we look at the considerable literature available about the position of Jews in the Islamic world, we find two well-established myths. One is the story of a golden age of equality, of mutual respect and cooperation, especially but not exclusively in Moorish Spain; the other is of "dhimmi"-tude, of subservience and persecution and ill treatment. Both are myths. Like many myths, both contain significant elements of truth, and the historic truth is in its usual place, somewhere in the middle between the extremes.

== See also ==
- Jizya
- Persecution of Buddhists
- Persecution of Christians
- Persecution of Hindus
- Persecution of Jews
- Persecution of Muslims
- Religious discrimination
- Religious toleration
