= Madeleine Dreyfus =

French war resistor, psychologist (1909–1987)

Madeleine Dreyfus (née Kahn) (1 March 1909 – 10 January 1987) was a war resistor and psychologist from a French Jewish family. During the Second World War when the country was occupied by fascist Nazi forces, she worked with the Children's Relief Organization (abbreviated OSE) in Lyon, France, and became an important part of the Garel resistance network. After her capture in July 1944, she was sent to the Drancy camp and later to the Bergen-Belsen concentration camp. She was liberated by Allied troops in April 1945, surviving despite starvation and disease.

== Biography ==
Madeleine Kahn was born into an assimilated Jewish family on 1 March 1909 in the 9th arrondissement of Paris. After earning her Bachelor's degree, she frequented the circles of influential surrealists including those of André Breton and Jean Cocteau.

=== World War II ===
With the start of World War II in 1941, Madeleine fled to Lyon, France, with her husband and young family. There, the person who headed the OSE branch, Elisabeth (Böszi) Hirsch, asked Madeleine Dreyfus to join the French resistance to save Jewish children threatened with capture and deportation by the German Gestapo.

Having become part of the Georges Garel network in Lyon, Dreyfus took responsibility for saving Jewish children in the village of Le Chambon-sur-Lignon, in south-central France. When she first arrived in Le Chambon, she began collaborating with sympathetic villagers and pastor André Trocmé and his wife Magda Trocmé. As part of her role, Dreyfus successfully moved children between Lyon and Le Chambon for two years, placing them in safe spaces.

One of the cooperating locations was a home for deaf children in Villeurbanne where Dreyfus would place a child for safekeeping from one to several days. On 23 November 1943 or 26 November 1943, Dreyfus learned that the Gestapo were planning a raid there targeting Jewish adults and children. Dreyfus immediately set out for the town to save a Jewish child she had put there, but the Gestapo had already arrived. Dreyfus was arrested with others and taken into custody even though she was breastfeeding her two-month-old baby, Annette. Before she was taken away, she "employed a ruse" to warn her husband and children of her arrest, so the family could flee their apartment and take refuge elsewhere.

She was deported on Convoy No. 80 to the Drancy camp near Paris. Later she was taken to the German Reich with other Jewish resistance fighters to the Bergen-Belsen concentration camp via transport I.296. She survived her ordeals despite starvation and a typhus epidemic at the camp, and she was liberated 15 April 1945. She returned to Lyon.

=== After the War ===
After the Second World War, Dreyfus worked as a private psychologist and also continued her work at the Children's Relief Organization. In 1963, she was a founder of the Institute for Training and Psychosociological and Educational Studies (IFEPP).

== Decoration ==
For her heroism, Dreyfus was awarded the French Resistance Medal (decree of 31 March 1947).

== Personal life ==
In 1933, she married a businessman Raymond Dreyfus and they went on to have three children: Michel Dreyfus (born 1934), Jacques Dreyfus (born 1937) and Annette Dreyfus (born 1943).

Madeleine Dreyfus died on 10 January 1987 in the 10th arrondissement of Paris.
