= Fanny Ben-Ami =

French writer (born 1930)

Fanny Ben-Ami (née Fanny Eyal; born 19 March 1930) is a French writer and child of the Holocaust.

== Biography ==
Fanny Ben-Ami was born in 1930 in Baden-Baden, Germany, to Hirsch and Yohanna-Hannah Eyal. Her parents fled to Paris in 1933 and, after her father was arrested by the French secret police, she and her two sisters were sent by their mother to be sheltered by the charity O.S.E. (Œuvre de secours aux enfants, "Children's Aid Society"). She was housed for nearly three years in a children's home in the Creuse region of Vichy France at the Château de Chaumont in the commune of La Serre-Bussière-Vieille.

Following their betrayal to the Gestapo, the children fled to other refuges across Vichy France. At 13 and without accompanying adults, she led a group of Jewish children to neutral Switzerland, escaping from the Nazi persecution of the Holocaust. After the war she moved to a kibbutz in Israel and met her musician husband, later becoming a painter.

== Memoir ==
In 2011 her memoir Le journal de Fanny was published in France, in which she recounts the escape. A revised edition was published in 2016 with the title Le Voyage de Fanny. to tie-in with the French-Belgian film Le Voyage de Fanny (Fanny's Journey) directed by Lola Doillon, which was based on the book.

== Bibliography ==
- BAT-YAM ARTISTS (in Hebrew). BAT-YAM: BAT-YAM ARTISTS ASSOCIATION OF PAINTERS AND SCULPTORS. 2003. pp. 18―19.
