= Gitta Ryle =

Holocaust survivor, educator; public speaker

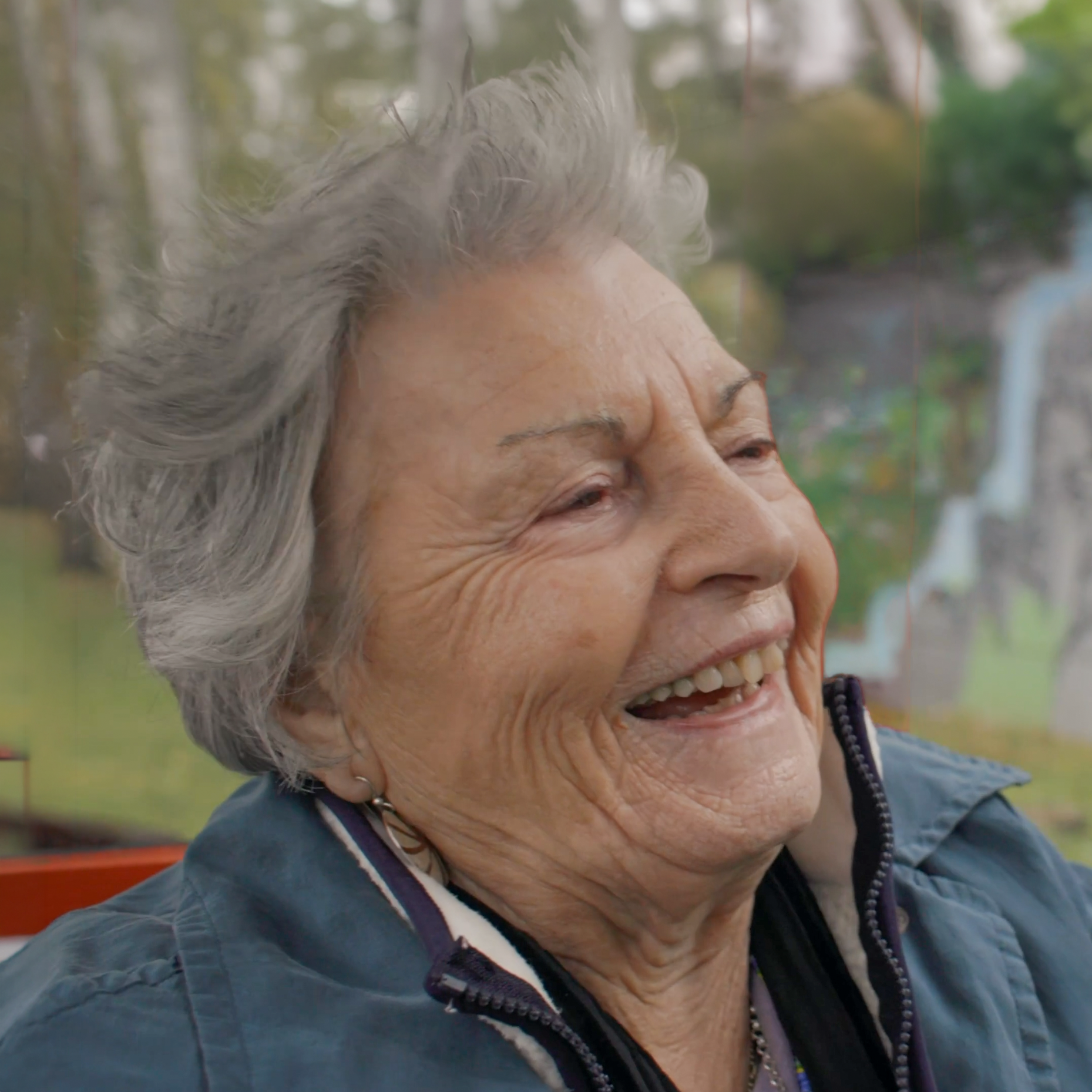
- Born: Brigitta Spindel; 10 April 1932 (age 94); Vienna, Austria
- Citizenship: Austrian/American
- Occupations: Educator; public speaker
- Known for: Holocaust survivor; subject of My Name Is Gitta

Gitta Ryle (born Brigitta Spindel 10 April 1932 in Vienna, Austria) is a Holocaust survivor, educator, and public speaker known for her testimony about survival, displacement, and forgiveness. She is the subject of the documentary film My Name Is Gitta, directed by her granddaughter, Beatrix Ryle. She resides in Santa Cruz, California, United States.

== Early life ==
Ryle was born into a Jewish family in Vienna on 10 April 1932. Her childhood was disrupted by the rise of antisemitic persecution following the Anschluss and the implementation of anti-Jewish measures in Austria.

== Rescue and hiding in France ==
As persecution intensified, Ryle and her sister were taken out of Austria by the Jewish humanitarian organization Œuvre de secours aux enfants (OSE), which specialized in rescuing and sheltering Jewish children. OSE placed them in hiding in France, where they lived in children's homes and schools for the duration of the war.

One of the principal places where Ryle was hidden was fr:Château du Masgelier, a medieval château in the Creuse department that served as an OSE children's home during the Holocaust. In later talks and interviews, Ryle has described the château and the OSE staff as central to her survival and to the protection of Jewish children during the war.

Her father escaped from Austria to Belgium and then made his way to France, where he worked near the children's home so he could visit his daughters. He was eventually denounced, arrested, and deported to Auschwitz, where he was murdered.

== Her mother's escape to England ==
Ryle's mother responded to a job announcement and was hired as a cook and dietitian in England. She was sent a ticket and remained in England until the end of the war, working in that capacity. Communication between the family members was maintained through the Red Cross in Switzerland, which forwarded letters between England and the OSE homes in France.

== Post-war life ==
After the war, Ryle and surviving family members were reunited. In the post-war years, she eventually emigrated to the United States, where she built a new life and later settled in Santa Cruz, California. She has spent decades speaking at schools, universities, and community organizations about her experiences, emphasizing the dangers of prejudice, the importance of historical memory, and her personal commitment to forgiveness. At 94 years old, Ryle attended the International Holocaust Remembrance Day event 2026 in Santa Cruz, California.

She has stated: "I want to share how I learned to have forgiveness."

== Documentary: My Name Is Gitta ==
Ryle is the central figure in the documentary film My Name Is Gitta, which follows her as she retraces her childhood journey across Austria, France, England, and the United States, revisiting places such as fr:Château du Masgelier and reconnecting with people and organizations connected to her survival.

The film is directed and written by her granddaughter Beatrix Ryle, with production by Marcus Ryle and Susan Wolf. It has a runtime of approximately 93 minutes and was released in 2026. The documentary premiered at the Dances With Films festival in Los Angeles, where it won the Documentary Feature Audience Award.

The film's trailer, released by the USC Shoah Foundation, highlights Ryle's reflections on survival, resilience, and the need to "go back to move forward," as she revisits the sites of her wartime experiences.

== Legacy ==
Through her public talks, interviews, and the documentary My Name Is Gitta, Ryle has become an important voice in Holocaust education. Her story illustrates the role of organizations such as OSE, the significance of places like Château du Masgelier, and the complex trajectories of Jewish refugees who survived by hiding, fleeing, and relying on international networks of aid. Her emphasis on forgiveness and hope has been noted in radio interviews and recorded talks.
