= Popeck =

French actor and stand-up comedian (born 1935)

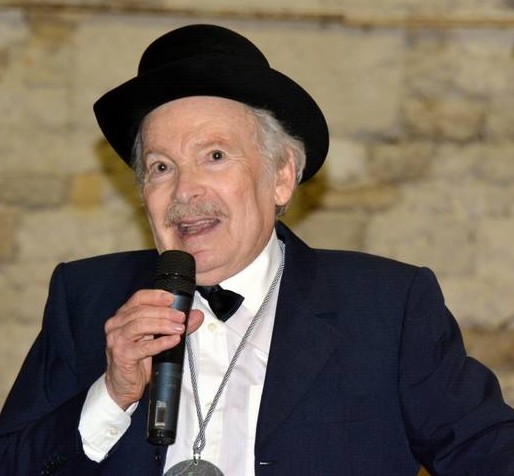
- Born: Judka Herpstu; 18 May 1935 (age 90); Paris, France
- Occupation: Humorist

Popeck (born Judka Herpstu; 18 May 1935) is a French actor and stand-up comedian.

== Early life ==
The son of Jewish immigrants from Poland and Romania, Judka Herpstu was born in Paris. He was among the children saved from the Holocaust by the OSE, spending some time at Château de Chaumont, but his mother was murdered in Auschwitz. He was reunited with his father after two years at the Chateau. He studied acting at the Cours Simon and started his career on stage under the name Jean Herbert.

== Career ==
In 1968, Herpstu created the character of Popeck, a grumpy Eastern-European immigrant dressed in a 3-piece suit, wearing a bowler hat and speaking French with a strong Yiddish accent. Sketches featuring Popeck made Herpstu known to the larger public, and the actor identified with his character so far as to adopt the name Popeck for himself in 1978.

Popeck has also acted in movies. He had a small role in Roman Polanski's The Pianist.
