= The Myth of Islamic Tolerance =

Book by Robert Spencer

- Book cover
- Author: Robert Spencer (editor)
- Language: English
- Subject: Islamic Studies
- Publisher: Prometheus Books
- Publication date: January 31, 2005
- Media type: Hardcover
- Pages: 594
- ISBN: 978-1-59102-249-7
- OCLC: 55982393
- Dewey Decimal: 297.2/8 22
- LC Class: KBP2449 .M98 2005

The Myth of Islamic Tolerance: How Islamic Law Treats Non-Muslims is a collection of 63 essays edited by Robert Spencer. It deals with the history of non-Muslim populations during and after the conquest of their lands by Muslims.

== Overview ==
The book contains 17 chapters by Bat Ye'or, as well as essays by Ibn Warraq, Walid Phares, David Littman, Patrick Sookhdeo, and Mark Durie. The writers opine that attitudes of Muslims today are informed by the tenets of Islam. It covers topics including sharia law and antisemitism.

== Chapters ==
- I. Islamic tolerance: myth and reality
- II. Islamic law regarding non-Muslims
- III. Islamic practice regarding non-Muslims
- IV. The myth and contemporary geopolitics
- V. Human Rights and Human Wrongs at the United Nations
- VI. The Myth in contemporary academic and public discourse

== Reviews and reception ==
A November 2004 review of the book in Publishers Weekly said the book's theme "merits exploration", but that the book does not explain why Islam is "inherently intolerant". An August 2005 review of the book in Asia Times opined that:

... The Myth of Islamic Tolerance warrants our attention. Any study of contemporary Islam would be incomplete without it. Collectively, the essays expose an unsettling fact: that Islam's famed tolerance of non-Muslims has over the centuries fallen well short of an embrace ... However, the book is full of flagrant distortions and glaring omissions.

The book was reviewed in the September 2005 issue of The Middle East Journal. A review in the June 2006 issue of First Things said that the book "might be described as an extended bill of indictment against Islam and a debunking of the still commonly heard claim that Islam has been and is tolerant of minorities."

Writing in National Review in March 2007, Dinesh D'Souza described The Myth of Islamic Tolerance as being attractive to those who would like to criticize Muslims at large for 9/11. He suggested that the book uses a strategy of selective quotations from the Koran, which he calls "history for dummies".

Dr. Akbar Ahmed, professor of Islamic studies at American University, described the book as an example of one of the most humane religions in the world being misrepresented as a violent one. In his book Beyond the Veneer, Ioannis Gatsiounis says that the book "struggles to find an enlightened balance", as it sometimes overlooks complexities while at the same time avoiding a trend in many circles of viewing the issue it addresses solely as a non-religious one.

== See also ==
- Islam and Judaism
- Golden age of Jewish culture in Spain
