= Goldziher Prize =

The Goldziher Prize has been awarded since 2010. The prize was originally awarded to scholars and activists working in the arena of interfaith relations and scholarship, honoring Prof. Mark Cohen (2010), Rabbi Burton Visotzky (2012), Prof. Josef Meri (2014), Mr. Daoud Abudiab and Mr. Bernhard Werthan (2016). In 2017 and 2019, the Goldziher Prize was presented by Merrimack College’s The Center for the Study of Jewish-Christian-Muslim Relations, an independent college in the Catholic Augustinian tradition, and The William and Mary Greve Foundation. In 2019, the Religion News Foundation, the educational and charitable arm of the Religion News Association, joined the effort. In 2022, The William and Mary Greve Foundation, under the leadership of John W. Kiser will sponsor the prize.

The six 2019 winners were: Sana Ullah, photography; Hannah Allam, writing; Leila Fadel, audio, Zainab Sultan and Si Chen, film; and Aymann Ismail, video. In 2017 there were three winners: Joshua Seftel, Samuel Freedman, and Robin Wright.

In the early phase, The Goldziher Prize in Jewish-Muslim Relations was awarded biennially by the Center for the Study of Jewish-Christian-Muslim Relations, Merrimack College. According to the Center's website, winners received a prize of $25,000.00 award "for work that contributes significantly to reverence, understanding and collaboration in common moral purposes between Jews and Muslims." The award is named after Ignac Goldziher.

== Winners ==
- 2010 Mark R. Cohen
- 2012 Burton L. Visotzky
- 2014 Josef Meri
