= Fanny's Journey =

- Theatrical release poster
- Le Voyage de Fanny
- Directed by: Lola Doillon
- Screenplay by: Anne Peyregne; Lola Doillon
- Based on: Le journal de Fanny by Fanny Ben-Ami
- Produced by: Saga Blanchard; Marie de Lussigny
- Starring: Léonie Souchaud; Fantine Harduin; Juliane Lepoureau
- Cinematography: Pierre Cottereau
- Edited by: Valérie Deseine
- Music by: Sylvain Favre-Bulle
- Production companies: Origami Films; Bee Films
- Distributed by: Metropolitan Filmexport (France)
- Release dates: 24 April 2016 (COLCOA); 18 May 2016 (France)
- Running time: 94 minutes
- Countries: France; Belgium
- Language: French
- Budget: $7.8 million
- Box office: $1.1 million

Fanny's Journey (original title: Le Voyage de Fanny) is a 2016 French-Belgian children's war drama film co-written and directed by Lola Doillon. The film is inspired by the autobiographical memoir Le journal de Fanny by Fanny Ben-Ami.

== Plot ==
During WWII, a group of French Jewish children, who had been sheltered in Vichy France by the Jewish charity Œuvre de secours aux enfants for three years, must flee to Italian occupied France when the Germans occupy Vichy France and again to neutral Switzerland after the Germans occupy the Italian zone following Italy's armistice with the Allies, leaving their family and teachers behind.

== Cast ==
- Léonie Souchaud as Fanny
- Fantine Harduin as Erika
- Juliane Lepoureau as Georgette
- Ryan Brodie as Victor
- Anaïs Meiringer as Diane
- Lou Lambrecht as Rachel
- Igor van Dessel as Maurice
- Malonn Lévana as Marie
- Lucien Khoury as Jacques
- Cécile de France as Madame Forman
- Stéphane De Groodt as Jean
- Elea Körner as Helga
- Alice D'Hauwe as Ethel
- Jérémie Petrus as Julien

== Reception ==
Variety described it as "a handsome, compelling period piece that deftly portrays events through the eyes of its young protagonists."

== Awards ==
The film won the Best Narrative Audience Award at the Philadelphia Jewish Film Festival CineMondays, and the Best Narrative Audience Award at the Atlanta Jewish Film Festival in 2017.
