= The Decline of Eastern Christianity Under Islam =

1991 book by Bat Ye'or

The Decline of Eastern Christianity Under Islam: From Jihad to Dhimmitude
- Author: Bat Ye'or
- Language: French; English
- Subject: Islamic empire's conquests.
- Genre: Islamic history
- Publisher: Les Editions du Cerf; Fairleigh Dickinson Univ Pr
- Publication date: July 1991; September 1, 1996
- Publication place: France; United States
- Media type: Print (Hardcover, Paperback), E-book
- Pages: 522
- ISBN: 978-0838636787
- OCLC: 876802597

The Decline of Eastern Christianity Under Islam: From Jihad to Dhimmitude is a 1991 book by author Bat Ye'or. In the book the author describes her interpretation of the waning of the Eastern Christendom under the Islamic empire's conquests. The book was first published in France as Le déclin du christianisme oriental: Entre jihad et dhimmitude VIIe-XXe siècle in 1991 with a foreword by Jacques Ellul and was translated into English in 1996.

== Thesis and structure ==
Bat Yeor described the thesis of her book as: "This is not a book about Islam; it neither examines its expansion nor its civilization. Its objective is the study of that multitude of peoples subjected by Islam, and to determine as far as possible the complex processes—both endogenous and exogenous—that brought about their gradual extinction. A phenomenon of dissolution, which after all is hardly exceptional, and is part and parcel of the evolutionary cycle of societies… I have approached this theme as the object of historical research and have not considered it necessary to resort to apologetic formulas or historical embellishments, which under the cover of objectivity, have unfortunately become the norm in this field. Evidently, such a study can only project a negative picture of the Muslim peoples, since it is integrated, sometimes by political design, within the actual process of the disintegration experienced by the conquered peoples. Despite this important disadvantage, I did not feel it expedient to abandon my research, thinking that the prestige of a civilization, which has made such eminent contributions at both the cultural and scientific levels, would hardly suffer if, alongside its splendid and triumphant epic, a very small place was set aside for these forgotten peoples. I hope that I shall not be unduly criticized for offering them a tribute of well-deserved sympathy and respect".

The book consists of two parts, an analysis, which aims to paint a broad picture of the conversion of the Near East to Islam, and an appendix containing selected primary sources. The book focuses only upon the Christian communities in Iran, Mesopotamia, Armenia, Anatolia, the Levant, Egypt, Libya and the Maghreb. Yeor argues that the way that lands were once solidly Christian such as what is now modern Turkey, Syria, Iraq, and Egypt that became solidly Muslim over the centuries were due to what she called dhimmitude, arguing that the status of being a dhimmi (a non-Muslim under Muslim rule) was a second-class one that eventually forced the vast majority of the Christians to convert to Islam. The emphasis of the analysis lies on the near past, especially the 19th century. The appendix contains translations of Islamic and non-Islamic sources from the Middle Ages and Western sources of newer date.

== Reviews ==
=== Academic ===
German orientalist Holger Preissler, in a review positive to the ambition and subject of the book, writes that the book curiously does not cite readily available high quality sources, and that Ye'Or overplays the role of jihad in modern times. He also points out that in criticising frequent one-sided and apologetic uses of Islamic sources, Ye'Or fails to avoid going to the opposite extreme, particularly in the documentation part of the book. In a negative review, the American orientalist Chase F. Robinson called The Decline of Eastern Christianity a pseudo-history that was "a work of polemic" whose errors were too numerous to list in his review. Robinson wrote those interested "...in a nuanced discussion of the widely diverse experiences of Jews and Christians in the dar al-Islam will need to look elsewhere".

Sidney H. Griffith writes that Bat Yeor raised important inter-religious problem but the book itself is problematic as Griffith points out : "They [the documents used as sources] are presented out of context with no analysis or explanation... The trouble with The Decline of Eastern Christianity is that in spite of the gathering of an enormous amount of historical material, and although she has raised an issue that well deserves study, Bat Ye'or has written a polemical tract, not responsible historical analysis. Meanwhile, the historical question remains to be answered: why is it that from the mid-7th century to the 20th century the number of Christians in the Islamic world has dwindled from a majority in many areas of the Middle East to virtual insignificance in terms of demography? Is it really due to the net effects of the disabilities prescribed by Islamic law for the dhimmi? Or are there other factors?"

In a review of The Decline of Eastern Christianity Under Islam: From Jihad to Dhimmitude the American historian Robert Brenton Betts commented that the book dealt with Judaism at least as much as with Christianity, that the title was misleading and the central premise flawed. He said: "The general tone of the book is strident and anti-Muslim. This is coupled with selective scholarship designed to pick out the worst examples of anti-Christian behavior by Muslim governments, usually in time of war and threats to their own destruction (as in the case of the Turk-perpetrated Armenian genocide of 1915). Add to this the attempt to demonize the so-called Islamic threat to Western civilization and the end-product is generally unedifying and frequently irritating."

=== Other ===
The Catholic convert and minister Richard John Neuhaus wrote that the book "tells the story straight, thus countering the Islamophile histories that have dominated Western thought for so long".

== See also ==
- Criticism of Islam

== Sources ==
- Robinson, Chase F. (July 1997). "Review of The Decline of Eastern Christianity Under Islam, from Jihad to Dhimmitude: Seventh-Twentieth Centuries". Review of Middle Eastern Studies. 31 (1): 97–98.
- Thomas, David (May 1998). "Review of The Decline of Eastern Christianity Under Islam, from Jihad to Dhimmitude by Bat Ye'or". British Journal of Middle Eastern Studies. 25 (1): 583–585.
