= Château de Chaumont (La Serre-Bussière-Vieille) =

Château in Nouvelle-Aquitaine, France

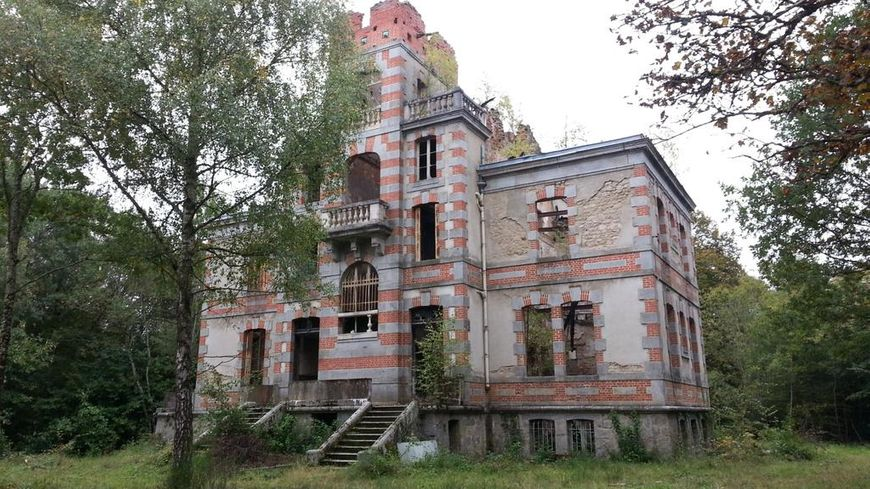
- Château ruins in 2017

- Location within France

General information
- Status: Undergoing restoration
- Location: Chaumont, La Serre-Bussière-Vieille, France
- Coordinates: 46.0518°N 2.3650°E

Website
- chateauchaumont.fr

Château de Chaumont is a 19th‑century château in Chaumont, straddling the municipalities of Mainsat and La Serre-Bussière-Vieille, in the Creuse department of the Nouvelle-Aquitaine region in central France. It is currently undergoing extensive restoration. The access road (rue de Chaumont) lies within Mainsat, while the building itself stands in the neighbouring commune of La Serre-Bussière-Vieille.

== History ==
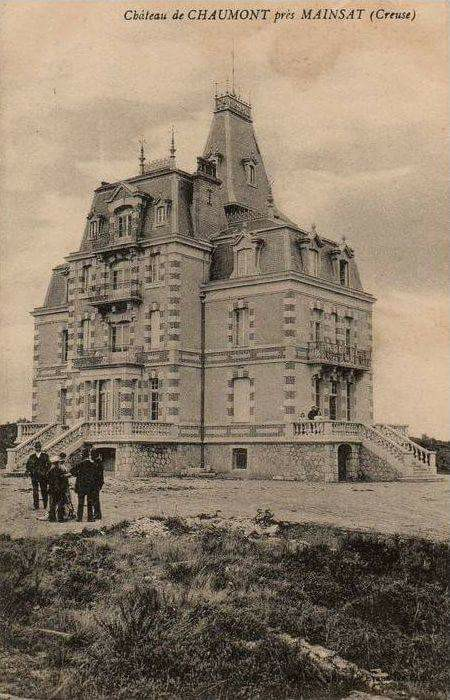
Old postcard showing the rear façade of the château

The château was built in 1886 as a home for the opera singer Eugénie Bardet and her daughter, Gilberte.

=== Children's home providing refuge for Jews (1939–1945) ===
From 1939, the château was rented to the charity Œuvre de secours aux enfants (OSE) ("Children's relief work"). From 1940, the history of the château is linked to the rescue of Jews during the Second World War. The Creuse department welcomed approximately 3,000 Jews including 1,000 children between 1939 and 1945. The OSE had three secular reception centres for children in Creuse, including Chaumont, directed by Lotte Schwarz. The Synagogue de Neuilly, created in 1866 in the Paris region, moved in 1939 due to the German occupation of the city to Creuse as it was in the zone libre ("free zone").

In 1940 French humourist Popeck, then four years old, took refuge at the château until 1942. Memoirist Fanny Ben-Ami and her sisters sheltered there for three years before the children were betrayed.

The concert promoter Bill Graham, later based in San Francisco, also spent part of his childhood at the château as a child refugee from the Nazis before traveling to the United States.

At the entrance to rue de Chaumont there is a commemorative plaque.

=== Fire and abandonment ===
When Gilberte Bardet died, her heirs decided to sell the château. In 1967 it was purchased by Jean‑François Mironnet, Coco Chanel's steward, and his wife, a former model. Chanel herself never owned the property.

In February 1986, the building was destroyed by fire and only the external walls remained standing. Mironnet's wife, alone in the château at the time of the fire, managed to escape from the flames by tying bed sheets through a window.

In 2017 the property was put up for sale on the French classified ads website Leboncoin.

=== Restoration (2022–present) ===
In 2022 Dan Preston, an English expatriate and founder of the YouTube channel Escape to rural France, purchased the château for a sum total of €60,000 and started its complete restoration. Preston's reconstruction was also featured in the television series, Help! We Bought a Village. In one episode he met Popeck in Paris and learned of his wartime memories of the château.

On 25 September 2022, Preston published the first video in a series documenting his restoration of the château, on his YouTube channel. The project has since been chronicled through regular video updates. Initial work concentrated on clearing the site, including the removal of trees and rubble from the fire-damaged structure. By April 2023, Preston had completed the first newly constructed internal floor, enabling further stabilisation of the building. Work on a new roof structure began in December 2023, and the principal roof frame was finished in the spring of 2025. In January 2026, Preston and his team installed slate tiles and copper sheeting on the château's roof, a process documented in video updates. The château has been reconnected to mains electricity and water, and a new garden has been laid out on the surrounding grounds.
