= Adi Schwartz =

Israeli journalist and academic

Adi Schwartz (Hebrew: אדי שוורץ) is an Israeli journalist and academic. A former staff writer for Haaretz, he currently works as a freelance journalist for Israeli and international newspapers and magazines. His primary fields of interest include the Arab–Israeli conflict and Israeli and Jewish current affairs.

== Career ==
After reading Western History at Tel Aviv University, Schwartz took a position with Haaretz in 1999. His career with Haaretz, with whom he remained as "a staff writer and a senior editor" until 2009, took him across the world, with assignments in "Brussels, London, Rome and Latin America". He has written freelance for other media and serves as the Israeli correspondent for British magazine Monocle. He also maintains a blog in which he posts already published articles and publicizes new articles.

Schwartz is employed by Sapir College as a journalism teacher and speaks publicly as a guest lecturer and commentator in his field.

With Einat Wilf, he has coauthored a book, The War of Return: How Western Indulgence of the Palestinian Dream Has Obstructed the Path to Peace.

=== Antisemitism ===
Schwartz has written about various aspects of antisemitism. Schwartz has published several articles about the controversy surrounding Ariel Toaff's book about the blood libel of Trento.

==== Belgian politicians and antisemitism ====
Schwartz wrote a reportage about Antwerp's Jewish community increasing support of Vlaams Belang, a right-wing Flemish nationalist and secessionist political party, following the increase of attacks of antisemite nature in Belgium (this article was cited in Bat Ye'or's book Eurabia: The Euro-Arab Axis).

Schwartz later interviewed Filip Dewinter, a leading member of Vlaams Belang. During the interview Dewinter went a great length to prove he is not connected to antisemitism, and revealed that his father was taken to forced labor in Germany and that his grandfather was a member of the Dutch Resistance.

Schwartz also interviewed Belgian Prime Minister Guy Verhofstadt. Verhofstadt stated that attacking Jews "because they are Jews", or saying that "the Jewish state cannot exist" are all forms of antisemitism.

=== Holocaust ===
Schwartz wrote about the role of the Belgian authorities in the persecution and deportation of the Jews during World War II, about Mimi Reinhard, Oskar Schindler's secretary, about Katrin Himmler's book "The Himmler Brothers: A German Family History", and various other aspects of the Holocaust.

==== Pope Pius XII ====
Schwartz published a series of articles about Pope Pius XII and his role in the Holocaust. Schwartz criticized Pius who haven't exercised his influence in regions with large concentrations of Catholics, like Croatia, Slovakia and Hungary, to rescue Jews. Schwartz also wrote about Israeli minister Isaac Herzog opposition to the beatification of Pope Pius XII, and the Vatican officials furious reaction over Herzog's comments.

=== Muhammad al-Durrah ===
Schwartz has published several articles about the Muhammad al-Durrah incident for Haaretz. Schwartz was the first Israeli journalist to conduct a thorough interview with Philippe Karsenty about his misgivings regarding the incident. Schwartz wrote a follow-up about the incident in which he discussed the ballistic report by Jean-Claude Schlinger.

== Views ==
=== Israel's right to exist ===
Schwartz criticizes in his articles those who object to Israel's right to exist. Schwartz claimed that "the discussion of Israel's right to exist is no longer just the realm of Arab parties in conflict with Israel, and has become part of the European and American discourse". Schwartz pointed out articles written by American-Jewish historian Tony Judt and by Norwegian intellectual Jostein Gaarder as denouncing Israel's right to exist. Schwartz characterized Gaarder's article as layered with "harsh religious, eschatological and apocalyptic elements, which resembled a messianic prophecy" (see Tony Judt's views about Israel and Jostein Gaarder controversy).

=== Religion and the Holocaust ===
Schwartz highly criticized Pope Benedict XVI interpretation of the role of religion in the Holocaust. Pope Benedict have said: "In the darkest period of German and European history, an insane racist ideology born of neo-paganism gave rise to the attempt to exterminate European Jewry" and "The holiness of God was no longer recognized, and consequently contempt was shown for the sacredness of human life". Schwartz argued that the Pope's interpretation of Holocaust history is "more troubling and less exact". Schwartz claimed that:

This interpretation is very convenient for the Church, of course. It distinguishes between what he calls a secular, pagan, "insane" Europe, which does not recognize the holiness of God, and a religious, sane, peace-mongering Europe. As far as Ratzinger is concerned, the Holocaust took place because of non-recognition of the Christian faith.

In response to the historical claim made by Pope Benedict, Schwartz stated that:

The Holocaust took place on Christian soil, including Catholic Bavaria, where Ratzinger was born. It was made possible, at the very least, by the collaboration of Poles, Hungarians, Austrians, French and Belgians – all of them members of the Catholic community. This collaboration was achieved in part due to the heritage of anti-Semitism that was the legacy of the Church, the same Church that massacred Jews during the Crusades and established the first ghettoes.
