= Josef W. Meri =

American historian (born 1969)

- Born: 1969 December 23; Chicago, IL
- Other names: Yousef Meri; Josef Waleed Meri; Yousef Waleed Meri; يوسف مرعي
- Citizenship: American
- Education: U.C. Berkeley; Oxford University
- Known for: Islamic History; Islamic Studies; Muslim-Jewish Relations
- Notable work: Medieval Islamic civilization: an encyclopedia, Cult of Saints among Muslims and Jews in Medieval Syria

Josef (Yousef) Waleed Meri (Arabic: يوسف وليد مرعي Yūsuf Walīd Marʿī) is an American historian of Interfaith Relations in the Middle East and the history of religion.

== Career ==
He is a visiting faculty member at Georgetown University, Qatar. He is also an Associate of the Prince Alwaleed Bin Talal Center for Muslim-Christian Understanding at Georgetown University. Meri was a Senior Associate of the Center for the Study of Jewish-Christian-Muslim Relations, Merrimack College which closed in 2020.

From 2018 to 2023, he was a faculty member at Hamad Bin Khalifa University, Doha, Qatar. From 2013 to 2014, Meri served as eighth Allianz Visiting professor of Islamic Studies at LMU Munich. He was also a Fellow of St. Edmund's College, Cambridge, Cambridge University, and a visiting fellow at the Centre of Islamic Studies, Cambridge University.

Meri is the winner of the 2014 Goldziher Prize in Jewish-Muslim Relations awarded by the Center for the Study of Jewish-Christian-Muslim Relations, Merrimack College.

== Bibliography ==
=== Books and edited volumes ===
- (ed. and contributor) Medieval Islamic Civilization: An Encyclopedia, 2 vols. (Abingdon, Oxon. and New York: Routledge, 2017 (Volume 1: ISBN 978-1138061002) (Volume 2: ISBN 978-1138061316)
- (ed.) Jewish-Muslim Relations in Past and Present: A Kaleidoscopic View (Leiden: Brill, 2017)(ISBN 9789004235809)
- (ed. and contributor) The Routledge Handbook of Muslim-Jewish Relations (New York: Routledge, 2016)(ISBN 978-0415-64516-4).
- The Cult of Saints among Muslims and Jews in Medieval Syria (Oxford: Oxford University Press, 2002) (ISBN 0-19-925078-2).
- (ed. with Farhad Daftary) Culture and Memory in Medieval Islam (London and New York: I.B. Tauris, 2003) (ISBN 1-86064-859-2).
- (ed. and trans.) A Lonely Wayfarer's Guide to Pilgrimage: Ali ibn Abi Bakr's Kitab al-Isharat ila Ma'rifat al-Ziyarat (Princeton: Darwin Press, 2004) (ISBN 0-87850-169-X).
- (ed. and contributor) Medieval Islamic Civilization: An Encyclopedia, 2 vols. (New York: Routledge, 2006) (ISBN 0-415-96690-6).
- (ed.) Bayān al-Farq bayn al-Ṣadr wal-Qalb wal-Fuʾād wal-Lubb (بيان الفرق بين الصدر والقلب والفؤاد واللب], Second revised edition (Amman: The Royal Islamic Strategic Studies Centre, 2012. First published 2009) (ISBN 978-9957-8533-5-8).
