= Operation Mural =

1961 transfer of Moroccan Jews to Israel

Operation Mural was a clandestine effort headed by Mossad, Israel's intelligence agency, to circumvent the Moroccan prohibition of Jewish emigration and facilitate the migration of Jewish Moroccan children to Israel. The operation was arranged in coordination with the Œuvre de secours aux enfants.

== Background ==
After gaining independence from France in 1956, the Moroccan government restricted Jewish emigration out of the country. In response, the Israeli government tasked Mossad with facilitating such emigration, using clandestine means. The Mossad initially organized illegal departures by boats, but that effort came to a halt in 1961 after the Egoz disaster, in which a ship carrying 44 immigrants capsized, drowning all passengers.

== Operation Mural ==
A new approach was then implemented: Working with the Swiss-based NGO Œuvre de secours aux enfants – the Organization for the Rescue of Children – an offer was made to the Moroccan government to take Moroccan children on a vacation in Switzerland. Mossad agents then worked in the Jewish community to find families interested in emigration. Once there, the Jewish children would be flown to Israel instead of returning to Morocco.

In 1961, David Littman volunteered for the mission. Littman thought he was working for the Jewish Agency – years later it was revealed it was arranged with the assistance of the Mossad. From March–July 1961, posing with his wife and baby daughter as Christians, Littman ran the Casablanca office of the Geneva-based international NGO for children Œuvre de Secours aux Enfants de l'Afrique du Nord (OSSEAN). His code name was "Mural", and the code name for the mission was "Operation Mural". After months of negotiation by Littman, the children left Morocco in five convoys under the guise of a supposed holiday in Switzerland (with Littman accompanying the last convoy), and from Switzerland went to Israel. In all, he assisted in evacuating 530 Jewish children to Israel. The children's families joined them several years later.

Meanwhile, Mossad agents Gad Shahar and Pinhas Katsir moved from house to house in Casablanca and persuaded the children's parents to allow their children to go to Israel without them with the risk that the Moroccan authorities might find out. According to Shahar, "Throughout the entire length of the operation, he (Littman) himself did not know that he was working for the Mossad. He thought he was working for the Jewish Agency and that the masses of children and parents who were knocking at the door of his office in Casablanca had come to him in response to advertisements that had been published in the Moroccan press. In fact, hardly a single Jew had seen those notices. They were important only for the cover. The parents and children came to him as a result of our secret work, going from door to door and to reach the members of the community." These were the last of Moroccan immigrants in this country before the gates were closed to Jewish emigration.

25th anniversary of Operation Mural in 1986 was held in Ashkelon Conference of the children who came. The conference brought together the couple with grown-up children Littman and Littman, won an award for his work. After months of negotiation by Littman with the authorities – including holidays for Muslim groups in August – the Jewish children left Morocco in five convoys from 26 June to 24 July under the guise of a supposed holiday in Switzerland (with Littman accompanying the last convoy), and from Switzerland went to Israel. In all, Littman assisted in evacuating 530 Jewish children to Israel without the authorities realizing his goal. With the agreement of the Moroccan authorities he used special 'collective passports' and four months later this system was accepted by King Hassan II in an agreement for the exodus of 100,000 Jews from 1962 to 1964 in what became known as the Mossad's "Operation Yakhin".

An article about Operation Mural by Shmuel Segev was published in the magazine Maariv in 1984. Littman's work was then recognized by President Chaim Herzog and later President Shimon Peres, who presented him with the Mimouna award in 1986.

On June 1, 2008, Israeli President Shimon Peres honored Littman at a Presidential residence special commemorative event with his wife and family and former key Mossad agents in attendance, In his brief address, Peres said:

Well, it is a belated ceremony, but it doesn't lose its value, because what you did stands on its own legs and is not affected by time.... [T]he saving of 530 children is, I imagine, the most moving experience a man can have. You say in Hebrew: 'The one who saves one life, is like the one that saved the life of the whole world.' But when you save 530 children, it's really unforgettable. I want to express, on behalf of our people, our nation, our recognition of your courage, your wisdom, of your determination under extremely difficult conditions.

A year later the Israel Intelligence and Commemoration Center (MLM) honored Littman in a ceremony on 1 July 2009, when the "Hero of Silence" Order was conferred on him, he being the 9th person to receive it since 1985 ("An order of highest esteem and appreciation, awarded to David Gerald Littman: A clandestine warrior, who risked his life and who served a sacred cause of the People and of the State of Israel").

In March 2009, Le Soir Échos, a Casablanca newspaper, interviewed Littman and published the Operation Mural story. It was the first time that Moroccans learned about the affair.
