= Lili Garel =

WWII French Resistance fighter

Élise "Lili" Garel (née Tager; 5 July 1921, Paris – 9 November 2013, Paris) was a French Jewish resistance fighter who, with her husband Georges Garel (né Grigori Garfinkel) saved many Jewish children during the Shoah.

== Biography ==
Élise Tager was born in 1921 in Paris. Her parents were Russian Jews who emigrated to France in 1919. She participated in the Demonstration of 11 November 1940 of high school and college students at Place de l'Étoile and was imprisoned as a Jew for three months in Fresnes Prison. She took refuge in Lyon at the end of 1941.

== Resistant ==
Lili Garel, as a courier between Nice and Lyon, participated in the rescue of Jewish children, with her husband, Georges. After the war, Georges Garel became firstly director general, then president of l'Œuvre de secours aux enfants (OSE). Her resistance name was Elisabeth-Jeanne Tissier. She was imprisoned at Fort Montluc in Lyon.

During the "night of Vénissieux" (28–29 August 1943), 108 Jewish children and 80 adults were taken out of the internment camp in Vénissieux (Lyon metropolitan area) and saved from deportation. Shortly after this event, in 1943, Lili Tager and Georges Garel married.

Vénissieux marked the beginning of Georges Garel's action in the field with the OSE, until then he had been an engineer in Lyon, and it was also Lili Tager's first involvement in the field. At 20 years of age, she had just been hired in the OSE office in Lyon, as a part-time secretary and as a social worker. Years later, she had not forgotten the "nightmare" of Vénissieux. Georges Garel's memoir was published thanks to the "tenacious will" of his wife. Historian Valérie Perthuis-Portheret made a film which chronicles the life of Lili Garel, and in particular her role in the "night of Vénissieux".

== Family ==
Georges and Lili Garel had seven children: Jean-Renaud, polytechnician and biochemist; Anne, doctor; Michel, curator of Hebrew manuscripts at the National Library of France; Laurent, doctor; Thomas, normalien and physician; Denis, doctor; and Nathalie, publicist. Georges Garel died in 1979. Lili Garel died in Paris on 9 November 2013, at the age of 93.

== Honours ==
- Honoured at the United States Holocaust Memorial Museum in Washington, D.C., in November 2000.
- The headquarters of the Children's Aid Work (OSE) at 11 Rue du Faubourg-du-Temple in Paris, until then known as the 'Centre Georges Garel', became the 'Centre Georges and Lili Garel', on 23 June 2014.

== Bibliography ==
- Deborah Dwork, Children with a Star: Jewish Youth in Nazi Europe. Yale University Press, 1993; ISBN 0300054475, ISBN 9780300054477
- Valérie Perthuis, Le sauvetage des enfants juifs du camp de Vénissieux : août 1942, (tr. "The Rescue of Jewish Children from the Vénissieux Camp: August 19422), Lyon, Editions lyonnaises d'art et d'histoire, 1997; (ISBN 2-84147-048-2)
- Deborah Dwork & Robert Jan Pelt. Holocaust: A History. W.W. Norton & Company, 2002. ISBN 0393051889, ISBN 9780393051889
- Georges Garel. Le sauvetage des enfants juifs par l'OSE. (tr. "The rescue of Jewish children by the OSE"). Editions Le Manuscrit, 2012; ISBN 2304040462, ISBN 9782304040463
