= David Littman (activist) =

British historian and human rights activist

David Gerald Littman
- Born: 4 July 1933; London, England
- Died: 20 May 2012 (aged 78); Switzerland
- Citizenship: British
- Education: BA and MA degrees
- Alma mater: Canford School, Dorset, England; Trinity College, Dublin; University of London
- Known for: Operation Mural; Representation at the UN; historian
- Spouse: Bat Ye'or (m. 1959–2012)
- Children: 3
- Awards: "President's private Commemoration" for Operation Mural in Casablanca 1961 by Israeli President Shimon Peres; "Hero of Silence" Order from Israel Intelligence Heritage & Commemoration Center Mossad 2009

David Gerald Littman (4 July 1933 – 20 May 2012) was a British political activist. He is known for organising the Operation Mural.

== Biography ==
David Littman was born on 4 July 1933, in London, England. He was educated at Canford School, Dorset, England (1951), and Trinity College, Dublin, where he earned his BA with honours and MA degrees in Modern History and Political Science, followed by post-graduate studies at the Institute of Archaeology, University of London. He married his wife Gisèle (née Orebi; originally from Egypt and later known by her pen name Bat Ye'or), in September 1959. They moved to Lausanne, Switzerland, the following year.

The Littman Library of Jewish Civilization was founded by his brother, Louis Littman.

== Operation Mural ==
In 1961, Littman volunteered for a clandestine humanitarian mission to evacuate Jewish children from Morocco to Israel, via Switzerland. Moroccan Jews had been forbidden from leaving the country since 1956. Littman thought he was working for the Jewish Agency – years later it was revealed it was arranged with the assistance of the Mossad. From March–July 1961, posing with his wife and baby daughter as Christians, Littman ran the Casablanca office of the Geneva-based international NGO for children Oeuvre de Secours aux Enfants de l'Afrique du Nord (OSSEAN). His code name was "Mural", and the code name for the mission was "Operation Mural". After months of negotiation by Littman, the children left Morocco in five convoys under the guise of a supposed holiday in Switzerland (with Littman accompanying the last convoy), and from Switzerland went to Israel. In all, he assisted in evacuating 530 Jewish children to Israel. The children's families joined them several years later.

An article about Operation Mural by Shmuel Segev was published in the magazine Maariv in 1984. Littman's work was then recognized by President Chaim Herzog and later President Shimon Peres, who presented him with the Mimouna award in 1986. A documentary film on the operation, filmed by Yehuda Kaveh, screened in 2007.

On 1 June 2008, at a special private commemorative event at the presidential Jerusalem residence – with Littman, his wife, two children, three grandchildren and former key agents from the Mossad, who had worked with Littman – Israeli President Shimon Peres, said:

"Well, it is a belated ceremony, but it doesn't lose its value, because what you did stands on its own legs and is not affected by time. I think that the saving of 530 children is, I imagine, the most moving experience a man can have. You say in Hebrew: 'The one who saves one life, is like the one that saved the life of the whole world.' But when you save 530 children, it’s really unforgettable. I want to express, on behalf of our people, our nation, our recognition of your courage, your wisdom, of your determination under extremely difficult conditions".

A year later Littman was honoured by the Israel Intelligence Heritage and Commemoration Center in a unique ceremony on 1 July 2009, with 200 persons, when the "Hero of Silence" Order was conferred on him, he being the 9th person to receive it since 1985. ("An order of highest esteem and appreciation, awarded to David Gerald Littman: A clandestine warrior, who risked his life and who served a sacred cause of the People and of the State of Israel"). A few months earlier a Casablanca French newspaper, Le Soir Echos, interviewed him through a Swiss colleague, with their own questions; and published the Operation Mural story integrally in four successive issues (23–26 March) with their own positive titles and sub-titles throughout, and no editing. It was the first time that Moroccans learned about the affair.

== Activism ==
In 1970, the Littmans helped to found the Centre d'Information et de Documentation sur le Moyen Orient (CID) in Geneva, which published studies on Middle East subjects until the mid-1980s. He supervised its publications until 1974, and then served as an advisor.

Since 1986, he has appeared several times before the United Nations Human Rights Council (formerly the United Nations Commission on Human Rights) on behalf of various NGOs. From 1986 to 1991 he was main representative of the World Union for Progressive Judaism (WUPJ). In February 1992, he joined René Wadlow (main representative of the International Fellowship of Reconciliation; (IFOR)), then with the World Federalist Movement (WFM). He has been an accredited representative for the Association of World Citizens (AWC) and for the Association for World Education (AWE) since 1997, and an accredited representative and main spokesman for the WUPJ again since 2001. He has made oral and written statements (some jointly) at the UN Commission on Human Rights for the WUPJ, IFOR, WFM, International Committee for European Security and Cooperation (ICESC), Christian Solidarity International (CSI), Simon Wiesenthal Center, International Humanist and Ethical Union (IHEU), AWC, AWC, and other NGOs.

=== Release of Russian Jews ===
In March 1987, the Soviet delegation to the UN walked out when Littman arranged for Natan Sharansky to speak to the Commission about refuseniks. Also in 1987, he accused the Soviet delegate of antisemitism when he appeared before the UN Commission on Human Rights. In 1988 he requested that several Jews in the USSR who were refused permission to emigrate should be allowed to do so. He repeated the request to Boris Yeltsin in 1991. In August 1989, he appeared before the Commission representing WUPJ.

=== Hamas ===
From January 1989 Littman sought to make public at the commission the fact that Hamas in its ideology calls for the annihilation of Israel, and points to Islamic texts for support of its position.

=== Release of Syrian Jewish women ===
In October 1990, as the WUPJ's representative to the commission, he petitioned for the release of single Jewish women from Syria; in March 1991 he requested that they appoint a special representative to investigate; and in August 1991, he urged it to work for their release.

=== Lebanese Jewish hostages ===
In August 1991, he appeared before the commission on behalf of the WUPJ to urge the release of Lebanese Jews held as hostages in Lebanon. In December 1991, he wrote a letter on behalf of the WUPJ appealing to UN Secretary-General Javier Pérez de Cuéllar, asking him to discover the fate of the 11 Lebanese Jews who had been kidnapped in the mid-1980s.

=== Claim of UN conference being hijacked ===
Israel withdrew from the Durban World Conference Against Racism in 2001, joining the United States in protest of what it described as anti-Israel and antisemitic remarks. The Hindu reported that Littman and World Union for Progressive Judaism Rabbi Francois Garai filed a statement saying that the conference had been "hijacked by dictatorial regimes" and was preparing a "jihad against Israel."

=== Christoph Blocher ===
In December 2003, when Christoph Blocher, who was known in the first instance for his inflammatory anti-immigrant rhetoric, won a seat in the Swiss Federal Council, Littman defended him from charges of antisemitism, saying "I personally do not accept the accusation that he is anti-Semitic and await with interest the new policies he will propose for Switzerland."

=== Shariah, violence against women, and antisemitism ===
The New York Daily News referred to Littman as a "rare but tenacious [voice] who confront[s] Islamic human rights abuses at the UN at every turn," and cited his complaining to the Council that Iranian law "still allows the marriage of girls at only 9 years old, and justifies the stoning of women for alleged adultery." In 2007 he held a keynote speech at the international counter-jihad conference in Brussels along with Bat Ye'or.

When Littman sought to make a three-minute statement before the council's eighth session in June 2008 (on behalf of the AWE) with regard to various forms of violence against women (including female genital mutilation) and shariah, he was blocked after 22 seconds from finishing his statement. Representatives from Egypt, Pakistan, and Iran (speaking on behalf of the Organisation of the Islamic Conference) forced a halt to the proceedings, saying that any discussion of Islamic religious law was insulting to the faith. After deliberations, Council president Doru Romulus Costea of Romania said: "The Council is not prepared to discuss religious questions and we don’t have to do so. Declarations must avoid judgments or evaluation about religion." He told Littman to amend his remarks. Littman gave an amended statement and released copies of the original statement for review. A similar incident occurred at the council's ninth session, when Littman had prepared a text protesting the antisemitic writings of the Grand Sheikh of Al-Azhar University in Egypt. He was ordered by the new Council President Martin Ihoeghian Uhomoibhi to desist. In March 2009 he was again denied the opportunity to speak, this time for being "off topic" when calling for a universal condemnation of defamations of Judaism during a discussion of freedom of expression and hate speech.

=== Writings ===
Early in his career, Littman's writings were published in the Wiener Library Bulletin, a periodical of the Wiener Library. Others were published by the CID, which disseminated its publications by mailing them to prominent people and institutions. He also published historical writings with Les Editions de l'Avenir, which distributed its publications in a similar manner. Since 1971, Littman has published articles on historical and human rights issues in academic journals, including in Jean-Paul Sartre's Les Temps Modernes, in the press, and in three books. He also published a chapter in The Century of Moses Montefiore (1985), published by the Littman Library of Jewish Civilization, under the auspices of the Oxford University Press.

Littman contributed multiple chapters to The Myth of Islamic Tolerance: How Islamic Law Treats Non-Muslims (2005), edited by Robert Spencer.

He translated many articles by Bat Ye'or into English and co-translated three of her major books, the last published in 2005.

== Published work ==
- Jews and Arabs: myths and realities, David Littman, 1973
- Arab theologians on Jews and Israel: extracts from the proceedings of the fourth conference of the Academy of Islamic Research, D. F. Green (pen name of Littman and Yehoshafat Harkabi), Majmaʻ al-Buḥūth al-Islāmīyah, Éditions de l'avenir, 3 eds. in English, 2 eds. in French, 1ed. in German (over 70,000 copies of all editions), 1974
- "Jews under Muslim Rule in the late Nineteenth Century," Wiener Library Bulletin 28, n.s. 35/36 (1975)
- "Jews under Muslim Rule, II: Morocco 1903–1912", Wiener Library Bulletin 29, n.s. 37/38 (1976)
- "Protected Peoples under Islam" by David Littman and Bat Ye'or, CID, Geneva, 1976
- "Quelques Aspects de la Condition de Dhimmi: Juifs d'Afrique du Nord avant la Colonisation," in Yod, Revue des Etudes Hébraiques et juives modernes et contemporaines, (Publications Orientalistes de France), 2: 1, October 1976 (+ Geneva, Avenir, 10 May 1997)
- Peuples protégés en terre d'Islam, by David Littman, Centre d'Information et de Documentation sur le Moyen-Orient, 1977
- "Jews under Muslim Rule: The Case of Persia," Wiener Library Bulletin, 32, n.s. 49/50 (1979)
- "Les Juifs en Perse avant les Pahlevi," Les Temps Modernes, 395, pp. 1,910–35, Juin 1979
- The Century of Moses Montefiore, (ed. Sonia and V.D. Lipman), "Mission to Morocco (1863–1864)", pp. 171–229, by David Littman, in Oxford University Press, 1985
- L'histoire du relief de Jérusalem (1864–1985), by David Littman, Centre d'information et de documentation sur le Moyen-Orient, 1986
- Statements made by the representatives of the World Union for Progressive Judaism David Littman and Martin Gilbert forty-third session; UN Commission on Human Rights, Geneva, [2 February – 13 March], 1987, Union mondiale pour le judaïsme libéral, Martin Gilbert, David Littman, WUPJ, UN. Commission des droits de l'homme, 1987
- "Human Rights and Human Wrongs," N° 1 – 11, 344 pages (verbatim oral and written statements: 1986–91 made by all accredited representatives of the WUPJ to the UNCHR and UN Sub-Commission, Geneva: 84 texts, of which 68 (oral) and 9 (written) by David Littman, WUPJ, Geneva, 1986–91
- "Utopia: A 'United States of Abraham'," Part 5, Chapter 48 (pp. 453–68) (Lecture: Society for Semitic Studies, Lund University, Sweden, 23 November 1994). Part 5, Chapter 48 (pp. 453–68), in The Myth of Islamic Tolerance
- "The U.N. Finds Slavery in the Sudan ", Middle East Quarterly (Philadelphia), September 1996
- "Quelques Aspects de la Condition de Dhimmi: Juifs d'Afrique du Nord avant la Colonisation," in Yod, Revue des Etudes Hébraiques et juives modernes et contemporaines (Publications Orientalistes de France), 2: 1, October 1976 (Geneva, Avenir, 10 May 1997)
- "Dangerous Censorship of a U.N. Special Rapporteur," Rene Wadlow and David Littman, Justice (Tel Aviv) No. 14, September 1997
- "UN Special Rapporteur Censured on Islamist and Arab Antisemitism," by Rene Wadlow and David Littman, Midstream, vol. 44, pp. 8–12, February–March 1998
- "Universal Human Rights and 'Human Rights in Islam,'" Midstream (New York) February/March 1999, pp. 2–7
- "Islamism Grows Stronger at the United Nations," Middle East Quarterly, September 1999, vol. 6, No. 3, pp. 59–64
- "Syria's Blood Libel Revival at the UN: 1991–2000," Midstream, February/March 2000
- "Jihad and Jihadist Bombers; What’s in a name?", David G. Littman, National Review, 9 September 2002
- "The Genocidal Hamas Charter; Yasser Arafat & co.", David G. Littman, National Review, 26 September 2002
- "The Truth About the Mideast; Fourteen fundamental facts about Israel and Palestine", by David G. Littman, National Review, 7 October 2002
- "The Forgotten Refugees; An exchange of populations", David G. Littman, National Review, 3 December 2002
- "Human Rights and Human Wrongs; Sharia can’t be an exception to international human-rights norms", by David G. Littman, National Review, 19 January 2003
- "Islamists' Perpetual Jihad," David G. Littman, FrontPageMagazine, 15 August 2003
- "Yasser's Terrorist Jesus," by David G. Littman, FrontPageMagazine, 15 November 2004
- The Myth of Islamic Tolerance: How Islamic Law Treats Non-Muslims, edited by Robert Spencer, "Human Rights and Human Wrongs at the United Nations," Part 5 (pp. 305–472), David G. Littman, Prometheus Books, ISBN 1-59102-249-5, contributor of multiple chapters, 2005
- Copts in Egypt: A Christian Minority under Siege; papers presented at the First International Coptic Symposium, Zürich, September 23–25, 2004, Martyn Thomas, Adly A. Youssef, "Need of a State for all Citizens," by David Littman, Vandenhoeck & Ruprecht, ISBN 3-85710-040-0, ISBN 978-3-85710-040-6, 2006
- Encyclopedia of the Jewish diaspora: origins, experiences, and culture, Volume 1, M. Avrum Ehrlich, p. 382, "Modern Jewish Refugees from Arab Countries," David G. Littman, ABC-CLIO, ISBN 1-85109-873-9, ISBN 978-1-85109-873-6, 2008
- "L'Exil au Maghreb, La condition juive dans l'Islam, 1148–1912", Paul B. Fenton et David G. Littman, 17 November 2010, Presses de l'Université Paris-Sorbonne, ISBN 978-2-84050-725-3
