= Château de Chabannes =

French orphanage that housed Jewish refugees during the Holocaust

Coordinates: 46.1622°N 1.4801°E

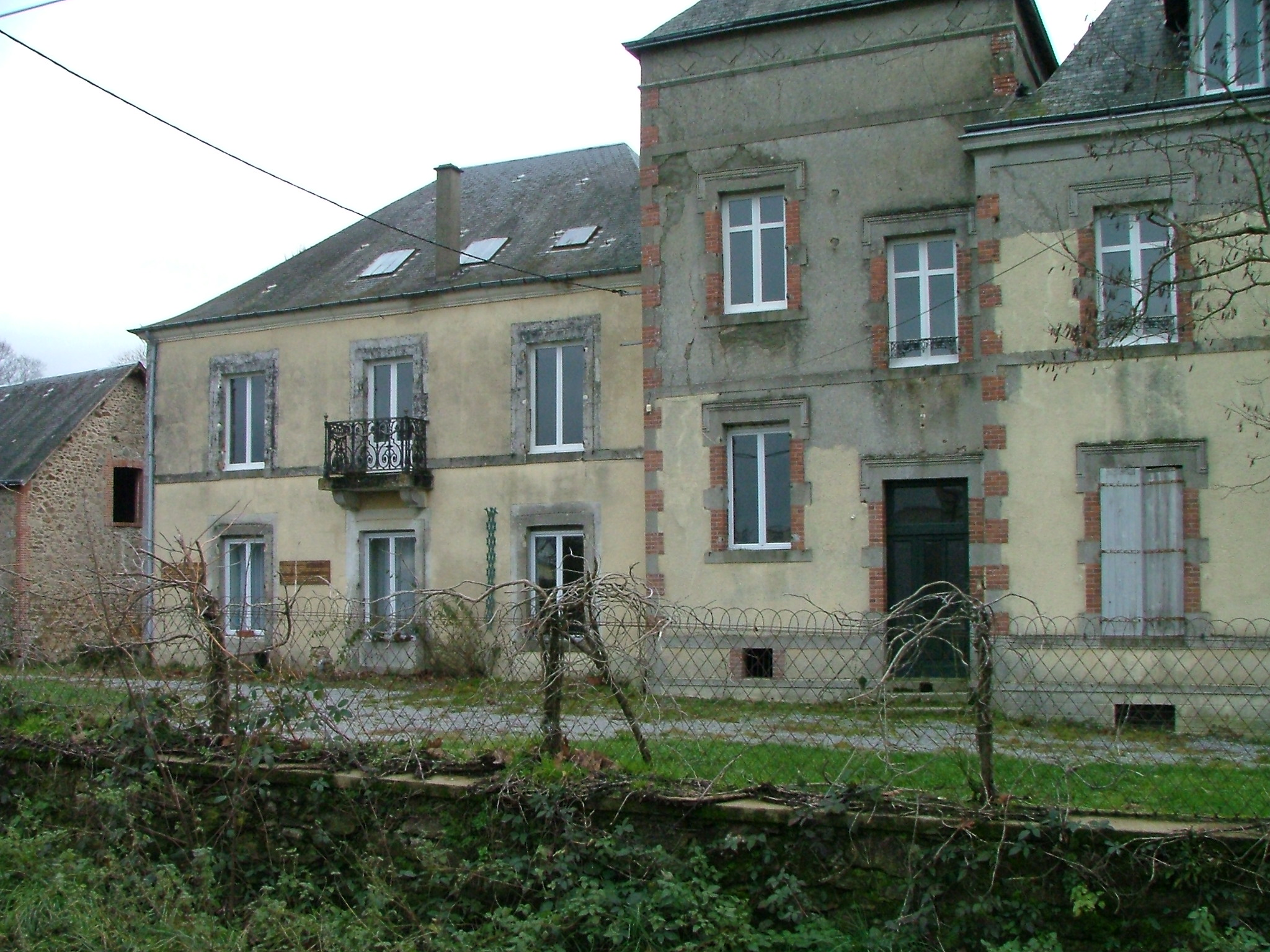
Château de Chabannes, where 400 Jewish refugee children were hidden during the Holocaust.

Château de Chabannes was an orphanage in the village of Chabannes (part of today's Saint-Pierre-de-Fursac) in Vichy France where about 400 Jewish refugee children were saved from the Holocaust by efforts of its director, Félix Chevrier and other teachers. It was operated by Œuvre de secours aux enfants (OSE) from 1940 to 1943.

It is the subject of a 1999 documentary, The Children of Chabannes, by filmmakers Lisa Gossels (whose father and uncle were among the survivors) and Dean Wetherell.
