= Martin Ihoeghian Uhomoibhi =

Nigerian diplomat

Martin Uhomoibhi
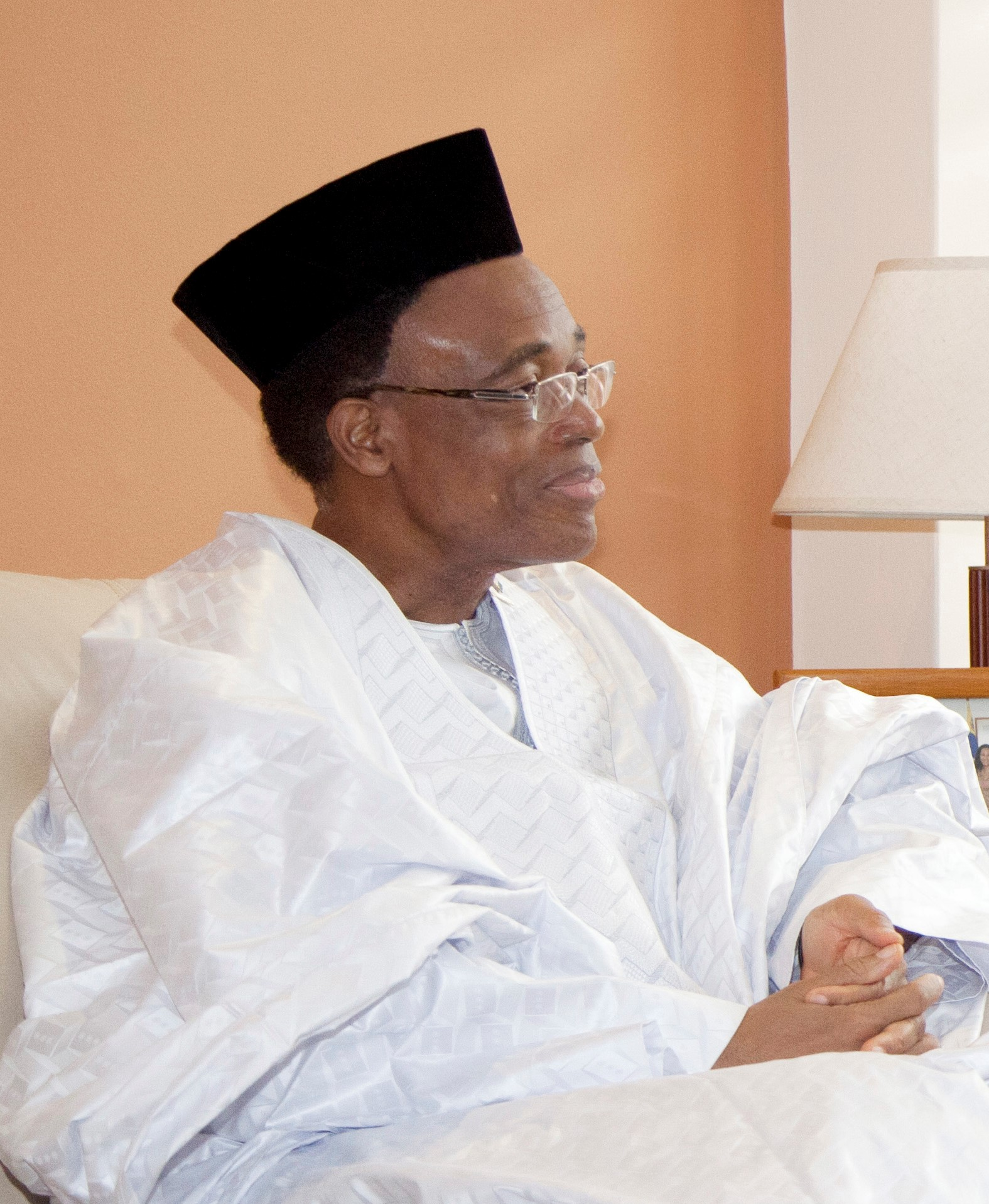
- whilst visiting Ecuador
- Born: 2 November 1954 (age 71); Edo State, Nigeria
- Education: University of Ibadan, University of Oxford
- Occupation: Diplomat
- Known for: Joint Special Representative for Darfur
- Children: 4

Martin Ihoeghian Uhomoibhi is a Nigerian diplomat. He is best known as the former President of the United Nations Human Rights Council. Uhomoibhi's term as President was from 19 June 2008 to 18 June 2009. Martin Uhomoibhi served as Permanent Secretary of the Nigerian Ministry of Foreign Affairs. In October 2015 he was appointed Joint Special Representative for Darfur and Head of the African Union-United Nations Hybrid Operation in Darfur (UNAMID).

== Early life and education ==
A native of the Ewatto Community, Esan South-East Local Government Area of Edo State, Uhomoibhi was born 3 November 1954 in Nigeria.

Uhomoibhi graduated from Nigeria's University of Ibadan in 1976 with a bachelor's degree in history. He also holds a master's in history and political science from the University of Ibadan and a D. Phil. from Oxford University in Modern History and International Relations.

== Career ==
From 1977 to 1984, Uhomoibhi was a lecturer in diplomatic and African history at the University of Ibadan. He began his diplomatic career in 1984 by joining the Ministry of Foreign Affairs as a Senior First Secretary. From 1993 to 1995, he served as coordinator and alternative representative of Nigeria to the Security Council in New York. From 1995 to 1999, Uhomoibhi served as Nigeria's Special Assistant to the Minister for Foreign Affairs. In 1999, he was the Consul-General of Nigeria in Atlanta, with responsibility for United States-Nigeria relations in the southeastern United States. From 2000 to 2003, Uhomoibhi was Minister and Deputy Head of Mission to the Nigerian Embassy in Addis Ababa while he served as his country's representative to the African Union and to the Economic Commission for Africa. From July 2003 to January 2004, he was Deputy Director and Head of Division for Inter-African Affairs at the Ministry of Foreign Affairs of Nigeria. From 2004 to 2007, Uhomoibhi was the acting Director of the Office of the Permanent Secretary in the Ministry of Foreign Affairs. Then he became the Nigerian ambassador to Switzerland and Nigeria's Permanent Representative to the United Nations Office in Geneva. From September 2007, he was also the President of the General Assembly of the World Intellectual Property Organization.

After his retirement from the civil service of the Federal Republic of Nigeria as the longest permanent secretary of the ministry of foreign affairs in November 2014, ambassador Martin opened an institute called Pan African Institute for Global Affaires and Strategy (PAIGAS) where he is the president.

On 28 October 2015, United Nations Secretary-General Ban Ki-moon and African Union Commission Chairperson Nkosazana Dlamini Zuma announced the appointment of Martin Ihoeghian Uhomoibhi of Nigeria as their Joint Special Representative for Darfur and Head of the African Union-United Nations Hybrid Operation in Darfur (UNAMID), with responsibilities including those of African Union-United Nations Joint Chief Mediator.

== United Nations Human Rights Council ==
During Uhomoibhi's presidency, the Council adopted the Optional Protocol to the International Covenant on Economic, Social and Cultural Rights. The Protocol will allow persons to petition an international human rights body about violations of rights guaranteed in the Covenant. In December 2008, the Council considered human rights abuses in the Democratic Republic of Congo, and celebrated the sixtieth anniversary of the Universal Declaration of Human Rights.
