= La Serre-Bussière-Vieille =

Commune in Nouvelle-Aquitaine, France

- Commune
- Location of La Serre-Bussière-Vieille
- Location within France Location within Nouvelle-Aquitaine
- Coordinates: 46°03′26″N 2°19′17″E
- Country: France
- Region: Nouvelle-Aquitaine
- Department: Creuse
- Arrondissement: Aubusson
- Canton: Aubusson
- Intercommunality: CC Marche et Combraille en Aquitaine

Government
  - Mayor (2020–2026): Denise Giraud-Lajoie
- Area^{1}: 14.41 km^{2} (5.56 sq mi)
- Elevation: 602 m (1,975 ft)
- Highest elevation: 613 m (2,011 ft)
- Lowest elevation: 420 m (1,380 ft)
- Population (2023): 120
  - Density: 8.3/km^{2} (22/sq mi)
- Time zone: UTC+01:00 (CET)
  - Summer (DST): UTC+02:00 (CEST)
- INSEE/Postal code: 23172 /23190
- ^{1} French Land Register data, which excludes lakes, ponds, glaciers > 1 km^{2} (0.386 sq mi or 247 acres) and river estuaries.

La Serre-Bussière-Vieille (French pronunciation: [la sɛʁ bysjɛʁ vjɛj]; Occitan: La Serra e Bussiera Vielha) is a commune in the Creuse department in the Nouvelle-Aquitaine region in central France.

== Geography ==
A farming area comprising two small villages and a few hamlets situated some 10 miles (16 km) northeast of Aubusson, on the D24 road.

The river Tardes forms most of the commune's western border.

== Population ==
Historical population
Year	Pop.	±% p.a.
1968	213	—
1975	193	−1.40%
1982	147	−3.81%
1990	117	−2.81%
1999	110	−0.68%
2007	125	+1.61%
2012	123	−0.32%
2017	122	−0.16%
2023	120	−0.28%
Source: INSEE

== Sights ==
- The 14th-century church at La Serre.
- A dolmen, the "Pierre-sous-Pèze" at the hamlet of Planchat.
- Two châteaux, at Buxerolle and at Chaumont.

== See also ==
- Communes of the Creuse department
