= Islam and Dhimmitude =

2001 book by Bat Ye'or

Islam and Dhimmitude: Where Civilizations Collide
- Author: Bat Ye'or
- Translator: Miriam Kochan, David Littman
- Language: French
- Subject: Dhimmis (Islamic law), Islamic Empire—Ethnic relations, Islamic countries—Ethnic relations
- Publisher: Fairleigh Dickinson University Press
- Publication date: 2001
- Media type: Print (Hardcover)
- Pages: 528p.
- ISBN: 978-0838639436
- OCLC: 47054791
- Dewey Decimal: 909/.09767
- LC Class: DS36.9.D47 B395 2002

Islam and Dhimmitude: Where Civilizations Collide is a book by Bat Ye'or.

== Reception ==
Norman A. Stillman, Professor of Judaic History at the University of Oklahoma, in his review for Israel Studies Forum, says

"For Bat Ye'or dhimmitude is itself a civilisation, which she defines as "a comprehensive system of laws, traditions and culture evolving in duration according to specific and structural parameters, which maintain its homogeneity, its behavioural patterns and their transmission." Dhimmitude she argues is not only a civilisation, but it is the mindset and behaviour patterns of the non-Muslim people's themselves. ... As with her previous books, this one marshals a great deal of evidence, and has some very valid points to make, but again, as with her former efforts, the material is so one-sidedly selective, so oversimplified, and her rhetoric so hyperbolic and bathetic that whatever merits there are in her arguments are thoroughly overshadowed by the tendentiousness of the polemics."
