= Saint-Pierre-de-Fursac =

Part of Fursac in Nouvelle-Aquitaine, France

- Part of Fursac
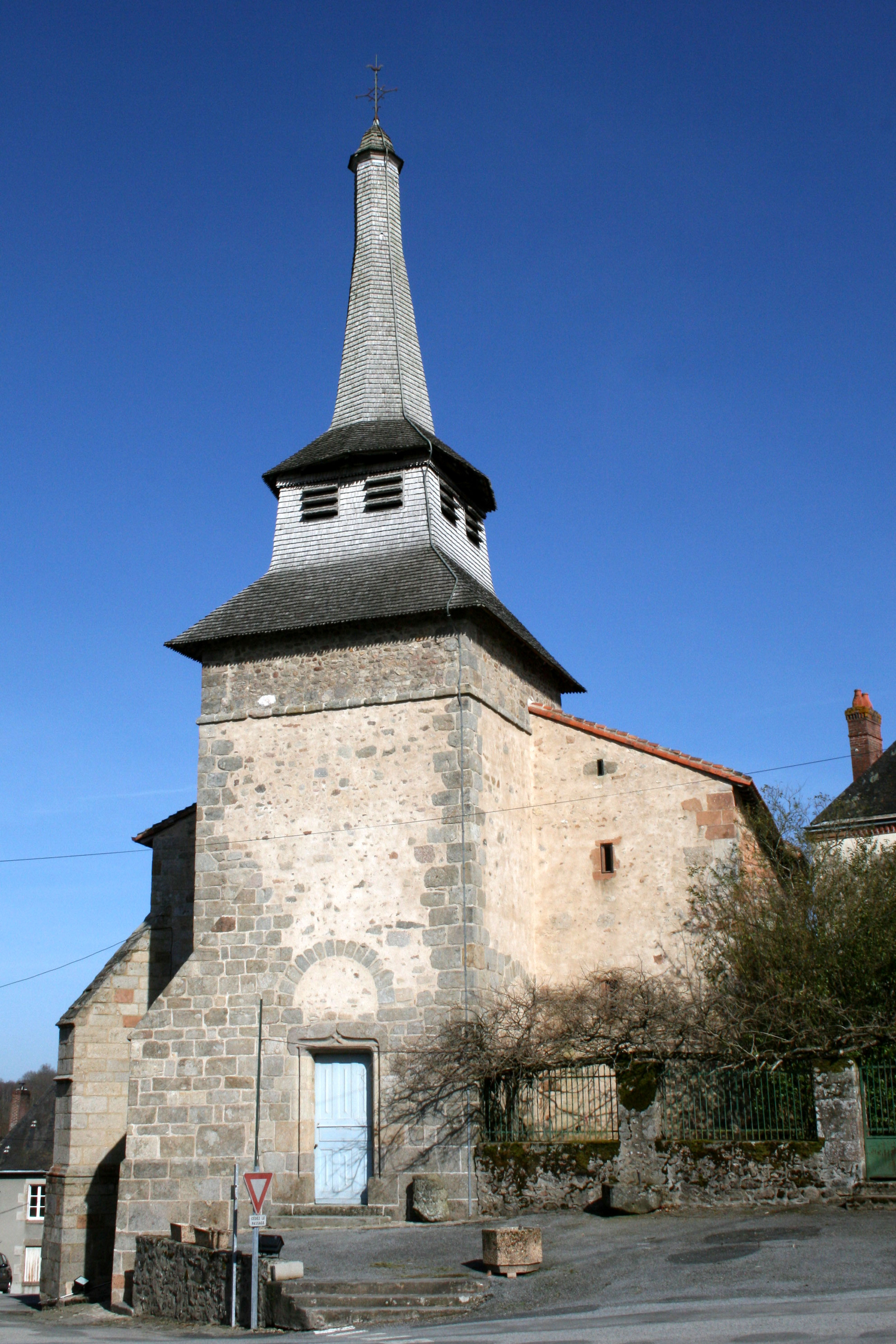
- The church in Saint-Pierre-de-Fursac
- Location of Saint-Pierre-de-Fursac
- Location within France Location within Nouvelle-Aquitaine
- Coordinates: 46°08′56″N 1°30′47″E
- Country: France
- Region: Nouvelle-Aquitaine
- Department: Creuse
- Arrondissement: Guéret
- Canton: Le Grand-Bourg
- Commune: Fursac
- Area^{1}: 27.33 km^{2} (10.55 sq mi)
- Elevation: 340 m (1,120 ft)
- Highest elevation: 431 m (1,414 ft)
- Lowest elevation: 315 m (1,033 ft)
- Population (2018): 748
  - Density: 27.4/km^{2} (70.9/sq mi)
- Time zone: UTC+01:00 (CET)
  - Summer (DST): UTC+02:00 (CEST)
- Postal code: 23290
- ^{1} French Land Register data, which excludes lakes, ponds, glaciers > 1 km^{2} (0.386 sq mi or 247 acres) and river estuaries.

Saint-Pierre-de-Fursac (French pronunciation: [sɛ̃ pjɛʁ də fyʁsak]; Limousin: Furçac (Sent Peir)) is a former commune in the Creuse department in central France. On 1 January 2017, it was merged into the new commune Fursac.

The Château de Chabannes was an orphanage in the village of Chabannes (part of today's Saint-Pierre-de-Fursac) in Vichy France where about 400 Jewish refugee children were saved from the Holocaust by the efforts of its director, Félix Chevrier and other teachers.

== Geography ==
The river Semme forms part of the commune's northeastern border, flows west through the commune, then forms part of the commune's northwestern border.

== Population ==
Historical population
Year	Pop.	±% p.a.
1962	1,058	—
1968	1,019	−0.62%
1975	872	−2.20%
1982	887	+0.24%
1990	805	−1.21%
1999	787	−0.25%
2018	748	−0.27%
Source: EHESS and INSEE

== See also ==
- Communes of the Creuse department
