= Œuvre de secours aux enfants =

French Jewish humanitarian organization

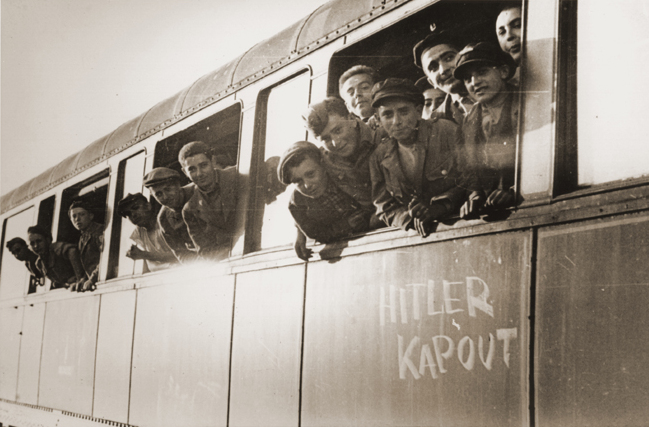
Jewish youth liberated at Buchenwald lean out the windows of a train, as it pulls away from the station. The train, which has been marked with the phrase "Hitler kaput" ("Hitler is finished" in several European languages), will transport the children to an OSE home in Ecouis, France.

Œuvre de secours aux enfants (French: [œvʁ də səkuʁ oz‿ɑ̃fɑ̃], English: Children's Aid Society), abbreviated OSE, is a French Jewish humanitarian organization which was founded in Russia in 1912 to help Russian Jewish children. Later it moved to France.

OSE's most important activities took place both before and during World War II. OSE assisted mainly Jewish refugee children, both from France and from other Western European countries. OSE rescued children from extermination by Nazi Germany. It also operated after World War II.

During the most important period of its work, immediately after the German defeat of France in 1940, OSE operated mainly in unoccupied southern France, controlled by the pro-German Vichy France government. However, many children helped by OSE were from the Netherlands, Belgium, Luxembourg, and German-occupied northern France. These children had reached the Vichy zone, usually under very difficult travel conditions, and sometimes with the direct danger that they could be captured by the occupying Germans.

OSE was founded in 1912 by doctors in Saint Petersburg, Russia, as Obshchetsvo Zdravookhraneniya Yevreyiev ("Organization for the health protection of Jews"; OZE), to help needy members of the Jewish population. Branches were established in other countries. In 1923 the organization relocated to Berlin, under the symbolic presidency of Albert Einstein.

In 1933, fleeing Nazism, it relocated again, this time to France where it became the Œuvre de secours aux enfants ("Society for Rescuing Children"), retaining a similar acronym.

In France, the OSE ran Children's Homes (often called "Châteaux," but actually large "mansions," and see listing below). These Homes were for Jewish children of various ages, including infants, whose parents were either in Nazi concentration camps or had been killed.

In March 1939, several transports brought German Jewish children to France. Other children arrived either on their own or were brought by relatives. By May 1939, the OSE Children's Homes held more than 200 refugee children.

The children were schooled and trained according to their age. To prepare children for possible future dangers, the OSE teachers paid special attention to physical education and survival skills.

A 1999 documentary The Children of Chabannes by filmmakers Lisa Gossels and Dean Wetherell is about one such home, Château de Chabannes, in the small village of Chabannes, where 400 Jewish children were saved from the Holocaust.

In June–September 1941, Andrée Salomon supervised three transports which brought about 350 children from the OSE homes through Marseille and to the United States. They were then sponsored by the United States Committee for the Care of European Children, The German-Jewish Children's Aid (later European-Jewish Children's Aid), and assisted by the American Friends Service Committee (Quakers) in Marseilles. Nearly all of those parents were later murdered by the Nazis.

In 1942, the police began round-ups and deportations from the orphanages to Nazi concentration and extermination camps, and the OSE organized an underground network in order to smuggle the children to neutral countries. Some children were saved by French rescuers, and some joined the French resistance.

In the summer of 1961, David Littman organized the clandestine migration of 530 Moroccan children to Israel with the help of the OSE in Operation Mural, an operation led by the Mossad.

== During World War II ==
The rescue of Jewish children in France by the OSE, also its aid to adults:

=== First Period of the War ===
With the declaration of war in September 1939, the OSE program took on another dimension. It became necessary for OSE to shelter children from Germany and Austria who had become "enemy aliens."

After the German blitzkrieg into France in May 1940, OSE now also had to organize the evacuation of children from the Paris area to protect them from bombing. OSE had to accommodate the flood of refugees. Also OSE had to rethink its social action depending on the political situation in the country.

Children were installed in the Chateaux-Mansions in the Departments of Creuse and Haute-Vienne in the villages of Chabannes, Chaumont, and Masgelier and Montintin.

=== OSE develops residential-educational facilities ===
Of the temporary shelters that existed at the beginning of the war, 14 chateaux-mansions, whether lay or religious, became places where instruction was given in school-subjects, vocational education together with ORT ("Society for Trades and Agricultural Labor,") and in leisure and in sports. Georges Loinger formed a team of instructors, and organized sports competitions within the houses and between houses, so as to prevent the children from living in the stress of confinement, and to prepare for the future.

=== Andrée Salomon ===
Andrée Salomon, as the OSE delegate to the Gurs and Rivesaltes Concentration Camps, in 1941 started to supervise all the preparations for the emigration of Jewish children from the camps to the U.S.A.

Under the leadership of Salomon, OSE did manage to gather together 311 such children in three large groups, many from the Gurs internment camp, and arranged for their transit to the United States, with the help of other Organizations. These children travelled by themselves directly to the United States, leaving their parents behind, who were often still in the Gurs internment camp. These children are members of that group of Holocaust Child Survivors who are "One Thousand Children." Most of their parents were later murdered by the Nazis.

Salomon also organized support for all the interned families at Gurs. To do this, she recruited "voluntary internees" who agreed to live in the camps in order to organize the practical and social life of the destitute internees.

During 1943, after the German invasion of the Southern Vichy Region of France in November 1942, Salomon participated in the Garel network, which smuggled mainly Jewish hidden children from throughout the region into Switzerland. Similarly, in 1944, she organized the evacuation of hidden children to neutral Spain.

=== March 1942: Towards a humanitarian mission of resistance ===
At the beginning of 1942, and integrated with the UGIF (General Union of Jews in France), OSE gradually shifted from philanthropic work to that in support of a mission of humanitarian resistance. At this time, some Alsatian Jews joined the OSE as new employees. This was very important, because at the end of 1942 OSE was forced to cease the employment of its foreign staff. The situation differed radically from one area to another depending on the conditions of the occupation. However, the full sense of danger and the need to disperse and hide the children only appeared after the roundup of foreign Jews during the 16 and 17 July 1942 in the northern Occupied Zone; and the similar round-up on 26 August in the Vichy southern Zone.

=== November 1942: Hunted ===
On November 11, 1942, the Germans entered the Southern Vichy Zone, and replaced the "token independent" Vichy Government. Jews started leaving the coastal Departments. OSE moved in response to this migration. OSE opened centers in Limoges, Nice, Megève, Saint-Gervais and Chambéry. At Toulouse and Pau, teams covered the surrounding Departments, often in conjunction with the EI (??). In Lyon, the capital of the Resistance, the team of Dr. Lanzenberg came to the rescue and extended its activity into Grenoble. Raids by the Gestapo in 1943 and 1944 were responsible for a large number of arrests, including that of Madeleine Dreyfus. In total, the OSE mobilized more than 25 doctors and fifty assistants.

These chateaux-mansions represented a step in the rescue strategy first implemented by OSE in 1938. OSE gathered the children together for shelter, and then spread them around to hide them; and then re-gathered them and raised them, with housing, food, clothing, education and sports. The story of the rescue of children did not end with the war.

The OSE management location, now provided by Joseph Millner and Valentine Cremer, both of French nationality, now moved to Vic-sur-Cere, which was then in the Italian Zone at Chambéry. Cremer worked with the Office of the Union-OSE, also with the independent UGIF (General Union of Jews in France), and especially with the OSE-Geneva. OSE-Geneva redistributed the money needed to finance all operations, and which came from "The Joint." (The American Jewish Joint Distribution Committee)

=== Spring-Summer 1943: The Garel clandestine network of escape routes ===
After the famous "Night of Vénissieux" (near Lyon) in August 1942, during which 108 OSE children were saved from capture and deportation, Joseph Weill used Georges Garel, a French Jewish Combat Engineer, to organize a secret network of escape routes (Underground Railways) for the transport of children. Despite many difficulties, Garel completed the network, which covered four major regions of the Southern Vichy Zone (except around Nice), and it was operational by the summer of 1943. None-the-less the final closing of all the houses, however, took more than a year. Each region operated in a cell and was autonomous, under the direction of an area manager.

From Lyon, Georges Garel coordinated everything, organized the technical infrastructure (false papers, hiding-places, convoys), and managed connections with all the relevant co-workers. Constantly moving, it took political decisions, visits in the regions, and bringing money to overcome arrests. Families, convents and boarding schools were prepared and made ready for the OSE children, whose identity-papers had been falsified, and who had had their ties with their parents cut. This was done through personal contacts with Monsignor Saliège, the Archbishop of Toulouse, and also assistants in both the Jewish and non-Jewish networks.

=== 1943-1944: The smuggling of children into Switzerland ===
The smuggling of OSE children into Switzerland started in April 1943, following negotiations with the Swiss authorities for the arrival of unaccompanied children. Several smugglers working directly under the OSE were assigned for this purpose. Jenny Masour together with Robert Job and the heads of OSE houses chose particularly vulnerable children. These children were sent to new homes in the Italian zone, Moutiers-Salins and Saint Paul in the Chablais; or in groups of 6 to 10 to Switzerland. In August 1943, the number of smuggling parties was increased from the evacuation residence centers in Saint-Gervais and Megeve.

In September 1943, with the push of the Germans into the Italian zone, the task became more difficult. The organization of the smuggling-parties to Switzerland was now entrusted to Georges Loinger. After successive arrests from November 1943 to March 1944, the smuggling of children almost came to a stop. In March 1944 they resume at an accelerated rate, carried out jointly by the OSE, the Sixth (the clandestine circuit EIF) and the Zionist youth Movement (MJS).

=== February 1944: Going into hiding ===
The arrest of Alain Mosse and all the officers of the OSE-UGIF in Chambéry required the organization to go into total hiding. OSE decided to close the last chateaux/houses for the children, and also all its centers and offices. OSE management continued to work through periodic meetings in Lyon, at Rene Borel, or in immobilized train carriages. The arrested were deported to Auschwitz, where they died.

== OSE's Work after 1944 ==
After France was liberated in 1944, OSE's work continued. It had to disperse the OSE children under its care. Children were sent to homes in France or to other countries, including Palestine and the United States.

Moshe Prywes from 1947 to 1951 was director of the OSE Jewish Health Organization in Paris.

Samuel-Daniel Levy, with the collaboration of a group of Jewish doctors, established a Moroccan branch of the OSE in 1945.

In the summer of 1961, David Littman organized the clandestine migration of 530 Moroccan children to Israel with the help of the OSE in Operation Mural, an operation led by the Mossad.

== List of OSE Children's Homes in France during World War II ==
Sources:

- Château de Quincy
- Château du Masgelier
- Château de Chabannes
- Château de Chaumont (Creuse)
- Le Couret, La Jonchère
- Villa La Chesnaie, Eaubonne
- Villa Helvetia, Montmorency
- Château de la Hille, Montégut-Plantaurel
- Château de la Mille
- Mas-Jambot
- Château Maubuisson
- Château de Montintin, Chateau-Chervix
- Château Montpellier
- Château des Morelles at Broût-Vernet
- Les Tourelles

== See also ==
- Germaine Ribière
- Fanny's Journey
- Kindertransport
