= Georges Garel =

WWII French Resistance fighter

- Born: Grigori Garfinkel; 1 March 1909; Vilna, Russian Empire
- Died: 9 January 1979 (aged 69); Paris, France
- Other name: Gasquet
- Citizenship: French (from 1934)
- Education: ETH Zurich
- Occupations: Electrical engineer; Resistance member
- Known for: Founder of the "circuit Garel", which saved around 1,600 Jewish children during the Holocaust
- Spouse: Élise "Lili" Tager (m. 1943)
- Children: 7

Georges Garel (also known as Gasquet, born Grigori Garfinkel; 1 March 1909, Vilna – 9 January 1979, Paris) was a Frenchman of Russian Jewish extraction celebrated for his exploits with the French Resistance in World War II. He was also a senior electrical engineer working for the Compagnie Électro-Mécanique. He was a member of the group which rescued 80 adults and 108 children from deportation from a Vichy internment camp at Vénissieux in August 1942. His subsequent efforts resulted in an organisation which became known as the "circuit Garel" which would eventually rehouse some 1,600 Jewish children into places in southern France under false papers, thus saving them from deportation.

== Early life ==
Georges Garel was born in Vilna in 1909, where his father was an engineer. When he was aged 3, in 1912 the family moved to Kiev. In 1924, the year of Lenin's death, the family emigrated from the Soviet Union to Berlin, and then, two years later, in 1926 to Paris.

He obtained his two Baccalauréats in Paris, in 'Lettres' and Sciences, but took his degree studies at the École Polytechnique, Zürich, studying in German. With his diploma in electrical engineering from the prestigious university, he joined the staff of the Compagnie Électro-Mécanique at Lyon. In 1934, he became naturalised in France.

== World War II ==
As a lieutenant in the artillery reserve forces, he was mobilised in August 1939 and saw service on the Italian front in Dauphiné. He was demobilised in 1940 and resumed his work with CEM. In a boarding house where he took his meals, he met Abbé Alexandre Glasberg, Nina Gourfinkel, and Raymond Winter, all engaged in clandestine actions. Abbé Glasberg and Charles Lederman, representative of the Œuvre de secours aux enfants (OSE) in the southern zone, introduced him into the fort de Vénissieux, which had been transformed into a camp to gather the 1,200 foreign Jews arrested on 26 August 1942 and destined for deportation.

In 1942, with his future brother-in-law Charles Lederman and Abbé Alexandre Glasberg, he helped those who had been imprisoned in Vénissieux under Pétain’s “Status of the Jews”. During the summer of 1942, the round-ups conducted in the Lyon region brought one thousand two hundred people deemed to be of Jewish race to Vénissieux. On August 23, 1942, Georges Garel was part of the commission to "screen" these twelve hundred racial prisoners. The operation was staffed by the OSE, which acted as an alternate to the prison and police. The commission succeeded in excluding eighty adults and one hundred and eight children from deportation.

On 11 November 1942, the "free zone" was abolished and came under German military administration. The following month, Joseph Weill, medical director of the OSE who was forced to subordinate himself to the Union générale des israélites de France (UGIF, General Organization of Jews in France) and saw several of its shelters serve as targets for the raids, asked Georges Garel to set up an underground network to hide children under the age of sixteen under false identities and disperse them among the population and then if possible have them cross the Swiss border. The network was at the heart of the clandestine form of the OSE and brought together all the services necessary for the task, illegal printers, liaison officers, landlords ... It would only take official form after the war by becoming the Association of the Jewish resistance in France (AJRF). Georges Garel obtained from Cardinal Jules Saliège, Archbishop of Toulouse (who read in the pulpit "The Jews are men [...] Not everything is allowed against them [...]") the authorization to place children, with false papers, in ecclesiastical institutions of the diocese of Toulouse.

The "circuit Garel" was set up in January 1943. Support came from other Catholic organizations, then Protestant, secular, and even private initiatives. About 1,600 children would eventually be placed in the south of France and the former Italian zone, around Toulouse and Lyon, but also Valence and Limoges. Georges Garel's role was to keep contact with these scattered children, provide for their maintenance, and develop the network in what was the southern zone. Garel married Lili Tager in 1943 in Lyon, and the couple went on to have seven children. The circuit operated until the autumn of 1944.

== Later life ==
After the Liberation of France, Georges Garel was appointed directeur general of Œuvre de secours aux enfants (OSE) France. In 1948 he resumed his post as engineer at CEM. In 1951, he was appointed president of OSE. He retired in 1974, but continued as president until 1978, while continuing to serve regularly on the association's board of directors. He died in Paris of a heart attack, aged 69.

== Personal life ==
Garel married Élise "Lili" Tager who had been a colleague in the resistance. She was born in Paris in 1921 to Russian Jewish parents who had emigrated to France in 1919. She took part in the demonstration of 11 November 1940 by school and university students, at the Place de l'Étoile, and was imprisoned as a Jew for three months at Fresnes. She fled to Lyon, in the southern zone, at the end of 1941. She joined the Résistance as a courrier providing liaison between Nice and Lyon. She was involved in saving Jewish children, with her husband, Georges Garel. Her résistance name was Élisabeth-Jeanne Tissier. She was imprisoned for a while at fort Montluc, Lyon.

The Garels had seven children: Jean-Renaud, lecturer and biochemist; Anne, a doctor; Michel, conservator of Hebrew manuscripts at the Bibliothèque Nationale de France; Laurent, a doctor; Thomas, normalien and physician; Denis, a doctor; and Nathalie, communications advisor.

== Book ==
- Georges Garel, Le sauvetage des enfants par l'OSE, 1938–1944., Coll. Témoignages de la Shoah, (tr. "The OSE saving children, 1938-1944, collection of testimonies to the Shoah) vol. 14676 (ISSN 1778-3259), Éditions Le Manuscrit, 2012 ISBN 9782304040463.
