= Mark R. Cohen =

American historian

- Born: March 11, 1943 (age 83); United States
- Occupations: Scholar, professor, author

Academic background
- Education: Brandeis University; Jewish Theological Seminary; Columbia University
- Website: https://nes.princeton.edu/people/mark-cohen

Mark R. Cohen (born March 11, 1943) is an American scholar of Jewish history in the Muslim world.

Cohen is Khedouri A. Zilkha Professor Emeritus of Jewish Civilization in the Near East and Professor Emeritus of Near Eastern Studies at Princeton University. He is a scholar of the history of Jews in the Middle Ages under Islam. His research relies greatly on documents from the Cairo Geniza. From 1985 until his retirement in 2013, Cohen led the Princeton Geniza Lab, which aims to make the Cairo Geniza's corpus available and searchable online. As of 2023, the database contains 400,000 documents. The project was headquartered at the Shelomo Dov Goitein Geniza Research Lab, where many of Goitein's books and notes are stored, but is now separate.

== Education and work ==
Cohen earned his undergraduate degree at Brandeis University, his master's degree at Columbia University, and his doctorate at the Jewish Theological Seminary of America.

Cohen won the 1981 National Jewish Book Award in the Jewish History category for his book Jewish Self-Government in Medieval Egypt: The Origins of the Office of Head of the Jews, ca. 1065-1126. He was awarded a Guggenheim Fellowship in 1996. In 2010, he was the first winner of the Goldziher Prize, awarded by Merrimack College for scholarship promoting better understanding between Jews and Muslims.

In 2014, Cohen was a visiting professor at New York University Abu Dhabi.

== Selected publications ==
- Jewish Self-Government in Medieval Egypt: The Origins of the Office of Head of the Jews, ca. 1065-1126 (1981)
- The Autobiography of a Seventeenth-Century Venetian Rabbi (1987)
- Under Crescent and Cross: The Jews in the Middle Ages (1994)
- Poverty and Charity in the Jewish Community of Medieval Egypt (2005)
- The Voice of the Poor in the Middle Ages: An Anthology of Documents from the Cairo Geniza (2005)
