= Ole Jørgen Anfindsen =

Norwegian computer scientist and author

- Born: 18 March 1958 (age 68)
- Education: University of Oslo (PhD)
- Occupations: Writer, scientist
- Employer(s): Formerly GTE Laboratories, Sun Microsystems Laboratories, University of Oslo
- Notable work: Selvmordsparadigmet (2010)
- Relatives: Jens Tomas Anfindsen (brother)
- Website: HonestThinking

Ole Jørgen Anfindsen (born 18 March 1958) is a Norwegian computer scientist, author and social commentator.

As a social commentator, Anfindsen focuses on the issues of immigration, and race and intelligence. In relation to these topics, he is the operator of the website HonestThinking, writes opinion pieces in newspapers, and in 2010 authored the book Selvmordsparadigmet.

Anfindsen holds a doctorate in computer science from the University of Oslo. Using the research results from his doctoral thesis, he formed the company Xymphonic Systems to use the technology commercially. Later, he has been a senior research scientist at Telenor R&D, guest researcher at GTE Laboratories in Massachusetts and Sun Microsystems Laboratories in California, and adjunct associate professor at the University of Oslo.

== Professional career ==
Anfindsen obtained a PhD in computer science from the University of Oslo in 1997. His doctoral thesis, delivered at the Department of Informatics, was titled Apotram: an application-oriented transaction model. Anfindsen's research dealt with so-called xymphonic transactions in databases, a generalization of the classical transaction model. The research results later led him to form the company Xymphonic Systems to use the technology commercially. He has since been a senior research scientist at Telenor R&D, guest researcher at GTE Laboratories in Massachusetts and Sun Microsystems Laboratories in California, and adjunct associate professor at the Institute of Informatics at the University of Oslo.

== Social commentary ==
Anfindsen has been engaged in the debate about immigration, race and intelligence. In February 2005 Anfindsen started the HonestThinking blog together with his brother Jens Tomas Anfindsen, who was later a participant in the international counter-jihad conference in Brussels in 2007 and employee of Human Rights Service, where he published essays written by Fjordman, and who also holds a PhD. Jens Tomas stepped down from HonestThinking later in 2007 as he was employed by Norge Idag, where he has laid out Bat Ye'or's Eurabia conspiracy theory.

Through the website and newspaper debates, Anfindsen puts the spotlight on the Norwegian immigration and integration policies. One of the site's main issues is the forecast that ethnic Norwegians may become a minority in Norway by 2050. He has argued that the intelligence of immigrants in Norway could be critical for the future of the nation. He expressed worry over the low European birth rates, but held immigration to not be a sustainable solution. This was as it would lead to a multiethnic and racially mixed society. He argued that many scientists have pointed out that few things control a person's loyalty and preferences more than race, and that there likely are a limit to how many different languages and "loyalties" a society can contain until it breaks apart.

Anfindsen uses a model which divides humans into three main races: one originating from East Asia, one from Europe and the Middle East, and one from Africa. According to him, East Asians have the highest IQ and Africans the lowest. He claims that for instance foreign aid may have been less successful because one has not taken different IQ levels into account. He has also claimed that there are ideological motives behind the denial of the existence of different races, and that the longer one hides "the truth", the more it will eventually pave the way for racism and worse.

In 2010 Anfindsen released his book Selvmordsparadigmet – hvordan politisk korrekthet ødelegger samfunnet ("The Suicide Paradigm – how political correctness destroys society"), for which he had been awarded a grant to write by the free speech organisation Fritt Ord. According to his publishing house Koloritt Forlag, "seldom or never has such a radical criticism of society been published in Norway." Besides Anfindsen's writings, appendixes in the book have been written by Henry Harpending, Frank Salter, Roger Scruton and Fjordman.

Since 2015, Anfindsen has opened up about his process towards converting from Christianity to Islam.

== Publications (selection) ==
=== Computer science ===
- The new SQL standards, Kjeller: Televerkets forskningsinstitutt, 1993.
- Application-oriented transaction management (med Mark Hornick), Kjeller: Televerkets forskningsinstitutt, 1994.
- The significance of SQL3, Kjeller: Televerkets forskningsinstitutt, 1994.
- Extended three and five value logics for reasoning in the presence of missing and unreliable information (med Dimitrios Georgakopolous og Ragnar Normann), Kjeller: Televerkets forskningsinstitutt, 1994.
- Supporting Cooperative Work in Multimedia Conferences by Means of Nested Databases, Proceedings of Norwegian Computer Science Conference—NIK '96, 1996, side 311–322.
- Cooperative Work Support in Engineering Environment by Means of Nested Databases, Proceedings of CEEDA, 1996, Poole, pp. 325–330.
- Apotram: an application-oriented transaction model, UNIK Center for Technology og Institutt for Informatikk (UiO), 1997 (2. edition).
- Java-databaser: en evaluering (w/ Asbjørn Danielsen), Kjeller: Telenor forskning og utvikling, 1999.

=== Books ===
- Selvmordsparadigmet – hvordan politisk korrekthet ødelegger samfunnet, Koloritt, 2010.
- Fundamentalistiske favntak – om islamofobi, islamisme og andre typer religiøs eller sekulær fundamentalisme, Kolofon, 2015.
