= Human Rights Service =

Norwegian foundation

- Company type: Foundation (nonprofit)
- Founded: 2001
- Headquarters: Oslo, Norway
- Key people: Rita Karlsen; Hege Storhaug
- Website: www.rights.no

Human Rights Service (HRS) is a Norwegian foundation established in 2001. The organization is known for its criticism of Islam and immigration, and is managed by Rita Karlsen and Hege Storhaug.

== Activities ==
HRS claims to have been established to work for a more well-functioning multi-ethnic society. Through the spread of information the organization aims to contribute to better integration of immigrants, and preventing violation of human rights. It has become known especially for its work against forced marriage, and against cultural and religious oppression of women. The organization has also been critical of the cultural and economic effects of the high immigration to Norway.

HRS received public funding from the Norwegian state from 2002 to 2021, and from 2012 to 2015 from Oslo municipality. After a new Oslo city council proposed to withdraw further support in 2015, the organization claimed they saw a huge surge of private donations. In 2017, after longstanding opposition from the left-wing parties, the centre-right political parties Liberal Party, Christian Democratic Party, and some politicians from Conservative Party also tried to stop further funding of HRS, but they still got NOK 1.835.000 in state funding. In September 2021, after increasing criticism and opposition to its work from several political parties, it was announced that the state would cease funding HRS.

HRS has been praised by Ayaan Hirsi Ali. American writer Bruce Bawer has formerly worked for the organization. The website of the organisation has long been considered to promote the Eurabia conspiracy theory of Bat Ye'or. Previously, since 2007, the site also published works by the counter-jihad blogger Fjordman through its former employee Jens Tomas Anfindsen who also attended the 2007 counter-jihad conference in Brussels. HRS has later distanced itself from Bat Ye'or, the Eurabia conspiracy theory and Fjordman. The organisation has however still been considered to have a counter-jihad character, though more subtle than others.

The organization has seen controversy as a result of criticism by immigrant women formerly affiliated with the organization, including former employee Amal Aden criticizing some of its alleged work methods. Aden gave a formal complaint to the police, but the police later dropped the case due to insufficient capacity.
