= Islamization conspiracy =

Islamization conspiracy may refer to:

- Eurabia: a conspiracy theory of globalist elements to Islamise and Arabise Europe.
- Counter-jihad: political movement consisting of organizations, bloggers and activists all linked by a common belief that the West is being subjected to takeover by Muslims.
