= Jael Uribe =

Dominican poet

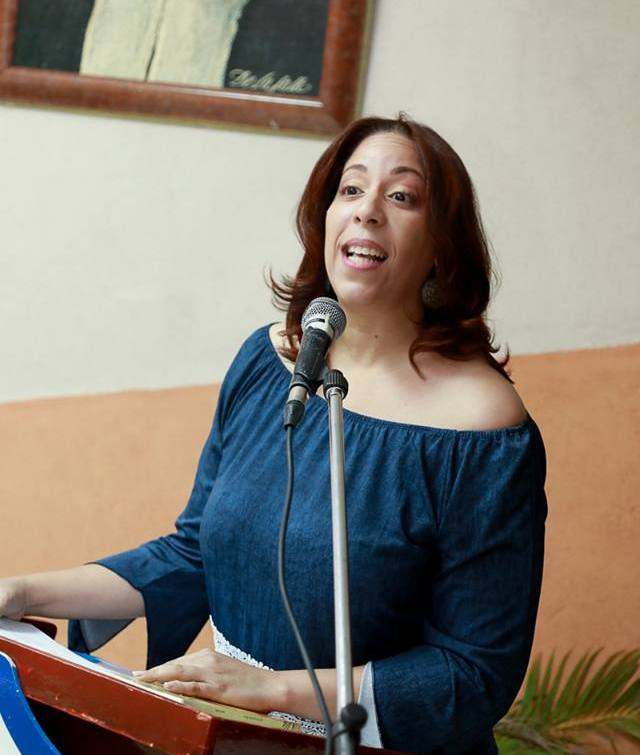
- Jael Uribe reading poetry at Santo Domingo 2017.
- Born: Jael Elizabeth Uribe Medina; February 10, 1975 (age 51); Santo Domingo, Dominican Republic
- Occupations: Publisher, CEO Women Poets International, storyteller, poet, writer, painter
- Writing career
- Genres: Poetry, Fiction
- Website: jaeluribe.blogspot.com

Jael Uribe Elizabeth Medina is best known as Jael Uribe (Santo Domingo, Dominican Republic, February 10, 1975) is a writer, storyteller, poet and painter creator of the female poetic foundation named Women Poets International. She is considered the initiator of the Woman Scream International Poetry and Arts Festival, a chain of events celebrated by poets, artists and cultural associations worldwide, to honor women and against women violence during the month of march.

== Biography ==
Born in Santo Domingo, graduated as a Publisher at the Universidad Autónoma de Santo Domingo (UASD ). She writes poetry and fiction since her early years and has dedicated her time to the development of cultural projects that promote female contemporary poetry internationally. Among her projects there are poetry contests for women, international event callings, poetry anthologies, poetry recitals, etc. All proposals involve women and focuses on non-violence issues. Her most notable work was the creation of Woman Scream International Poetry Festival that serves as a launching platform for both, known and novice female poets and their support in promoting them towards a greater international poetry career.

Since 2009, she has been part of various cultural events, national and international publications, and supported women causes. Among the major projects she has participated in, are included the National Writing Project in New Hampshire at Plymouth University in 2012, the Children Literature's Institute in Connecticut, USA, 2006.

=== Awards and recognition ===
In 2018 she was nominated International Beat Poet Laureate (2018–2019) in Connecticut USA, by Free Poets Collective, Founded by Colin Haskins. The same year, she appeared in Forbes LATAM magazine as one of "Los más creativos de Latinoamérica" (the most creative people in Latinamerica) and was featured by Fierce by Mitú magazine, as one of the Dominican female authors you need to read. In 2017 she received in Norway the “Freedom of Expression Award 2016” (Ytringsfrihetsprisen) by the Norwegian Author's Union in Oslo. In 2016 she won International Poetry Award Vicente Rodríguez-Nietzsche celebrated by the Porto Rico International Poetry Festival. In 2015 she was nominated “Women Of The Year” by the Dominican newspaper El Diario Libre, for her cultural work in 2014. In 2013 she received the award for her life essay in the Competition Mujeres: Voces, Imágenes y Testimonios de Voces Nuestras in Costa Rica. In 2012 she received a plaque from the Direction of the XV International Book Fair of Santo Domingo. In 2012 she got recognition for the cultural management of Women Poets International by Ediciones Limaclara, Argentina, 2012. In 2012 she wins a mention at the Diablos Azules poetry competition in Trujillo, Peru. In 2011 she wins another mention in the Caños Dorados International Poetry competition in Córdoba, Spain. In 2012 she received a mention in the Nano Expressiones Project in Venezuela, 2010. In 2010, she received a first prize for a children story at the Children's Literature Contest ELIEC in Argentina, 2010.

She has created cultural events to help poets and artist be known internationally through Woman Scream International Poetry Festival, and other activities. Her work has unified literary groups, public and private institutions such as Amnesty International (Malaga), among others, to promote the cause of non-violence. As president of the Women Poets International Foundation MPI Inc., she has coordinated events in the Dominican Republic, Mexico, Spain, United States, Colombia, Argentina, among other places in Latin America, Europe, Asia, and Africa and Germany. The festival has been featured on book fairs, ministries, and other institutions in several countries.

=== Books and publications ===
She is the author of the poetry book “De la Muerte al Fénix” (From death to phoenix), that compiles her poetry up to the year 2014 published by the Ministry of Culture in DR and the Direction of the Santo Domingo Book Fair in December 2016.

She was the editor and compiler of the anthologies: "Woman Scream", "¡Somos el GRITO!" (Both in celebration of the 10th anniversary of Woman Scream cause), “Yo Soy Mujer", “Grito de Mujer”, "Muñecas", "Faros de Esperanza" (Flashlights of hope), where many women poets participated. She has been published in several international anthologies. Among them the "Short and Twisted" anthology (Australia) 2013, “Antología de Sonetos Siglo XXI (Dominican Republic) 2013, “Anónimos 2.0”, anthology of the International Poetry Festival of Cosmopoética (Córdoba-Spain) 2012, “Mil Poemas a Miguel Hernández (España) 2012 and “Mil poemas a Pablo Neruda (Chile) 2011, “Mil Poemas a Cesar Vallejo (Perú) 2011, “Antología Poetas de la Era ”(Volume 1) 2011, “La palabra Revelada/Revelada: El poder de contarnos " (USA, NY) 2011, “Anthology of the nano-poemas at Proyecto Expresiones" (Venezuela) 2010, “Antología Canto de sirenas (México) 2010; “Antología En Audio 7 Mujeres Una Voz", of the Círculo de Escritoras Dominicanas 2010, “Antología Internacional de Poesía Amorosa "(México, Perú, Ecuador) 2006.

== See also ==
- Women Poets International
