= Øyvind Strømmen =

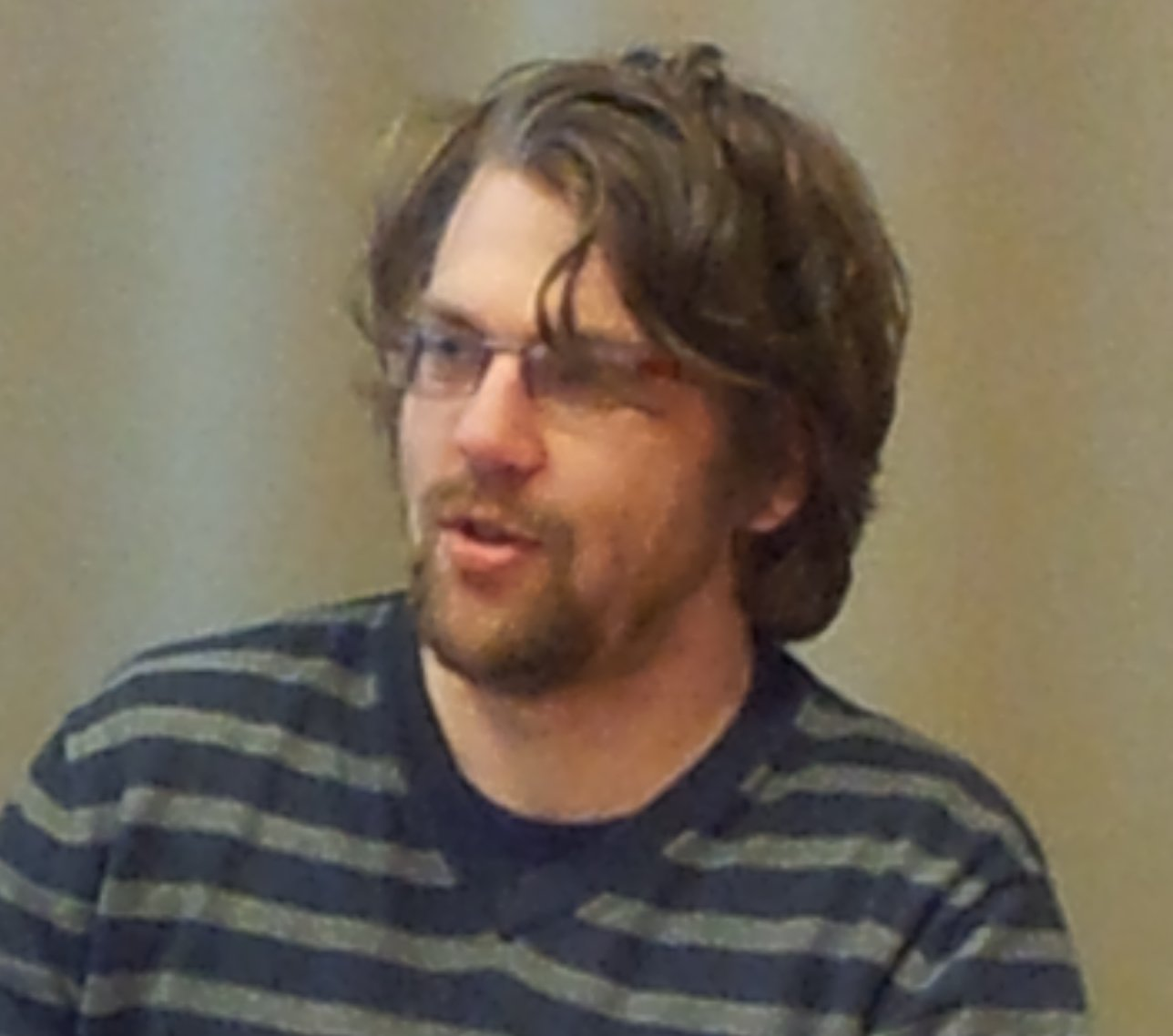
Øyvind Strømmen at a panel discussion in 2012

Øyvind Strømmen is a Norwegian author, translator and freelance journalist. He is known for his books on rightwing extremism and many contributions in Norwegian social- and mainstream media.

After the dual terrorist attacks in Norway on 22 July 2011, his insights and his book have been used in mainstream media to explain the violent potential in some of the ideologies and conspiracy theories utilized by the far-right, anti-Islamic groups in Europe. His 2011 book Det mørke nettet (the dark network) was praised by a reviewer for NRK as "an important contribution to understanding radical right movements, ideologies and actors in Norway and in Europe".

Strømmen was named Freelance Journalist of the Year in Norway in 2011 by the freelance journalists in the Norwegian Union of Journalists.

Strømmen is politically active in the Green Party.

== Books ==
- Eurofascism, 2008, Lulu.com ISBN 978-1-4303-1356-4 (English)
- Det mørke nettet. om høyreekstremisme, kontrajihadisme og terror i Europa, 2011, Cappelen Damm, ISBN 978-82-02-37027-5 (Norwegian Bokmål)
- Den sorte tråden. Europeisk høyreradikalisme fra 1920 til i dag, Cappelen Damm, ISBN 9788202370282 (Norwegian Bokmål)

=== As co-author ===
- Sigve Indregaard (editor): Motgift. Akademisk respons på den nye høyreekstremismen. Flamme and Manifest Forlag. ISBN 9788202381707(Norwegian Bokmål)

== See also ==
- Eurabia
- Fjordman
