= Euro-Arab Dialogue =

1973–1979 diplomatic dialogue between Arab League and European Economic Community

The Euro-Arab dialogue was a talking shop between the European Economic Community and the Arab League from 1973 to 1979, following the Yom Kippur War and the first oil shock.

The Euro-Arab dialogue is a central part of Bat Ye'or's Eurabia conspiracy theory.

== See also ==
- Euromediterranean Partnership
- Union for the Mediterranean

== Literature ==
- Benchenane, Mustapha (1983). Pour un dialogue euro-arabe. Paris: Berger-Levrault.
- Bourrinet, Jacques (dir.) (1979). Le dialogue euro-arabe. Paris: Economica.
- Dajani, Ahmed. Dialogue euro-arabe, point de vue arabe, (in Arab). Le Caire : Maktaba Anglo-égyptienne, 1976.
- Khader, Bichara. L'Europe et le monde arabe: Cousins, voisins. Paris : Publisud, 1992.
- Saint-Prot, Charles (dir.). Le dialogue euro-arabe. Paris : Revue d’études des relations internationales, n°34, été 1981.
- Saint-Prot Charles et El TIBI Zeina (dir.). Quelle union pour quelle Méditerranée ? Contributions de Mustapha Cherif, Emmanuel Dupuy, Henri Guaino, Bichara Khader, Jawad Kerdoudi, Alain Leroy, Antoine-Tristan Mocilnikar, Hatem M’rad, Pierre Pascallon, Gilles Pennequin, Salah Stétié. Paris : Observatoire d'études géopolitiques, Études géopolitiques 9- Karthala, 2008.
