= Free Poets Collective =

Free poets Collective, started in Connecticut, United States in 2010, as a platform for national and international poets who didn't belong to any formal poetry group, but that freely wanted to share their poetry and arts related talent through international calls and special venues. They have created several international programs, calls and events thought the years, reaching the recognition and support of many important cultural institutions.

== Projects and events ==
Free Poets Collective has hosted the Spoken Word Series, created programs such as: One Soldier One Poem ( for Connecticut's passed War Veterans), World Language Night and Poetry, the Legends of Poetry and brought to CT the Woman Scream International Poetry Festival in honor of women and against women abuse. Also collaborated with: The Mark Twain House and Museum, The Harriett Beecher Stowe House and Center, The Charter Oak Cultural Center, The Webb Dean Stevens Museum, The New Britain Museum of American Art, The Buttonwood Tree Performing Arts & Cultural Center, Artist Tree Tea House, Gallery 53, City Steam Brewery, libraries in South Windsor, West Hartford, Ellington, Middletown, Farmington, Cheshire, Meriden and Durham, The Meriden Humane Society, The Queenie Foundation, The National Theater of the Deaf, and The American School for the Deaf, The American Red Cross ( New Britain), among others.

In Connecticut, Free Poets Collective has hosted many ongoing Spoken Word Series and international poetry festivals events. Also managed many programs such as: One Soldier One Poem (honoring CT's passed War Veterans), World Language Night, and Pawetry, a fundraiser to assist animal shelters, The Legends of Poetry, among others.

Free Poets Collective has hosted and created many programs such as: Pawetry, for animal shelters fundraising.

== See also ==
- Colin Haskins
