= Erik Rudeng =

- Born: 7 February 1946 (age 80)
- Occupations: Historian, administrator, essayist and biographer

Erik Rudeng (born 7 February 1946) is a Norwegian historian, administrator, essayist and biographer. He was born in Oslo. He worked for the publishing house Universitetsforlaget from 1981 to 1985. He was director of the Norwegian Museum of Cultural History from 1990 to 2000, and director of the institution Fritt Ord from 2001. Among his books are biographies of Johan Throne Holst and William Martin Nygaard.
