= Marc Cogen =

Marc Cogen (born 1955) is a Belgian jurist en Professor of International Law.

== Career ==
Cogen began his career as a lawyer at the Antwerp bar in 1978, and started his academic career at Ghent University in 1982. He also taught at the Free University of Amsterdam and the Vrije Universiteit Brussel for periods. He was consultant for the finance and investment sector of the Southern African Development Community from 1993 tot 2000. In 1998 he was appointed Special Envoy of the Belgian Minister of Foreign Affairs (Louis Michel) for DR Congo. From 2004 to 2007 he was an advisor to Minister of Foreign Affairs Karel De Gucht.

He ran for rector elections in 2009 at the University of Ghent.

He is a co-founder and member of the board of directors of the European Friends of Israel, and sits on the board of directors of the Jewish nature movement "Keren Kayemeth Le Israel", which organises tree planting campaigns in Israel. In 2007, he participated in the international counter-jihad conference in the European Parliament. In June 2007 he was a speaker at the international conference "The Collapse of Europe?" which was held at Pepperdine University in Malibu, California, organized by the American Freedom Alliance and the Council for Democracy and Tolerance. His contribution discussed a series of political crises in Europe caused by the challenges to Western civilization due to mass migration and the side-effects of Islamization.

=== Ghent University controversy ===
In 2010, he was preventively suspended from his position as Professor of Public International Law after leftish co-professors of his faculty of law accused him of "transgressive behaviour", attacking his political viewpoints. Shortly after, the accusations brought against him were formally dismissed as baseless.

He has made his positions on international politics public, about Israel, the United States and the Iraq War, and had previously accused the university and a number of colleagues of antisemitism.

In 2011, he was seconded to the Vrije Universiteit Brussel due to pressure by his colleagues who had offended him. He lectured there until his retirement in 2020.

Marc Cogen published numerous books and articles: Does Europe Really Want a Military Capacity?, in: Proceedings of the Conference on European Defence, Royal Military Academy, Brussels, 2002; The Comprehensive Guide to International Law, Bruges, Die Keure, 2008 (ISBN 978-90-486-0142-4); Democracies and the Shock of War - The Law as a battlefield, Farnham, Ashgate, 2012 (ISBN 978-1-4094-4363-6); An Introduction to European Intergovernmental Organizations, Farnham, Ashgate, 2015 (ISBN 978-1-4724-4570-4); Self-Examination and the Old Testament, Eugene, Wipf & Stock, 2024 (ISBN 979-8-3852-0730-5).
