= Traian Ungureanu =

Romanian journalist and politician

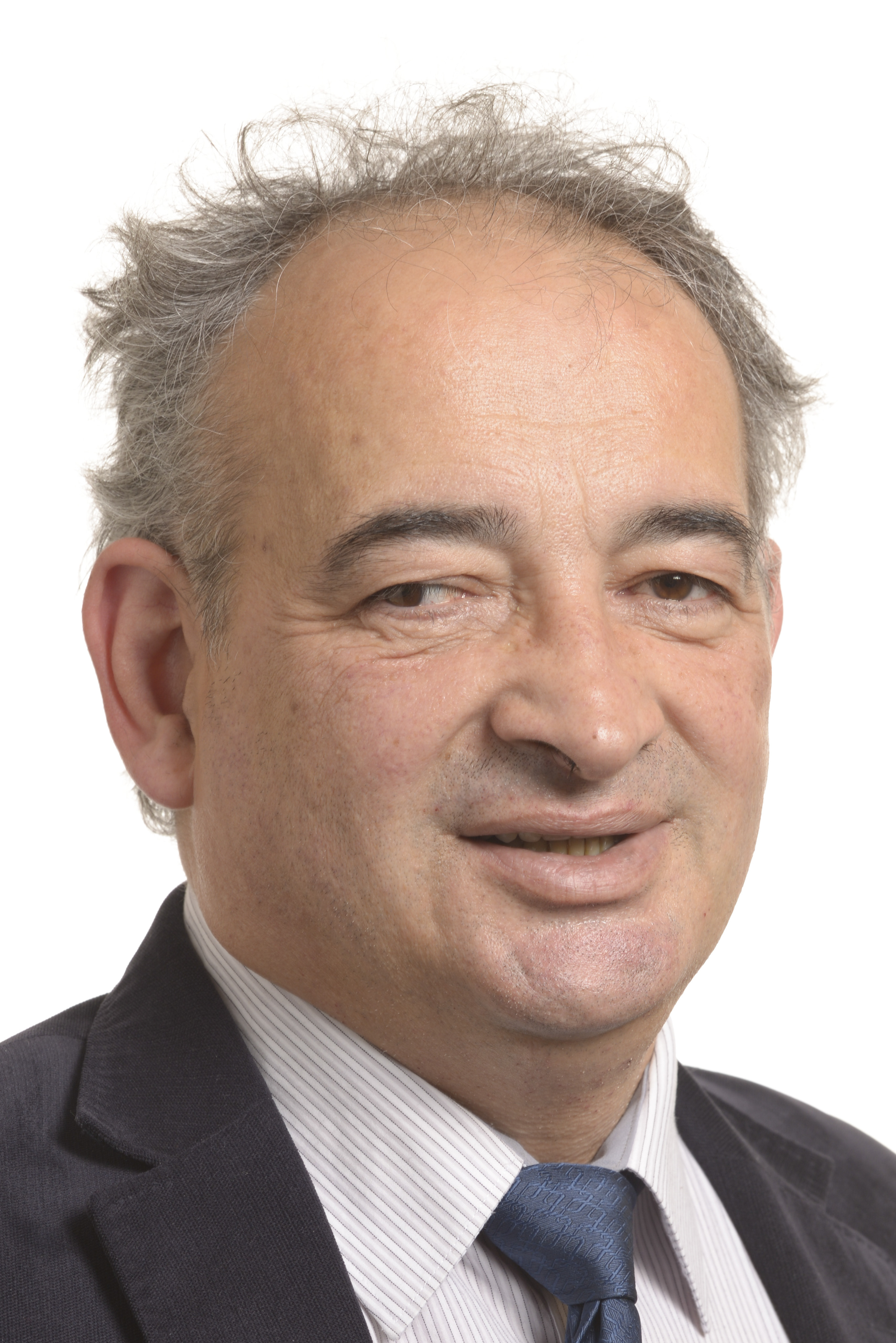

Member of the European Parliament for Romania
- In office 14 July 2009 – 1 July 2019

Personal details
- Born: 1 March 1958 (age 68) Bucharest, Romania
- Party: Democratic Liberal Party (until 2015); National Liberal Party (from 2015)
- Education: University of Bucharest (MA)
- Profession: Journalist

Traian Radu Ungureanu (born 1 March 1958) is a Romanian former journalist and politician, who was a Member of the European Parliament from 2009 to 2019.

== Life and career ==
Ungureanu was born in Bucharest and graduated from the Faculty of Philology of the University of Bucharest. He fled the Socialist Republic of Romania in 1988, settling in London.

He became a journalist at BBC World until he was dismissed in 2003 after fourteen years of service. While respected for his political analyses, he was also known for frequent criticism of the Romanian Social Democratic Party (PSD), which press colleagues believed to be linked to his dismissal. Several reporters and an editor at BBC resigned in protest against his dismissal.

He thereafter turned to politics, and was elected as a Member of the European Parliament from 2009 to 2019. He represented the Democratic Liberal Party (PDL) until it was dissolved in 2015, and the National Liberal Party (PNL) from 2015, both members of the centre-right European People's Party.

He has additionally written his own blog, and for Radio Free Europe.

== Views ==
Ungureanu has spoken out about the persecution of Christians in the Middle East and the increasing number of mosques in Europe and adaptation of Muslim demands, and he participated in the international counter-jihad conference in Brussels in 2007. He is a supporter of Donald Trump.
