= Kenneth Sikorski =

Finnish-American blogger

- Born: 1959 or 1960 (age 66–67); United States
- Occupation: Blogger
- Known for: Tundra Tabloids blog

Kenneth Sikorski (born 1959 or 1960), writing as KGS, is an American-born Finnish blogger. Sikorski has been noted as the editor of the news blog Tundra Tabloids, which has been affiliated with the pro-Israeli counter-jihad movement.

== Activities ==
Sikorski was born in the United States, where he lived until moving to Finland in 1987. A retired paper industry machinist, he formerly ran the blogs Bad News from Finland and Bad News from Sweden until 2008 as part of an international network of "bad news" bloggers, before he founded Tundra Tabloids, a pro-Israel counter-jihad blog. The website states to be "keeping tabs on the most outrageous happenings in the Middle East, Islamist extremism and Islamist hegemony in Scandinavia and on the political correctness that allows them to flourish". It has been described by The Jerusalem Post as a "media watchdog site", and a "blog that monitors anti-Israeli sentiments in the Finnish media and blogosphere".

Sikorski is based in Helsinki, and has been noted as a writer on radical Islam and antisemitism in Finland. According to scholar of antisemitism, Manfred Gerstenfeld, writing for Israel National News, without Sikorski's blog "hardly anything regarding Finnish anti-Israelism and anti-Semitism would be known abroad". Sikorski has close contacts with the blog Gates of Vienna and its editor Edward S. May, for which he has translated texts from Finnish to English, and has participated in several of the international counter-jihad conferences. He has also written for the Gatestone Institute.

In 2010, Sikorski exposed a blog post by the head of Finland's Amnesty International branch, Frank Johansson, which termed Israel a "scum state". The post was removed following the exposure, but Johansson retained his job at the organisation. In 2012, Tundra Tabloids translated a television interview with Pertti Salolainen, Finland's vice chairman of the Foreign Affairs Committee, in which Salonainen stated that American Jews "hold vast control over the wealth and media in the United States". In 2013, Sikorski gained media attention for translating a Dutch television interview with Turkish Muslim youth who praised Hitler for killing Jews.
