= Norwegian Authors Union Freedom of Expression Prize =

Annual prize for writing

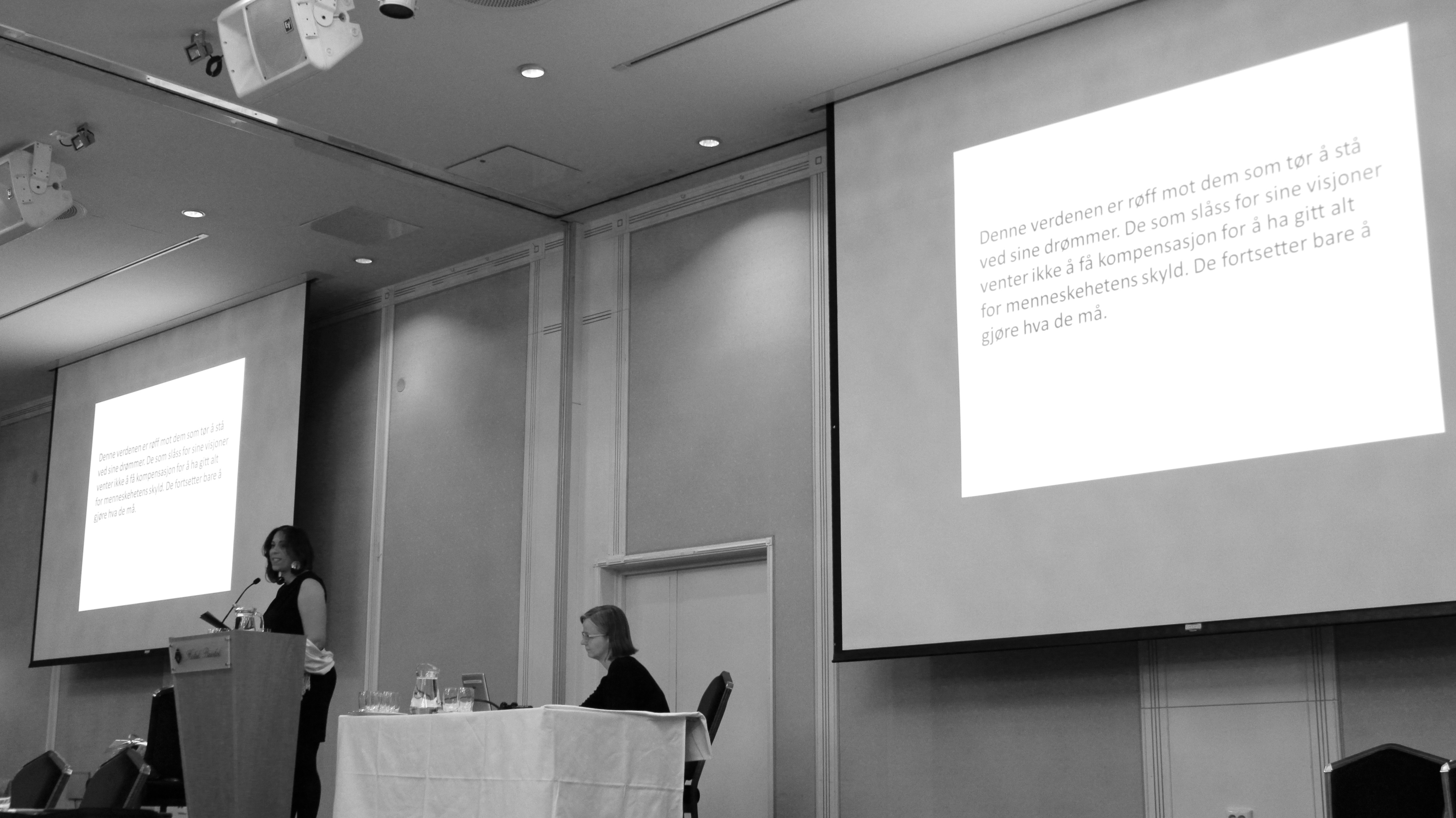
- Awarded for: Promoting freedom of expression through writing
- Sponsored by: Norwegian Authors Union
- First award: 1994
- Website: www.forfatterforeningen.no/english

The Norwegian Authors Union Freedom of Expression Award (Ytringsfrihetsprisen) is an annual prize given by the Norwegian Authors Union. It is not to be confused with the Freedom of Expression Prize of the Fritt Ord organization. The prize is awarded to a writer, journalist, author or editor who has made outstanding efforts to promote freedom of expression and tolerance in the very broadest sense. The nominations are made by an International Committee and a National Board of Members.

The Freedom of Expression Award was a gift from the Ministry of Culture to the Norwegian Authors' Union, on the occasion of the celebration of the 100th anniversary of its founding since 1993.

== Awarded ==
- 1994 Izzat Ghazzawi, Palestine
- 1995 İsmail Beşikçi, Turkey
- 1996 Joar Tranøy, Norway
- 1997 Yasar Kemal, Nigeria
- 1998 Axel Jensen, Norway
- 1999 Yehude Simon Munaro, Peru
- 2000 Željko Kopanja, Bosnia
- 2001 Amos Oz, Israel
- 2002 Anna Politkovskaya, Russia
- 2003 Pramoedya Ananta Toer, Indonesia
- 2004 Ragıp Zarakolu, Turkey
- 2005 Tsegaye Gabre-Medhin, Ethiopia
- 2006 Simin Behbahani, Iran
- 2007 Tsering Woeser, Tibet
- 2008 Normando Hernández González, Cuba
- 2009 Dawit Isaak, Eritrea
- 2010 Ma Thida, Burma
- 2011 Ales Bialiatski, Russia
- 2012 Wera Sæther, Norway
- 2013 Muharrem Erbey, Turkey
- 2014 Nguyen Xuan Nghia, Vietnam
- 2015 Prize awarded but winner wasn't published.
- 2016 Jael Uribe, Dominican Republic
- 2017 Asli Erdoğan
- 2018 Sumaya Jirde Ali
- 2019 Dareen Tatour
