= Counter-jihad =

Far-right anti-Muslim movement

Counter-jihad (also known as the counter-jihad movement) is an anti-Muslim political movement loosely consisting of authors, bloggers, think tanks, demonstrators, and other activists across the Western world. Proponents are linked by a view of Islam as an actively destructive ideology rather than a religion, arguing that it constitutes an existential threat to Western civilization. Consequently, counter-jihadists consider all Muslims as a potential threat, especially when they are already living within Western boundaries. Western Muslims accordingly are portrayed as a "fifth column", collectively seeking to destabilize Western nations' identity and values for the benefit of an international Islamic movement intent on the establishment of a caliphate in Western countries. The counter-jihad movement has been described as anti-Islamic, Islamophobic, and inciting of hatred against Muslims. Influential figures in the movement include the bloggers Pamela Geller and Robert Spencer in the US, and Geert Wilders and Tommy Robinson in Europe.

While the roots of the movement go back to the post-Iranian Revolution era, it did not gain traction until after the September 11 attacks. As far back as 2006, bloggers such as Fjordman were identified as playing a key role in forwarding the nascent counter-jihad ideology. Bat Ye'or's Eurabia conspiracy theory published in her eponymous book in 2005 also played an important factor in influencing the movement. The first official counter-jihad conferences were held in 2007. The movement received considerable attention in 2011 following the lone wolf attacks by Anders Behring Breivik, a neo-Nazi who disguised himself with a manifesto that exploited and extensively reproduced the writings of prominent counter-jihad bloggers, and following the emergence of prominent street movements such as the English Defence League (EDL) and Pegida. The movement has adherents both in Europe and in North America. The European wing is more focused on the alleged cultural threat to European traditions stemming from immigrant Muslim populations, while the American wing emphasizes an alleged external threat, essentially terrorist in nature.

According to some academics, conspiracy theories are a key component of the counter-jihad movement. The movement is also strongly pro-Israel, praising the country as a bastion of Western culture against its surrounding Muslim countries. On a day-to-day level, it seeks to generate outrage at perceived Muslim crimes.

== Overview ==
Counter-jihad is a radical right-wing movement that operates, according to Toby Archer, via the "sharing of ideas between Europeans and Americans and daily linking between blogs and websites on both sides of the Atlantic", and, according to Rasmus Fleischer, "calls for a counterjihad against the supposed Islamisation of Europe". Two central counter-jihad themes have been identified, namely that Islam and Muslim immigration poses a threat to Western civilisation, and a lack of trust in political "elites", focusing especially against the European Union. While the roots of the movement go back after the Iranian Revolution, it did not gain significant momentum until after the September 11 attacks.

The authors of Right-Wing Populism in Europe: Politics and Discourse describe the movement as heavily relying on two key tactics:

The first is arguing that the most radical Muslims – men like Osama bin Laden – are properly interpreting the Quran, while peaceful moderate Muslims either do not understand their own holy book or are strategically faking their moderation. The second key tactic is to relentlessly attack individuals and organizations that purport to represent moderate Islam...painting them as secret operatives in a grand Muslim scheme to destroy the West.

Benjamin Lee describes the "counter-jihad scene" as one where

Europe and the United States are under threat from an aggressive and politicized Islamic world that is attempting to take over Europe through a process of "Islamification" with the eventual aim of imposing Sharia law. In this process, the threat is characterized by the perceived removal of Christian or Jewish symbols, the imposition of Islamic traditions, and the creation of no-go areas for non-Muslims. The construction of mosques in particular is seen as continued reinforcement of the separation of the Muslim population from the wider populous[sic]. As strong as the threatening practices of Muslims in descriptions of the counter jihad are images of a powerless Europe in decline and sliding into decadence, unable to resist Islamic takeover. The idea that European culture in particular is in a state of decline, while a spiritually vigorous East represented by Islam is in the ascendancy in civil society, is a common sentiment in some circles.

== Counter-jihad movement ==
One of the first organizations of the counter-jihad movement (CJM), the 910 Group (later renamed to the International Civil Liberties Alliance) was founded in 2006 and announced on Gates of Vienna, "a principal blog of the CJM since 2004". Its stated purpose was to defend "liberties, human rights, and religious and political freedoms [that] are under assault from extremist groups who believe in Islamist supremacy". In April 2007, the counter-jihad current became visible as a movement operating in northwestern Europe with "The UK and Scandinavia Counterjihad Summit", organised by a transatlantic network of anti-Islam bloggers in Copenhagen, Denmark. The conference was hosted by American blogger Edward May, Danish activist Anders Gravers Pedersen, and Danish blogger Exile, and included participants such as Norwegian blogger Fjordman.

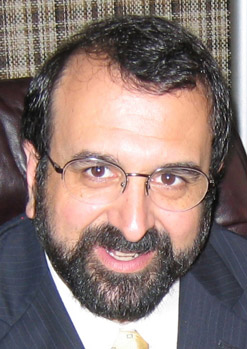
Robert Spencer, author and editor of the central counter-jihad blog Jihad Watch

In October 2007 a second summit, "Counterjihad Brussels 2007", was hosted by the Belgian Flemish-nationalist party Vlaams Belang in the European Parliament building in Brussels, Belgium. This conference has been regarded as a crucial event in the movement's history and featured speakers Bat Ye'or and David Littman followed by "country reports" from delegates Paul Beliën and Filip Dewinter (Vlaams Belang, Belgium), Stefan Herre (PI blog, Germany), Nidra Poller (Pajamas Media blog, France), Gerard Batten (UK Independence Party, UK), Ted Ekeroth (Sweden Democrats, Sweden), Lars Hedegaard (International Free Press Society, Denmark), Jens Tomas Anfindsen (HonestThinking blog, Human Rights Service, Norway), Kenneth Sikorski (Tundra Tabloids blog, Finland), Johannes Jansen (Netherlands), Adriana Bolchini Gaigher (Lisistrata blog, Italy), Traian Ungureanu (Romania), Elisabeth Sabaditsch-Wolff (Austria), Matyas Zmo (Czech Republic), with further speeches by Arieh Eldad (Moledet, Israel). Patrick Sookhdeo (Institute for the Study of Islam and Christianity, Barnabas Fund, UK), Dr Marc Cogen (Professor of International Law, Vesalius College, Belgium), Sam Solomon (Islamic Affairs Consultant, Christian Concern), Robert Spencer (Jihad Watch, David Horowitz Freedom Center), Andrew G. Bostom, and Laurent Artur du Plessis.

From 2009, the English Defence League (EDL) street movement began holding rallies with thousands of protesters. A March 2012 counter-jihad conference in Denmark drew 200–300 supporters from throughout Europe. Ten times the number of left-wing protesters staged a counter-demonstration. The 2012 conference in Denmark was claimed by its organisers, the EDL, to mark the starting point of a pan-European movement. There have been no official CJM conferences since 2013, pointing to a decline in the original movement. However, a high-point in the European street movement came in January 2015 when 25,000 people attended a Pegida rally in the German city of Dresden. In June 2018, 10,000 protesters attended a "Free Tommy" rally in London. It has been argued by Christopher Othen that, after a fallout following the 2011 Norway attacks, the movement was reinvigorated by events such as the Arab Spring, a series of Islamist terrorist attacks, and the European migrant crisis, and to have influenced the success of Donald Trump in the 2016 United States presidential election. The counter-jihad movement has also been seen to have had numerous links with the Trump administration, and to have influenced Trump's ideology. Aspects of the movement has thus been seen to have entered mainstream right-wing politics in the United States, as well as in European countries.

== Organisation ==
Blogs such as Gates of Vienna, Jihad Watch, Atlas Shrugs, Politically Incorrect, and The Brussels Journal are central to the transatlantic counter-jihad movement. Notable figures include the editors of these blogs: Edward "Ned" May (a.k.a. Baron Bodissey), Robert Spencer, Pamela Geller, Stefan Herre, and Paul Beliën, respectively. Notable other writers in the counter-jihad movement are Bat Ye'or, David Horowitz, and Fjordman.

Think tanks, such as the International Free Press Society and the David Horowitz Freedom Center, have had an important role in providing funds and establishing international links. The Center for Security Policy is also a part of the movement and operates a counter-jihad campaign. In time, a network of formal organisations has been established, with its main centres in Europe and the United States. A transatlantic umbrella organisation, Stop Islamization of Nations (SION), was established in 2012.

The International Free Press Society lists representatives from many parts of the counter-jihad spectrum on its board of advisors. Eurabia conspiracy theorist Bat Ye'or is on the board of advisors, while owner of the blog Gates of Vienna, Edward S. May, serves as outreach co-ordinator on its board of directors.

=== American counter-jihad movement ===
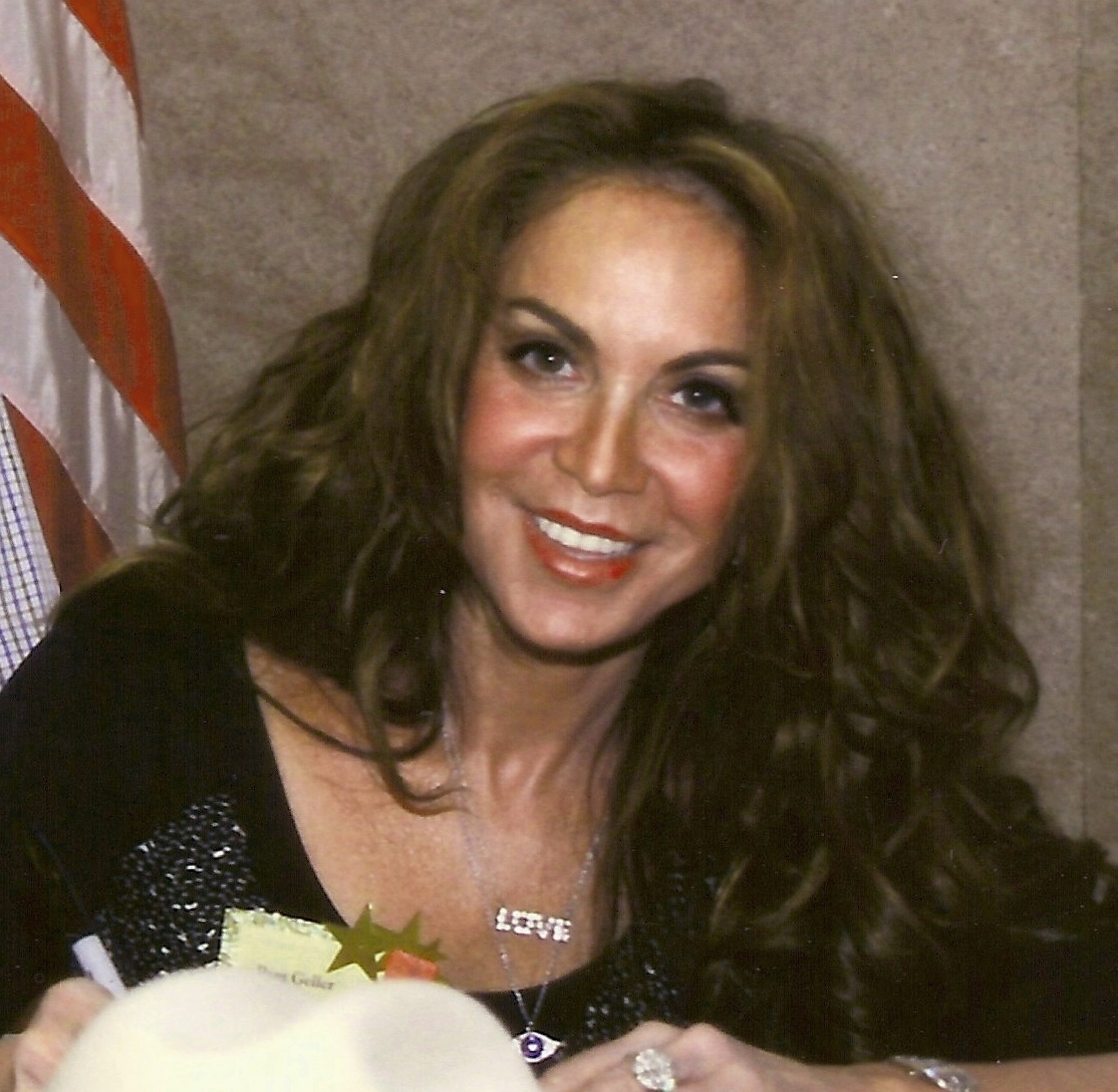
Pamela Geller, a central figure of the movement in the US

The U.S.-based Stop Islamization of America (SIOA) is led by Pamela Geller and Robert Spencer. SIOA has been accused by the Anti-Defamation League of "promot[ing] a conspiratorial anti-Muslim agenda under the guise of fighting radical Islam. The group seeks to rouse public fears by consistently vilifying the Islamic faith and asserting the existence of an Islamic conspiracy to destroy 'American' values".

In 2010, a workgroup dubbed "Team B II" published a report titled Shariah: The Threat To America, which has been cited as influencing the movement's discourse and the public's perception. The report was published by the Center for Security Policy.

With the election of Donald Trump to the United States presidency in 2016, it has been claimed that the American wing has achieved some influence in the US administration. This is focused on the influence from Frank Gaffney, President of the Center for Security Policy, and Brigitte Gabriel, President of ACT for America.

=== European counter-jihad movement ===
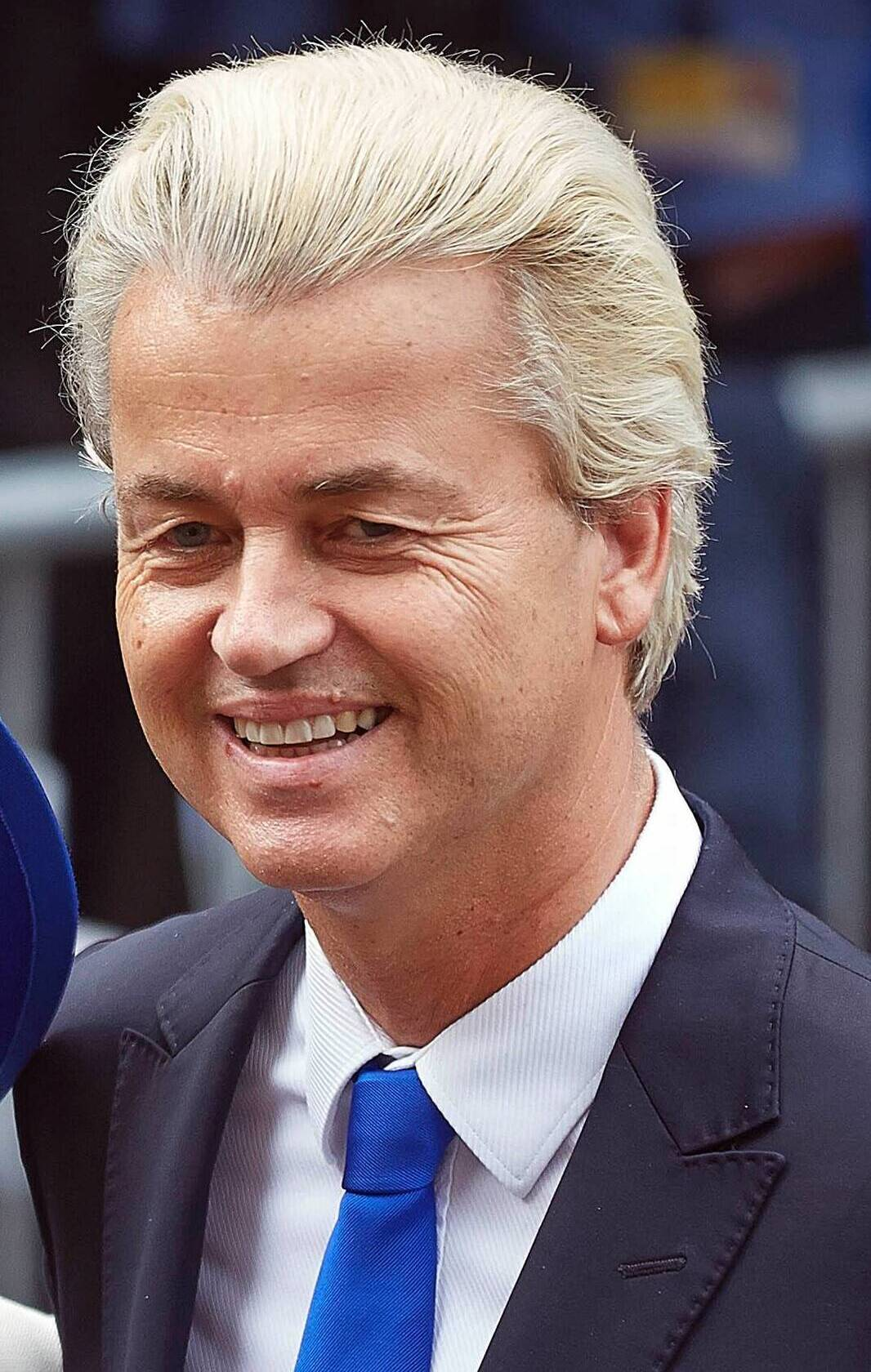
Geert Wilders, a key figure for the movement in Europe

An umbrella organization, Stop Islamisation of Europe (SIOE), was founded by Anders Gravers Pedersen, who also sits on the board of the Stop Islamisation of Nations. and there are affiliated groups in several European countries, among them Stop Islamisation of Denmark and Stop Islamisation of Norway. The English Defence League was a prominent street movement in the United Kingdom, formerly led by Tommy Robinson.

The counter-jihad movement has connections to, and has influenced the ideology of European right-wing populist parties such as the Swiss People's Party, Vlaams Belang, Sweden Democrats, Lega Nord, Alternative for Germany, National Rally of France, Freedom Party of Austria, and Hungarian Prime Minister Viktor Orban, while Dutch politician Geert Wilders is the most important figurehead for the movement.

== Counter-jihad ideology ==
In the words of Toby Archer, a scholar of political extremism and terrorism,

Counter-jihad discourse mixes valid concerns about jihad-inspired terrorism with far more complex political issues about immigration to Europe from predominantly Muslim countries. It suggests that there is a threat not just from terrorism carried out by Islamic extremists but from Islam itself. Therefore, by extension, all European Muslims are a threat.

Arun Kundnani, in a report published by the International Centre for Counter-terrorism, writes that the counter-jihad movement has evolved from earlier European far-right movements through a shift from race to values as identity markers: "In moving from neo‐Nazism to counter‐jihadism, the underlying structure of the narrative remains the same." Continuing on this note, he writes that comparing the counter-jihadist worldview to the older, neo-Nazi one, "Muslims have taken the place of blacks and multiculturalists are the new Jews."

Cas Mudde argues that various conspiracy theories with roots in Bat Ye'or's Eurabia are important to the movement. The main theme of these theories is an allegation that European leaders allow a Muslim dominance of Europe, whether by intention or not, through multicultural policies and lax immigration laws. According to Hope not Hate, counter-jihad discourse has replaced the racist discourse of right-wing, populist[ and nationalist politics in America and Europe "with the language of cultural and identity wars".

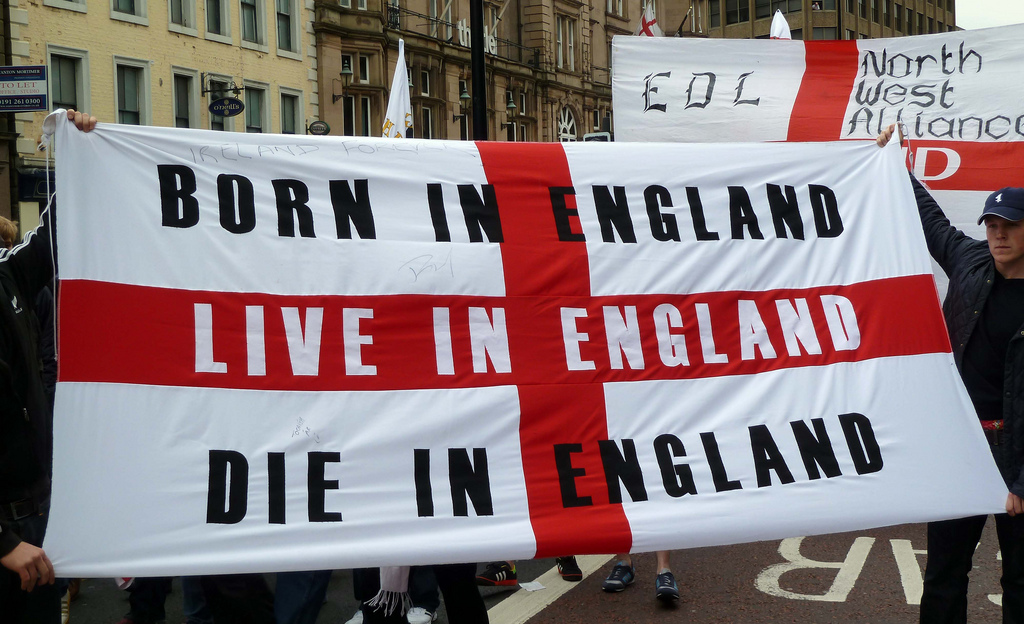
English Defence League rally in Newcastle, UK, 2010

Toby Archer detects a difference between the European and American wings of the movement. The American wing emphasizes an external threat, essentially terrorist in nature. The European wing sees a cultural threat to European traditions stemming from immigrant Muslim populations. While Archer notes that the perceived failure of multiculturalism is shared across much of the political spectrum, he argues that the counter-jihad movement is a particular conservative manifestation of this trend. He acknowledges the movement's conservative defense of human rights and the rule of law, but he believes that by rejecting progressive policy, it rejects much of what Europe is today.

The views of the counter-jihad movement have been criticised as a source of support for the anti-Muslim views of individuals inspired to take violent direct action. Anders Behring Breivik, responsible for the 2011 Norway attacks, published a manifesto explaining his views which drew heavily on the work of counter-jihad bloggers such as Fjordman. Daniel Pipes argues that a "close reading of his manifesto suggests" that Breivik wanted to discredit and undermine the movement's dedication to democratic change to further Breivik's "dreamed-for revolution" as the only alternative. Breivik has later been identified as a neo-Nazi, (Note: Sources describing Breivik as neo-Nazi include:) and has stated that he had exploited counter-jihad rhetoric in order to protect "ethno-nationalists", and instead started a media drive against what he deemed "anti-nationalist counterjihad"-supporters.

Executive director of the Institute of Race Relations, Liz Fekete, has argued that although most of the counter-jihad movement "stops short of advocating violence to achieve their goals", the most extreme parts share much of Breivik's discursive frameworks and vocabulary. She contrasts this with more mainstream counter-jihadists, who warn of Islamisation as a result of naïvety or indecisiveness, whom she identifies as a source of legitimacy for the former.

Philosopher Marius Mjaaland has described the role given to Christianity in some parts of the counter-jihad movement and has identified some aspects of the movement's ideology that he says link it to fascism-like conspiracy theories, claiming that the movement draws heavily from the Crusades.

Counter-jihad has sought to portray Western Muslims as a "fifth column", collectively seeking to destabilize Western nations' identity and values for the benefit of an international Islamic movement intent on the establishment of a caliphate in Western countries. Much of the Eurabia literature and Counter Jihad forums describe taqiyya as a manipulative strategy used by moderate Muslims to infiltrate and eventually overthrow society.

== See also ==
- Alt-lite
- Counter-terrorism
- Far-right politics
- Fortuynism
- War against Islam
- War on terror
- Forced assimilation

== Bibliography ==
- Aked, H.; Jones, M.; Miller, D. (2019). Islamophobia in Europe: How governments are enabling the far-right 'counter-jihad' movement (PDF). Public Interest Investigations (Report). University of Bristol. hdl:1983/cd525157-683a-493b-b27f-9a5ffbca312c. ISBN 9780957027497.
- Lazaridis, Gabriella; Polymeropoulou, Marilou; Tsagkroni, Vasiliki (2016). "Networks and alliances against the Islamisation of Europe: the case of the Counter-Jihad Movement". In Lazaridis, Gabriella; Campani, Giovanna (eds.). Understanding the Populist Shift: Othering in a Europe in Crisis. Taylor & Francis. doi:10.4324/9781315656779-12. ISBN 9781317326069.
- Lee, Benjamin (September 2015). "A Day in the "Swamp": Understanding Discourse in the Online Counter-Jihad Nebula" (PDF). Democracy and Security. 11 (3): 248–274. doi:10.1080/17419166.2015.1067612. S2CID 62841363.
- Meleagrou-Hitchens, A.; Brun, H. (March 2013). A Neo-Nationalist Network: The English Defence League and Europe's Counter-Jihad Movement (PDF) (Report). International Centre for the Study of Radicalisation and Political Violence.
- Othen, Christopher (2018). Soldiers of a Different God: How the Counter-Jihad Movement Created Mayhem, Murder and the Trump Presidency. Amberley. ISBN 9781445678009.
- Pertwee, Ed (October 2017). 'Green Crescent, Crimson Cross': The Transatlantic 'Counterjihad' and the New Political Theology (PDF) (Thesis). London School of Economics. doi:10.21953/lse.xx0e1p4w3f3y.
- Pertwee, Ed (2020). "Donald Trump, the anti-Muslim far right and the new conservative revolution". Ethnic and Racial Studies. 43 (16): 211–230. doi:10.1080/01419870.2020.1749688. S2CID 218843237.
