= Fritt Ord (organization) =

Norwegian private organization

The Fritt Ord Foundation
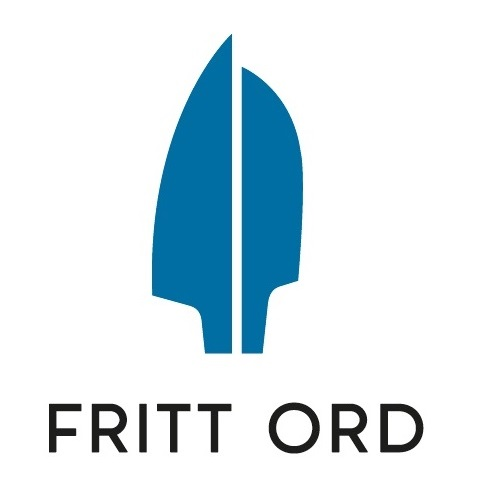
- Fritt Ord logo, new
- Company type: Foundation
- Industry: Media
- Founded: 1974
- Headquarters: Oslo, Norway
- Key people: Knut Olav Åmås (Executive Director); Grete Brochmann (Chair)
- Revenue: ▲NOK 307 million (2004)
- Net income: NOK 236 million (2004)
- Number of employees: 11 (2024)
- Website: frittord.no

Fritt Ord is a Norwegian private foundation, whose aim is to support freedom of expression and a free press. It was established on 7 June 1974 by Narvesen Kioskkompani's leaders Jens Henrik Nordlie and Finn Skedsmo as well as the lawyer Jens Christian Hauge.

Fritt Ord has significant funds and is playing a part in supporting various projects in Norway, such as investing in the newspaper Morgenbladet, supporting an encyclopedia (Store Norske Leksikon) and holding a 10.1% ownership in the media group A-Pressen. In addition it awards scholarships to students within media and journalism, awards the Fritt Ord Prize, and supports writing competitions. It has also provided funding for controversial projects, e.g. an upcoming book written by the blogger Fjordman, who calls for the deportation of all Muslims from Europe.

The organization awards three annual prizes to support freedom of speech; the Fritt Ord Award (Norwegian: Fritt Ords pris), the Fritt Ord Honorary Award (Norwegian: Fritt Ords honnør) and the Press Prizes for Russia and Eastern Europe (Norwegian: Pressepriser for Russland og Øst-Europa). Those prizes are not to be confused with "Ytringsfrihetsprisen", the annual Freedom of Expression Prize awarded mostly to international writers by the Norwegian Authors' Union. Together with the German ZEIT-Stiftung, it annually awards the Free Media Awards.

== History ==
The owners of the kiosk chain Narvesen wanted to transform his chain of newspaper and magazine retailers into an institution, and on 1 January 1975 the company was taken over by the newly created foundation Fritt Ord at the same time it merged with the Norwegian State Railways (NSB) company Norsk Spisevognselskap, who offered services within catering to the railway. Fritt Ord got 59% ownership in the newly formed company, while NSB got 41% ownership.

The dividends from the company made it possible for Fritt Ord to perform a number of tasks related to freedom of expression, including support for the Institute of Journalism and the Freedom of Expression Prize as well as a number of grants to numerous persons and institutions, domestically and internationally.

In 1995, NSB sold its shares in Narvesen and the company was listed on Oslo Stock Exchange. As a result of this Fritt Ord reduced its ownership in Narvesen to 34% in 1999 and in 2000 Narvesen was merged with Reitangruppen to form ReitanNarvesen. In 2001, Fritt Ord sold its ownership in the company to the Reitan Family. As a result of the capital freed from the sale of Narvesen, Fritt Ord has acquired holdings in Morgenbladet (30,5%) and A-Pressen (10,1%).

== Controversies ==
=== David Irving controversy in 2008 ===
The organization was criticized by some for obstructing rather than furthering freedom of speech when it threatened the Norwegian Festival of Literature with withdrawing financial support if the British Holocaust denier David Irving was allowed to speak at the festival. In October 2008 Fritt Ord's director, Erik Rudeng, demanded that its logo be removed from the webpages of the Norwegian Festival of Literature because Irving had been invited to give a lecture on his concept of truth at the festival. Irving's invitation was withdrawn only a few days later. Rudeng on his side defended the decision by stating that Fritt Ord only sponsored the literature festival in 2008 and thus it was high time their logo was removed when the program for 2009 was presented. This prompted some commentators to address the paradox of a self-proclaimed "free speech" organization which involves itself in a campaign to stop a controversial voice like that of David Irving from being heard in Norway.

=== Fjordman controversy ===
It caused controversy when it became known in 2013 that the organization provided funding to the controversial blogger Fjordman (Peder Jensen), who has been characterised as far-right and Islamophobic, for a book Jensen is writing about Anders Behring Breivik and the 2011 Norway attacks. The Labour youth party leader Eskil Pedersen said that Fritt Ord is an organization that provides a platform for "gay-haters and racists," referring to both the support for Fjordman and previous support for other controversial causes and individuals. Member of Parliament Snorre Valen accused Fritt Ord of "mockery of all those killed and injured" in the 2011 Norway attacks, stating that Fritt Ord provides funding to a writer "so that he can publish a book about the terrorist he inspired," concluding that Fritt Ord supports "extremism." Leader of the support group for Breivik's victims, Trond Henry Blattmann, told Dagbladet that Fritt Ord's financial support for Fjordman was "unacceptable." Fritt Ord's leader Georg Fredrik Rieber-Mohn said the decision to provide grants to Fjordman was very difficult. The decision was supported by Aftenposten journalist Erik Tornes who argued the grant was a cheap price to pay to get "the extremists out of the echochambers" and by Norway's Minister of Culture Hadia Tajik.
