= Women Poets International =

International women poets' non-profit organisation

Women Poets International Movement
- Mujeres Poetas Internacional MPI, inc.
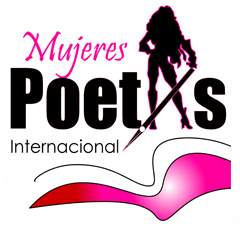
- Founded: Started at the Dominican Republic in 2009, by Mujeres Poetas Internacional MPI. Inc.
- Location: Santo Domingo, Dominican Republic
- Services: Home of the Woman Scream Festival since 2011

The Women Poets International Movement (also known as Movimiento Mujeres Poetas Internacional MPI) is an international non-profit organization operated out of the Dominican Republic. It was first launched in 2009 and focuses on the promotion of female poets and poetry through collective projects, publications and events.

== Events ==
Women Poets International is a nonprofit foundation started in November 2009 at the Dominican Republic, committed to promoting the work of contemporary female poets internationally through collective projects, and with the social responsibility of sharing messages of respect, self-esteem and nonviolence against women. This foundation holds several events throughout the year, such as the Woman Scream International Poetry Festival celebrated in march of each year, international poetry contests, and outdoor non-violence campaigns. The organization also lends assistance to various festivals, concerts, and conferences throughout the world.

=== Woman Scream Festival ===
In 2011 the organization held their first Woman Scream International Poetry and Arts Festival (Festival Internacional de Poesía y Arte Grito de Mujer) from the Dominican Republic. The festival is celebrated throughout the month of March in different countries and focuses on honoring women through multiple events. In 2011 Women Poets International expanded the focus of the event to also promote women violence awareness due to the mutilation and murder of Mexican poet Susana Chávez. In 2013 the worldwide event honored Malala Yousafzai.

The event is celebrated simultaneously in several locations around the globe such as Spain, Canada, USA, Kosovo, and other in Latin America, Asia and Europe. Many cultural events occur including conferences, workshops, talks, exhibitions, poetry and music recitals, competitions, and concerts.

== Awards ==
- Plaque from the authorities of City of Cájar Granada, Spain 2011
- Commissioner of Miami, USA 2011
- Commissioners of Union City, New Jersey USA 2012
- Lima Clara Distinction Awards, Argentina. 2012
- Plaque in the XV International Book Fair in Santo Domingo 2012
- Commissioners of Union City, New Jersey USA 2013

== Gallery ==
The events created by the MPI.

Woman Scream in the world
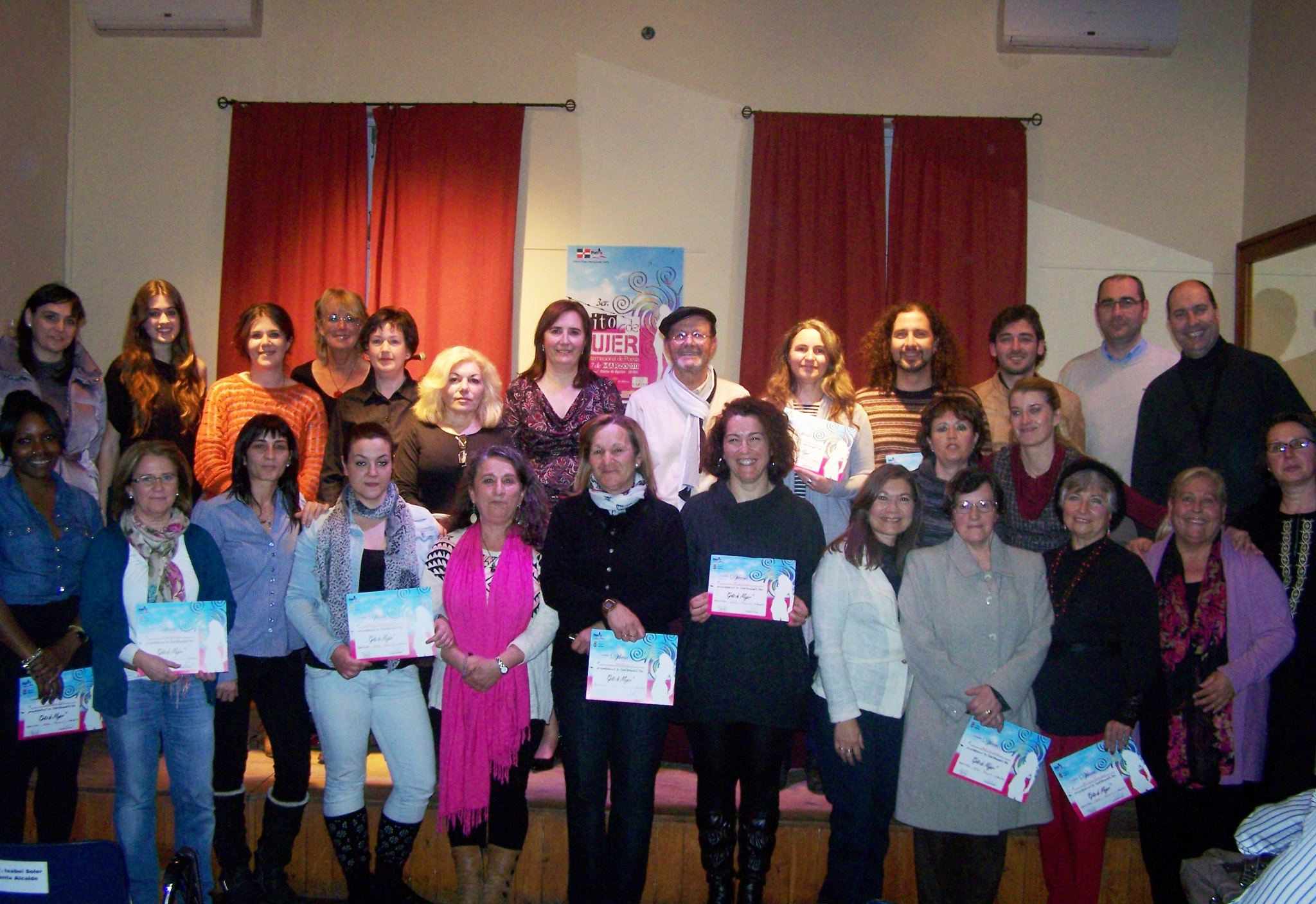
Woman Scream International Poetry Festival in Aguilas Murcia, Spain

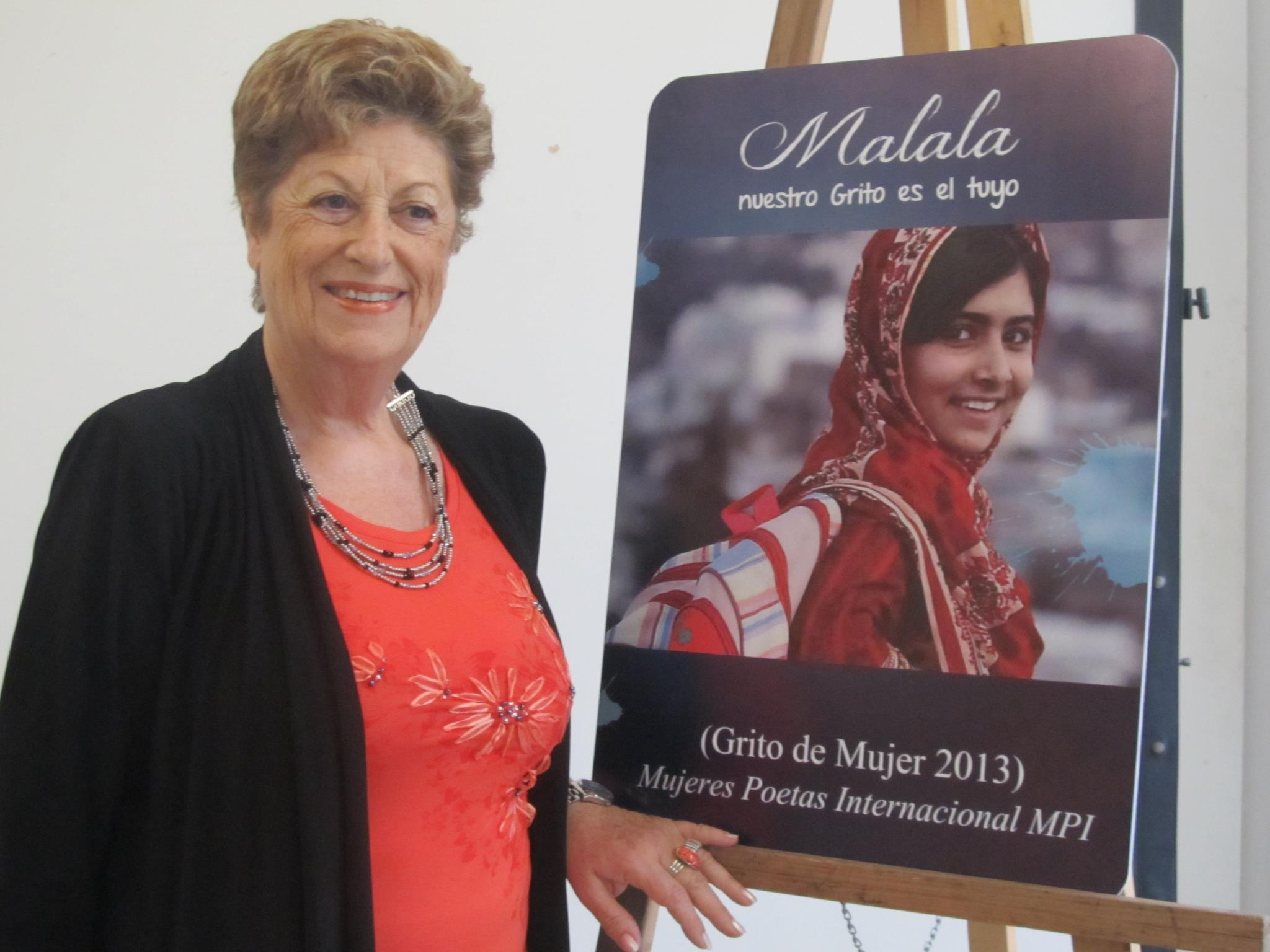
Woman Scream in Argentina in honor of Malala

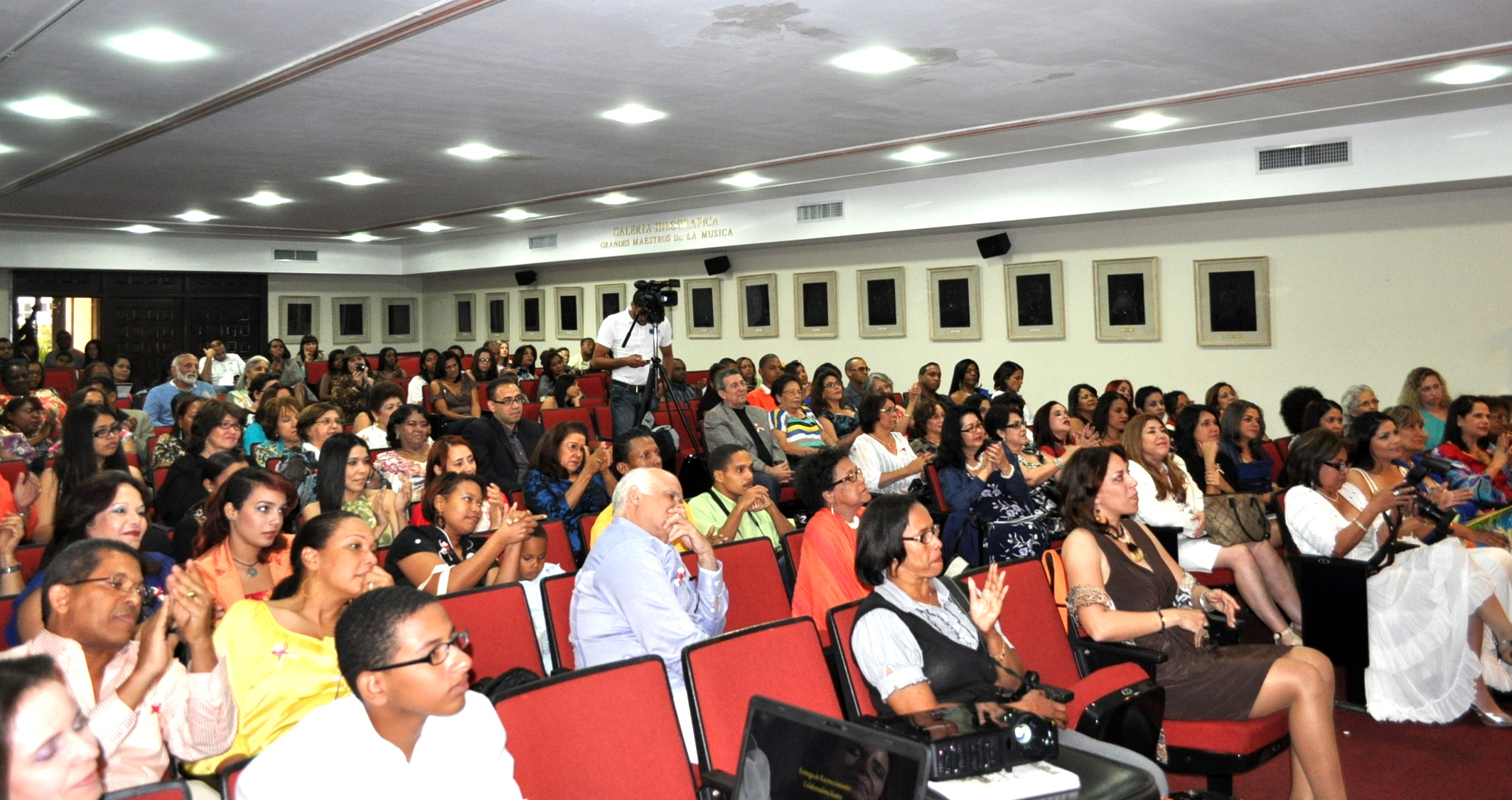
Woman Scream in Santo Domingo RD

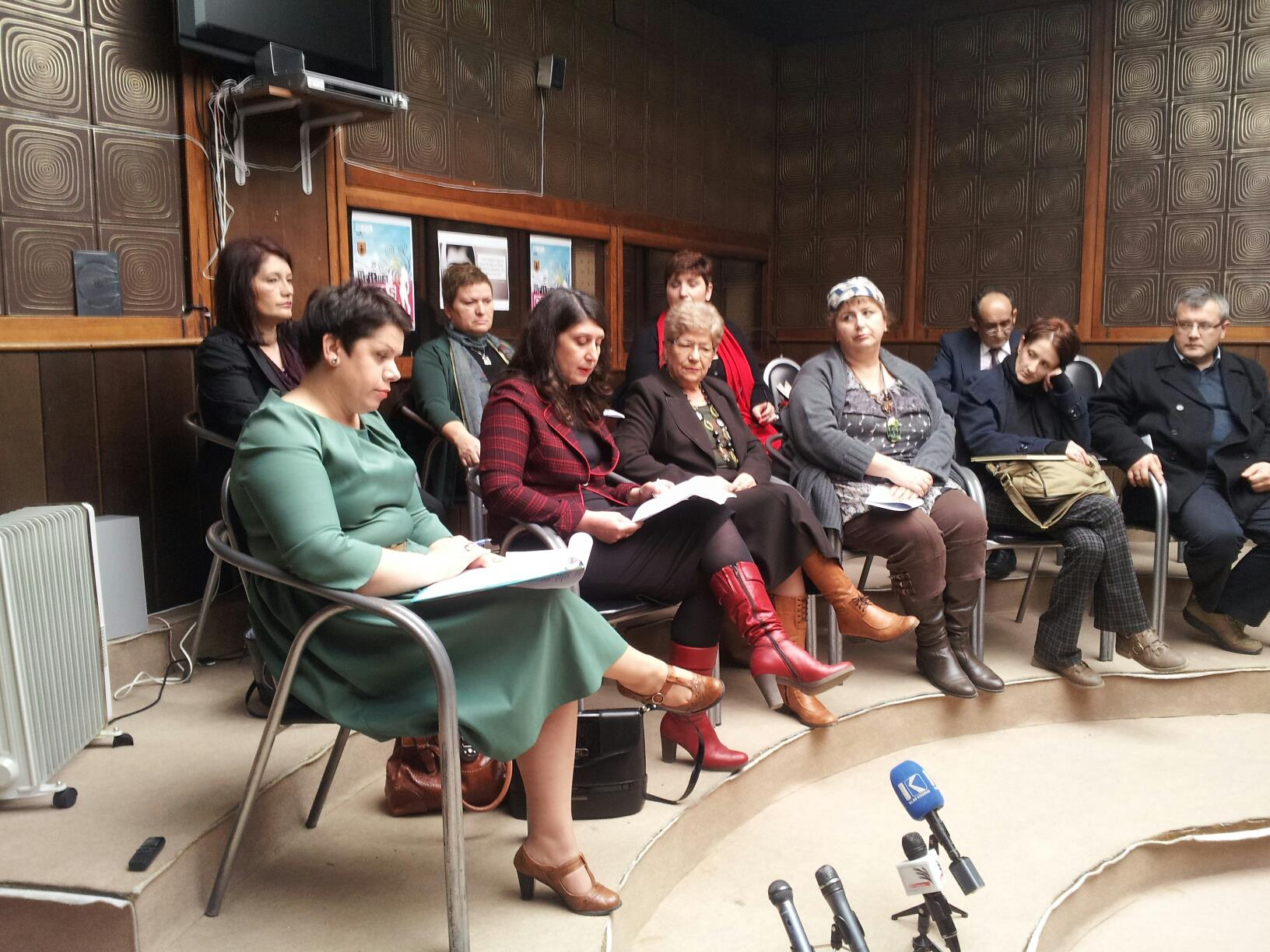
Woman Scream in Kosovo

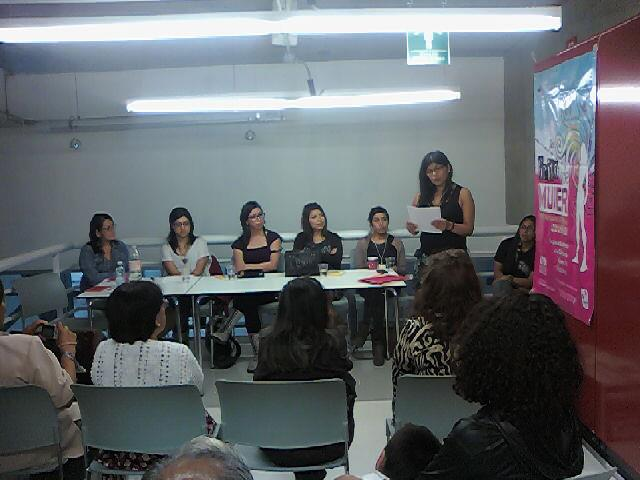
Woman Scream in Mexico DF
Woman Scream Photos

== See also ==
- Woman Scream International Poetry Festival
- Jael Uribe
