= Giulio Meotti =

Italian journalist

Giulio Meotti is an Italian journalist who writes on Middle Eastern and Jewish issues. He is a strong advocate of Israel, and is critical of both the Catholic Church and of Jews who are themselves critical of Israel, regarding them as abettors of anti-semitism. He was subject to accusations of engaging in plagiarizing the work of other journalists, and since has worked for Il Foglio and Arutz Sheva.

== Biography ==
Meotti was born in Arezzo, the son of a goldsmith, who had an extensive clientele of polyglot Jews from whom Meotti is said to have absorbed their cosmopolitan outlook. He graduated in philosophy at the University of Florence with a Phd about George Steiner.

== Criticism of Jewish critics of Israel ==
In his book Jews against Israel (2014) Meotti took to task a large number of Jewish critics of Israel's behavior towards Palestinians, accusing them variously of intellectual treason, Jewish anti-Semitism, being self-hating Jews, suffering from what he claimed was a 'pathology' of Jewish anti-Israelism, or being 'deranged (squilibrati) Jew-haters'. The list of notable Jews he censures for their attitudes towards Israel and defense Palestinian human rights includes George Steiner, philosopher Hannah Arendt, Franco-German politician Daniel Cohn-Bendit, former Chancellor of Austria Bruno Kreisky, screenwriter Tony Kushner, director Steven Spielberg, British historian Eric Hobsbawm, moral philosopher Peter Singer, British politician Gerald Kaufman, French journalist Jean Daniel, French essayist Dominique Vidal, Argentinian civil rights activist Jacobo Timerman, rabbi Arnold Wolf, philosopher Edgar Morin, the United Nations special rapporteur for Palestinian rights Richard A. Falk, the American historian Norman Finkelstein, English film director Mike Leigh, neuroscientist Steven Rose and sociologist Hilary Rose, his wife, rabbi Michael Lerner, playwright Harold Pinter, philosopher Judith Butler, historian Tony Judt, orientalist scholar Maxime Rodinson, Italian novelist Natalia Ginzburg, Italian Germanist Cesare Cases, antifascist intellectual Emilio Sereni, poet and literary critic Franco Fortini, Italian journalist Gad Lerner, Italian playwright and musician Moni Ovadia, Israeli biochemist and Jewish intellectual Yeshayahu Leibowitz, Israeli historian Shlomo Sand, Israeli political geographer Oren Yiftachel, Israeli political scientist Neve Gordon, Israeli journalist Amira Hass, Israeli historian Moshe Zimmermann, Israeli historian Ilan Pappé, Israeli conflict theorist Lev Grinberg, Israeli historians Tom Segev and Idith Zertal, Argentinian musician and comic Danny Rabinovitch, Israeli novelists Amos Oz, David Grossman, and Abraham Yehoshua, Argentinian conductor Daniel Barenboim, diplomat Martin Indyk, survivors of the Holocaust, such as Warsaw ghetto survivor Marek Edelman, Marion Kozak (mother of David Miliband and Ed Miliband), sociologist Zygmunt Bauman, resistance leader Stéphane Hessel, Israeli political scientist Zeev Sternhell, French historian Pierre Vidal-Naquet, Italian writer Primo Levi, and Polish historian Isaac Deutscher.

Meotti's polemic against Jewish writers, thinkers, and cultural figures critical of Israeli actions was described as 'vitriolic' by reviewer Stefano Caviglia writing for Panorama. Caviglia suggested that the real weakness of Jews who are overly critical of Israel lies in a putative inability to resist ‘external pressure’, in what he considers a ‘need to be accepted and considered politically correct by their readers or friends (Jews and non-Jews) of the same political leaning.' At the same time, he added, one should remember that the Jews have an enduring tendency for controversies, as summed up in the age old adage:’Two Jews, three opinions.’

== Work ==
Since 2003, Meotti has written for the Italian daily newspaper Il Foglio, where he is the Cultural Editor. He has in the past written articles for the rightwing think tank Gatestone Institute, The Wall Street Journal, Commentary, National Review, the West Bank settler newspaper Arutz Sheva, Jerusalem Post, Fox News, Jüdische Allgemeine, Yedioth Ahronoth and FrontPage Magazine.

His book A New Shoah: The Untold Story of Israel's Victims of Terrorism, which was translated in English and Norwegian, was described by Israeli President Reuven Rivlin as "a valuable publication that presents a comprehensive picture of the many acts of terrorism against Israeli citizens."

== Charges of plagiarism ==
In mid 2012, Meotti was accused by Marc Tracy in Tablet of being a 'serial plagiarist' for lifting, unacknowledged, material written by other journalists. The accusation was also endorsed by Max Blumenthal who provided several other examples of apparent copyright violations. When this documentation demonstrated that Meotti had a practice of copying other journalists emerged, not only Ynet but also Commentary magazine's John Podhoretz severed their relationship with him for having engaged in journalistic theft. In self-defense, Meotti stated that if he indeed quoted without crediting his sources it was just carelessness, but claimed the accusations were actually a form of demonization of himself, whom he described as one of "the last and few pro-Israel journalists in Europe," part of an ad hominem campaign infused with envy which had been ongoing for some years. According to Blumenthal, Meotti considered the accusations as forms of incitement that put his life at risk.

== Political views ==
Meotti describes himself as a liberal conservative.

== Private life ==
Meotti is married and has two children. He resides in Rome.

== Bibliography ==
- Il processo della scimmia. La guerra dell'evoluzione e le profezie di un vecchio biochimico, Lindau, 2006, ISBN 9788871805795
- Non smetteremo di danzare. Le storie mai raccontate dei martiri d'Israele (A New Shoah: The Untold Story of Israel's Victims of Terrorism), Lindau, 2009, ISBN 9788871808277
- Ebrei contro Israele, Belforte Salomone, 2014, ISBN 9788874670864
- Muoia Israele. La brava gente che odia gli ebrei, Rubbettino, 2015, ISBN 9788849844221
- Hanno ucciso «Charlie Hebdo». Il terrorismo e la resa dell'Occidente: la libertà di espressione è finita, Lindau, 2015, ISBN 9788867084418
- La fine dell'Europa, Cantagalli, 2016, ISBN 9788868794095
- Il suicidio della cultura occidentale: Così l'Islam radicale sta vincendo, Lindau, 2018, ISBN 9788867087921
