= Marius Mjaaland =

Norwegian philosopher

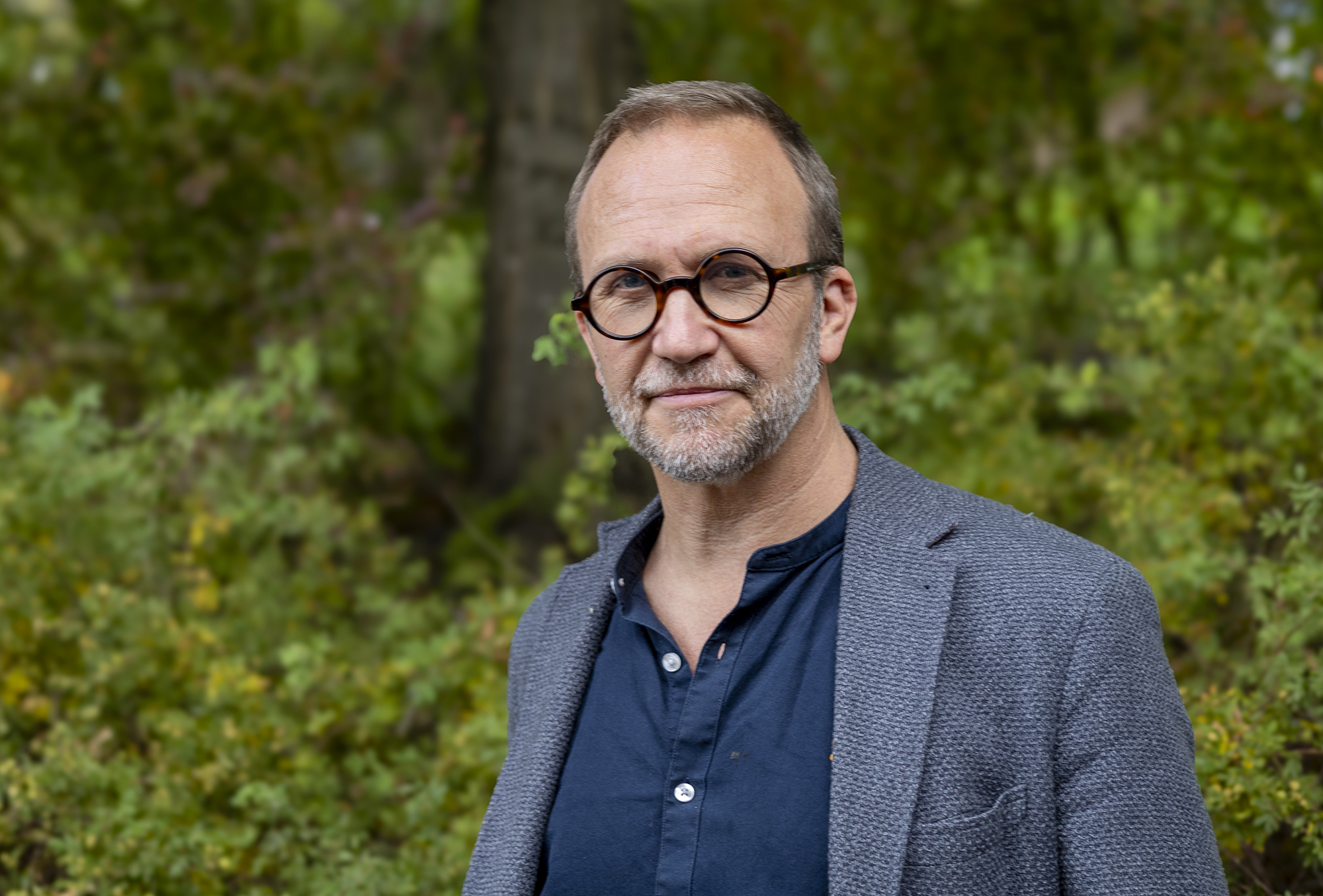

Marius Timmann Mjaaland (born 1971) is a Norwegian philosopher. He is known for his work on environmental philosophy, ethics, phenomenology, philosophy of religion, and systematic theology. He is professor at the University of Oslo.

== Academic career ==
Mjaaland grew up in Oslo, Norway and studied philosophy, religious studies, and theology in University of Oslo, University of Göttingen, and University of Copenhagen. He received an MA in philosophy in 1999 and a PhD from the University of Oslo in 2005 for a dissertation on the philosophy of Søren Kierkegaard and Jacques Derrida. Since then, he has been a visiting scholar at University of Chicago, Heidelberg University, University of Tübingen, University of Rostock, and University of Oxford. Mjaaland was Alexander-von-Humboldt Fellow at the University of Hamburg 2012–13. Since 2014, he has been professor at the Faculty of Theology, University of Oslo; since 2018 as chair for Philosophy of Religion.

In 2006, Mjaaland was elected president of The European Society for Philosophy of Religion (2006–08). A founding member of the Nordic Society for Philosophy of Religion (NSPR) he has been the society's president since 2006. He is also president of the Norwegian Søren Kierkegaard Society since 2005 and gives lectures at conferences and universities worldwide. He is director of the research project Ecodisturb (2020-) at the University of Oslo, doing research on interdisciplinary ecology in the Anthropocene.

Within Ethics, he has done research on organ donation and the life sciences. His article Does Controlled Donation after Circulatory Death Violate the Dead Donor Rule] (w. E.J. Busch) was selected target article in American Journal of Bioethics (Feb 2023) and raised international debate.

== Works ==
- 2008. Autopsia: Self, Death and God after Kierkegaard and Derrida (De Gruyter) ISBN 9783110205237
- 2013. Impossible Time (ed. w. P. Stoellger and U.H. Rasmussen) (Mohr Siebeck) ISBN 9783161519567
- 2013. Forfatterne møter Kierkegaard (w. T.A. Dyrerud) (Press) ISBN 9788275476614
- 2013. Kierkegaard og Norge (w. T.A. Dyrerud) (Press) ISBN 9788275476621
- 2015. Ingen adgang til riket. Religionsfrihetens grenser og Grunnlovens § 2 1814-2014. ISBN 9788270243068
- 2016. The Hidden God: Luther, Philosophy and Political Theology (Indiana University Press) ISBN 9780253018205
- 2017. Systematisk teologi (Verbum) ISBN 9783161592188
- 2019. Formatting Religion (ed.) (Routledge) ISBN 9781138599987
- 2020. The Reformation of Philosophy (ed.) (Mohr Siebeck) ISBN 9783161592188
- 2023. Naturen som gave? (ed. w. K.L. Iversen & E. Oxfeldt) (Scandinavian University Press) ISBN 9788215064567
