= Fjordman =

Norwegian blogger (born 1975)

Peder Jensen
- Born: Peder Are Nøstvold Jensen; 11 June 1975 (age 51); Ålesund, Norway
- Other name: Fjordman (pseudonym)
- Education: University of Bergen; American University in Cairo; University of Oslo (MA)
- Occupation: Blogger
- Years active: 2005–present
- Notable work: Defeating Eurabia

Peder Are Nøstvold Jensen (born 11 June 1975) is a Norwegian far-right counter-jihad blogger who writes under the pseudonym Fjordman. Jensen wrote anonymously as Fjordman starting in 2005, until he disclosed his identity in 2011. He has been active in the counter-jihad movement, which argues that multiculturalism, particularly Muslim mass immigration, poses an existential threat to Western civilization. He has promoted this belief in a self-published book titled Defeating Eurabia, and stated that "Islam, and all those who practice it, must be totally and physically removed from the entire Western world".

Anders Behring Breivik, a neo-Nazi, exploited Fjordman's belief in the Eurabia conspiracy theory, a supposed secret Muslim plan to take over Europe, and quoted him extensively – 111 times – in his manifesto. Fjordman condemned Breivik following his attacks. In 2013, Fjordman was given financial support by the free speech organization Fritt Ord to write a book about the Breivik case.

According to the Norwegian state broadcaster NRK, Fjordman is "considered a 'hero' among the bloggers and debaters constituting the new far right." He has however been described as comparatively considerably more dystopian and pessimistic than others in the movement for his predictions of coming civil wars across Europe, earning him the nickname "the dark prophet of Norway". He is mainly associated with the blog Gates of Vienna.

== Early life, education and work ==
Peder Jensen grew up in Ålesund, with a "Socialist Left-family". His parents are well-known personalities in Ålesund; his father an arranger of music concerts with a past in the former Marxist–Leninist Socialist Youth League (m–l), and his mother a historian and writer. Jensen himself was for a short period in his youth a member of the Socialist Youth, the youth organisation of the Socialist Left Party. In 2011 he said that he was not affiliated with any political party, but that except having voted once in an election for the Labour Party, he has voted for the Progress Party.

Jensen finished his conscription service at the military camp in Setermoen. Considering himself an unsatisfactory soldier, he has never again touched a weapon.

Before writing as Fjordman, Jensen wrote a few times in newspapers using his full name. Early public writings from Jensen appear in 2000 in the national newspaper Dagbladet and the regional paper Sunnmørsposten, where he criticises feminism. He also wrote comments under full name in newspapers Aftenposten and Verdens Gang.

Jensen went on to study Arabic at the University of Bergen and the American University in Cairo. By this time he had already begun to nurture a growing skepticism towards Islamic culture, He was present in Cairo during the September 11 attacks. According to Jensen, "Western media claimed no Arabs were happy about the attacks. This is not true. Some of my neighbors celebrated the event with a spontaneous cake party, and felt what had happened was great." After returning home, Jensen began writing commentaries to Norway's leading newspapers, but claims his controversial opinions were not published by the mainstream media. After having a number of articles rejected, he eventually decided to start his own blog instead. He wrote on several blogs under the pseudonym "Norwegian kafir" in the early 2000s, but eventually took the pseudonym "Fjordman" in 2005.

During his early post-Cairo years Jensen also worked for the Norwegian Ministry of Foreign Affairs in the Middle East. From the start of 2002 to the summer of 2003, he worked for them as an observer in Hebron, in the West Bank, in the service of the Temporary International Presence in Hebron (TIPH). The TIPH mission in Hebron monitors breaches of international humanitarian law and other agreements between the State of Israel and the Palestinian Authority. They communicate their findings to the involved parties and the six member states of TIPH. In April 2003, Jensen came close to being struck by the Mike's Place suicide bombing, while two of his colleagues had been killed in a similar attack the year before.

Following this, he completed his master's degree in culture and technology from the University of Oslo. His master thesis, published in 2004, was titled Blogging Iran – A Case Study of Iranian English Language Weblogs, and discussed censorship and blogging in Iran.

Following this, he worked at a day care centre until 2011, when his identity as the blogger Fjordman was revealed. In August 2011, Norwegian professor Arnulf Hagen claimed that there was much to suggest that Jensen had a Wikipedia account which made 2000 edits. In June 2012, writing as Fjordman, he heavily criticised Wikipedia in an article entitled "The Bias and Dishonesty of Wikipedia" in EuropeNews.

== Writings under the pen name Fjordman ==
Fjordman blogged on his own web log in 2005, giving it up at the end of the year. Since then, he has "guested" and commented in other blogs, mainly on Gates of Vienna, but also on Jihad Watch, Brussels Journal, Faith Freedom International, Free Republic, Daily Pundit, Global Politician and FrontPage Magazine. Fjordman published a compilation of his articles in print via lulu.com in November 2008.

Norwegian historian Vidar Enebakk has criticised the way he thought Fjordman misused academic research for political purposes. Øyvind Strømmen argues that Fjordman's essays fulfill all the criteria of Roger Griffin's definition of fascism.

== Views ==
Jensen has written negatively about multiculturalism, the European Union, feminism and Islam. He is an outspoken proponent of Bat Ye'or's conspiracy theory of "Eurabia", according to which Europe and the Arab states would join forces to make life impossible for Israel and Islamize the old continent. Jensen wrote an essay titled "The Eurabia Code" in support of the concept, in which he says that "[T]he 'Jewish threat' in the 1930s was entirely fictional, whereas the 'Islamic threat' now is very real." His self-published book compiling his articles is titled Defeating Eurabia. According to The Independent, Jensen writes "screeds accusing Muslims of secretly planning to take over Europe." As a solution to this imagined invasion, Jensen advocates the deportation of all Muslims back to their homelands.

The Norwegian News Agency has stated that "Fjordman" "[is] considered a very central far-right and anti-Islamic voice in Europe." Andrew Brown characterises him as "[an] Islamophobe who has for years been predicting civil war between Muslims and their neighbours." The researcher Terje Emberland at the Norwegian Center for Studies of Holocaust and Religious Minorities states that "Fjordman"'s views are based on a conspiracy theory, and that "Islamophobes like Fjordman believe they have seen through an evil power that will throw Europe into a civil war. Therefore, they argue that all means must be used to save the Western culture; implicit in this is the threat of violence."

Jensen believes that the Western governments promoting the influx of non-white immigrants are demonstrating "white masochism", and that white people have the right to "preserve [their] heritage" and are "under no obligation to commit collective suicide". He denies that this is a white supremacist view, stating that "Whites ... are currently the only racial group specifically denied the opportunity to defend their countries and heritage." He also rejects accusations of racism, stating that "non-whites attacking whites" constitutes "the vast majority of racist violence in Western nations". He argues that "White critics of mass immigration" are systematically demonized as racists and right-wing extremists. Jensen argues for the preservation of a white European majority, and demands an extremely restrictive immigration policy, the dissolution of the European Union and the "rejection of multiculturalism". He argues that otherwise, Europeans would have to conclude that the governments have given up on their people, and that the laws and taxes which they impose on them are therefore illegitimate.

=== On Islam ===
In November 2015 Fjordman summarized his view of Islam as "a permanent world war":

"Islam contains elements of a traditional religion, but also elements of a totalitarian belief system centered around a personality cult of Mohammad. Islam is a creed of war, not a religion of peace. In theory, this war will end when all human beings on Earth have submitted to Islamic rule and eventually become Muslims. In practice, experience show us that Muslim societies are far from peaceful. Muslims will continue to fight amongst themselves over who are the best and truest Muslims. Islam can with some justification be classified as a permanent world war, a war that has so far been raging for fourteen centuries and claimed countless lives.

== 2011 Norway attacks ==
Shortly after the bombing of Oslo in the 2011 Norway attacks (when it still was believed the terrorist was an Islamist), Fjordman asked his regular readers at the Gates of Vienna blog to "remember" that Norwegian Prime Minister Jens Stoltenberg was as much a "pathetic sucker for Islam as it is humanly possible to be" and his Labour/Socialist Left/Centre Party government "the most dhimmi appeasing of all Western governments (…) suicidal and cowardly". When the shooting at Utøya became known a few hours later, Fjordman described the Workers' Youth League (AUF) under attack as a "gang of anti-Israeli, pro-Palestine youth-socialists". Jensen also voiced a rather basic antipathy towards Oslo's immigrant population: in relation to a TV interview with a man referred to as a "Norwegian eyewitness" – a person of Arab origin who had the windows of his restaurant blown to pieces by the blast – a Gates of Vienna reader sarcastically said to Jensen that he did not know Norwegians looked so much like Arabs. Jensen's reply was that "in Oslo they do. Arabs, Kurds, Pakistanis, Somalis, you name it. Anything and everything is fine as long as they rape the natives and destroy the country, which they do".

Anders Behring Breivik, the far-right terrorist who committed the 2011 Norway attacks, frequently praised writings of Fjordman, citing him extensively in his manifesto. In terms of goals and means Breivik is quoted as saying, "Our views are quite similar with the exception of me being an actual armed resistance fighter." In response to learning the identity of the terrorist, Fjordman strongly distanced himself from Breivik, whom he referred to as a "violent psychopath", and said he "intensely dislike[d]" the fact that he was cited by Breivik. He also advocated giving Breivik the death penalty.

In particular, there is a 2008 article in the anti-Islamic blog The Brussels Journal where Fjordman focuses on a quote from Norwegian social anthropologist Thomas Hylland Eriksen:

"Our most important task ahead is to deconstruct the majority, and we must deconstruct them so thoroughly that they will never be able to call themselves the majority again." –Thomas Hylland Eriksen (2008)

Apparently based on Fjordman's article, this quote has since become a focal point of the 1,500-page manifesto of Breivik, as well as Breivik's defence speech during his 2012 trial. Following the terror attacks the quote has been oft repeated by right-wing extremists all across Europe. Eriksen has since admitted that taken out of context the quote does look scary, but that it has a much more innocent meaning when properly understood. He was actually saying that not enough research had been done on the diversity within the Norwegian-ethnicity population.

In the aftermath of the attacks, the police confiscated Jensen's PC and questioned him, saying they wanted to "investigate how [he] might have influenced the charged man". In the weeks following the terrorist attacks, there was intense speculation regarding his identity. The week after the attacks Jensen reported to PST, the Norwegian internal security police. A few days later he was called in for questioning, and agreed to have his premises searched. The same day he revealed his identity in an interview with the newspaper Verdens Gang, and proclaimed that he would never again blog under the pseudonym Fjordman. He also questioned whether he would ever return to blogging, citing his exhaustion from the time after the attacks.

The next day he did blog under that name, describing how he had felt abused when the police searched through his house, a treatment he viewed as "politically motivated". Prior to the search Jensen hid his computer in a safety deposit box at the central station in Oslo. According to the police he had not intended to provide the computer, but changed his mind when he understood that the police would ask for a court order if he refused.

== Blog announcement of 10 October 2011 ==
On 10 October 2011, Jensen announced on a blog that due to having been involuntarily mixed in with the Breivik-case, he had become unemployed and was in the process of finding a new place to live. He in turn asked for donations from his supporters in what he dubbed a "Fjordman Relocation Fund". He also complained that his reply to a critical article in newspaper Aftenposten had been rejected by the newspaper (it was instead, however, published on the same blog), and about having been indirectly parodied in a Norwegian Broadcasting Corporation show as a paraplegic character whose last name was "Fjordland."

== Continued writings ==
Jensen wrote in an opinion piece published in Verdens Gang on 24 October, under the headline "Fjordman lives on," that he would continue writing with "undiminished force." He also announced that he would continue publishing his writings on blogs in English and Norwegian if newspapers would not publish them, and that he planned to release a new book by the next year. In an opinion piece published in Aftenposten the same day, he complained about what he considered to be harassment by the police in the aftermath of the July terror attacks.

In 2013, Jensen was granted 75,000 Norwegian kroner from the Fritt Ord foundation for a book he was writing on the Breivik case, titled Vitne til vanvidd [Witness to Madness]. The grant was criticized by AUF leader Eskil Pedersen and others who considered the grant as giving a platform to political extremism and offensive to victims and survivors of the 2011 terror attacks. Initially, no Norwegian publisher was willing to publish Fjordman's work. After being published in Denmark in 2015, the Norwegian Document Forlag eventually chose to publish the book in 2020.

In July 2013 an editor at Dagsavisen called Fjordman "one of Europe's most influential Islamophobe ideologists" and grouped him with Vidkun Quisling, Anders Behring Breivik and Varg Vikernes as a "great internationally known extremist of hate". Jensen wrote in response that unlike the other three, all convicted criminals, he had not even received a parking ticket.

In a 2016 review of the book in Aftenposten, Per Anders Madsen writes that Fjordman comes across as less extreme than previously, which he attributes both to having become more accustomed to anti-Muslim attitudes, as well as the new situation following the European migrant crisis. There was a debate among Norwegian commentators around the same time whether Fjordman should be allowed to participate in debates about immigration.

== Print publications ==
- Defeating Eurabia. Bj Books, 2008. ISBN 978-1-4092-4715-9
- Europa verteidigen. Zehn Texte. Albersroda 2011. ISBN 978-3-935063-66-1
- Vitne til vanvidd. Free speech library, 2015 (1st edition). Document, 2020 (2nd edition). ISBN 9788275192286

== See also ==
- Counter-jihad
- Eurabia
