= Eurabia conspiracy theory =

Far-right Islamophobic conspiracy theory

The Eurabia conspiracy theory, often simply called Eurabia (a blend word of Europe and Arabia), is an Islamophobic and far-right conspiracy theory. It claims that European politicians, led by France, are conspiring with Arab regimes to Islamize and Arabize Europe, weaken European culture, and sever ties with the United States and Israel.

The theory was developed by Bat Ye'or (the pen name of Egyptian-born Jewish-British author Gisèle Littman) in the early 2000s and described in her 2005 book Eurabia: The Euro‐Arab Axis. The concept originated primarily among pro-Israel and neoconservative commentators, including Bat Ye'or, Melanie Phillips, and David Pryce-Jones, who argued that European leaders were betraying Israel to appease Arab nations. Benjamin Lee of the Centre for Research and Evidence on Security Threats at Lancaster University described her work as arguing that Europe "has surrendered to Islam and is in a state of submission (described as dhimmitude) in which Europe is forced to deny its own culture, stand silently by in the face of Muslim atrocities, accept Muslim immigration, and pay tribute through various types of economic assistance." According to the theory, the blame rests with a broad range of groups including: communists, fascists, the media, universities, mosques and Islamic cultural centres, European bureaucrats, and the Euro-Arab Dialogue.

The term has gained some public interest and it has also been used and discussed by activists across a wide range of the political spectrum, including right-wing activists, self-described "conservatives", counter-jihadists, and other anti-Islam activists. Bat Ye'or's "mother conspiracy theory" has been used as the basis for other subtheories. The narrative grew important among people who expressed anti-Islamic sentiments and it was also used by members and supporters of movements like Stop Islamisation of Europe. It gained renewed interest after the use of the term by Anders Behring Breivik, the perpetrator of the 2011 Norway attacks. Ye'or's thesis has come under criticism by scholars, which intensified after Breivik's crime. The conspiracy theory has been described as having a resemblance to the antisemitic The Protocols of the Elders of Zion.

== Basic narrative ==
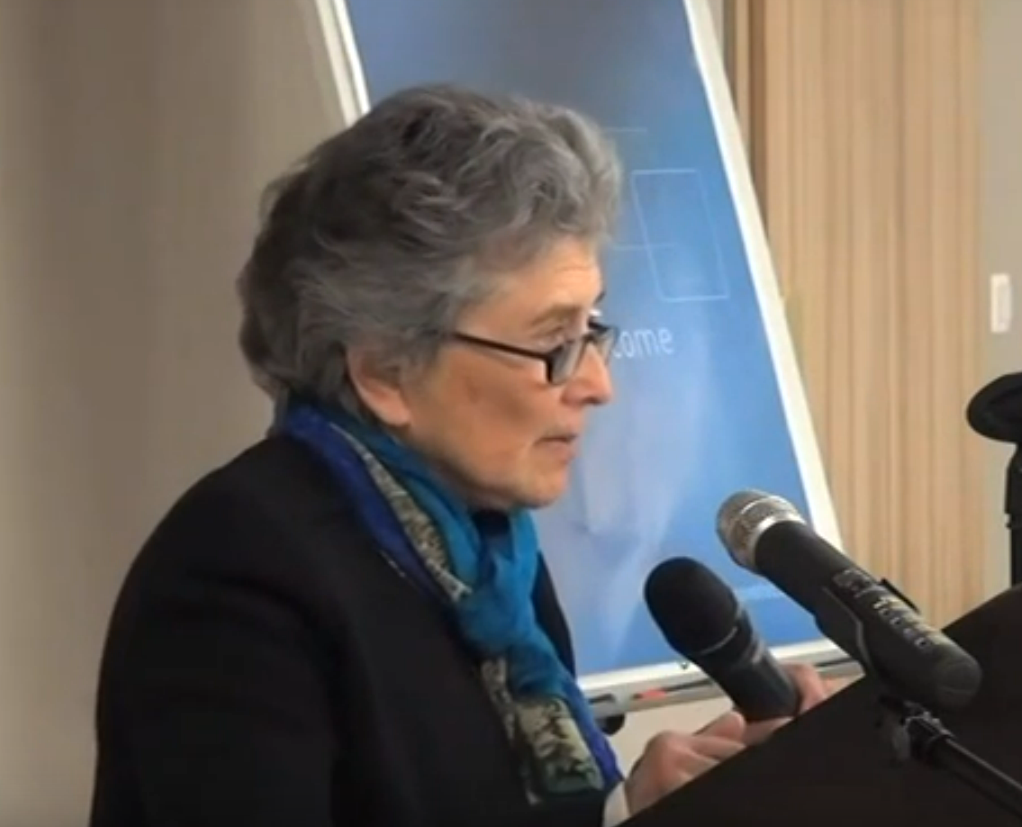
Bat Ye'or, who developed the Eurabia conspiracy theory in the early 2000s

In Eurabia: The Euro-Arab Axis, Bat Ye'or says that Eurabia is the result of the Euro-Arab Dialogue, based on an allegedly French-led European policy intended to increase European power against the United States by aligning its interests with those of the Arab countries. During the 1973 oil crisis, the European Economic Community (predecessor of the European Union), had entered into the Euro-Arab Dialogue (EAD) with the Arab League. Ye'or says it was a primary cause of alleged European hostility to Israel, referring to joint Euro-Arab foreign policies that she characterises as anti-American and anti-Zionist. Ye'or posited a Eurabia conspiracy and used the term "dhimmitude", denoting alleged "western subjection to Islam". The term itself is based on a newsletter published in the 1970s by the Comité européen de coordination des associations d'amitié avec le monde arabe, a Euro-Arab friendship committee.

Bat Ye'or's book was the first in what scholars and journalists describe as an emergent Eurabia literary genre, which came to include works such as Melanie Phillips's Londonistan, Oriana Fallaci's The Force of Reason, and Bruce Bawer's While Europe Slept. The theme was subsequently popularized by conservative commentators like Mark Steyn and embraced across online counter-jihad networks, notably by the blogger Fjordman (Peder Are Nøstvold Jensen).

An important part of the narrative is the concept of a demographic threat, the claim that Muslim birthrates will lead to an Islamic takeover of the continent, or, as historian Bernard Lewis controversially claimed in 2004, that "Europe will be Islamic by the end of the century."

== Impact ==
Bat Ye'or introduced the term in 2002 during the political aftermath of the September 11 attacks, when public debate over Islamic extremism surged in Western countries. In 2004, historian Niall Ferguson popularized the term in The New York Times Magazine, arguing that demographic trends and secularization pointed toward the gradual Islamisation of the continent.

=== European politics ===
The idea of a Eurabian conspiracy has become a basic theme in the European extremist and populist right and represents a significant strategic shift. Political scientist José Pedro Zúquete writes that "the threat that the Crescent will rise over the continent and the spectre of a Muslim Europe have become basic ideological features and themes of the European extreme right."

Muslim minority populations and Muslim immigration gained new political significance. This has led to the adoption of political positions that were previously considered fringe or third rail on either side. The main anti-Islamic theme has also penetrated into mainstream European politics, for instance in the rhetoric of Dutch populist Party for Freedom leader Geert Wilders, who in a 2009 parliamentary speech accused the government of "enthusiastically co-operating with the Islamisation of the Netherlands" and predicted that Muslims would soon comprise one-fifth of the European population.

== Issues ==
The Eurabia concept is an Islamophobic conspiracy theory. Eurabia reduces the complex interactions between the US, France, Israel, and Arab and Muslim countries to an "us against them" narrative. The Eurabia theories are dismissed as Islamophobic, extremist and conspiracy theories in the academic community. At first academics showed little interest in the Eurabia theories due to their lack of factual basis. The theme was treated in studies of rightist extremism and Middle East politics. This changed after the 2011 Norway attacks, which resulted in the publication of several scholarly works specifically analyzing the Eurabia conspiracy theories.

=== Demography ===
Demographic studies have consistently contradicted predictions that Europe will develop a Muslim majority. In a comprehensive 2017 demographic report projecting scenarios through 2050, the Pew Research Center estimated that Muslims would comprise between 7.4% (under a zero-migration model) and 14% (under a high-migration model) of Europe's population, depending on future migration flows. Earlier Pew projections in 2011 had similarly concluded that "the data that we have isn't pointing in the direction of 'Eurabia' at all".

Demographic analyses note that alarmist claims rely on assuming indefinitely high fertility rates among Muslim immigrants. In reality, fertility rates among immigrant communities tend to decline rapidly and converge toward native European averages over subsequent generations. Historian Justin Vaïsse similarly pointed out that Muslims in Europe do not constitute a monolithic or cohesive political bloc, that birthrates decline with socioeconomic integration, and that European Muslims have not exercised coordinated influence over foreign policy.

Sociological research also contradicts claims of widespread refusal to integrate. Cross-national surveys by the Bertelsmann Stiftung's Religion Monitor found that over 90% of Muslims in Western Europe support democracy, actively participate in civic life, and express strong attachment to their home countries rather than foreign regimes.

== Spread of conspiracies and further influences ==
During the 2010s, the Eurabia narrative was largely overtaken by the broader Great Replacement conspiracy theory, which similarly claimed that white Europeans were being deliberately replaced through Muslim immigration.

=== Europe ===
==== France ====
Although Bat Ye'or claimed France led the conspiracy, mainstream French politicians rarely used the term "Eurabia". Similar themes of demographic replacement later entered mainstream French politics, most notably during the 2022 presidential campaign of far-right candidate Éric Zemmour.

==== Germany ====
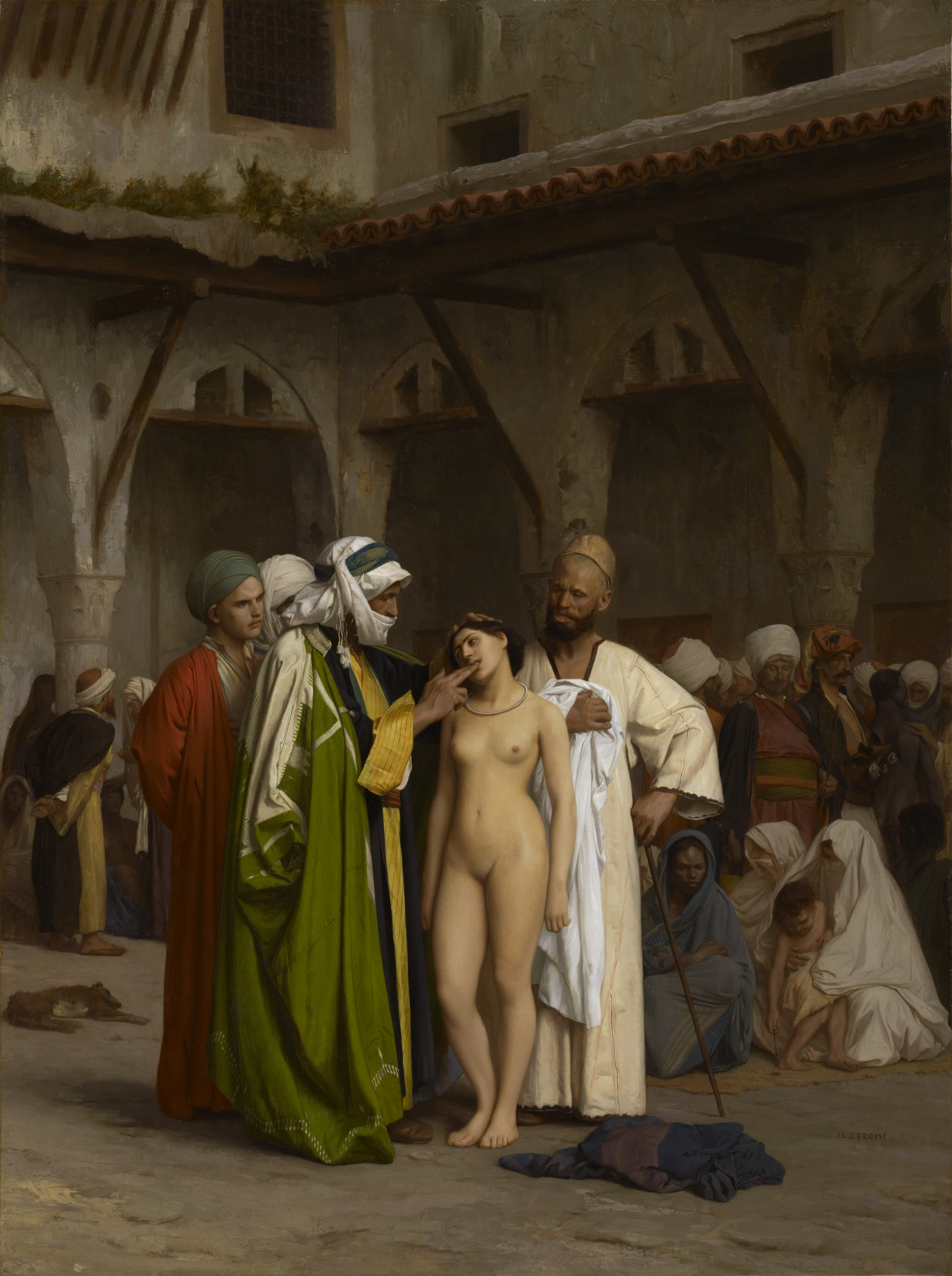
Jean-Léon Gérôme's The Slave Market (1886), used in 2019 campaign posters by the AfD with the slogan "So Europe doesn't become Eurabia!"

In 2010, German politician Thilo Sarrazin released Germany Abolishes Itself. The book contends that with continued Islamic immigration, Germany will become a majority Muslim nation. Journalist Simon Kuper has argued that, with over 1 million copies sold, Sarrazin had done more to publicize the concept of Eurabia than anybody else in Europe.

In political campaigning for the 2019 European Parliament election, Germany's far-right party Alternative for Germany (AfD) used Jean-Léon Gérôme's 1886 painting The Slave Market with the slogan "Europeans vote AfD!" and "So Europe doesn't become Eurabia!". In January 2024, investigative outlet Correctiv revealed that AfD politicians had attended the 2023 Potsdam far-right meeting with neo-Nazi activists to discuss a plan for mass deportations of immigrants and non-assimilated citizens, a concept known as "remigration" derived from replacement and Eurabia theories.

==== Hungary ====
In Central Europe, Hungarian Prime Minister Viktor Orbán and his ruling Fidesz party incorporated Eurabia-style themes into official state messaging following the 2015 European migrant crisis. Orbán repeatedly described Muslim migration as a deliberate plot by European Union leadership to dilute European Christian identity, using replacement narratives in national election campaigns and government-sponsored billboards.

==== Italy ====
In 2004, journalist Oriana Fallaci claimed that Muslim immigration and high fertility were part of an Islamic strategy to take over Europe. In 2005, Fallaci told The Wall Street Journal that "Europe is no longer Europe", adding "it is 'Eurabia,' a colony of Islam".

In 2011, Francesco Speroni, a sitting MEP for Lega Nord, stated that he agreed with Anders Behring Breivik's claim "that we are going towards Eurabia". Following the 2011 Norway attacks, Speroni reaffirmed his support for the Eurabia concept in an interview with Radio 24.

In 2018, Giulio Meotti referenced the theory regarding European demographics, writing that "Europe is over. Its future will be a mix of Eurabia and a geriatric ward."

In May 2019, ahead of the European elections, the Lega Nord leader for Sarzana claimed that both the European People's Party and the Party of European Socialists were working to establish Eurabia. The day before the vote, Italian Deputy Prime Minister Matteo Salvini endorsed the theory and asserted that Sweden had already become Eurabia, prompting an official denial from the Swedish embassy. Invoking Fallaci, Salvini posted an anti-migration speech with the slogan "No to Eurabia".

==== Netherlands ====
Party for Freedom leader Geert Wilders, who campaigned on warnings of "Eurabia" and "Netherabia"

In 2008, journalist Arthur van Amerongen described Molenbeek as "Brussels: Eurabia". Despite alleging that writer Wim van Rooy had already coined the phrase, Amerongen faced severe peer and media criticism for endorsing the conspiracy theory. After the November 2015 Paris attacks and discovery of a Brussels ISIL terror cell, photojournalist Teun Voeten agreed with Amerongen's description, calling the municipality an "ethnic and religious enclave".

Party for Freedom leader Geert Wilders has stated that "if we do not stop Islamification now, Eurabia and Netherabia will just be a matter of time." Wilders claims that Muslim immigration to Europe is driven by agreements between the European Union and Islamic countries. In the 2023 Dutch general election, Wilders's Party for Freedom won a plurality of seats in the House of Representatives, leading to the formation of a right-wing coalition government in 2024 that prioritized strict curbs on asylum and immigration.

==== Norway ====
In 2008, Peder Are Nøstvold Jensen, writing under his pseudonym Fjordman, published Defeating Eurabia. The book contends that one in three babies born in France are from a Muslim background, and that there are hundreds of "Muslim ghettos" following Sharia law in the country, which Fjordman believes will either be overrun or face an impending civil war.

2083: A European Declaration of Independence, the manifesto of Anders Behring Breivik, the perpetrator of the 2011 Norway attacks, includes a lengthy discussion of and support for the "Eurabia" theory. It also contains several articles on the Eurabia theme by Bat Ye'or and Fjordman. As a result, the theory received widespread mainstream media attention following the attacks. In the verdict against Breivik, the court said that "many people share Breivik's conspiracy theory, including the Eurabia theory. The court finds that very few people, however, share Breivik's idea that the alleged 'Islamization' should be fought with terror."

Breivik later stated that he previously had exploited "counterjihad" rhetoric in order to protect "ethno-nationalists", thereby instead launching a media drive against what he deemed "anti-nationalist counterjihad" supporters.

==== United Kingdom ====
The theories presented by David Pryce-Jones in Betrayal: France, the Arabs, and the Jews (2008) and Theodore Dalrymple in The New Vichy Syndrome: Why European Intellectuals Surrender to Barbarism (2011) share a common premise: that a rapid demographic shift in Europe has been deliberately engineered by European politicians and civil servants, and will lead to a Muslim majority hostile toward host nations. Related themes, including the alleged subversion of bureaucracies, the intelligentsia, and political leaders, are frequent in this literature.

British counter-jihad figures, including Tommy Robinson (Stephen Yaxley-Lennon) and groups like Britain First, repeatedly used Eurabia concepts to depict Muslims as an invading demographic force. In 2024, researchers reporting to the UK Parliament identified Eurabia and replacement narratives as major drivers of the 2024 United Kingdom riots, where online misinformation about Muslim migrants led to violent attacks on mosques and hotels housing asylum seekers.

=== North America ===
==== Canada ====
Author Mark Steyn, described as a "champion of 'Eurabia' myth" by Canadian newspaper The Globe and Mail, predicted an emerging Eurabia dominated by Islam and hostile to Western interests. Steyn's promotion of the theory centered on demographic arguments that Muslim population growth would force the assimilation of white Europeans. In 2008, excerpts from Steyn's book published in Maclean's prompted hate-speech complaints before the Canadian Human Rights Commission, which were ultimately dismissed but triggered a national debate on free expression.

==== United States ====
In the United States, Eurabia gained support among counter-jihad activists and neoconservative commentators, including Stop Islamization of America co-founder Robert Spencer and Middle East Forum head Daniel Pipes. Pipes promoted the concept in publications like The National Interest, arguing that Europe risked becoming culturally Islamic.

These ideas influenced mainstream American conservative politics during the 2010s. Political figures, including 2012 presidential candidate Rick Santorum and conservative commentator Steve Bannon, warned that Europe was collapsing due to demographic shifts and Islamic immigration. In 2018, Donald Trump's ambassador to the Netherlands, Pete Hoekstra, faced international criticism after claiming that the Islamic movement had created "no-go zones" in the Netherlands where politicians and cars were being set on fire, echoing claims made by Geert Wilders and Eurabia proponents.

== Criticism ==
The Economist rejected the concept of Eurabia as "scaremongering". Simon Kuper in the Financial Times described Ye'or's book as "little-read but influential", and akin to "The Protocols of the Elders of Zion in reverse", adding that "though ludicrous, Eurabia became the spiritual mother of a genre".

David Aaronovitch acknowledges that the threat of "jihadist terror" may be real, but that there is no threat of Eurabia. Aaronovitch concludes that those who study conspiracy theories will recognize Eurabia to be a theory that adds the "Sad Dupes thesis to the Enemy Within idea".

In his 2007 book Wars of Blood and Faith, conservative US military analyst Ralph Peters dismissed the Eurabia scenario, arguing that demographic projections overlooked Europe's historical record of violent overreaction to perceived threats, such as in the Balkans during the 1990s and the Holocaust during World War II. Peters argued that if a Muslim takeover ever appeared imminent, European populations would resort to forced deportations or genocide rather than submission, possibly provoking American intervention on behalf of persecuted European Muslims.

According to Marján and Sapir, the very idea of "Eurabia" is "based on an extremist conspiracy theory, according to which Europe and the Arab states would join forces to make life impossible for Israel and Islamize the old continent."

Writing in Race & Class in 2006, Matt Carr argued that Eurabia had moved from "an outlandish conspiracy theory" to a "dangerous Islamophobic fantasy". He observed that accepting Ye'or's thesis requires believing in a secret, continent-wide conspiracy between European leaders and Arab states to transform European institutions into "instruments of 'jihad'" without the public, media, or elected bodies noticing.

Critics compare the Eurabia narrative to the antisemitic forgery The Protocols of the Elders of Zion, with Israeli journalist Adi Schwartz calling it "the Protocols of the Elders of Brussels". Sociologist Reza Zia-Ebrahimi describes this as "conspiratorial racialization": the narrative copies the structural template of antisemitic plots, replacing the supposed Jewish cabal with Arab leaders and castigating European officials as traitors. Arun Kundnani writes that Eurabia fills the same structural need for the counter-jihad movement that the Protocols filled for 20th-century fascists.

While Bat Ye'or and several early proponents developed the theory from a pro-Israel stance, traditional white supremacists later co-opted the narrative. Groups within the extreme right incorporated anti-Muslim replacement fears while retaining antisemitic tropes, claiming that Jewish elites were secretly orchestrating non-white immigration to Europe. Researchers link these demographic theories directly to subsequent far-right violence, including the 2019 Christchurch mosque shootings.

Doug Saunders argues that pro-Al-Qaeda writers and Eurabia theorists share the same worldview, falsely reducing complex societies to a clash between a uniform Muslim world and the West.

== See also ==
- Counter-jihad
- Cultural Marxism conspiracy theory
- Demographic threat
- Great Replacement
- Islamophobia in Europe
- Kalergi Plan
- White genocide conspiracy theory
