= Columbia Unbecoming controversy =

Academic dispute involving three Columbia University professors

In 2004, during the Second Intifada, a group of pro-Israel students at Columbia University in New York City, along with the pro-Israel campus group The David Project, produced the 25-minute film Columbia Unbecoming presenting interviews with some students and the campus Jewish chaplain Rabbi Charles Sheer about professors in the department of Middle East and Asian Languages and Cultures (MEALAC)—mainly George Saliba, Joseph Massad, and Hamid Dabashi—whom they described as biased against Israel and whom they accused of misconduct. Massad said the episodes concerning him did not take place and that none of the people in the film had been students of his, describing the film project as a "witch-hunt." Saliba too denied that the episode concerning him happened as described in the film. Critics of the film called the film "propaganda" and described it as part of a "smear campaign" against professors critical of Israel.

There were select screenings of the film in the autumn of 2004. Some of the students interviewed said they had been intimidated by the three professors over their pro-Israel views. Others complained about an atmosphere that was hostile to Israel. Pro-Israel pundits, including figures such as Anthony Weiner, called for Columbia to fire Joseph Massad, who was not yet tenured at the time. Columbia initiated an inquiry by an ad‑hoc faculty committee, which concluded in 2005 that there was no evidence to support allegations of antisemitism against Massad.

The controversy sparked a national debate on the topic of academic freedom and its limits. Many felt that Massad was the target of a witch-hunt for his pro-Palestinian views and that the controversy was part of a larger campaign to rein in academic freedom in the U.S. Some argued that the students' perception of bias against Israel stemmed from their unfamiliarity with the Israeli–Palestinian conflict and the social conditioning of a strongly pro-Israel society.

== Background ==
The David Project, which produced the film, was a Boston-based, pro-Israel campus group, founded by Charles Jacobs and Avi Goldwasser, in 2002. It met with LionPAC, a pro-Israel student group at Columbia, and agreed to fund the film. Rabbi Charles Sheer, director of the Columbia-Barnard chapter of Hillel and central figure in the film, had led a campaign in 2003 against a proposal to divest from companies selling arms to Israel that gathered 33,000 signatures in support.

Columbia University is an Ivy League university, in New York, where about one quarter of the undergraduate students are Jewish. Lee Bollinger, a First Amendment scholar, became Columbia's president in 2002, after having served for five years as the President of the University of Michigan. Alan Brinkley became the provost of Columbia on July 1, 2003.

The three professors that would be named in Columbia Unbecoming, Joseph Massad, George Saliba, and Hamid Dabashi, all worked at Columbia's Middle East and Asian Languages and Cultures department, colloquially known as MEALAC. MEALAC was a small department with only 20 full-time professors. Saliba and Dabashi both had tenure, but not Massad who would come to stand in the center of the controversy.

The student newspaper at Columbia, Columbia Daily Spectator, covered the controversy extensively as it unfolded, as did the small but influential conservative newspaper The New York Sun.

== Beginning of the controversy ==
Massad received his doctorate in political science from Columbia in 1998. Next year he began teaching at the university. He taught one elective course called Palestinian and Israeli Politics and Societies for which he became known, as his views on Israel and Palestine differed with those of many of his students.

Massad recalled that, in the spring 2001, Jewish students in his class began to tell him that he was discussed at the Jewish Theological Seminary and at Hillel and that his class upset Zionists. According to Massad, he didn't think much about it but he began to notice "cantankerous students who insisted on scoring political points during the lectures." For the spring 2002, he updated the course description to ensure that students understood that the course was critical of both Zionism and Palestinian nationalism (emphasis in the original):

The course examines critically the impact of Zionism on European Jews and on Asian and African Jews on the one hand, and on Palestinian Arabs on the other – in Israel, in the Occupied Territories, and in the Diaspora. The course also examines critically the internal dynamics in Palestinian and Israeli societies, looking at the roles class, gender, and religion play in the politics of Israel and the Palestinian national movement. The purpose of the course is not to provide a "balanced" coverage of the views of both sides, but rather to provide a thorough yet critical historical overview of the Zionist-Palestinian conflict to familiarize undergraduates with the background to the current situation from a critical perspective.

Nevertheless, a student circulated a petition in his class to get him fired. But following a visit to Israel and the Palestinian occupied territories, she was remorseful and told him that someone "from the outside" had asked her to circulate the petition.

On 26 February 2002, Daphna Berman wrote an op-ed in the Spectator, which referenced a lecture Massad had held recently titled "Zionism and Jewish Supremacy". Berman compared Massad's lecture with a swastika that recently had been found in a bathroom on campus:

I was struck by the University's willingness to publicly condemn blatant expressions of anti-Semitism [such as the swastika incident] while simultaneously condoning, and even sponsoring, more tacit and subtle forms of that same evil. Massad's talk is lent a certain legitimacy by mere virtue of the fact that his views exist within an academic framework. The rhetoric is polished, the multisyllabic words characteristic of academia are pleasing to the ear, and so Massad's message somehow becomes more acceptable, more palatable. Yet fundamentally, the difference between Massad's message and its more blatant and visually tangible manifestation are only subtle.

== Leadup to Columbia Unbecoming ==
=== Pro-Palestinian rally ===
Massad, in a speech at a large pro-Palestinian rally on campus on April 17, compared Israel with apartheid-era South Africa, saying:

Like white South Africans who felt threatened under apartheid and who only felt safe when they gave up their commitment to white supremacy, Israeli Jews will continue to feel threatened if they persist in supporting Jewish supremacy. Israeli Jews will only feel safe in a democratic Israeli state where all Jews and Arabs are treated equally. No state has the right to be a racist state.

In an article in the Columbia Spectator, Massad was quoted as saying that Israel is "a Jewish supremacist and racist state" and "every racist state should be threatened." Massad complained to the journalist who wrote the article. She admitted to not having attended the rally, and the Spectator ran a correction on April 24, 2002.

Dabashi and some other professors cancelled their classes so that they could attend the rally. He argued in an email sent to his students the day after that he was "morally bound to perform a public duty," but apologized for the inconvenience the cancellation caused and promised that it would be made up for with an additional session. The cancellations irritated Columbia's Hillel Director Rabbi Charles Sheer and some students. In a letter to the Spectator called the cancellations "not kosher" and unacceptable that some professors didn't inform the students in advance. "To have students come to a class and advise them only then that the class is cancelled because the professor is about to deliver a public speech is a coercive invitation," he argued.

Dabashi and Saliba repudiated Sheer's claims in letters published on May 3 in the Spectator. Dabashi's reply was particularly dismissive:

It is a sad and astonishingly degenerate development in the American academy when a Jewish rabbi, a Christian priest, a Muslim mullah, or any other figure of religious authority ventures to step out of his or her role as a preacher and interferes with the cornerstone of academic freedom at a university. Rabbi Charles Sheer, Jewish chaplain and director of Hillel at Columbia University and Barnard College, has taken upon himself the task of mobilizing and spearheading a crusade of fear and intimidation against members of the Columbia faculty and students who have dared to speak against the slaughter of innocent Palestinians. ... I have absolutely no reason to honor the preaching of a misplaced rabbi, priest, or mullah in the University. If I ever care to enter a synagogue, a church, or a mosque, I am duty-bound to honor the office of the presiding rabbi, priest, or mullah. But if for whatever misguided reason, a rabbi, a priest, or a mullah finds his or her way into academic affairs, I expect no less and demand that they behave within the boundaries of rules of conduct operative in our secular institution. ... he has absolutely no authority whatsoever to interpret University policy. Those who are--namely our collectively acknowledged administrators, senators, and the overwhelming majority of our students--have found nothing wrong or remotely questionable in our conduct.

Saliba, expressing much the same sentiment, urged Sheer: "Rabbi! Just preach! Do not even attempt to teach!"

=== Growing outside media attention ===
According to Massad, "two major pro-Israeli propagandists," Martin Kramer and Daniel Pipes, began writing "hit pieces" about him, containing the misquotes from the Spectator article. Kramer was an American-Israeli scholar of the Middle East at Shalem College in Jerusalem and a frequent critic of Middle East studies. Pipes was a conservative pundit and founder of the think tank Middle East Forum. He had recently launched Campus Watch, a site that harshly criticized scholars he was ideologically opposed to. On June 20, 2002, Kramer posted an article to his website, calling for Massad's dismissal:

Massad's views are not all that unusual in Middle Eastern studies, and he has every right to express them on Columbia's Low Plaza, in public lectures, and in print. But should someone who is busy propagandizing against the existence of Israel be employed by Columbia to teach the introductory course on the Arab-Israeli conflict? ... Suffice it to say that this column has received a surfeit of student complaints about the course, suggesting that there is no difference between what Massad teaches and what he preaches.

On June 25, Daniel Pipes and Jonathan Schanzer published an article in the Sun, "Extremists on Campus", naming Massad as one such extremist, asserting that he used his class as a "soapbox for anti-Israeli polemics". On September 18, 2002, the Wall Street Journal covered Campus Watch, writing that the site listed eight professors, labeling them as enemies of America and Israel. Two of the eight listed were Massad and Dabashi. Massad claimed that the negative publicity led to him becoming the victim of an identity theft and an e-mail spam campaign and that he started receiving racist emails and death threats.

In January 2003, Massad began writing columns about the Middle East for the Egyptian Al-Ahram Weekly. These columns were often attacked by Kramer and Pipes, and Ariel Beery, a freshman student at Columbia. Beery had his own column in the Spectator. He criticized both Massad's course and the opinions Massad expressed in Al-Ahram:

One would think that we need a teacher in the classroom, not a critic ... The problem lies not in what Massad believes, but in his openly biased presentation in the classroom. The statements he issues are anywhere from questionable to fundamentally wrong. ... If anything, Massad's claim [in his column] that there is no anti-Semitism in the Arab world should disqualify him from setting foot in a Columbia University classroom as a professor of Modern Arab Politics. Just as you would not trust a surgeon with shaky knowledge of the human anatomy, Columbia should not trust the minds of its charges to a professor with a limited knowledge of the body politic of the region he supposedly is an expert in. [Massad also] says that the claim that Israel is democratic is no more than a ‘propagandistic image.’... th[is] ... charge on Israel should again disqualify Massad from teaching at Columbia.

Massad found Beery's criticism odd since he had never taken his course.

From January 24 to 27, MEALAC in collaboration with the Turath undergraduate student club held a Palestinian film festival on Columbia titled "Dreams on a Nation". While the festival was well-visited, some criticized its poster which was a map of Palestine with no internal borders. "This vision of the Middle East endorsed by MEALAC seems to suggest that there will only be peace once Israel ceases to exist," Beery wrote in an op-ed, "MEALAC ... has consistently focused on the Palestinian side of the issue, not legitimately addressing the Israeli-Zionist narrative."

Massad replied to the criticism from Pipes and Kramer in Al-Ahram on March 10:

Kramer, Pipes, and co. are angry that the academy still allows democratic procedure in the expression of political views and has an institutionalised meritocratic system of judgment ... to evaluate its members. Their goal is to destroy any semblance of either in favour of subjecting democracy and academic life to an incendiary jingoism and to the exigencies of the national security state with the express aim of imploding freedom. Their larger success, however, has been in discrediting themselves and in reminding all of us that we should never take the freedoms that we have for granted, as the likes of Kramer and Pipes are working to take them away.

=== "A million Mogadishus" ===
On March 26, at a teach-in protesting the recently launched U.S. invasion of Iraq, assistant professor Nicholas De Genova commented that he wished "a million Mogadishus" on the invading American troops, referencing the humiliating defeat of U.S. troops in the Battle of Mogadishu in 1993, which brought about the end of the U.S. Intervention in Somalia. The comment caused a storm of outrage and Bollinger received a letter signed by 143 members of the House of Representatives and 20,000 e-mails about them.

This prompted Bollinger to appoint a committee to explore the "limits of political expression in the campus environment." Law professor Vincent Blasi would lead the committee and hence it became known as the Blasi committee. The other members of the committee were law professor Michael C. Dorf, business school dean Glenn Hubbard, engineering professor Paul Duby, English professor Kathy Eden, and university chaplain, Jewelnel Davis. According to Blasi, the committee had no mandate to investigate whether departments were "biased or has any particular kind of slant," but it investigated whether "grade retaliation" occurred and whether students had any reason to fear expressing views opposing those of their professors. The committee would meet once a month starting in September.

In another column on April 14 in the Spectator, Beery wrote:

Our educations are bound in intellectual Egypt, enslaved by the post-colonialist slant that has permeated our social sciences, while our institution is trapped by its old-fashioned bylaws into protecting the employment of those who espouse hateful and violent rhetoric... Will President Bollinger and future Provost Alan Brinkley be our gate and our key to a new and better University? Only time will tell. Let's just hope that our time in the wilderness will be short and that next year we will enjoy a rebuilt Columbia.

Massad, who was on a sabbatical, returned to Columbia in the fall of 2003. He held a lecture on October 2, with an unusually large crowd, which included Professor Nicholas Dirks. Massad claimed that after the lecture he was asked a series of rude and hostile questions from students and Sheer, but that he kept his composure.

The David Project met with the pro-Israel student group LionPAC in October and agreed to fund Columbia Unbecoming. Most of the recording of the film was done in December that same year. (Note: According to the ad hoc committee's report: "A version of it appears to have been finished in March or April 2004: on April 16, a press article alluded to the student production of 'a video detailing the campus Middle East wars.'")

On January 6, 2004, Sheer posted a letter to the Hillel site for the university, stating that the "principal anti-Israel voices" on Columbia were the faculty and academic departments. He added:

On the other hand, some faculty members whose teaching style is called ‘advocacy education’ espouse a consistent anti-Israel and pro-Palestinian bias. Their personal politics pervade the classroom and academic forums. The record is public: search under ‘Columbia University’ at websites such as www.campus-watch.org and www.martinkramer.org. Be prepared; it is not a pleasant read.

He repeated the allegation that Massad had said that "the Zionists are the new Nazis": "Professor Massad has reversed the roles of all the players and redefined many of the historic events: the Zionists are the new Nazis; the Palestinians are oppressed victims and therefore the new Jews." He urged students not to take Massad's course and announced the film project that was underway: "A student group, is currently working on a video that records how intimidated students feel by advocacy teaching."

In February, the Blasi committee met with Sheer who was very critical of MEALAC. He claimed that Massad had compared Zionism to Nazism in one of his lectures.

The Blasi committee presented its findings orally to Bollinger in April 2004, after having listened to twenty people, mostly administrators. The committee believed that an investigation into supposedly biased or one-sided curricula jeopardized academic freedom, that there was no evidence of faculty abuse of students, and that there was evidence of a "local problem" in MEALAC. These findings were forwarded to the press by Bollinger, who on May 7 told the New York Daily News that "[t]hey [the Blasi committee] have said to me they have not found claims of bias or intimidation." Thereafter, the committee dissolved.

Auditors began to show up in Massad's spring class and some of them harassed him with hostile ideological questions. He permitted them to do so, but they found no signs of systematic bias against students. Instead, they found "a professor who was constantly harassed by outside agitators" as a small group of unregistered auditors frequently interrupted Massad's class, which disturbed many of the students.

Articles critical of Massad and other MEALAC professors continued to appear in the Sun. On April 18, Jacob Gershman wrote that "Columbia has come under increasing scrutiny for its hiring of anti-Israeli professors, including historian Rashid Khalidi, the Edward Said professor of Arab studies, and Joseph Massad, an assistant professor." Jonathan Calt Harris on May 4 compared Massad to a neo-Nazi and accused him of supporting terrorism against Israel, of believing in a world-wide Jewish conspiracy, and urged the university to deny him tenure. Two days later, Massad received a letter from Joel J. Levy, director of the New York chapter of the Anti-Defamation League, addressed to him, Bollinger and Brinkley. According to a student that had attended Massad's lecture on March 24, Levy wrote, the ideas expressed therein were "anti-Semitic." Massad replied:

My principled stance against anti-Semitism and all kinds of racism is a matter of public record and cannot be assailed by defamatory ‘reports’ or by letters from the ADL that consider them credible sources. Indeed I have condemned anti-Semitism in my Arabic and English writings, regardless of whether the person expressing it was pro-Israel or anti-Israel, an Arab, an American Christian, or an Israeli Jew... I therefore expect a prompt correction of the errors contained in your letter and demand an immediate apology, a copy of which should be sent to President Bollinger.

According to Massad, he never heard back from the ADL.

In September 2004, the Columbia Daily Spectator announced that the Columbia-Barnard chapter of Hillel removed Rabbi Charles Sheer, terminating his 34-year tenure as leader of Columbia's Jewish community, noting that "it was a decision made by the Hillel Board without consulting students or staff, and the reasons for his departure are still unclear."

== Release of Columbia Unbecoming ==
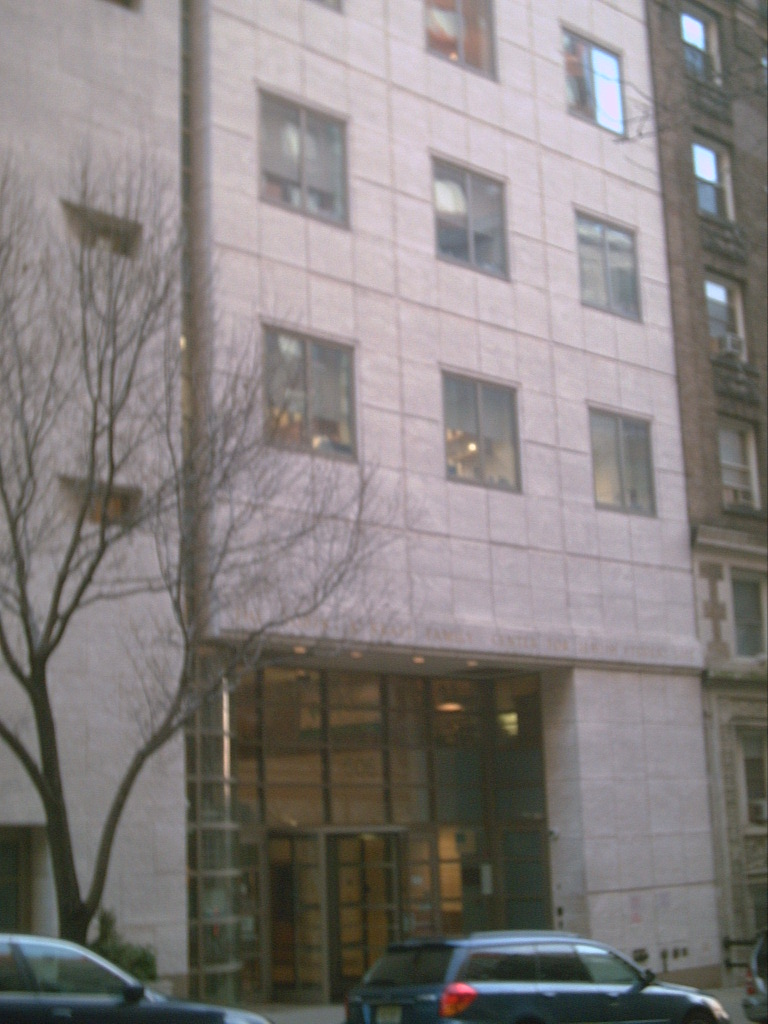
Entrance to the Kraft Center building, where the students were interviewed.

The Sun broke the news about Columbia Unbecoming, on October 20, 2004, announcing that the film had been screened to Barnard College's president, Judith Shapiro, and Brinkley. Initially, two versions of the film existed: one 11-minute-long, and the other a bit over 20 minutes long. (Note: Exactly how long the full-length version was is unknown; the Sun claimed it was 25 minutes long, The Jewish Week 22 minutes, and the New York Daily News 24 minutes.) The film would subsequently be reedited and at least six different versions of the film were created.

The film consisted of testimonies from 14 (Note: The number of students varied depending on the version of the film. In the extended 37-minute version, nine students spoke to the camera including Sheer.) students who felt they had been intimidated or unfairly treated by Massad, Saliba, and Habashi, over their pro-Israel views. The film also featured rabbi Sheer who had helped create it. Six of the fourteen students in the film spoke firsthand of incidents. The three that got the most attention were:

- Tomy Schoenfeld, 27, who wasn't a student in Massad's class, but said that he had attended an off-campus lecture of his in 2002. (Note: In some reports, the lecture is said to have taken place in the spring of 2001.) At the end of the lecture, he posed a question to Massad, prefaced by saying that he was an Israeli, to which Massad replied: "Did you serve in the military?" Schoenfeld answered in the affirmative and Massad asked him: "How many Palestinians have you killed?" Schoenfeld replied: "What? How come it’s relevant to this discussion?" Massad repeated his question: "No, it’s relevant to the discussion, and I demand an answer. How many Palestinians have you killed?" Schoenfeld answered: "I’m not going to answer, but I’m going to ask you a question: How many members of your family celebrated on September 11, if we’re starting with stereotypes?"
- Lindsay Shrier, 24, said that during a 45-minute-long conversation with Saliba on College Walk, he had told her that she couldn't possibly be a Semite because she had green eyes and therefore couldn't claim ancestral ties to Israel: "You have no claim to the land of Israel. You have no voice in this debate. You have green eyes. You're not a Semite. I have brown eyes. I am a Semite."
- Noah Liben, 22, said that during one exchange in Massad's class, he defended Israel and asked Massad if he understood his point. Massad "smirked and said that he didn't" and the class erupted in laughter. He also claimed that Massad, while making the argument that Zionism is a male-dominated movement, incorrectly told students that zion means "penis" in Hebrew. Zion means "designated area or sign post." (Note: These altercations were present in the October 20 version of the film but were later cut out.) Liben also described a girl in his class that had defended Israel's actions. "Before she could get her point across, he quickly demanded and shouted at her, 'I will not have anyone sit through this class and deny Israeli atrocities," he said. The girl later identified herself as Deena Shanker.

Beery also appeared in the film. He didn't air any specific grievances but said that Massad's "favorite description is the Palestinian as the new Jew and the Jew as the new Nazi" and that he called "the Zionists are the new Nazis."

In addition to the interviews, the film displayed quotes from articles written by the professors. The one that stirred the most controversy was lifted from an article called "For a Fistful of Dust: A Passage to Palestine" by Dabashi and published in Al-Ahram: "Half a century of systematic maiming and murdering of another people has left…its deep marks on the faces of the Israeli Jews, the way they talk, walk, the way they greet each other…. There is a vulgarity of character that is bone-deep and structural to the skeletal vertebrae of its culture." According to Dabashi, the quote was taken out of context and the David Project had replaced the words "these people" with "Israeli Jews."

The David Project was criticized for only screening the film to select audiences. In particular, the professors at the center of the controversy were unable see it. It is unclear when the film was eventually released. In 2008, Robin Wilson and Richard Byrne wrote in The Chronicle of Higher Education that the film "never saw general release."

=== Reactions to the film ===
On October 20, the same day the Sun wrote about the film, Massad received a threatening email from a faculty member which he immediately forwarded to Brinkley: "Go back to Arab land where Jew hating is condoned. You are a disgrace and a pathetic typical Arab liar." The day after, United States Representative Anthony Weiner called on Columbia to fire Massad for what he characterized as "anti-Semitic rantings." On October 22, the Sun followed suit.

On October 27, after having watched the film, Bollinger issued a statement about "the disturbing and offensive nature of incidents described in the film" and emphasized the limits to the principle of academic freedom: "It does not, for example, extend to protecting behavior in the classroom that threatens or intimidates students who express their viewpoints." Abraham Foxman, director of the ADL, and New York's mayor, Michael Bloomberg, contacted Bollinger and urged him to take the students' allegations seriously. A colleague of the accused professors at MEALAC, Dan Miron, said he heard stories similar to those presented in the film every week, adding that the atmosphere in his department had "anti-Jewish overtones".

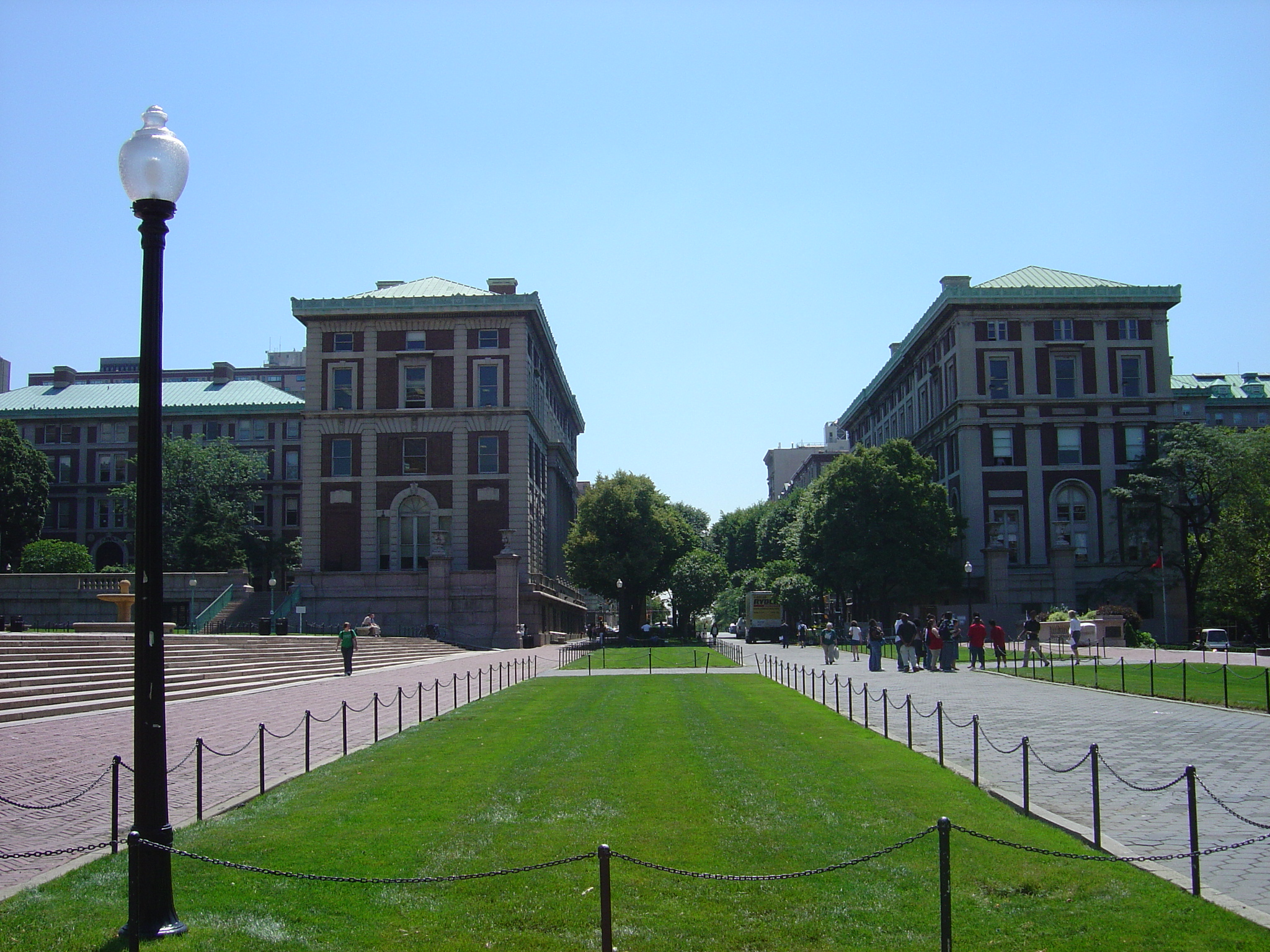
The conversation with Saliba occurred at College Walk according to Shrier.

Saliba defended himself against the accusation from Shrier after having obtained a transcript of the film on November 3 in the Spectator. He wrote that he did not remember the conversation with her but that it was inconceivable that he would have argued the way she claimed that he did. "The statements that she attributes to me in the transcript, marked between quotations, are blatantly false," he wrote, "and I can say in good conscience, and categorically, that I would not have used such phrases." He noted that she got high grades in his class and suggested that she might have misremembered "an argument I sometimes make ... that being born in a specific religion, or converting to one, is not the same as inheriting the color of one’s eyes from one's parents and thus does not produce evidence of land ownership of a specific real estate."

The same day, Massad declared the allegations "the latest salvo in a campaign of intimidation of Jewish and non-Jewish professors who criticize Israel," adding that he had been the target of a three-year-long campaign whose strategy was to equate "criticism of Israel with anti-Semitism." He wrote that he had never met Schoenfeld, and that Liben misremembered the incident he described in Columbia Unbecoming:

Noah [Liben] seems to have forgotten the incident he cites. During a lecture about Israeli state racism against Asian and African Jews, Noah defended these practices on the basis that Asian and African Jews were underdeveloped and lacked Jewish culture, which the Ashkenazi State operatives were teaching them. When I explained to him that, as the assigned readings clarified, these were racist policies, he insisted that these Jews needed to be modernized and the Ashkenazim were helping them by civilizing them. Many students gasped. He asked me if I understood his point. I informed him that I did not.

Noah seems not to have done his reading during the week on gender and Zionism. One of the assigned readings by Israeli scholar and feminist Simona Sharoni spoke of how in Hebrew the word "zayin" means both penis and weapon in a discussion of Israeli militarized masculinity. Noah, seemingly not having read the assigned material, mistook the pronunciation of "zayin" as "Zion," pronounced in Hebrew "tziyon."

As for his spurious claim that I said that "Jews in Nazi Germany were not physically abused or harassed until Kristallnacht in November 1938," Noah must not have been listening carefully. During the discussion of Nazi Germany, we addressed the racist ideology of Nazism, the Nuremberg Laws enacted in 1934, and the institutionalized racism and violence against all facets of Jewish life, all of which preceded the extermination of European Jews. This information was also available to Noah in his readings, had he chosen to consult them. Moreover, the lie that the film propagates claiming that I would equate Israel with Nazi Germany is abhorrent. I have never made such a reprehensible equation.

Massad further claimed that he had a friendly rapport with Liben.

In the evening, Columbia Unbecoming was screened for the first time to a packed audience of 375 students. After the film, Davis moderated a discussion to give students a chance to share their thoughts. One student who stood out was Eric Posner, 25, a major in the MEALAC department, who wore a sandwich board reading: "I served in the Israeli Army. I love Massad." He believed the film was about "a dozen students who are interested in creating a paranoia of anti-Semitism on campus."

On November 11, after delivering a lecture and fielding questions from the audience, Bollinger emphasized his commitment to academic freedom, but would not tolerate "stupid" behavior by faculty members. Meanwhile, in a statement to the Sun, Israeli Minister Nathan Sharansky, who had recently seen the film, told pro-Israel students at Columbia not to be ashamed because "you are representing the people and the state who are the champions of human rights." He alleged that Jewish students preferred to distance themselves from Israel to protect their grades and future careers.

On November 16, the Spectator ran an article by Jacobs and Goldwasser titled "In Defense of The David Project". They claimed that they had never heard of Massad before being invited by students to hear their concerns in October 2003 and that they were "troubled by certain professors who promote a biased education and deny dissenting views in class." The Spectator also ran an article by Bari Weiss who wrote that the accused professors only presented one narrative and were shutting down students who questioned their views.

On November 17, the Sun published a new accusation from Deena Shankar, the girl Liben had spoken about in the film. She claimed to have asked Massad during a lecture if it was true that Israel gives prior warning before launching strikes in Palestinian Arab territories. She said: "That provoked him to start screaming, 'If you're going to deny the atrocities being committed against the Palestinians then you could leave the class,'" adding that Massad also compared Israelis to Nazis in his class. She later told the New York Times that Massad "sometimes ridiculed her questions and during one class exchange yelled at her to get out" but that she stayed.

On November 22, the Sun reported about an e-mail that Dabashi had received from a student who had served in the IDF, criticizing one of his columns in Al-Ahram. Dabashi forwarded the email to Columbia officials, Brinkley, fearing a "potential attack by a militant slanderer" and asked for protection from campus security. Brinkley responded to him that there was "nothing threatening" about the email.

In December, four Jewish students; Aharon Horwitz, (Note: Horwitz' last name was incorrectly spelled "Horowitz" in many media reports.) Daniella Kahane, Bari Weiss, and Ariel Beery, formed the group Columbians for Academic Freedom (CAF). They would speak on behalf of the students claiming to have been intimidated by the professors. The members of CAF, with the exception of Weiss, had themselves featured in Columbia Unbecoming.

In 2008, the Council on American–Islamic Relations (CAIR) stated that "the film, part of a propaganda campaign, smeared professors at Columbia University and alleged they had silenced students who were 'pro-Israel.'"

== Formation of ad hoc committee ==
On December 7, 2004, a group of approximately 50 students, faculty, and others, calling themselves the Ad Hoc Committee for the Defense of Academic Freedom at Columbia, held a press conference to protest what they considered silencing of Israel criticism. According to the Spectator, it was the first organized response to the film by its detractors.

On December 8, Bollinger announced that an ad hoc committee had been appointed which would investigate any grievances the students had but it would not investigate "political or scholarly beliefs" nor review "review departments or curricula." The five members of the committee were Lisa Anderson, Dean of the School of International and Public Affairs; Farah Jasmine Griffin, Professor of English and Comparative Literature; Jean Howard, William E. Ransford Professor of English and Vice Provost for Diversity Initiatives; Ira Katznelson, Ruggles Professor of Political Science and History; and Mark Mazower, Professor of History. In addition, Floyd Abrams, William J. Brennan Visiting Professor at the School of Journalism, would serve as an advisor. Every Monday and Friday the committee would make itself available to hear student grievances.

CAF immediately complained that committee members were predisposed to the accused professors. Howard and Griffin had signed a resolution calling for divestment from Israel in October 2002 and Anderson was Massad's former PhD advisor. Weiss said that she felt scared and that she didn't trust the committee. Some students later announced that they would not participate in any meetings with the committee. Massad questioned the appointment of Abrams as advisor due to his pro-Israel politics and activism.

Bollinger, however, defended the committee members: "Someone can take a position that I strongly disagree with and they can still be ... capable of looking into something like this objectively," adding that it was important to "avoid a witch hunt on one hand and a whitewash on the other." He also remarked that Katznelson had strongly opposed the boycott resolution.

On December 20, Donna Lieberman of the New York Civil Liberties Union (NYCLU) defended the professors in a letter to Bollinger: "It is clear that this controversy would not have acquired the attention it received if it were simply about the rudeness of professors or their intolerance of other points of view." She met with the students who had made the allegations and said that there was "clearly a political agenda" behind them and thought that it was wrong to accept them at face value.

The Foundation for Individual Rights in Education (FIRE) got involved on January 10, 2005, via a letter to Bollinger that served as a reply of sorts to NYCLU's letter. FIRE argued that professors indeed could suffer threats of sanctions and recriminations for the content of their scholarship. FIRE further insinuated that some of the professors were perhaps guilty of indoctrination: "It is obvious that the line between education and indoctrination can sometimes be vague, but in many cases it is quite clear. There are some allegations in this case that, if proven true, would indicate that the line has clearly been crossed at Columbia."

In an interview published on January 19 with New York Magazine, Bollinger faulted Massad for teaching a one-sided view of the Israeli–Palestinian conflict which Massad in his statement to the ad hoc committee a few months later vehemently denied.

== Columbia Unbecoming second screening ==
Columbia Unbecoming was screened a second time at Columbia campus on February 1, 2005 to a crowd of 350 students. The film had been edited since the first screening in November to conceal the identities of some students and to add extra material. After the screening, a debate, moderated by Columbia's Chaplain Jewelnel Davis, was held. During the debate, Weiss defended CAF's decision to put statements written by the professors in Al-Ahram and other publications in the film, "to expose the racism of these professors."

In an interview with the Sun on February 7, Weiss complained that Massad in the course Topics in Asian Civilization spent a disproportionate amount of time talking about Zionism and Israel for a course about the entire Middle East. "In nearly all of his lectures, professor Massad found a way to denounce Israel and the West," she said. A roommate of hers who took the same course by Massad later said that the course unit focused on Palestine lasted no more than two weeks.

On February 11, The Forward ran an article featuring students and faculty saying that the controversy at Columbia was overblown. Biology professor Robert Pollack said that the university was not an anti-Semitic place and asked: "The question is, why am I not believed? Why do people pick the weak film over the strong reality of the place itself?"

On February 18, Greg Lukianoff of the Foundation for Individual Rights in Education (FIRE) wrote about the controversy in the Spectator. He asserted that none of the allegations described in the film constituted either harassment or intimidation, and cautioned against contributing to a situation in which such allegations were used as political weapons to silence the opposition. In his view, the solution was to "let the students and groups slug it out in the realm of classroom debate, campus activism, and public scrutiny."

On February 25, The Forward reported that Rashid Khalidi, a professor at MEALAC, not named in Columbia Unbecoming, had been barred by the New York City Department of Education from taking part in a 12-week program about the Middle East for public school teachers. It was speculated that the decision to ban him was a response to an article in the Sun that mentioned Khalidi's participation in the program and his previous comments about Israel being a racist state with an "apartheid system." Wiener and the American Jewish Committee supported the decision, stating that Khalidi had a "record of brazen, openly biased and distorted statements about Israel." Bollinger rebuked the barring as a violation of First Amendment principles.

In March, a threatening email was sent to all Jewish students and faculty at MEALAC from an Israeli group calling themselves "United Trial Group – Peoples Rights International" informing them that:

We advise you to immediately dismiss/kick ass of Joseph Goebbels, aa [sic (Note: Different sources reproduce this word differently; in Censoring Thought, it is spelled "aa", in We Will Not Be Silenced, "a", and in Academic Freedom and the Teaching of Palestine-Israel, "aka".)] Joseph Massed [sic] based on the President Bush Bill against anti-Semitism and according with the US anti-terrorism law, proscribing Nazi propaganda and incitement to terror. If you and the administration won't immediately dismiss that fascist bastard, you and the administration will be personally liable and accountable for aiding, abetting and harboring this Muslim criminal, and subject to criminal prosecution and multimillion compensations in damages... You have 30 days to comply and inform us.

The right-wing Zionist Organization of America sponsored a day-long conference entitled "The Middle East and Academic Integrity on the American Campus" on March 6 on Columbia. Members of CAF were present, as were Kramer, Weiner, Sharansky, and local New York politicians. There, Weiner asserted that "[t]here is a rise of anti-Semitism that is almost indisputable on college campuses." New York City Council Speaker Gifford Miller, referencing the ad hoc committee's investigation, cautioned that we "will not accept a whitewash." Phyllis Chesler, professor emerita at the College of Staten Island, in a speech enthusiastically received by the crowd, referred to the Palestine Solidarity Movement as "a group in my opinion that’s quite similar to the Ku Klux Klan, or to the Nazi Party". One person in the audience objected to the hostile atmosphere of the conference and said that he had been shot by the Israeli army. "They should have shot you in the head," one man shouted. "Much of what has been said today is not only unproductive, it is counterproductive," Beery said, as he was booed. Beery said that he thought that many of the comments at the conference went too far.

== Ad hoc committee's report ==
After having interviewed 62 students, faculty members, administrators and alumni, and read written submissions from more than 60 others, the ad hoc committee's 24-page-report was released to the press on March 31, 2005.

The report found "no evidence of any statements made by the faculty that could reasonably be construed as anti-Semitic" and "no basis for believing that Professor Massad systematically suppressed dissenting views in his classroom." Instead, it found that Massad had been the target of harassment from pro-Israel students and that outside organizations had attempted to spy on professors. Regarding the three alleged instances of intimidation from the school year 2001 to 2002, it found Shanker's and Schoenfeld's allegations against Massad "credible" and Saliba's version a "good deal more likely" than Shrier's allegation. The report also criticized Columbia's inadequate grievance procedures.

=== Incident with Shanker ===
Shanker described the alleged incident with Massad in his spring 2002 class on Palestinian and Israeli Politics and Societies as follows:

Professor Massad was discussing Israeli incursions into the West Bank and Gaza, but I do not remember exactly what he was saying. I raised my hand and asked if it was true that Israel sometimes gives warning before bombing certain areas and buildings so that people could get out and no one would get hurt. At this, Professor Massad blew up, yelling, "If you're going to deny the atrocities being committed against Palestinians, then you can get out of my classroom!" I don't remember exactly how I responded except saying, I'm not denying anything. I wasn't. But I was so shocked by his reaction that I don't think I said much more than that.

The report deemed Shanker's recount "credible":

Upon extensive deliberation, the committee finds it credible that Professor Massad became angered at a question that he understood to countenance Israeli conduct of which he disapproved, and that he responded heatedly. While we have no reason to believe that Professor Massad intended to expel Ms. Shanker from the classroom (she did not, in fact, leave the class), his rhetorical response to her query exceeded commonly accepted bounds by conveying that her question merited harsh public criticism. Angry criticism directed at a student in class because she disagrees, or appears to disagree, with a faculty member on a matter of substance is not consistent with the obligation "to show respect for the rights of others to hold opinions differing from their own," to exercise "responsible self-discipline," and "to demonstrate appropriate restraint."

The report noted that "the main elements of Ms. Shanker's account" were corroborated by two witnesses, but rejected by three participants in the class who did not recall the incident Shanker described. It further noted that the incident wasn't recorded in the teaching evaluations the committee had investigated.

=== Incident with Schoenfeld ===
Schoenfeld said that he had attended an off-campus lecture with Massad, either in the late fall 2001 or early spring 2002. He described the following interaction with him:

I raised my hand to ask a question, and presented myself as an Israeli student. Professor Massad, in his response, asked me whether I served in the Israeli Military, to which I replied I had been a soldier. Then, to my surprise, Professor Massad asked me, "Well, if you served in the military, then why don't you tell us how many Palestinians have you killed?" I replied by saying that I did not see the relevance of that question to the discussion. Professor Massad, however, insisted, and asked again, "How many Palestinians have you killed?" I did not answer his question, and remained silent. A few minutes later, as my frustration grew, I decided to show Professor Massad how absurd was his response since it was stereotypical in nature. I raised my hand and asked Professor Massad how many members of his family celebrated on September 11th. By asking this question, I wanted to prove that stereotypes are misleading and do not contribute to an academic discussion. Professor Massad was very naturally very upset from my question, and the organizer of the event, at that point, decided to step in and stop the discussion. That is all my recollection from that evening.

While the committee noted that Massad "emphatically claims never to have met Mr. Schoenfeld," it deemed Schoenfeld's recount "credible":

In light of the confirmation of the event by another student and the contemporaneous reporting to a dean, the committee finds it credible that an exchange of this nature did occur at a location adjacent to campus. It is conceivable that Professor Massad did not know that Mr. Schoenfeld was a student.

=== Incident with Shrier ===
The report described Shrier's recount of the alleged incident with Saliba as follows:

Lindsay Shrier was enrolled in Professor George Saliba's Introduction to Islamic Civilization in the fall 2001. She reported being troubled by a video that dealt with the modern Muslim world that she considered to be very one-sided, and she was disturbed by the absence of a post-film class discussion. Ms. Shrier reports that as the class session ended she "approached Professor Saliba with many questions and thoughts that the documentary/video provoked. I started to challenge him on many aspects of the video and question the validity of some of its claims." The discussion, which began inside Schermerhorn Hall, then moved outside to the area in front of Philosophy Hall. "We discussed the history of Jews in Israel …. Saliba told me I had no voice in the debate. I was puzzled by his comment. Then he slowly came towards me, moved down his glasses, looked right into my eyes, and said, "See you have green eyes; you are not a Semite. I am a true Semite. I have brown eyes. You have no claim to the land of Israel."

The report argued that because the only participants in the exchange was Shrier and Saliba, and because Saliba acknowledges that the exchange took place, his version of it was "a good deal more likely":

As these were the only participants in the reported exchange, and as, ultimately, Professor Saliba acknowledges it did likely take place, we find it credible that this conversation did occur and that a reference to eye color was made near its conclusion. But as it is impossible to judge the imputation, and since more than one reading of the statement is viable, we conclude that however regrettable a personal reference might have been, it is a good deal more likely to have been a statement that was integral to an argument about the uses of history and lineage than an act approaching intimidation. A 45-minute conversation outside of class or office hours is not consistent with such an effort at intimidation. Indeed, Ms. Shrier has indicated that she is not entirely sure "exactly what this incident meant."

=== Outside bodies and harassment of professors ===
Outside events, such as the September 11 attacks and the Second Intifada had led to heightened tensions on campus. Massad's spring 2002 class was particularly tense, with one faculty member attempting to spy on it:

Testimony that we received indicated that in February 2002 Professor Massad had good reason to believe that a member of the Columbia faculty was monitoring his teaching and approaching his students, requesting them to provide information on his statements in class as part of a campaign against him.

While many students thought Massad was an excellent teacher, some objected to his "highly charged vocabulary":

A significant number of students found Professor Massad to be an excellent and inspiring teacher, and several described his class as the best they took at Columbia. But even some of the students who found the class valuable noted Professor Massad's repeated deployment of a tendentious and highly charged vocabulary, and some complained about what they felt was his repeated, even unremitting, use of stigmatizing characterizations and his sometimes intemperate response to dissenting views. Some reported that they were deterred from asking questions by the atmosphere this created.

Massad allowed anyone who wanted to comment and raise questions during his lectures. This led to a small group of students being able to disrupt them:

there is ample evidence of his willingness -- as part of a deliberate pedagogical strategy -- to permit anyone who wished to do so to comment or raise a question during his lectures. For many students this approach itself became problematic because it allowed a small but vociferous group of fellow students to disrupt lectures by their incessant questions and comments.

Outside the classroom, Massad was dedicated and respectful to his students:

Outside the classroom, there can be little doubt of Professor Massad's dedication to, and respectful attitude towards, his students whatever their confessional or ethnic background or their political outlook. He made himself available to them in office hours and afterwards. One student, critical of other aspects of his pedagogy, praised his "warmth, dynamism and candor" and his unusual accessibility and friendliness. One of the group of students who questioned him regularly and critically in class told us of their friendly relations outside class where their discussions often continued. A student who has complained that he was mocked in class by Professor Massad in the spring of 2001, was still in email contact with him one year later.

Over the two years following 2002, outside organizations became involved in the surveillance of professors in MEALAC. According to "credible evidence" someone began filming without permission during one of Saliba's spring 2004 lectures but left after being challenged. Such incidents had a negative effect on classroom debate:

The inhibiting effect upon classroom debate was noted by a number of students. One undergraduate in Professor Saliba's class told us that she was afraid to defend her views in the classroom "for fear of attack from students but also from reporters who may continue their investigations of our school undetected." Graduate student teaching assistants reported that they no longer felt able to express their views freely for fear of retribution from outside bodies and that their teaching was affected as a result. Some expressed anxiety about how press attention would affect their job prospects.

The report also noted the appearance of "auditors" in Massad's spring 2004 class.

=== Columbia's grievance procedures ===
The report criticized Columbia's unclear grievance procedures. Students didn't know how to file complaints about faculty and similarly, there was no place for faculty to lodge complaints about students. Another problem was that the policies on who were allowed to attend classes were unclear which allowed unregistered and disruptive auditors to interfere.

=== Reactions to report ===
==== Massad's response ====
Massad criticized the report. In an article in the Electronic Intifada, he argued that "[t]he Ad Hoc Grievance Committee Report suffers from major logical flaws, undefended conclusions, inconsistencies, and clear bias in favor of the witch-hunt that has targeted me for over three years." He found it objectionable that it had deemed Shanker's story "credible" when his testimony about it never having occurred was corroborated by three students, two graduate Teaching Assistants and one registered undergraduate student. That more weight was assigned to her accusation and her witnesses than to his denial and his witnesses. He furthermore denied ever having asked any student to leave his class and wrote that Shanker lied.

Regarding Schoenfeld's allegation, Massad argued that the fact that neither he nor his witness could tell when or where the incident took place should have cast doubt on his allegation. Massad denied ever having met or seen Schoenfeld.

==== CAF responses ====
Horwitz repudiated the report: "The report is insulting, a disgrace to those of us who put our hearts and souls into making Columbia a better place." Beery said the report was "the second strike against Columbia when it comes to students' rights." He called the committee's finding that statements made were not antisemitic "deeply insulting", not because he believed it to be false but because student complaints were about intimidation, rather than racism, according to him.

Weiss questioned the thoroughness of the report and said that it was compiled by a "committee of insiders." She asserted that the report showed that "professors abused their students and disregarded their rights." She stood by her claim that "[t]hese students were intimidated because of their ideological positions, a fact that was willfully neglected in the report."

==== Other responses ====
Pro-Israel advocate Alan Dershowitz, who long had criticized the MEALAC department, said that Bollinger had appointed the wrong people to the committee and that it therefore lacked credibility. An editorial in the New York Times chided the committee for not having examined "the quality and fairness of teaching" of the professors:

But in the end, the report is deeply unsatisfactory because the panel's mandate was so limited. Most student complaints were not really about intimidation, but about allegations of stridently pro-Palestinian, anti-Israeli bias on the part of several professors. The panel had no mandate to examine the quality and fairness of teaching. That leaves the university to follow up on complaints about politicized courses and a lack of scholarly rigor as part of its effort to upgrade the department.

Juan Cole slammed the editorial as "among the more dangerous documents threatening higher education in America to have appeared in a major newspaper since the McCarthy period." He argued that the Times reference to "scholarly rigor" was just a thinly veiled call for academic censorship.

NYCLU in an open letter to Bollinger dated April 6 called the report inadequate. Regarding Shankers account, NYCLU wrote: "Given this conflicting testimony and the absence of contemporaneous corrobation of Ms. Shanker’s account, it is unclear how or why the Committee chose to believe Ms. Shanker and disbelieve Professor Massad." It questioned why the committee hadn't sought out any of the dozens of other students in the class who could have served as witnesses. NYCLU also expressed its dismay over the report's unwillingness to connect the ideological agenda of the David Project and Campus Watch with what transgressed at Columbia.

The New York Daily News on April 10 called for Columbia to fire Massad, calling him a "bully, propagandist and perpetrator of deeply offensive teachings about Jews."

In May, twenty former students in Massad's spring 2002 class wrote to the university, claiming that the incident with Shanker never happened. Fifty faculty members of Columbia wrote an open letter to the university asserting that "neither faculty nor students have a right to be shielded from disagreeable or unfamiliar ideas, the production of which is integral to the mission of the university."

Eric Posner, an undergraduate from Israel, said that "[t]hese individuals are conjuring up notions of anti-Semitism to serve their narrow-minded and extremist political agenda. ... I can’t understand for the life of me why Columbia hasn’t been tougher about dismissing this as a load of garbage." Posner had been working to counter the narrative of the film ever since it first was screened to students in November.

== Aftermath ==
Following the spring semester, the three accused professors all took a leave of absence. Weiss called the professors' leave a "brilliant political move" and she vowed that CAF's work would continue. In addition to the updated grievance procedures, another development at Columbia, phrased in the Spectator as "not unrelated to the controversy" was the creation of an Israeli Studies Chair in the MEALAC Department.

Massad was awarded tenure at Columbia in 2009. The tenuring was denounced by the on-campus pro-Israel group LionPAC. In 2011, Kenneth L. Marcus, founder of the pro-Israeli Brandeis Center, filed a complaint with the Office of Civil Rights against Barnard College, alleging that a Jewish student had been "steered" away from taking a class with Massad. The student in question wasn't eligible for Massad's class and the complaint was dismissed for lack of evidence. In 2019, the pro-Israel Lawfare Project filed a complaint on a student's behalf against Columbia alleging a "culture of discrimination" against Jewish students. The student alleged that, among other things, Massad had voiced support for the Izz al-Din al-Qassam Brigades.

The Columbia student magazine The Blue and White reported in September 2005 that Weiss and Beery were dating. She got an internship and became a journalist at Wall Street Journal following her graduation. Beery and Horwitz became business partners and founded PresenTense Group.

=== As fighting anti-Semitism ===
Weiss, who was one of the key players in the controversy, has described it as a fight against left-wing anti-Semitism. In an article in 2015 in Mosaic Magazine titled "How to Fight Anti-Semitism on Campus", she lamented that Massad had won tenure "despite the sustained and strong opposition of student whistleblowers, concerned alumni, and others". She charged that Massad had turned an "untold numbers of naïve students into unwitting tools of anti-Semitism."

In her 2019 book How to Fight Anti-Semitism, Weiss described the contentious atmosphere during this period as giving her "a front row seat to leftist anti-Semitism" at the university. The activism described by Weiss was alleged by Glenn Greenwald to be "designed to ruin the careers of Arab professors by equating their criticisms of Israel with racism, anti-Semitism, and bullying, and its central demand was that those professors (some of whom lacked tenure) be disciplined for their transgressions." Weiss has called Greenwald's characterizations "baseless", saying that she "advocated for the rights of students to express their viewpoints in the classroom", adding, "I don't know when criticizing professors became out of bounds."

Marcus described the controversy as bringing to light a pattern of anti-Semitic activity at MEALAC.

=== As an assault on academic freedom ===
Several authors characterized the controversy as a smear campaign. Henry Giroux saw it as a battle in "a highly organized campaign of intimidation and an all-out assault on academic freedom, critical scholarship, and the very idea of the university as a place to question and think." Columbia's former provost, Jonathan R. Cole, worried about a growing effort "to pressure universities to monitor classroom discussion, create speech codes, and more generally, enable disgruntled students to savage professors who express ideas they find disagreeable." He contended that the goal of this effort was to treat speech that some find offensive as punishable actions. According to him, the political pressure to silence Edward Said, Khalidi, Massad, and other Middle East studies professors who expressed views critical of Israel, was not unlike the political pressure to include Creationism as an alternative to Darwinism in school curricula.

Ali Abunimah, co-founder of the pro-Palestinian Electronic Intifada, called the controversy a witch hunt against Massad and an attempt by the Israel lobby to silence criticism of Israel.

Steven Salaita, who himself would become the target of an Israel-related controversy in 2016, saw it as an example of American anti-Arab racism.

=== As culture clash ===
Some authors have characterized the visceral reaction of the students to the perceived anti-Israel bias as a culture clash. Rashid Khalidi described it as a consequence of people meeting people with very different ideas. Massad likewise argued that students mistook established scholarship for pro-Palestinian propaganda:

Thus when young American students who come from ideologically charged homes, schools, and environments, attend university classes about the subject, they mistake established scholarship as pro- Palestinian propaganda, a conclusion that is propped up by the likes of Campus Watch, the David Project, and the Anti-Defamation League, all three organisations who make it part or all their business to attack scholarly criticisms of Israeli policy.

Stanford University historian Joel Beinin compared the situation to white students learning about Jim Crow laws:

It is unclear why students' emotional reaction to information or analysis presented in a classroom has any bearing on its factual accuracy or intellectual legitimacy. Undoubtedly many white student supporters of Jim Crow practices at universities throughout the American South in the 1960's were distressed to learn that these practices were illegal and despised by many Americans.
