= Joseph Massad =

Jordanian-American academic and professor (born 1963)

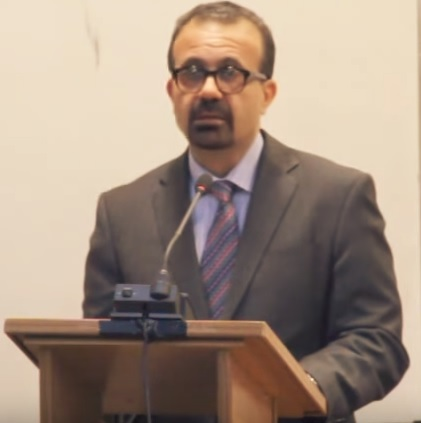
- Joseph Massad speaks at the University of Chile in 2014
- Born: 1963 (age 62–63)
- Education: University of New Mexico (BA, MA); Columbia University (PhD)
- Awards: MESA Malcolm Kerr Dissertation Award 1998, Lionel Trilling Book Award 2008, Scott Nearing Award for Courageous Scholarship 2008
- Scientific career
- Fields: Middle Eastern studies
- Workplaces: Columbia University
- Doctoral advisor: Lisa Anderson

Joseph Andoni Massad (Arabic: جوزيف مسعد; born 1963) is a Jordanian-American academic specializing in Middle Eastern studies, who is Professor of Modern Arab Politics and Intellectual History in the Department of Middle Eastern, South Asian, and African Studies at Columbia University in New York. His academic work has focused on Palestine, Zionism, Sigmund Freud and psychoanalysis, and nationalism, identity, culture, and sexuality in the Arab world.

Massad was born in Jordan in 1963 and is of Palestinian Christian descent. He received his Ph.D. in political science from Columbia University in 1998. He is known for his books The Persistence of the Palestinian Question: Essays on Zionism and the Palestinians and Desiring Arabs, about representations of sexual desire in the Arab world.

== Biography ==
=== Early life ===
Massad was born in Jordan in 1963 to parents who were forcibly displaced with their families from Jaffa, Mandatory Palestine during the 1948 Palestine war. His parents met in Beirut, when his mother was living in the Mousaitbeh neighborhood. His father—passionate about foreign languages and conversant in Italian, French, and English in addition to Arabic—found employment at the British embassy in Amman. His mother worked for the United Nations Relief and Works Agency for some time and was an avid reader.

=== Education ===
==== College De La Salle Frères ====
Joseph studied at the College De La Salle Frères, a Catholic school in Amman operated by the Institute of the Brothers of the Christian Schools, where he studied alongside Muslims and other Christians. His father had studied at their school in Jaffa.

==== University of New Mexico ====
In 1981, he moved the United States to pursue his studies at the University of New Mexico, where he earned a BA and an MA. He began a course of study in engineering. He then decided to pursue political science, a decision he attributes to the politicization he experienced, citing the impact of the Sabra and Shatila massacre, as well as his culture shock as an Arab international student in New Mexico, on his political thinking. Among the books he read around the age of 19 were David Hirst's 1977 book The Gun and the Olive Branch: The Roots of Violence in the Middle East and Edward Said's 1979 book The Palestinian Question. He specialized in Latin America.

==== Columbia University ====
In 1991, he started his doctoral studies at Columbia, where he studied political science, specializing in the Middle East. Massad was profoundly influenced by Edward Said, whom Massad would later consider a mentor and friend. They were in different departments at Columbia—Massad in political science and Said in comparative literature—but Massad enrolled in two courses taught by Said: Culture and Imperialism and Representations of the Intellectual. In 1998, he received his doctorate in political science from Columbia University, and in the fall of 1999 he started teaching as an adjunct professor at the same institution.

== Career ==
Massad has stated that he began facing political pressure as an adjunct professor at Columbia in 2001, with a campaign started by a few students, According to Massad, this pressure intensified from 2002 following articles critical of his views on US foreign policy in the Middle East and the Israeli–Palestinian conflict published in right-wing Zionist publications and tabloids in the aftermath of the September 11 attacks. Following the screenings of The David Project's film Columbia Unbecoming in 2004, there were public calls for his termination from figures such as Anthony Weiner. The Ad Hoc Grievance Committee Report presented to Columbia President Lee Bollinger found "no evidence of any statements made by the faculty that could reasonably be construed as anti-Semitic" and "no basis for believing that Professor Massad systematically suppressed dissenting views in his classroom." Instead, it found that Massad had been the target of harassment from pro-Israel students and that outside organizations had attempted to spy on professors. It found one instance of alleged classroom intimidation from Massad to be "credible," one in which a student recalled asking about Israel sometimes giving a warning before a bombing to minimize casualties, after which the student said the professor said, "If you're going to deny the atrocities being committed against Palestinians, then you can get out of my classroom!"

In the summer of 2009, Massad earned tenure at the university. In June, the New York Post published an op-ed by Jacob Gershman, formerly of the New York Sun, which announced and condemned Massad's tenure. It was also denounced by LionPAC, a pro-Israel student advocacy group at Columbia. In a July 2009 letter to the provost, Claude Steele, 14 professors protested Massad's tenure, citing details that had been published in Gershman's op-ed in the New York Post.

In 2011, attorney Kenneth L. Marcus filed a complaint against Columbia citing Massad with the US Department of Education's Office for Civil Rights (OCR), where Marcus previously worked. The complaint was pursuant to Title VI of the Civil Rights Act of 1964. In response to the complaint, Bollinger said, "the individual complaint appears to relate to academic advising at Barnard College and in no way involves Professor Joseph Massad," and "based on these facts, therefore, it is extremely unfair for professor Massad to be cited in a matter in which he played no part whatsoever." The OCR dismissed the complaint in January 2012.

=== During the Gaza war ===
On 8 October 2023, Massad's piece "Just another battle or the Palestinian war of liberation?" was published in The Electronic Intifada. A petition by a student calling for the "immediate removal of Joseph Massad from Columbia's faculty"—which specifically criticized Massad's use of the words "astonishing," "astounding," and "awesome" in the article, claiming it showed "support for the terrorist organization"—quickly gained attention after it was shared by former US ambassador to Israel David M. Friedman on X, formerly Twitter. Amid the ensuing campaign against Massad, which included death threats including one Massad said was slid under his office door, hundreds of Columbia affiliates signed an October 15 letter calling on Columbia President Minouche Shafik to "unequivocally guarantee his physical safety and his academic freedom as well as those of our University’s faculty and students more broadly." On October 19, Eve M. Troutt Powell, historian and president of the Middle East Studies Association (MESA), and Laurie Brand, chair of MESA's Committee on Academic Freedom, wrote a letter to Shafik expressing concern over the university's failure to defend Massad.

On 17 April 2024, amid campus protests during the Gaza war and the start of the Gaza Solidarity Encampment, the US House Committee on Education and Workforce held a hearing on antisemitism in which US congressmen and congresswomen questioned a panel of Columbia leaders, including Minouche Shafik, university president (2023–2024); David Greenwald and Claire Shipman, co-chairs of the Trustees of Columbia University; and David Schizer, a co-chair of Columbia's Task Force on Antisemitism. Representative Tim Walberg (R-MI) focused on Massad and asked Shipman and Greenwald whether they would hypothetically approve tenure for Massad at that moment if they were on the faculty committee that decided tenure. When they said they would not, Walberg retorted " Then why is he still in the classroom?" Representative Lori Chavez-DeRemer (R-OR) returned to the topic of Massad and asked again why he had not been fired. Shafik said that there were certain situations in which tenured professors could be fired and noted that Massad’s conduct was still under investigation. Representative Elise Stefanik (R-NY) also returned to the topic of Massad and asked Shafik to clarify whether Massad was chair of the Faculty of Arts and Sciences academic review committee at the time and asked Shafik if she would make the commitment to remove him from the chair. Shafik said he was under investigation and acquiesced to Stefanik.

In an email to The New York Times, Massad accused Walberg of distorting his writing and said it was "news to me" that he was under investigation. In response to Columbia's testimony, Irene Mulvey, national president of the American Association of University Professors, said "President Shafik threw academic freedom and Columbia University faculty under the bus." The Electronic Intifada published a statement from Massad in which he wrote:

The members of Congress who interrogated President Shafik deliberately misrepresented my article published on 8 October 2023, when Representative Walberg claimed that I "prais[ed] ‘the innovative Palestinian resistance,’ for attacking Israel and glorifying Hamas’s slaughter of nearly 1200 Jews as, and I quote again, 'awesome, astonishing, astounding and incredible.'" I certainly said nothing of the sort.

== Colonial Effects (2001) ==
Massad's first book, Colonial Effects: The Making of National Identity in Jordan, was published in 2001 by Columbia University Press. The book is based on Massad's PhD dissertation, which won the Middle East Studies Association Malcolm Kerr Dissertation Award in 1998.

Over the course of a detailed history of the Jordanian state, from its inception in 1921 to 2000, he argues that state institutions are central to the fashioning of national identity. Massad focuses on institutions of law, the military, and education as key components of nationalism, and elaborates on the production not only of national identity but also of national culture including food, clothes, sports, accents, songs, and television serials.

Colonial Effects was critically praised both by several senior academics in Middle East Studies, including Edward Said who described the book as "a work of genuine brilliance," and by scholars of nationalism such as Partha Chatterjee, Amr Sabet, and Stephen Howe, the last of whom called the book "among the most sophisticated and impressive products" of recent studies in the field. The book was extensively reviewed in academic journals and, according to Betty Anderson, one of the book's reviewers, it has become staple reading on syllabi of nationalism and Middle East politics university courses across the United States and Europe.

John Chalcraft of the University of Edinburgh described Massad's analysis of the impact of colonial subjection on modern Jordanian nationalism as "a major contribution to the literature on Jordanian nationalism, anticolonial nationalism, and the wider field of postcolonial studies;" he also criticizes the paucity of information Massad offers on how "the mass of the population [who] barely get a mention in Massad's account," fared in this history: he finds that in Massad's account "there is an impression that one, white, male, colonial subject is privileged with potency, whereas the agency of others is effaced. For the colonizer, one theory of the subject, for the colonized, another."

== The Persistence of the Palestinian Question (2006) ==
The Persistence of the Palestinian Question: Essays on Zionism and the Palestinians, Massad's second book, was published in 2006 by Routledge.

The Persistence of the Palestinian Question analyzes Zionism and Palestinian nationalism from a variety of angles, including race, gender, culture, ethnicity, colonialism, antisemitism, and nationalist ideology. Massad's analysis of the discourse on terrorism in the introduction deals with the dynamics of power relations between Zionism and the Palestinians and traces the history of Zionist and Israeli violence which the British called "terrorism" in Palestine before 1948 and after, while his title chapter on the persistence of the Palestinian question argues that the Palestinian and the Jewish questions are one and the same and that "both questions can only be resolved by the negation of anti-Semitism, which still plagues much of Europe and America and which mobilizes Zionism's own hatred of Jewish Jews and of the Palestinians."

The book has received praise from scholars Ilan Pappé and Ella Shohat as well as from Palestinian historian Walid Khalidi. Shohat praised the book as a "timely and engaging volume" that "makes an invaluable contribution to the ongoing debate over Zionism and Palestine." Pappé saw the book as a "courageous intellectual exercise" and as "a thought provoking book that forces us to reverse our conventional images and perceptions about Palestine's history and future." Political scientist Anne Norton praised the book as "profoundly illuminating not only for the history of Palestine and the discourses surrounding it, but for the history of Europe and the United States."

In his review in Nations and Nationalism, Israeli scholar Ephraim Nimni wrote:

like his intellectual mentor, Massad reminds us of a long and honourable tradition of Jewish Intellectuals who could only envisage the solution to the Jewish Question through universal emancipation. It seems that Massad, and the late Edward Said, are existential Diaspora Jews of the old kind ... The book is also fastidiously referenced, showing the erudition of the author and his command of the voluminous Israeli and Palestinian literature as well as the classics of Jewish history.

== Desiring Arabs (2007) ==
Massad's third book, Desiring Arabs, was published in 2007 by the University of Chicago Press. Desiring Arabs won Columbia University's 2008 Lionel Trilling Book Award, awarded by a jury of students on the grounds that it "offers a probing study of representations of Arab sexuality" and is "an important and eloquent work of scholarship that the committee feels will have a lasting impact on the field."

Desiring Arabs is an intellectual history of the Arab world and its Western representations in the nineteenth and twentieth centuries. The book makes contributions to a number of academic and theoretical fields. It extends Said's study of Orientalism by analyzing the latter's impact on Arab intellectual production; it links Orientalism to definitions and representations of sex and desire and in doing so provides a colonial archive to the sexual question that has hitherto been missing; it approaches the literary as the limits of imagining the future; and puts forth the question of translation as a central problem in Euro-American studies of the other.

Massad argues that "Western male white-dominated" gay activists, under the umbrella of what he terms the "Gay International," have engaged in a "missionary" effort to impose the binary categories of heterosexual/homosexual into cultures where no such subjectivities exist, and that these activists in fact ultimately replicate in these cultures the very structures they challenge in their own home countries. Massad writes that

The categories gay and lesbian are not universal at all and can only be universalized by the epistemic, ethical, and political violence unleashed on the rest of the world by the very international human rights advocates whose aim is to defend the very people their intervention is creating.

=== Reviews ===
In her review of Desiring Arabs in the Arab Studies Journal, feminist scholar Marnia Lazreg, a professor of sociology at CUNY, wrote, "This truly monumental book is a corrective to Michel Foucault's History of Sexuality that inexplicably omitted the role played by the cultural effects of colonial systems on conceptions and constructions of sexuality ... [Desiring Arabs] is an epoch-making book". Khaled El-Rouayheb of Harvard University called the book "a pioneering work on a very timely yet frustratingly neglected topic. ... I know of no other study that can even begin to compare with the detail and scope of [this] work."

Samia Mehrez, a professor of Arabic Literature at the American University in Cairo writes in the Journal of Gender Studies:

Desiring Arabs by Joseph Massad is an impressive project that ventures into uncharted territory and can be read as a complement to both Edward Said's Orientalism and Michel Foucault's work on sexuality. Like all of Massad's work, Desiring Arabs investigates the discursive and institutional continuum through which culture is 'invented' under both colonial rule through colonial practices that sought to reify racial and religious differences as well as through the cultural politics of the post-colonial nation state and its efforts to consolidate the nation, national identity, and national belonging.

Ferial Ghazoul in the Journal of Arabic Literature, writes:

Massad's interdisciplinary approach, dense prose, impeccable research, and above all the thought-provoking issues he raises make his book a scholarly landmark ... As a student of the late Edward W. Said and as Desiring Arabs was dedicated to Said ..., Massad has certainly learned the lessons of Said, his critical innovation, his scholarly meticulousness, and his virtuoso style.

While there has been a clear consensus on the book's significant scholarly contributions, some of the book's theses have been criticized by Rayyan Al-Shawaf, a freelance writer and reviewer living in Beirut, who concedes that Massad makes a few good points, but observes that "Massad's relativism – stemming from his accurate observation that 'homosexuality' is alien to Arab same-gender sexual traditions – is so extreme that he refuses to support a call for universal freedom of sexual identity." Al-Shawaf argues that,

In postulating the inevitability of (heterosexual) Arab violence wherever there is gay and lesbian assertiveness, Massad pre-emptively exonerates the perpetrators – whether individuals or the state – of any wrongdoing. However regrettable their behaviour, those Arabs who react violently to the gay rights campaign are not perceived by Massad as responsible for their actions, but as caught up in a broader struggle against 'imperialism', to which the gay rights movement is wedded.

Brian Whitaker criticized Massad for, in his view, repeating a common view of Arab nationalists and Islamists which essentially believes LGBT+ activism or identities are the result of a conspiracy by Western forces imposing themselves into Arab or Muslim societies. Massad ascribes this to Orientalist, colonial impulses, but Whitaker notes he cites no evidence of such motives, or a supposed excessive attention by what Massad calls the "Gay International" (LGBT+ rights groups) and human rights organizations on such societies. He is also critical of Massad seeming to present "the West" as a unified entity on such matters, ignoring opposition within Western countries toward LGBT+ acceptance or rights. Whitaker concludes Massad is blinded by his focus on these alleged forces which causes him to ascribe such pernicious influence as the cause of LGBT+ issues being raised in the Arab and Muslim world, rather than as the outgrowth of a wider social movement as a whole, following naturally from greater global communication. Massad is faulted as ignoring evidence of Arab and Muslim people adopting LGBT+ identities themselves, along with dismissing or downplaying repression they suffer from their governments.

== Islam in Liberalism (2015) ==
Islam in Liberalism is Joseph Massad's fourth book, published by University of Chicago Press in 2015. An article published by the Los Angeles Review of Books states that the thesis of the book is that "American and European missionaries of liberalism are trying to proselytize Muslims – and the entire world writ large – to the only sane system of values that exists on the planet: those of Western liberalism". The book deals with the "instrumentalization of Islam in the West" and responds to critiques of his earlier book Desiring Arabs.

== Political views ==
=== On antisemitism ===
Following arguments made by Edward Said in his 1978 book Orientalism, Massad asserts that 19th century European antisemitic characterizations of Jews have transformed in the present era to target Arabs while maintaining the same racialist characterizations. Thus, racism towards Arabs and Muslims today is a form of "Euro-American Christian anti-Semitism and ... Israeli Jewish anti-Semitism." Massad bases this belief on an understanding of antisemitism as a specific historical phenomenon originating in Europe, rather than simply as hatred of Jews; he writes: "the claims made by many nowadays that any manifestation of hatred against Jews in any geographic location on Earth and in any historical period is 'anti-Semitism' smack of a gross misunderstanding of the European history of anti-Semitism."

=== On Israel and Zionism ===
Massad argues that Israel is a racist Jewish state. He argues that Zionism is not only racist but antisemitic, and antisemitic not only towards Arab Palestinians but also towards Jews. Massad writes that after Europeans invented the racialist conception of the "Semite," the Zionist movement "adopted wholesale anti-Semitic ideologies," and describes Zionism as an "anti-Semitic project of destroying Jewish cultures and languages in the diaspora," which has ultimately led to "the transformation of the Jew into the anti-Semite, and the Palestinian into the Jew." Massad further accuses Zionists of unjustly "appropriating the fruit of the land that Palestinian peasants produced," and specifies the renaming of "Palestinian rural salad (now known in New York delis as Israeli salad)" as an example of Israeli racism.

Massad has spoken of genetic links being established between 19th-century European Jews and the ancient Israelite kingdom and the creation of a "Semitic" identity for Jews at that time as actually a European, racist construction designed to portray European Jews as foreigners. Massad considers claims to Israel made by the Zionist movement based on that connection to be problematic. In a debate with Israeli historian Benny Morris, Massad said:

The claim made by the Zionists, and by Professor Morris, that late nineteenth-century European Jews are direct descendants of the ancient Palestinian Hebrews is what is preposterous here. This kind of anti-Semitic claim that European Jews were not European that was propagated by the racist and biological discourses on the nineteenth century, that they somehow descend from first-century Hebrews, despite the fact that they look like other Europeans, that they speak European languages, is what is absurd.

In an interview with Ejaz Haider of Lahore University, Massad said that "the idea that European Jews are somehow direct descendants of the Ancient Hebrews is, of course, a bogus claim". He asserted that only Palestinians have heritage from the Ancient Israelites, saying "It is strange that the only people in that region, Palestinians, are unable to claim the Ancient Hebrews as their ancestors because some strange European group is claiming them as their ancestors".

=== On the United States ===
Massad was especially critical of "rabidly pro-Israeli American President Obama."

Massad views U.S. culture as deeply infected with racism and misogyny, tying the Abner Louima case to torture in Abu Ghraib, and arguing that in Iraq, "American male sexual prowess, usually reserved for American women, [was] put to military use in imperial conquests", with "Iraqis ... posited.. as women and feminised men to be penetrated by the missiles and bombs ejected from American warplanes." Massad concludes that "the content of the word 'freedom' that American politicians and propagandists want to impose on the rest of the world is nothing more and nothing less than America's violent domination, racism, torture, sexual humiliation, and the rest of it."

Massad has also criticized Arab intellectuals who "defend the racist and barbaric policies" of the United States, the International Monetary Fund, and the World Bank in the Arab world.

=== On the Palestinian Authority and Hamas ===
Massad refers to the Palestinian Authority (PA) as the "Palestinian Collaborationist Authority", calls Mahmoud Abbas the "chief Palestinian collaborator", and accuses the PA of collaborating with Israel and the United States to crush Palestinian resistance. In October 2023, Massad wrote an essay in Electronic Intifada on the October 7 attacks in which he called the attacks as "awesome", "astounding", and "incredible" and that they were a "stunning victory". This essay was characterized by the Jerusalem Post, Business Insider, the Anti-Defamation League, and The New Arab as supporting the attacks, and led to a petition to Columbia to remove him from his post that was signed by over 50,000 people. He was defended by the Middle East Studies Association. In a hearing before the House Committee on Education and the Workforce in April 2024, the president of Columbia University said that Massad was "spoken to" regarding this essay but that he was not disciplined.

== Campaign following the David Project's Columbia Unbecoming short film ==
In 2004, a group of pro-Israel students at Columbia, along with the pro-Israel campus group The David Project, produced the film Columbia Unbecoming about three professors some students and faculty thought were biased against Israel. The film focused primarily on Joseph Massad, who taught the course Palestinian and Israeli Politics and Societies. Pro-Israel pundits called for Columbia to fire him as they saw him as unfit to teach. Critics of the film called the film "propaganda" and described it as part of a "smear campaign" against professors critical of Israel.

The film featured interviews with students who claimed that he and other Columbia professors had intimidated or been unfair to them for their pro-Israel views. This led to the appointment of a committee by the university to investigate the complaints. In response to the film, United States Representative Anthony Weiner called on Columbia to fire Massad for what Weiner characterized as "anti-Semitic rantings."

The committee concluded its work in spring 2005, dismissed most of the allegations against Massad and the other professors, writing in its report that it had "no basis for believing that Professor Massad systematically suppressed dissenting views in his classroom" and stated that they "found no evidence of any statements made by the faculty that could reasonably be construed as anti-semitic." The committee found it "credible" that Massad was angered by a question in class from a student that he understood to be defending Israel's conduct toward Palestinians and that his response "exceeded commonly accepted bounds by conveying that her question merited harsh public criticism", but it also described an environment of incivility, with pro-Israel students disrupting lectures on Middle Eastern studies. Critics described the committee's findings as a whitewash.

Massad too criticized the findings, writing that it "suffer[ed] from major logical flaws, undefended conclusions, inconsistencies, and clear bias in favor of the witch-hunt that has targeted me for over three years". Massad continued to deny the one allegation that the report found "credible." Two students beside his accuser said that they witnessed the incident, but a teaching assistant said on WNYC in April 2005 that she was present and that Massad did not angrily criticize the student in question; after the release of the report, 20 students signed a letter stating that they were in class on the day of the alleged incident, and that the incident had never happened.

In an editorial discussing the case one week after the release of the Committee report, the New York Times noted that, while it believed Massad had been guilty of inappropriate behavior, it found the controversy overblown and professors such as Massad themselves victimized:

There is no evidence that anyone's grade suffered for challenging the pro-Palestinian views of any teacher or that any professors made anti-Semitic statements. The professors who were targeted have legitimate complaints themselves. Their classes were infiltrated by hecklers and surreptitious monitors, and they received hate mail and death threats.

== Review of Ankori's Palestinian Art and threat of libel suit in English courts ==
In the Fall 2007 issue of Art Journal, Joseph Massad published "Permission to paint: Palestinian art and the colonial encounter," a review of Israeli professor Gannit Ankori's 2006 book Palestinian Art, Palestinian artist and art historian Kamal Boullata's 2000 book Recovery of Place (استحضار المكان [Istiḥḍār al-Makān]), and Palestinian artist Samia Halaby's 2001 book Liberation Art of Palestine. In his review, Massad accused Ankori of illegitimately appropriating the work of Kamal Boullata. According to Adila Laïdi-Hanieh, these accusations were also made within Palestinian art circles, including the League of Palestinian Artists, as well as international Arab media. Ankori viewed Massad's charge as defamatory. Ankori threatened to sue for defamation in English courts, a practice critics call 'libel tourism,' as "libel defendants nearly always lose" there.

In order to avoid the libel suit, the College Art Association of America (CAA), which publishes Art Journal, agreed to issue an apology to Ankori, to pay her $75,000, and to send a letter to its institutional subscribers, stating that the Massad review "contained factual errors and certain unfounded assertions." Massad acknowledged "minor errors", but not libel, and accused the CAA of cowardice. CAA executive director Linda Downs told The Forward that, while "there were mistakes" in the review, the journal agreed to pay only because it could not afford to fight out the case.

== Books ==
- Massad, Joseph A. (15 October 2001). Colonial effects: the making of national identity in Jordan. New York, NY: Columbia University Press. ISBN 0-231-12322-1. LCCN 2001028017.
- Massad, Joseph A. (2006). The Persistence of the Palestinian Question: Essays on Zionism and the Palestinians. London: Routledge. ISBN 0-415-77010-6.
- Massad, Joseph A. (15 June 2007). Desiring Arabs. Chicago, IL: University of Chicago Press. ISBN 9780226509587.
- Massad, Joseph A. (1 January 2015). Islam in Liberalism. Chicago, IL: University of Chicago Press.
