= Jonathan Calt Harris =

Jonathan Calt Harris (born December 27, 1969) a native of Illinois, is an American Christian Zionist, writer, and a foreign policy analyst. From 2008 to 2016, he served as an assistant director of Policy & Government Affairs at AIPAC, the American Israel Public Affairs Committee in Washington, DC.

== Education ==
Harris graduated from the University of Illinois in 1998 in History and attended graduate school at the Hebrew University of Jerusalem in Religious Studies, living in Israel for the first half of 1996 as an undergrad, and from October 1998 to July 2000 as a graduate student. Harris does not claim a graduate degree.

=== Journalism ===
Harris worked for Time magazine in Jerusalem from 1998–2000, and as a reporter in New York City for much of 2001. Harris worked as a researcher and occasional contributor for Time magazine’s Jerusalem bureau while in graduate school.

Harris' articles on academia and Middle East studies have appeared in National Review Online, The Washington Times, The New York Post, the Middle East Quarterly and various conservative online sources.

=== Campus Watch ===
Harris served as the managing editor of Campus Watch, a website which monitors U.S. universities backed by a pro-Israel think tank, from October 2002 through May 2004. Harris continued to write and edit for Campus Watch until registering as a lobbyist in January 2005.

Through Campus Watch, Harris published several highly critical profiles of individual academics including Sarah Lawrence scholar Fawaz Gerges, Columbia University's Rashid Khalidi, whom he called "Arafat's minion", Joseph Massad, whom he compared to a neo-Nazi and of belittling the Holocaust, and the University of Michigan's Juan Cole, whom he has called "anti-Israel to the point of being an anti-Semitic conspiracy theorist." The academic Middle East Studies Association of America, then headed by Cole, was the subject of several pieces, with Calt Harris referring to it as "once respectable group of scholars which has now become a hive of academic opposition of America, Israel, and...rationalism."

=== Advocacy ===
Jonathan Calt Harris did not publish under a by-line while serving as an in-house Washington lobbyist for the right-wing Zionist Organization of America. He was registered with the government from 2005–2007 as the ZOA's Assistant Director of Government Relations.

Harris left ZOA in March 2007. He was executive director of the Michigan chapter of StandWithUs, and based in Metro Detroit from April 2007 to April 2008. In September 2007, he was interviewed by the Detroit Jewish News, where he also published several editorials on the Pluto Press controversy at the University of Michigan.

Harris, through StandWithUs, organized a coalition of local community organizations that successfully lobbied for the termination or justification of the unique UM Press contract with the UK's Pluto Press. The University of Michigan announced in June 2008 the cancellation of the distribution contract with Pluto Press. A June 13, 2008 statement released to the coalition members declared, "After careful examination, the UM Press Executive Board determined that the Pluto Press mission and procedures are not reasonably similar to UM Press as specified by the guidelines and therefore do not meet the requirements to continue as a distribution client. As a result the contract was terminated, effective December 31, 2008."

Harris has written on Christian Zionism for the Jewish Policy Center and was profiled in the Decatur Herald & Review in late 2008.

== See also ==
- Campus Watch
- StandWithUs
- Daniel Pipes
- Martin Kramer
- Middle East Forum
- Christian Zionism
