= Steven Salaita hiring controversy =

Academic freedom controversy in the U.S.

The Steven Salaita hiring controversy was a 2010s controversy about an American professor who was un-hired (Note: The court ruled that at the time Salaita's job offer was rescinded, he was already employed. Thus "un-hired".) by the University of Illinois Urbana-Champaign following a campaign by pro-Israel students, faculty and donors who contended that his tweets protesting Israel's bombardment of Gaza were antisemitic. The un-hiring sparked a debate about academic freedom in relation to the Israeli–Palestinian conflict, social media, and the influence of pro-Israel lobby groups on American universities. The professor who was denied the job successfully litigated against the university and was awarded a settlement of $875,000, while the university's Chancellor Phyllis Wise resigned.

== Background ==
Steven Salaita, of Palestinian and Jordanian ancestry, was a tenured associate professor of English at Virginia Tech. Salaita studied and wrote about immigration, indigenous peoples, dislocation, race, ethnicity and multi-culturalism. Salaita had written two books about the Middle East; Israel's Dead Soul and The Uncultured Wars, Arabs, Muslims and the Poverty of Liberal Thought as well as contributed articles to left-leaning or pro-Palestinian sites such as Salon and The Electronic Intifada. He was also a prominent campaigner for the American Studies Association's boycott of Israel.

Michael Hiltzik in Los Angeles Times referred to him as a "respected scholar in American Indian studies and Israeli–Arab relations."

== Job offer ==
In 2012 the American Indian Studies Program at the University of Illinois Urbana-Champaign (AIS) began the process of hiring a scholar to serve at the assistant or associate professor level at the department. There were 80 applicants for the position and Salaita was one of six invited to campus. He visited the campus in February 2013 and was the faculty's unanimous choice. Robert Allen Warrior, AIS director, wrote that Salaita's "fresh and compelling contributions to the intellectual project of a critique of the concept of indigeneity, which is ... the core of what has made us an international leader in our field." Reginald Alston, associate chancellor, wrote of Salaita's candidacy: "The uniqueness of his scholarship on the intersection of American Indian, Palestinian, and American Palestinian experiences presents a rare opportunity to add an esoteric perspective on indigeneity ... I support offering Dr. Salaita a tenured position."

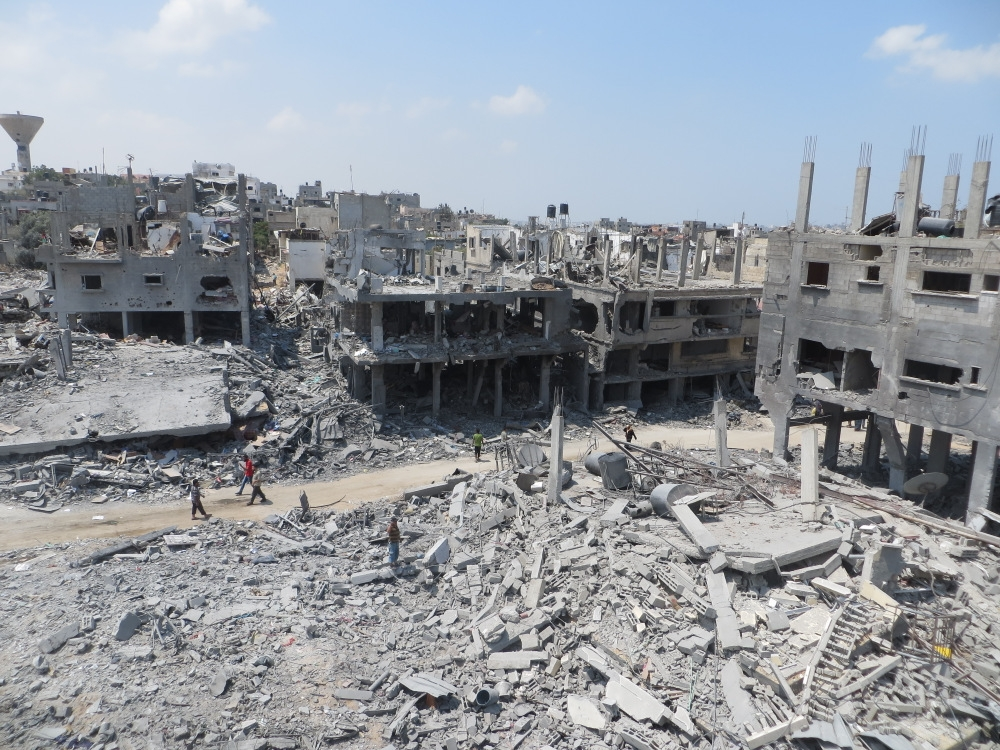
Ruins of a residential area in Beit Hanoun, Gaza.

On October 3, 2013, the university conditionally offered Salaita a job as associate professor with indefinite tenure in the American Indian Studies Program scheduled to begin in January 2014. He accepted, but with a projected start date of August 16, 2014. In July 2014, the Gaza war broke out, a major conflict between Israel and Hamas, during which over 2,000 Palestinians were killed and Israel was condemned by human rights organizations. Salaita tweeted hundreds of tweets about the war during the summer, among them a handful that were brought to the university's attention:

- "You may be too refined to say it, but I'm not: I wish all the fucking West Bank settlers would go missing."
- "Let's cut to the chase: If you're defending #Israel right now you're an awful human being." (July 9)
- "This is not a conflict between Israel and Hamas. It's a struggle by an indigenous people against colonial power." (July 17)
- "The logic of 'antisemitism' deployed by Zionists, if applied in principle, would make pretty much everybody not a sociopath 'antisemitic'. (July 17)
- "If it's 'antisemitic' to deplore colonisation, land theft, and child murder, then what choice does any person of conscience have?" (July 20)
- "Zionists: transforming 'anti-semitism' from something horrible into something honorable since 1948." (July 20)
- "I repeat: if you're defending Israel right now, then 'hopelessly brainwashed' is your best prognosis." (July 20)
- "At this point, if Netanyahu appeared on TV with a necklace made from the teeth of Palestinian children, would anybody be surprised?" (July 20)
- "#Israel's bombardment of #Gaza provides a necessary impetus to reflect on the genocides that accompanied the formation of the United States." (July 20)

In a statement following the vote by University of Illinois trustees, Salaita stated that he was disappointed the trustees had ignored the following "less-notorious tweet":

- "I refuse to conceptualise Israel / Palestine as Jewish-Arab acrimony. I am in solidarity with many Jews and in disagreement with many Arabs." (July 27)

== Media controversy and complaints ==
Salaita's tweets attracted media attention. First by William A. Jacobson on July 19 who, referring to his tweets, wrote "[t]witter has opened a window into the soul of the anti-Israel boycott movement." The Daily Caller followed suit on July 21, writing that "[t]he University of Illinois at Urbana-Champaign has continued its bizarre quest to employ as many disgusting scumbags as possible by acquiring the services of Steven Salaita, a leading light in the movement among similarly obscure academics to boycott Israel." On July 22, The News-Gazette in Champaign–Urbana wrote about him. Its request for an interview was turned down by Salaita who responded "[a]s I'm in the middle of moving, I'm a bit preoccupied at the moment," apparently unaware of brewing controversy.

Some days later, university Chancellor Phyllis Wise became aware of the controversy and on July 23, she discussed with colleagues over email how to proceed. The next day, Wise discussed the situation in a closed session with the university's board of trustees. Anand Swaminathan, who would later represent Salaita in legal proceeding against the university, believed that the decision to rescind the job offer was taken in that meeting.

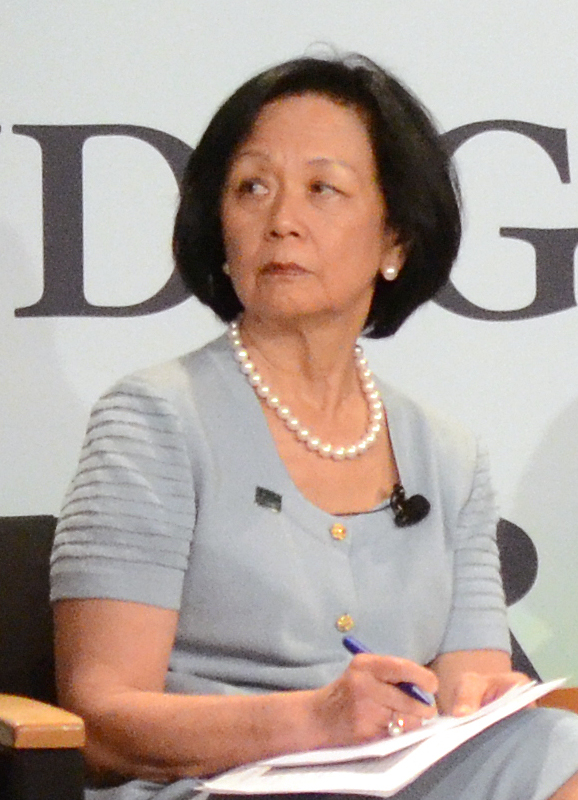
Phyllis Wise at the APLU 150th Year Anniversary

On July 31, Wise wrote that she feared the situation would lead to a court battle with Salaita: "It will be the beginning of a lawsuit, I am sure I will be deposed no matter who sends the letter."

The next day, she and vice president Christophe Pierre wrote to Salaita informing him that they had decided not to present his potential appointment to the board of trustees because it was "unlikely" to win their approval, effectively rescinding his job offer. At that point, both Salaita and his wife had already quit their jobs and were preparing to move to Illinois.

During these days, Wise received hundreds of letters from university alumni, students, parents of students and members of Champaign-Urbana's Jewish community. Some characterized Salaita's tweets as anti-Semitic while others characterized them as simply vulgar. Several of the letters threatened to stop donating: "Having been a multiple 6 figure donor to Illinois over the years, I know our support is ending as we vehemently disagree with the approach this individual espouses." An unknown donor met with Wise and provided her with a two-page memo about the situation. Wise destroyed the memo (see below), but according to her the donor told her that "how we [the university] handle the situation will be very telling." Another particularly wealthy donor wanted to "share his thoughts about the University’s hiring of Professor Salaita" with Wise. She, however, insisted that the deluge of emails had nothing to do with the decision not to hire Salaita.

== Job offer withdrawal ==
In a statement released on August 22, 2014, Wise wrote:

A pre-eminent university must always be a home for difficult discussions and for the teaching of diverse ideas. One of our core missions is to welcome and encourage differing perspectives. Robust--and even intense and provocative--debate and disagreement are deeply valued and critical to the success of our university....What we cannot and will not tolerate at the University of Illinois are personal and disrespectful words or actions that demean and abuse either viewpoints themselves or those who express them.

On September 10, the trustees voted down a proposal to reconsider his offer of employment, and on September 11, they voted 8-1 to support Wise's decision to reject Salaita. Salaita maintained that the decision violated academic freedom and insisted that the university would reinstate his job offer.

Salaita rejected the accusations of anti-Semitism in an interview with The Jewish Daily Forward, saying that he was "deeply opposed to all forms of bigotry and racism including anti-Semitism." He added that he was the victim of a smear campaign by "wealthy and well organized groups" who "attack pro-Palestinian students and faculty".

== Reactions ==
The un-hiring of Salaita outraged a large number of American academics who felt that his right to academic freedom had been trampled on. The incident attracted widespread attention on many campuses because it touched on the limits of academic freedom regarding the Israel–Palestinian conflict.

In September a group of almost 330 professors from the university and the nearby University of Illinois signed an open letter demanding Salaita's reinstatement,. About 40 Jewish students, faculty, staff and alumni protested Salaita's non-hiring in another letter which alleged that he was the victim of "the Israeli attack on Palestine coming to our campus."

But Wise also received a "Letter of confidence and support for Chancellor Wise" signed by over 260 signatories. (Note: The number grew to almost 400 during the following months.) Cary Nelson, professor emeritus at the university and president of the American Association of University Professors (AAUP) from 2006 to 2012, defended the decision on the basis that Salaita had not yet become a faculty member at the time that his offer was withdrawn.

Both the Modern Language Association and the Middle East Studies Association sent letters to Wise in mid-August, expressing their support for Salaita and stating that her decision violated the principles of academic freedom. The American Indian studies program, where Salaita would have worked, shared its statement of no-confidence on its website in late August, declaring "the chancellor's action as a violation of academic freedom and freedom of speech." 16 departments at the university voted "no confidence" in Wise.

The chairman of the board of trustees, Christopher G. Kennedy, defended the decision to un-hire Salaita. In an interview with The News-Gazette in September he stated that "[i]t's absolutely clear that we could not bring Salaita onto this campus. We cannot endorse that behavior" and characterized Salaita's tweets as "blatantly anti-Semitic remarks." Salaita published an op-ed in the Chicago Tribune in late September, explaining his view of the controversy:

A partisan political blog cherry-picked a few of those tweets from hundreds to create the false impression that I am anti-Semitic. Publicly disclosed documents reveal that, within days, University of Illinois donors who disagreed with my criticism of Israeli policy threatened to withhold money if I wasn't fired. My academic career was destroyed over gross mischaracterizations of a few 140-character posts.

Over the following months over 5,000 academics pledged to boycott the university, and several scholars cancelled their speaking arrangements in solidarity with Salaita. Among them Todd Samuel Presner, Cornel West, Anita Hill, and David J. Blacker.

== Litigation ==
Salaita, insisting that he should be reinstated, sued the university in November 2014 to force it to release all records relating to the hiring process, as required by the Illinois Freedom of Information Act. The university had already in August released emails showing that it had come under pressure from donors, but it had refused to release all records. Salaita followed up with another suit in January 2015, Salaita v. Kennedy, to have his job back.

The Committee on Academic Freedom and Tenure at the university released a report in December 2014, stating that the way Salaita's proposed appointment was withdrawn was "not consistent with the university's guarantee of freedom of political speech" but that there were "legitimate questions about Dr. Salaita's professional fitness that must be addressed." It recommended that Salaita's candidacy "be remanded to the College of Liberal Arts and Sciences for reconsideration by a committee of qualified academic experts."

The News-Gazette in February 2015 noted that the situation was unique and argued that few "would engage in the kind of self-destructive behavior that Salaita did between job offer and contract approval," implying that Salaita had himself to blame.

AAUP released its report on the matter in April. It concluded that Salaita should have been afforded due process rights of a tenured faculty member and that the university violated the association's principles on academic freedom and tenure. In June it voted to censure the university.

== Ruling in Salaita's favor ==
In June, a federal judge ordered the university to release all emails related to Salaita's un-hiring, and the university's motion to dismiss the case was rejected on August 6. The ruling established two things. First, that by August 2014 Salaita was employed by the university and that the board of trustees had not confirmed his employment was an irrelevant formality; the university had no right to rescind his offer. And second, that Salaita's right to free speech trumped the university's concerns over keeping a "safe" or "disruption-free" environment:

The University’s attempt to draw a line between the profanity and incivility in Dr. Salaita’s tweets and the views those tweets presented is unavailing; the Supreme Court did not draw such a line when it found Cohen’s “Fuck the Draft” jacket protected by the First Amendment. Cohen v. California, 403 U.S. 15, 26 (1971). The tweets’ contents were certainly a matter of public concern, and the topic of Israeli-Palestinian relations often brings passionate emotions to the surface. Under these circumstances, it would be nearly impossible to separate the tone of tweets on this issue with the content and views they express. ... At the motion to dismiss stage, the Court simply cannot find that the University was not at all motivated by the content of Dr. Salaita’s tweets.

The ruling also allowed a spoliation of evidence claim to proceed against the university, which implicated Wise in hiding emails about the un-hiring of Salaita and she immediately resigned. The next day, the university complied with the judge's order and made hundreds of e-mails available to the public.

A settlement was reached in November which awarded Salaitia $600,000 and an additional $275,000 to cover his legal expenses. The university did not admit wrongdoing, and claimed that the settlement was due to the high cost of the litigation on which it had already spent $1.3 million. As part of the settlement it was agreed that Salaita would not join the university faculty.

== Aftermath ==
On June 15, 2015, Kennedy was given the Simon Wiesenthal Center's Spirit of Courage award for opposing Salaita's tenure:

In addition, the Center presented the Spirit of Courage Award to Christopher G. Kennedy, the immediate-past Chairman of the Board of Trustees for the University of Illinois who led the Board in their denial of final approval of the academic position offered to Steven Salaita, a professor who posted controversial and anti-Semitic rants on social media about Israel and her supporters.

Salaita announced in 2015 that he had taken up a position as the Edward W. Said Chair of American Studies at the American University of Beirut. However, the search was unexpectedly called off by the university president Fadlo R. Khuri citing "procedural irregularities." Khuri called the allegation that the search was called off because of Salaita's views "a malicious distortion of the facts involved in this case."

In 2017, Salaita announced that he was leaving academe because he could not get another job. On Facebook, he wrote: "I often feel like I’m reliving the [Illinois] fiasco", as well as that "Docility is a gift to those who profit from oppression. Academe can no longer afford this luxury." He appeared in the news in February 2019 working as a school bus driver in suburban Washington, D.C., and has since returned to academia as a professor in the English and Comparative Literature department at The American University in Cairo.
