= George Saliba =

American historian of science (born 1939)

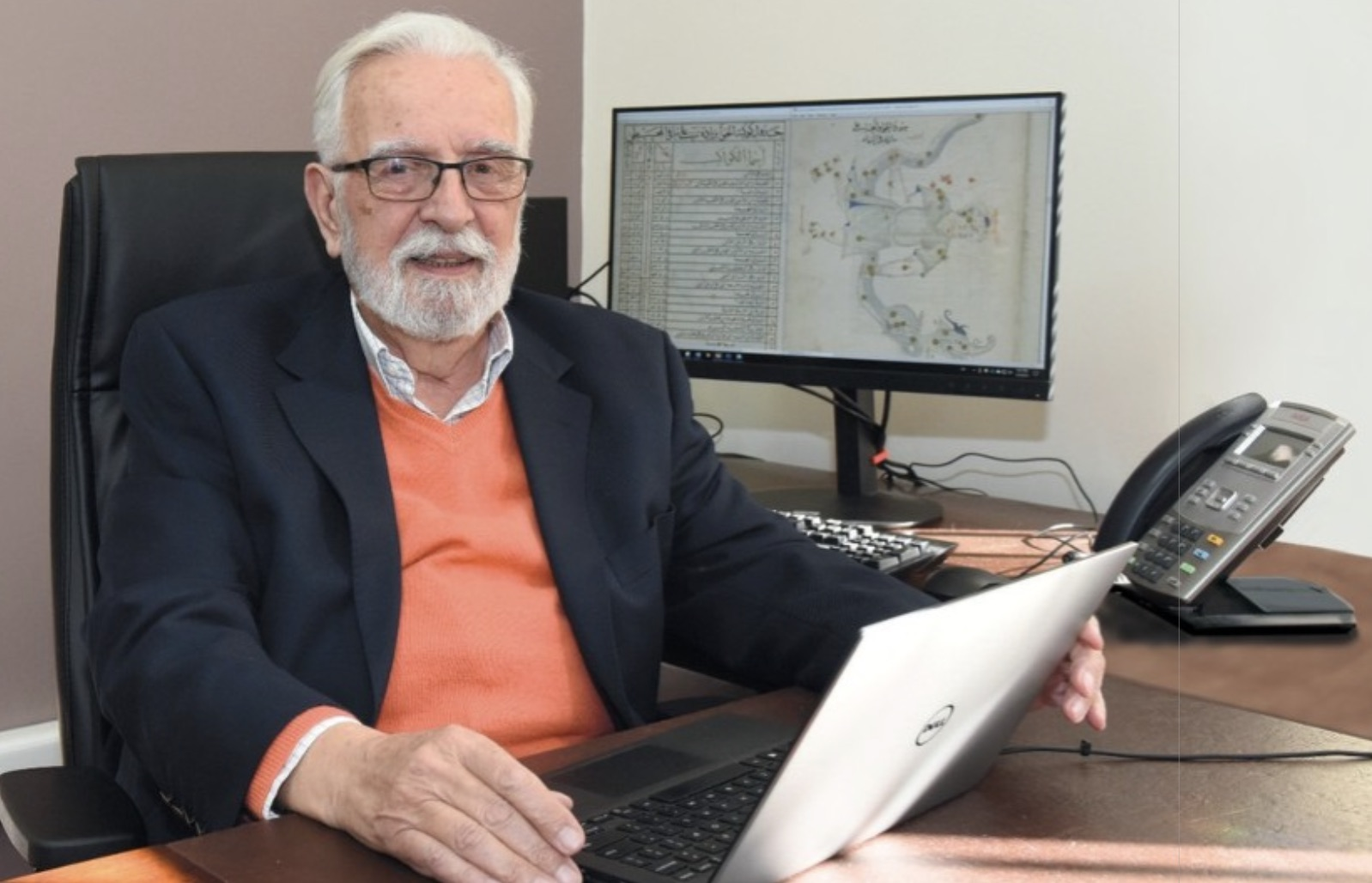
- Born: 1939 (age 86–87); Matn, Lebanon
- Education: American University of Beirut (B.S., M.A.); University of California, Berkeley (M.A., M.Phil., Ph.D.)
- Known for: Historian of Astronomy, Professor of Arabic and Islamic Science
- Awards: History of Science Prize (1993), History of Astronomy Prize (1996), Kluge Center of the Library of Congress Distinguished Scholar (2005-6)
- Scientific career
- Workplaces: Columbia University (1979-)
- Website: www.columbia.edu/~gas1/saliba.html

George Saliba (Arabic: جورج صليبا) is a Lebanese-American historian who is Professor of Arabic and Islamic Science at the Department of Middle Eastern, South Asian, and African Studies, Columbia University, New York, where he has been since 1979. Saliba is currently the founding director of the Farouk Jabre Center for Arabic & Islamic Science & Philosophy and the Jabre-Khwarizmi Chair in the History Department.

== Early life and education ==
Saliba received a bachelor's and master's degree in mathematics from the American University of Beirut. After, he received a Master of Science degree in Semitic languages and a doctorate in Islamic sciences from the University of California, Berkeley.

== Career ==
Saliba has been at Columbia University since 1979. He studies the development of scientific ideas from late antiquity till early modern times, with a special focus on the various planetary theories that were developed within the Islamic civilization and the impact of such theories on early European astronomy. He uncovered pathways of transmission of Islamic astronomy to Renaissance Europe. The main thrust of his research has been the connections between Islamic astronomers and Copernicus. His book Islamic Science and the Making of the European Renaissance has been published in multiple languages including Arabic, English, and Turkish.

=== Works on Arabic astronomy ===
The following is a translation (Google Translate) of a portion of the French Wikipedia article, to which reference is made on the Talk page of this article.

George Saliba made important contributions to Arabic astronomy, closely intertwined with astrology: “Islamic astronomy has long maintained ambivalent relationships with astrology. At the beginning, astronomy and astrology were both considered complementary disciplines which were referred to under the generic name of "science of the stars" ('ilm al-nujûm). The transmission of the astronomical traditions of India and ancient Greece within the new Muslim civilization provided the opportunity to subject these sciences to more rigorous analysis. [...] This critical work resulted in a separation of astronomy and astrology, primarily because the latter dealt with metaphysical questions [...] which came in one way or another into conflict with the religious dogma of Islam. [...] Furthermore, astrologers constantly needed to call on the work of astronomers, to the extent that any serious astrological operation had to be based on astronomical observations. Due to the close dependence of astrology on the observations and mathematical calculations of astronomy, the boundaries between the two disciplines became extremely blurred in the eyes of laymen.

In his work devoted to Arab astronomy, George Saliba highlighted the remarkable discoveries made up to the 16th century, while it was thought until the end of the 20th century that the progress of Arab astronomers in the theory of the planets had ended with the work of Ibn al-Shatir in the 14th century. Notably in his work on Shams al-Din al-Khafri (died 1550), a Safavid glossator of the writings of the astronomers of Maragha, about whom Saliba writes:

“Through his clear perception of the role of mathematics in the description of natural phenomena, this astronomer succeeded in taking the Hay'a tradition to heights unequaled elsewhere, on a mathematical level as well as on an astronomical level. The search for mathematical models capable of supplanting that of Ptolemy, and the examination of the works of his predecessors all in search of a unified mathematical model capable of accounting for all physical phenomena, made him conclude that all mathematical modeling has no physical meaning in itself, and that it is only one language among others to describe physical reality. He also convinced himself that the phenomena described by the Ptolemaic models do not admit of a unique mathematical solution subject to the same constraints; that on the contrary there are several mathematical models capable of accounting for Ptolemy's observations; that they arrive at the same predictions on the critical points that Ptolemy had retained to construct his own models (and that thus they do not give a better account of the observations than Ptolemy) while respecting the conditions imposed by Aristotelian cosmology, admitted by the authors of the hay'a tradition5. »

He showed the significant influence that Arab astronomy would exert on Indian, Chinese and European astronomy, studied the work of Alhazen and his challenge to develop a model of spheres that would avoid the errors of Ptolemy's model that he had noted as well as the contributions of Ali Qushji to the planetary model of al-Tusi and to the model of the orbit of Mercury.

The major star observation program undertaken in Damascus and Baghdad under the leadership of Al-Ma'mūn (813–833) made it possible to obtain better measurements, thanks to new observation methods9, than the results of Ptolemy, allowing a work of theoretical recovery of the latter. And more generally, scientists of the time questioned the validity of the models proposed by the Ancients. Thus a document attributed to the eldest of the brothers Banou Moussa mathematically demonstrated the non-existence of a ninth orb supposed to explain the diurnal movement of the stars10.

He studied the similarities between the Arab models and those of Copernicus, particularly for the Moon11. The models proposed mainly in the eastern part of the Arab world, in what is called the Maragha school, with the astronomers Nasir ad-Din at-Tusi and Ibn al-Shatir for example, retain the principle of a rotating sun around the earth12. However, they put in place tools (al-Tusi couple, ibn al-Shatir model) that we find in the work of Copernicus13,14. Nasir al-Din al-Tusi shows geometrically that it was possible to generate a rectilinear movement only from circular movements thanks to the hypocycloid15.

Saliba was also interested in the Persian and Muslim astronomer Banu Musa, who was the first to refute the Aristotelian conception of the world in the 9th century by asserting that celestial bodies and celestial spheres obey the same physical laws as the earth16. He studied the work of Ali Quchtchi, who participated in the development of the Sultanian Tables and developed a planetary model for the trajectory of Mercury using the tools put in place by Muʾayyad al-Dīn al-ʿUrḍī (en)17.

== Awards and honors ==
Saliba has won the History of Science Prize given by the Third World Academy of Science in 1993, and the History of Astronomy Prize in 1996 from the Kuwait Foundation for the Advancement of Science. In 2005 he was named as a Senior Distinguished Scholar at the John W. Kluge Center.

== Columbia Unbecoming ==
Saliba was one of the professors named in the 2004 Columbia Unbecoming controversy as allegedly being intimidating or unfair to students with pro-Israel views. A student of his, Lindsay Shrier, claimed that he told her that those with green eyes (like herself) are not racial "Semites", and have no valid national claim to Middle Eastern lands. Saliba claims that this is a fabrication. Saliba rejected the accusation and published a rebuttal in Columbia Spectator on 3 November 2004 to that effect.

== Bibliography ==
- "The Pebble That Became A Fist-Full Rock: On the Continued Importance of Edward Said's Orientalism". Archived from the original on October 4, 2012.
- Islamic Science and the Making of the European Renaissance, MIT Press (April 1, 2007) ISBN 0-262-19557-7 (hardcover, and in paperback as of 2011. The book has since been translated into Turkish, Arabic, Urdu and Bahasa (Indonesian)
- (With Linda Komaroff, Catherine Hess) The Arts of Fire : Islamic Influences on Glass and Ceramics of the Italian Renaissance, Getty Trust Publications: J. Paul Getty Museum (June 10, 2004), ISBN 0-89236-757-1 (hardcover)
- "The Ash'arites and the Science of the Stars" in Richard G. Hovannisian and George Sabagh (eds.), Religion and Culture in Medieval Islam (Cambridge: Cambridge University Press, 1999), 79–92.
- A History of Arabic Astronomy: Planetary Theories During the Golden Age of Islam, New York, University Press; (1994) ISBN 0-8147-7962-X (hardcover); (reissue edition: November 1995) ISBN 0-8147-8023-7 (paperback)
- "The Astronomical Work of Mu’ayyad al-Din al-’Urdi (died 1266): A Thirteenth Century Reform of Ptolemaic Astronomy", Markaz dirasat al-Wahda al-'Arabiya, Beirut, 1990, 1995
- "The Crisis of the Abbasid Caliphate" (Tabari, Ta'rikh Al-Rusul Wa'l-Muluk; annotated translation), State University of New York Press (November 1985) ISBN 0-87395-883-7 (Hardcover), ISBN 0-7914-0627-X (paperback)
- (With Sharon Gibbs) Planispheric astrolabes from the National Museum of American History, Smithsonian Institution Press, (1984) ISBN 0-608-11955-5 (paperback)
