= Steven Salaita =

American scholar (born 1975)

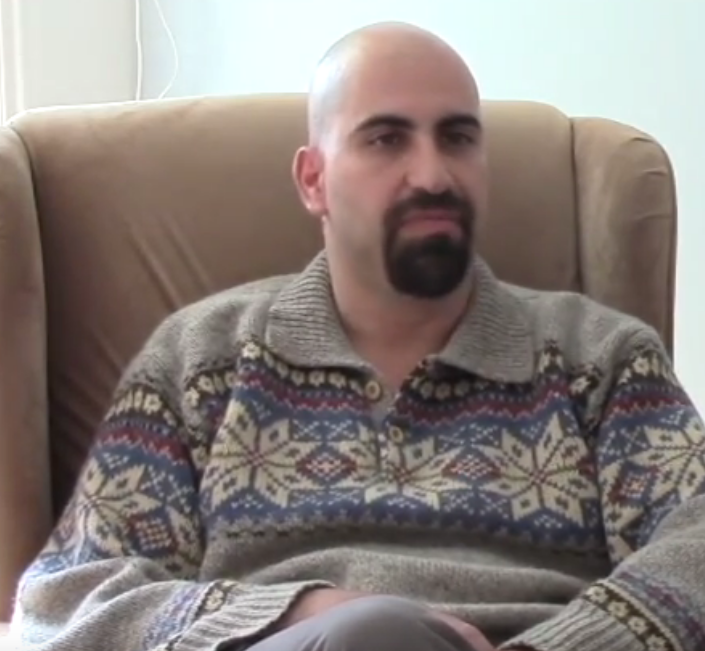
- Salaita in 2015
- Born: September 15, 1975 (age 51); Bluefield, West Virginia, United States
- Education: Radford University (BA, MA); University of Oklahoma (PhD)
- Occupations: Professor; former school-bus driver
- Known for: Steven Salaita hiring controversy

Steven Salaita (born September 15, 1975) is an American scholar, author and public speaker. He became the center of a controversy when the University of Illinois did not hire him as a professor of American Indian Studies following objections to a series of tweets critical of Israel's bombardment of Gaza in 2014. He also experienced similar controversy during the hiring process at the American University of Beirut in 2016.

== Early life and education ==
Salaita was born in Bluefield, West Virginia, on September 15, 1975, to Arab parents. His mother was born and raised in Nicaragua by Palestinian parents who originated in Beit Jala. Salaita's father was from Madaba, Jordan. He describes his own background as both Jordanian and Palestinian. His maternal grandmother lost her home in Ayn Karim outside of Jerusalem in 1948.

Salaita received his B.A. in political science from Radford University in Virginia in 1997 and a M.A. in English from Radford in 1999. He completed a Ph.D. at the University of Oklahoma in Native American studies in 2003 with a literature emphasis.

== Career ==
=== University of Wisconsin–Whitewater ===
Following completion of his Ph.D., Salaita became an assistant professor of English at the University of Wisconsin–Whitewater, where he taught American and ethnic American literature until 2006.

=== Virginia Tech ===
Salaita was then hired as associate professor of English at Virginia Tech, and received tenure three years later. In addition to teaching English courses, he wrote about themes of immigration, indigenous peoples, dislocation, race, ethnicity and multi-culturalism. Michael Hiltzik of the Los Angeles Times referred to him in 2014 as a "respected scholar in American Indian studies and Israeli-Arab relations."

Sinan Antoon reviewed Salaita's 2006 book, The Holy Land in Transit: Colonialism and the Quest for Canaan, writing that Salaita's comparative approach to Palestinian and Native American writers and the influence of politics on their production was "refreshing". He found the strongest chapter to be the one devoted to Salaita's personal experience of spending the summer of 2002 in the Shatila refugee camp, where he introduced Native American studies to the residents and developed perspectives on how "alternative narratives can broaden the consciousness of decolonial advocates." Salaita won a 2007 Gustavus Myers Outstanding Book Award for writing the book Anti-Arab Racism in the USA: Where It Comes from and What it Means for Politics Today. The Gustavus Myers Center for the Study of Bigotry and Human Rights recognized Salaita's book as one that extends "our understanding of the root causes of bigotry and the range of options we as humans have in constructing alternative ways to share power."

While teaching at Virginia Tech in 2013, Salaita became the center of controversy after writing an article in which he explained his refusal to endorse the "Support our troops" slogan. Salaita stated that "In recent years I've grown fatigued of appeals on behalf of the troops, which intensify in proportion to the belligerence or potential unpopularity of the imperial adventure du jour". He criticized what he called "unthinking patriotism". Reactions to his article were varied. A university spokesman, Lawrence G. Hincker, said that the university supported Salaita's freedom of speech, but added: "While our assistant professor may have a megaphone on Salon.com, his opinions not only do not reflect institutional position, we are confident they do not remotely reflect the collective opinion of the greater university community". In the student newspaper Collegiate Times, almost 40 Virginia Tech professors signed a letter protesting Hincker's comments. Faculty members criticized the university's statement as "wholly unsatisfactory" and "placing in doubt its commitment to academic freedom." Commenting on Salaita's views and the surrounding controversy, Greg Scholtz of the American Association of University Professors noted that "[u]pholding academic freedom can be a difficult and even embarrassing," but "the most reputable institutions give the most latitude."

=== University of Illinois hiring controversy ===
In October 2013, Salaita was offered tenure in the American Indian studies program at University of Illinois Urbana-Champaign, which he accepted, and he was scheduled to begin in August 2014. In July 2014, the two-month-long Gaza war broke out in which over 2,000 Palestinians were killed in response to 4,591 rockets fired by Hamas into Israeli cities and towns. Salaita posted hundreds of tweets criticizing Israel and its actions in Gaza. Some of the tweets angered pro-Israel students, faculty, and financial donors, who accused Salaita of antisemitism for rhetoric including "Zionists: transforming 'anti-Semitism' from something horrible into something honorable since 1948".

University Chancellor Phyllis Wise told Salaita that he would not get the job, so he sued the university. During the legal proceedings, the university was forced to release hundreds of emails relating to his case which revealed that Wise had come under immense pressure to rescind Salaita's offer from wealthy donors. She resigned from her position as chancellor after it was discovered that she had hidden emails from Freedom of Information Act (FOIA) requests regarding Salaita's employment denial. The university settled with Salaita for $875,000 in November 2015.

Salaita wrote about his experience in his book Inter/Nationalism: Decolonizing Native America and Palestine, in which he discussed the controversy from the perspective of decolonizing academic scholarship. He has supported an academic boycott of Israel and is a member of the organization US Campaign for the Academic and Cultural Boycott of Israel (USACBI).

=== American University of Beirut ===
In July 2015, Salaita announced he had accepted the Edward W. Said Chair of American Studies at the American University of Beirut (AUB), and began his assignment in the fall of 2015. After teaching at AUB under a one-year contract, the university chose not to offer him a permanent appointment due to "significant procedural irregularities" in the selection process. In 2016 at AUB, the hiring process for director of the Center for American Studies and Research (CASAR) was underway. Salaita was unanimously recommended for the position by the hiring committee and chair, Lisa Hajjar. According to Hajjar, university president Fadlo Khuri abruptly canceled the search for director "the day after the recommendation of Salaita for the position was discussed at the Faculty of Arts and Sciences Advisory Committee" for "procedural irregularities" in the search process.

Students and supporters began circulating an anonymous petition following Khuri's decision stating that "given Professor Salaita's recent termination from a tenure-track position at the University of Illinois at Urbana-Champaign for his pro-Palestinian political views, we fear that AUB is reproducing the trend of persecuting scholars who condemn the injustices committed in Palestine. This breach of academic freedom cannot be allowed at AUB."

In an email sent to the campus, Khuri stated that AUB leaders had "received several complaints from faculty members alleging conflicts of interest and misconduct". He also said that "There is no truth in the anonymous petition’s suggestion that the search was stopped in order to prevent Dr. Salaita from being selected as CASAR director."

=== American University in Cairo ===
In 2017, Salaita announced that he was leaving academia because no institution would hire him for full-time work. Though he appeared in the news in February 2019 working as a school bus driver in suburban Washington, D.C., he has since returned to academia as a professor in the English and Comparative Literature department at the American University in Cairo.

Salaita's first novel, a political thriller called Daughter, Son, Assassin, was published in 2024 by Common Notions Press.

== Books ==
- Anti-Arab Racism in the USA: Where it Comes From and What it Means for Politics (2006) – Winner of 2007 Gustavus Myers Center for the Study of Bigotry and Human Rights' "Outstanding Book" Award.
- The Holy Land in Transit: Colonialism and the Quest for Canaan (2006)
- Arab American Literary Fictions Cultures and Politics (2007)
- The Uncultured Wars (2008)
- Modern Arab American Fiction: A Reader's Guide (2011)
- Israel's Dead Soul (2011)
- Uncivil Rites (2015)
- Inter/Nationalism: Decolonizing Native America and Palestine (2016)
- An Honest Living: A Memoir of Peculiar Itineraries (2024)
- Daughter, Son, Assassin (2024)
