= Questioning the Veil =

2009 book by Marnia Lazreg

Questioning the Veil: Open Letters to Muslim Women
- Author: Marnia Lazreg
- Publisher: Princeton University Press
- Publication date: 2009

Questioning the Veil: Open Letters to Muslim Women is a 2009 book by Marnia Lazreg, published by Princeton University Press. In the book Lazreg asks critical questions regarding commonly accepted reasons why women wear Islamic hijab or the veil (khimar), and in each chapter she asks this question to readers in the form of letters. Daniel Varisco of Hofstra University described the book as "a polemic, in this case against the veil, from a secular standpoint." The book is addressed to women who observe or are considering observing hijab by wearing the khimar.

Ethnicity and Race in a Changing World: A Review Journal stated that "By drawing attention to the veil – a subject which the author claims has been dismissed as ‘unimportant’ given the wider political climate, Questioning the Veil instead shows how discussions of the veil illuminate our understanding of the contemporary role of Islamic society and its relationship with the ‘West’."

== Background ==
Lazreg, a professor of sociology at Hunter College and at the City University of New York Graduate Center, is a Muslim woman who was born in Algeria. She wore the hijab as a girl because her paternal grandmother had asked her to.

== Contents ==
The book begins with an introduction in which Lazreg had outlined her previously published statements, in which she criticized the ideas that women needed to be rescued from the veil or Muslim men, and she criticized the concept that Islam oppresses women. After the introduction, there are five chapters. Chapter 1 discusses wearing the hijab to show modesty. Chapter 2 discusses whether the hijab prevents men from making advanced towards women. Chapter 3 discusses using the hijab as a marker of a Muslim identity. Chapter 4 analyzes the issue in regard to religious conviction and piety. In Chapter 5 the author states her belief that women should not wear the hijab.

The book has a strong focus on Algeria and her own experiences growing up, and according to Varisco it does not broadly cover the whole Muslim world and all social classes. The book includes content from interviews of Muslim women in the Middle East and North Africa as well as France and the United States; these women also discuss their experiences.

Irina Vainovski-Mihai of Dimitrie Cantemir Christian University in Bucharest, Romania stated that the book is "not a scholarly treatise, but a very personal inquiry". Varisco stated that "Those who are looking for more fodder for Islam-bashing, as in the mass media accounts of Irshad Manji and Ayaan Hirsi Ali, will not find it in this book."

== Reception ==
Varisco described it as "an engaging book, challenging both those who would ban the veil as secular heresy and those Muslim women who consciously reduce their religion and their sex to the futile attempt to avoid a self-serving male gaze."

Faegheh Shirazi of the University of Texas stated that "writing is honest and easy to read, and she raises crucial points that must be examined further." Shirazi argued that women should be able to have a choice of whether to veil or not on their own terms, and that even though there are women who do not want to wear the veil and wear it "for the wrong reasons" there are many women who want to wear the veil and do not question it.

Vainovski-Mihai stated that the book is "most readable and powerful" and that "Marnia Lazreg’s book is a rich and committed contribution to the current debate on the veil. Its inconsistencies in using anecdotal facts for psychological speculations and for inferring general conclusions will no doubt positively result in encouraging further the pro and con discussions of a topic standing in the limelight." She stated that she perceived some "much-peddled Orientalistic storylines" in the anecdotes.

Susanna Mancini of the University of Bologna and SAIS Johns Hopkins University stated that Lazreg's argument that hijab denies Muslim women from having autonomy with their bodies and that it reduces them to their bodies is "plausible" but that the argument should not be used to justify legal bans on hijab.
