= Marnia Lazreg =

Algerian academic (1941–2024)

- مارنيا لزرق
- Born: January 10, 1941; Mostaganem, French Algeria
- Died: January 13, 2024 (aged 83); Manhattan, New York City, New York, U.S

Marnia Lazreg (January 10, 1941 – January 13, 2024) was an Algerian academic. Her work focused on women in the Muslim world, with a particular focus on Algeria.

== Early life ==
Lazreg was born in Mostaganem, and grew up in colonial Algeria, raised by her mother, a homemaker, and her father, a dry goods seller. As a child, she refused to wear a headscarf. Lazreg was able to attend a school for French children, and earned a French Baccalauréat in Philosophy and Mathematics in 1960, during the Algerian War of Independence. Following the war, her family moved to Algiers, where she worked for the city's municipal administration.

She went on to receive a Licence-ès-Lettres in English Literature from the University of Algiers in 1966. After graduating, she began working for Sonatrach, and was sent to work at its New York office in 1967. While working in New York, she attended New York University, earning her master's degree in 1970 and her PhD in sociology in 1974.

== Academic career ==
In the 1970s, while completing her dissertation about class differences in Algeria, Lazreg began teaching sociology at Hunter College. She published her first book, The Emergence of Classes in Algeria, in 1976, which was based on her dissertation.

Over the next decade, she taught at Brooklyn College, Hampshire College, The New School, and Sarah Lawrence College, before returning to Hunter College in 1988 as a sociology professor.

In 1995, Lazreg spoke at the U.N. Fourth World Conference on Women.

From 1999 to 2000, Lazreg worked with the World Bank on programs which aimed to advance opportunities for women and girls.

Her 2017 book, Foucault's Orient, argued that Foucault was biased toward Western intellectual traditions.

In 2019, Lazreg published her first and only novel, The Awakening of the Mother, under the pen name Meriem Belkelthoum. The French-language novel was based on her childhood in Algeria.

Lazreg retired in September 2023.

== Personal life ==
Lazreg had two sons from a marriage with Mark Woodcock, whom she divorced. She died in Manhattan on January 13, 2024, at the age of 83, while undergoing treatment for cancer.

== Publications ==
=== Books ===
- The Emergence of Classes in Algeria (1976)
- Lazreg, Marnia (1995). The Eloquence of Silence: Algerian Women in Question. Routledge. ISBN 978-1-351-86702-3.
- Lazreg, Marnia (2008). Torture and the Twilight of Empire: From Algiers to Baghdad. Princeton University Press. ISBN 978-0-691-17348-1.
- Questioning the Veil (2009)
- Lazreg, Marnia (2017). Foucault's Orient: The Conundrum of Cultural Difference, From Tunisia to Japan. Berghahn Books. ISBN 978-1-78533-623-2.
- Lazreg, Marnia (2021). Islamic Feminism and the Discourse of Post-liberation: The Cultural Turn in Algeria. Routledge, Taylor & Francis Group. ISBN 978-1-351-80488-2.

=== Chapters ===
- Lazreg, Marnia (1990). "Feminism and Difference: The Perils of Writing as a Woman on Women in Algeria". In Hirsch, Marianne; Keller, Evelyn Fox (eds.). Conflicts in Feminism. Routledge. ISBN 978-1-135-27525-9.
- Lazreg, Marnia (1994). "Women's Experience and Feminist Epistemology: A critical neo-rationalist approach". Knowing the Difference. Routledge. doi:10.4324/9780203216125-5 (inactive 12 July 2025). ISBN 978-0-203-21612-5.
- Lazreg, Marnia (2000). "The Triumphant Discourse of Global Feminism: Should Other Women Be Known?". Going Global. Routledge. doi:10.4324/9781315864235-3 (inactive 12 July 2025). ISBN 978-1-315-86423-5.
- Lazreg, Marnia (2000). "Citizenship and Gender in Algeria". In Joseph, Saud (ed.). Gender and Citizenship in the Middle East. Syracuse University Press. ISBN 978-0-8156-2865-1.
- Lazreg, Marnia (2008). "Consequences of Political Liberalization and Sociocultural Mobilization for Women in Algeria, Egypt and Jordan". Governing Women. Routledge. doi:10.4324/9780203892503-5 (inactive 12 July 2025). ISBN 978-0-203-89250-3.

=== Articles ===
- Lazreg, Marnia (1983). "The Reproduction of Colonial Ideology: The Case of the Kabyle Berbers". Arab Studies Quarterly. 5 (4): 380–395. ISSN 0271-3519. JSTOR 41857696.
- Lazreg, Marnia (1990). "Gender and Politics in Algeria: Unraveling the Religious Paradigm". Signs. 15 (4): 755–780. doi:10.1086/494627.
- Lazreg, Marnia (1998). "Islamism and the Recolonization of Algeria". Arab Studies Quarterly. 20 (2): 43–58. ISSN 0271-3519. JSTOR 41858247.
