= Kathy Eden =

American literary scholar

- Awards: Guggenheim Fellowship (1988), Great Teacher Award (1998)

Academic background
- Education: Smith College (BA); Stanford University (PhD)

Academic work
- Discipline: Renaissance literature
- Institutions: Columbia University

Kathy Eden is an American professor of literature. She is the Chavkin Family Professor of English and Professor of Classics at Columbia University.

== Biography ==
Eden grew up on Long Island, the daughter of a surgeon and a homemaker. She obtained her BA from Smith College, where she studied under Karl Paul Donfried, and PhD in comparative literature from Stanford University. Her research has included Renaissance humanism and the history of rhetorical and poetic theory in antiquity. She also teaches the Core Curriculum for Columbia undergraduates. Her students in academia included former Modern Language Association president Michael Bérubé and Luke Leafgren, dean of Mather House of Harvard College.

She received a Guggenheim Fellowship in 1998. In 2019, Eden became a member of the American Philosophical Society.
