= Nicholas De Genova =

American academic

- Born: 1968 (age 57–58); Chicago
- Education: University of Chicago
- Scientific career
- Fields: Anthropology, Geography, ethnic studies, Latino studies, migration studies
- Workplaces: Stanford University; Columbia University; University of Bern; University of Amsterdam; Goldsmiths, University of London; King's College London; University of Houston; Institute for Advanced Study, Princeton

Nicholas De Genova is a professor in the Department of Comparative Cultural Studies at the University of Houston, where he served as department chair from 2018 to 2024. During the 2024–25 academic year, he is a Member of the Institute for Advanced Study at Princeton. His research centers primarily on migration, borders, citizenship, and race.

De Genova was the host of the first four episodes of the Metropolis Rising podcast (first launched in February 2021).

== Education and career ==
De Genova received his BA, MA, and PhD in anthropology from the University of Chicago.

De Genova was previously a Reader in Geography at King's College London (2013–16) and Reader in Anthropology at Goldsmiths, University of London (2011–2013). He held the Swiss Chair in Mobility Studies during the Fall semester of 2009 as a visiting professor at the Institute of Social Anthropology at the University of Bern in Switzerland, and was a Visiting research professor in the Institute of Migration and Ethnic Studies at the University of Amsterdam in 2010. From 2000 to 2009, he was assistant professor of anthropology and Latino Studies at Columbia University. Prior to his time at Columbia, he served as a visiting professor at Stanford University (1997–1999). His ethnographic and sociolegal research focused on the experiences of Mexican migrants in the United States, especially the historical and ongoing production of the conditions of their "illegality."

== Works ==
De Genova is the author of Working the Boundaries: Race, Space, and "Illegality" in Mexican Chicago (Duke University Press, 2005);

co-author of Latino Crossings: Mexicans, Puerto Ricans, and the Politics of Race and Citizenship (with Ana Y. Ramos-Zayas; Routledge, 2003);

editor of Racial Transformations: Latinos and Asians Remaking the United States (Duke University Press, 2006);

co-editor of The Deportation Regime: Sovereignty, Space, and the Freedom of Movement (with Nathalie Peutz; Duke University Press, 2010);

editor of The Borders of "Europe": Autonomy of Migration, Tactics of Bordering (Duke University Press, 2017);

co-editor of Roma Migrants in the European Union: Un/Free Mobility (with Can Yildiz; Routledge, 2019);

co-editor of Europa / Crisis: Nuevas Palabras Claves en “la Crisis” en y de “Europa” (with Martina Tazzioli; Madrid: La Catarata, 2021).

== "A Million Mogadishus" controversy ==
De Genova briefly rose to notoriety for a statement he made during a faculty teach-in on March 26, 2003, protesting the U.S. invasion of Iraq and the impending Iraq War, when he "celebrated the defeat of the U.S. military in Vietnam as a victory for the cause of human self-determination and openly called for the material and practical defeat of the U.S. military occupation of Iraq." De Genova said that he hoped the U.S. would experience "a million Mogadishus," a reference to the Battle of Mogadishu, an incident in which 18 American soldiers were killed in 1993, which brought about the end of the U.S. involvement in Somalia. He also stated that “U.S. patriotism is inseparable from imperial warfare and white supremacy" and that "The only true heroes are those who find ways to defeat the U.S. military."

=== Criticism ===
De Genova's comments drew sharp criticism from a number of sources:

- Historian Alan Brinkley, who was also at the teach-in, sharply criticized De Genova, stating that: "I was appalled by what he said, and ashamed to be on the same platform with him. I certainly defend his right to say whatever he wishes, but the rest of us have an equal right to disassociate ourselves from his abhorrent remarks."
- Professor Eric Foner, who helped organize the teach-in, stated that "Professor De Genova's speech did not represent the views of the organizers. I personally found it quite reprehensible." and that "The antiwar movement does not desire the death of American soldiers. We do not accept his view of what it means to be a patriot. I began my talk, which came later, by repudiating his definition of patriotism, saying the teach-in was a patriotic act, that I believe patriots are those who seek to improve their country."
- Lee C. Bollinger, the president of Columbia University, declared to the press that he was “shocked” and that “this one crosses the line.” In a subsequent iteration, Bollinger declared that he was “appalled” and summarily denounced Professor De Genova's comments as “outrageous.” While stating that "Under well-established principles of the First Amendment, this is within a person's right to free speech" also stated that "Not for a second, however, does that insulate it from criticism. I am shocked that someone would make such statements. I am especially saddened for the families of those whose lives are now at risk."
- Arizona Congressman J. D. Hayworth submitted a letter, signed by 103 Republican Congressmen, to Columbia President Lee Bollinger urging him to fire De Genova. Hayworth argued that "the issue is not whether De Genova has the right to make idiotic and hateful comments - he surely does - but whether he has the right to a job teaching at Columbia University after making such comments."

In addition, De Genova was subjected to numerous aggravated and repeated death threats and underwent major disruptions in his ordinary personal and professional life as a result of security considerations. In that context of public adversity, the untenured professor granted an interview to The Chronicle of Higher Education, which dubbed De Genova as "The most hated professor in America."

De Genova was denied promotion in 2007 and his employment at Columbia was terminated in 2009.

This was not the only time De Genova had made controversial remarks. At a Columbia rally in solidarity with Palestine in 2002, he declared, “The heritage of the Holocaust belongs to the Palestinian people. The State of Israel has no claim to the heritage of the Holocaust. The heritage of the oppressed belongs to the oppressed, not the oppressor.” Later, with respect to Bollinger's hostility to a campaign by Columbia University faculty for divestment from the Israeli military, De Genova stated that Bollinger "has set himself up as an apologist of war crimes and apartheid,” and called upon Bollinger to resign.

=== Response from De Genova ===
In a letter to the Columbia Spectator, published a few days after the teach-in, De Genova wrote that "imperialism and white supremacy have been constitutive of U.S. nation-state formation and U.S. nationalism" and called for "repudiating all forms of U.S. patriotism" and urged "the defeat of the U.S. war machine." He also stated that "my rejection of U.S. nationalism is an appeal to liberate our own political imaginations such that we might usher in a radically different world in which we will not remain the prisoners of U.S. global domination."

De Genova has published a book chapter discussing the "million Mogadishus" controversy and its significance for academic freedom and free speech. As recently as 2021 his personal website stated he was writing a memoir on free speech during wartime in which he would examine the context in which he made his statements regarding the war as well as the pressure he came under in their aftermath.
