= Fadlo R. Khuri =

President of the American University of Beirut

Fadlo Khuri
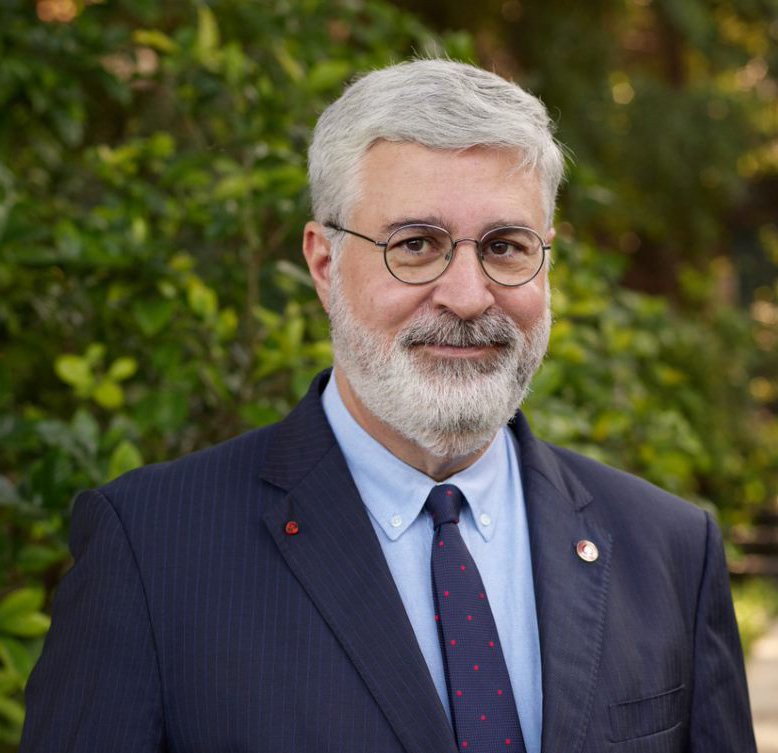

16th president of the American University of Beirut
- Incumbent
- Assumed office September 1, 2015
- Preceded by: Peter F. Dorman

Personal details
- Born: Boston, Massachusetts, U.S.
- Citizenship: United States; Lebanon
- Spouse: Lamya Tannous
- Children: 3
- Education: Yale University (BS); Columbia University (MD)
- Website: AUB Office of the President

Fadlo R. Khuri (Arabic: فضلو خوري) is a Lebanese-American physician, researcher, and academic administrator who has been the 16th president of the American University of Beirut (AUB) since 2015. The Board of Trustees announced the renewal of President Khuri's term until 2030. A specialist in oncology, he previously held positions in medical research and academic administration in the United States. On April 23, 2025, Khuri was elected as a fellow of the American Academy of Arts and Sciences in the category of Educational and Academic Leadership.

== Early life and education ==
Fadlo Khuri was born in Boston, Massachusetts, to Lebanese parents; his father has roots in Aley and also possibly in Zahle or Bekaa, while his mother is from Koura, North Lebanon. He was raised between the United States and Lebanon. His father Raja Khuri, is a physician and former dean of the AUB Faculty of Medicine. Khuri pursued his undergraduate studies at Yale University and obtained his medical degree from Columbia University's College of Physicians and Surgeons.

== Academic and medical career ==
Khuri was an oncologist and medical researcher in the United States. He was professor and chair of hematology and medical oncology at Emory University's School of Medicine and was deputy director of the Winship Cancer Institute in Georgia.

Khuri has authored more than 350 peer-reviewed articles, over 50 editorials and perspectives, and more than 100 reviews and book chapters. Among his most highly cited publications is a controlled trial of ONYX-015, a selectively replicating adenovirus, in combination with cisplatin and 5-fluorouracil in patients with recurrent head and neck cancer. Another study highlights the overexpression of Cyclooxygenase-2 as a marker of poor prognosis in early-stage non-small cell lung cancer. His clinical cancer research also includes a Phase I study on the farnesyltransferase inhibitor lonafarnib in combination with paclitaxel for solid tumors.

He is a fellow of the American Association for the Advancement of Science (2014), the Royal College of Physicians (2017), and a full member and vice president of the Lebanese Academy of Sciences (since 2015).

== Presidency at AUB ==
Khuri was AUB's president during one of Lebanon's most severe economic crises, the 2020 Beirut explosion, and the COVID-19 pandemic. He reintroduced academic tenure (2018), established an independent nursing school (2018), and launched AUB Online and the twin campus AUB Mediterraneo in Pafos, Cyprus. He also implemented a tobacco-free policy (2018), co-led a national COVID-19 vaccination campaign, and facilitated medical and educational support for Syrian refugees.

Under his leadership, AUB secured the Keserwan Medical Center in Jounieh, Lebanon, marking the university's expansion into community healthcare.
