= Lisa Anderson =

American political scientist

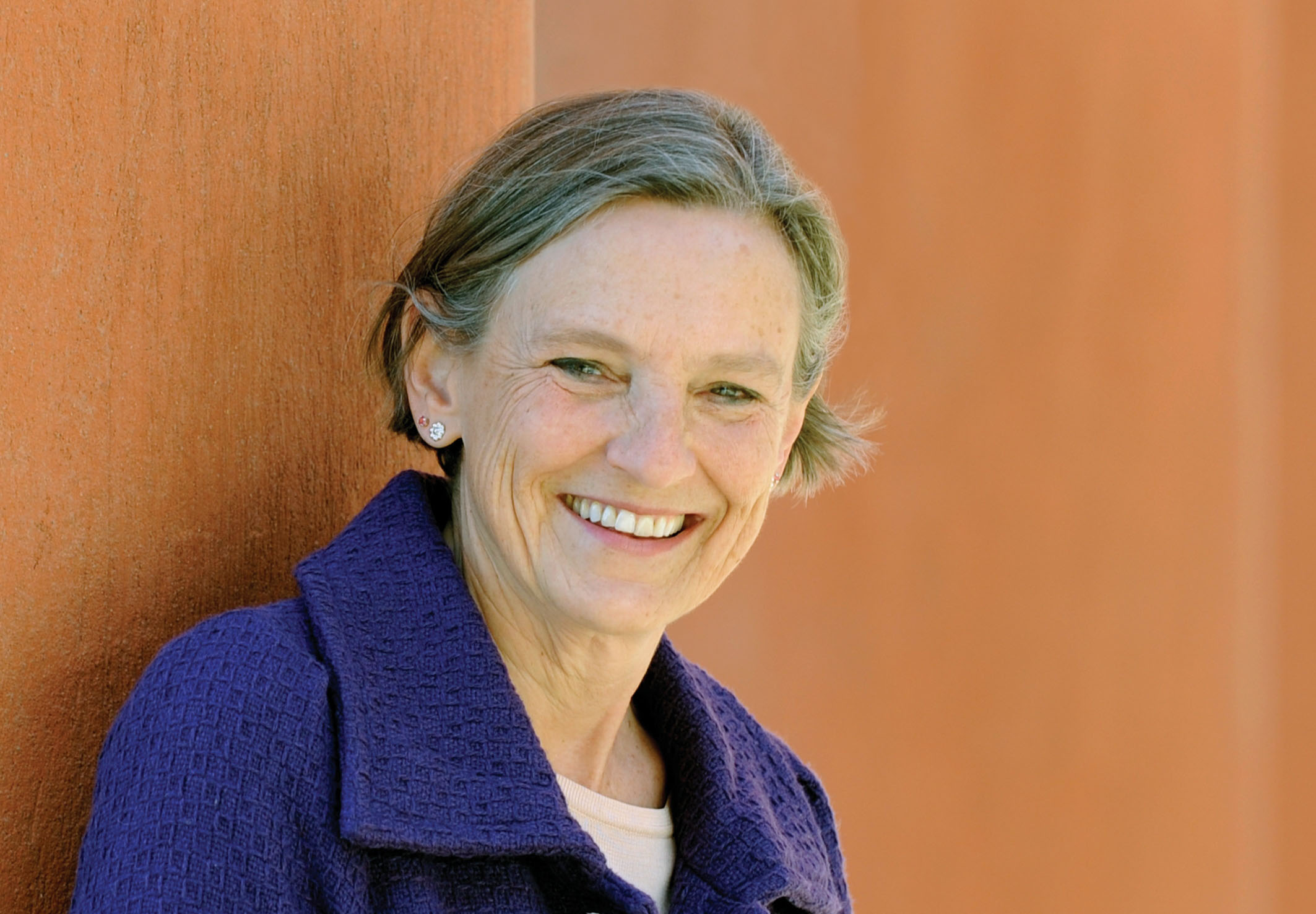

President of The American University in Cairo
- In office January 7, 2011 – June 23, 2016
- Preceded by: David C. Arnold
- Succeeded by: Francis J. Ricciardone Jr.

Dean of Columbia SIPA
- In office January 11, 1996 – December 21, 2008
- Preceded by: John Ruggie
- Succeeded by: John H. Coatsworth

Personal details
- Born: October 16, 1950 (age 76)
- Education: Sarah Lawrence College (B.A.); Tufts University (M.A.) Columbia University (Ph.D.)
- Website: Office of the President

Lisa Anderson (born October 16, 1950) is an American political scientist and the former President of the American University in Cairo (AUC).

== Research and career ==
A specialist on Middle Eastern and North African politics, Anderson served as the President of AUC from 2011 to 2016 and as Provost from 2008 to 2010. Prior to joining AUC, Anderson served as the James T. Shotwell Professor of International Relations at Columbia University, the dean of Columbia's School of International and Public Affairs, the chair of the political science department and the director of the Middle East Institute. Previously, she was an assistant professor of government and social studies at Harvard University.

Anderson announced her departure from AUC in June 2015. The AUC Board asked her to leave because she removed the two-tier pay scale system that grossly underpaid Egyptian faculty, though they had the same stature as faculty from other countries. Lisa Anderson had an open door policy for students to directly discuss issues with her regarding all aspects of the university and the surrounding political turmoil. Anderson's demeanor was pragmatic, open, and flexible.

== Affiliations ==
Anderson is the former president of the Middle East Studies Association (MESA) and former chair of the board of the Social Science Research Council. Anderson is also a former member of the Council of the American Political Science Association and served on the board of the Carnegie Council on Ethics in International Affairs. She is member emerita of the board of Human Rights Watch, where she served as co-chair of Human Rights Watch/Middle East, co-chair of the International Advisory Board of the Alexander von Humboldt Foundation and member of the International Advisory Council of the World Congress for Middle East Studies. She is also a member of the Council on Foreign Relations.

== Education ==
Anderson holds a Bachelor of Arts from Sarah Lawrence College and a Master of Arts in Law and Diplomacy from The Fletcher School at Tufts University. She earned her Ph.D in political science from Columbia University in 1981, where she also received a certificate from the Middle East Institute. Her academic research focuses on state formation, regime change, and economic and political development in the Middle East.

== Recognition ==
In 2002, Anderson received an honorary doctor of laws from Monmouth University. In fall 2013, she visited the American Academy in Berlin as a Richard C. Holbrooke Distinguished Visitor. In 2015, she received an honorary degree from the American University in Paris and was elected as a member of the American Academy of Arts and Sciences.

== Selected publications ==
- Pursuing Truth, Exercising Power: Social Science and Public Policy in the Twenty-first Century (Columbia University Press, 2003)
- The State and Social Transformation in Tunisia and Libya, 1830–1980 (Princeton University Press, 1986)
- Transitions to Democracy, Editor (Columbia University Press, 1999)
- The Origins of Arab Nationalism (co-editor; Columbia University Press, 1991)
