= Albany Student Press =

Newspaper of the University at Albany, New York

- Type: Weekly student newspaper
- Format: Web
- Owner: Albany Student Press Corporation
- Publisher: Albany Student Press Corporation
- Editor-in-chief: Mattie Fitzpatrick
- Founded: Fall 1916
- Language: English
- Headquarters: University at Albany
- Website: albanystudentpress.com

The Albany Student Press or the ASP, the newspaper of the University at Albany, The State University of New York, is one of the oldest (founded 1916) continuously published and independent college newspapers in the United States. As of 2023, its editor-in-chief is Mattie Fitzpatrick and its News Editor is Lucienne Burns.

First published monthly in 1892 as The Normal School Echo, the paper would evolve into a weekly in 1916, known as the State College News. The newspaper has evolved into a comprehensive news agency with a circulation of 8,000. It is released on Mondays during the school year and is published by the Albany Student Press Corporation. The paper covers campus news, sports, and entertainment, and it includes opinion columns by students. It is currently digitally published via the ASP website, but was once delivered to newsstands located around the campus.

As of 2022, the ASP receives club funding from the UAlbany Student Association, but continues to have no advisement or managing affiliation with the university. Club funding assists with the overall functioning and succession of the paper.

== History ==
The State University News began publishing in the fall of 1916. From 1892 to 1916 a monthly periodical that featured student work was published under the title The Normal School Echo. The newspaper officially changed its name to the Albany Student Press in 1963 to reflect the growing shift to a major research university. By the 1960s, the newspaper had a growing readership, increased coverage of world, national, and state events. The paper was published twice a week – Tuesdays and Fridays – for many years, but later switched to once a week. In the fall of 1997, the ASP launched SUNY Albany's only creative writing and arts magazine, The Fountain Pen.

In the fall of 2011, the paper saw several changes to its design. Among the changes are a new masthead featuring the school's purple and yellow-gold colors with no logo as in years prior. There have also been changes to the fonts and layout for a much cleaner look.

In the spring of 2021, the paper converted to a fully online publication process, through the website www.albanystudentpress.online due to funding difficulties during the pandemic. The ASP launched a redesigned website in the fall of 2022.
