= Hill-Crest =

Coordinates: 47°37′35.5″N 122°17′10.7″W

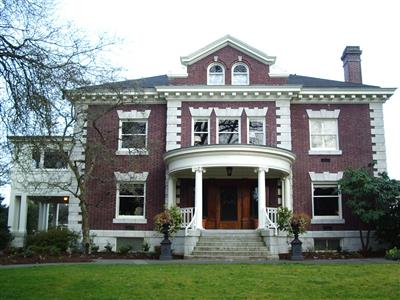
- 2015

- Location within Washington (state)

General information
- Type: official residence
- Location: 808 36th Avenue East, Seattle, Washington, United States
- Current tenants: Robert J. Jones
- Groundbreaking: 1907
- Owner: University of Washington

Technical details
- Size: 12,800 square feet (1,190 m^{2})
- Lifts/elevators: 1
- Grounds: 1.4 acres (0.57 ha)

Other information
- Number of rooms: 35

Hill-Crest (sometimes known as the "Walker-Ames Mansion" or "the 808 House") is the official residence of the president of the University of Washington. As of 2013 it was the single most valuable public university presidential residence in the United States.

== History ==
Built in 1907 by lumber baron Edwin Ames and his wife, the heiress Maud Walker Ames, Hill-Crest was in 1931 bequeathed to the University of Washington, along with most of the rest of the substantial Walker-Ames fortune. The university took possession of the property in 1932 with president Lyle Spencer becoming the mansion's first university occupant. The conditions of the bequest require the president of the university maintain permanent residence in the home and a 2006 request by president Mark Emmert to maintain a separate residence was rejected by the university's board of regents‍—‌despite a flooded basement and other problems with the property‍—‌as it would have forced the university to sell the house.

In the early 2000s the property underwent an $800,000 renovation, following which a $2 million endowment was established by former football player Jim Houston to guarantee its perpetual upkeep.

University president Michael K. Young was married at Hill-Crest in 2011.

=== Previous presidential residences ===
The University president's first residence was a wood frame structure located between Fourth Avenue and Fifth Avenue in downtown Seattle. It was occupied from 1861 to 1895. The former New York Pavilion of the Alaska-Yukon-Pacific Exposition was subsequently renovated to serve as the seat of the president, which it continued to do until 1927 when it was converted for use as academic space.

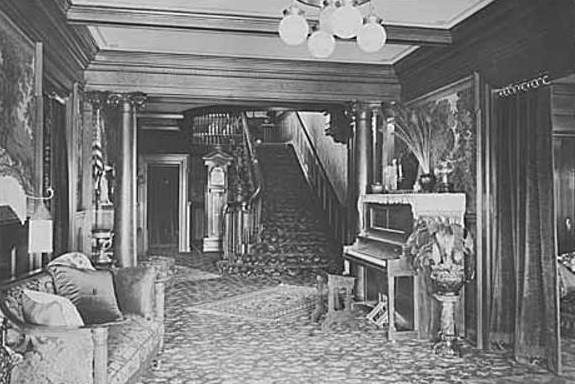
An interior space at Hill-Crest pictured in 1912

== Property ==
Hill-Crest has 35 rooms, as well as an elevator and a pipe organ, and sits on 1.4 acres (0.57 ha) overlooking Lake Washington. The total interior footprint is 12,800 square feet (1,190 m^{2}); interiors are decorated in wood paneling, principally Douglas fir and Honduran mahogany. There is a separate carriage house.

Hill-Crest's approximate market value, in 2013, was $8.5 million making it then the single most expensive public university presidential residence in the United States and more valuable than the Washington Governor's Mansion.

The facility is maintained by a full-time, non-residential staff which includes a majordomo, chef, gardener, and housekeeper.

== See also ==
- List of University of Washington Presidents
