= Ana Mari Cauce =

American psychologist and academic administrator

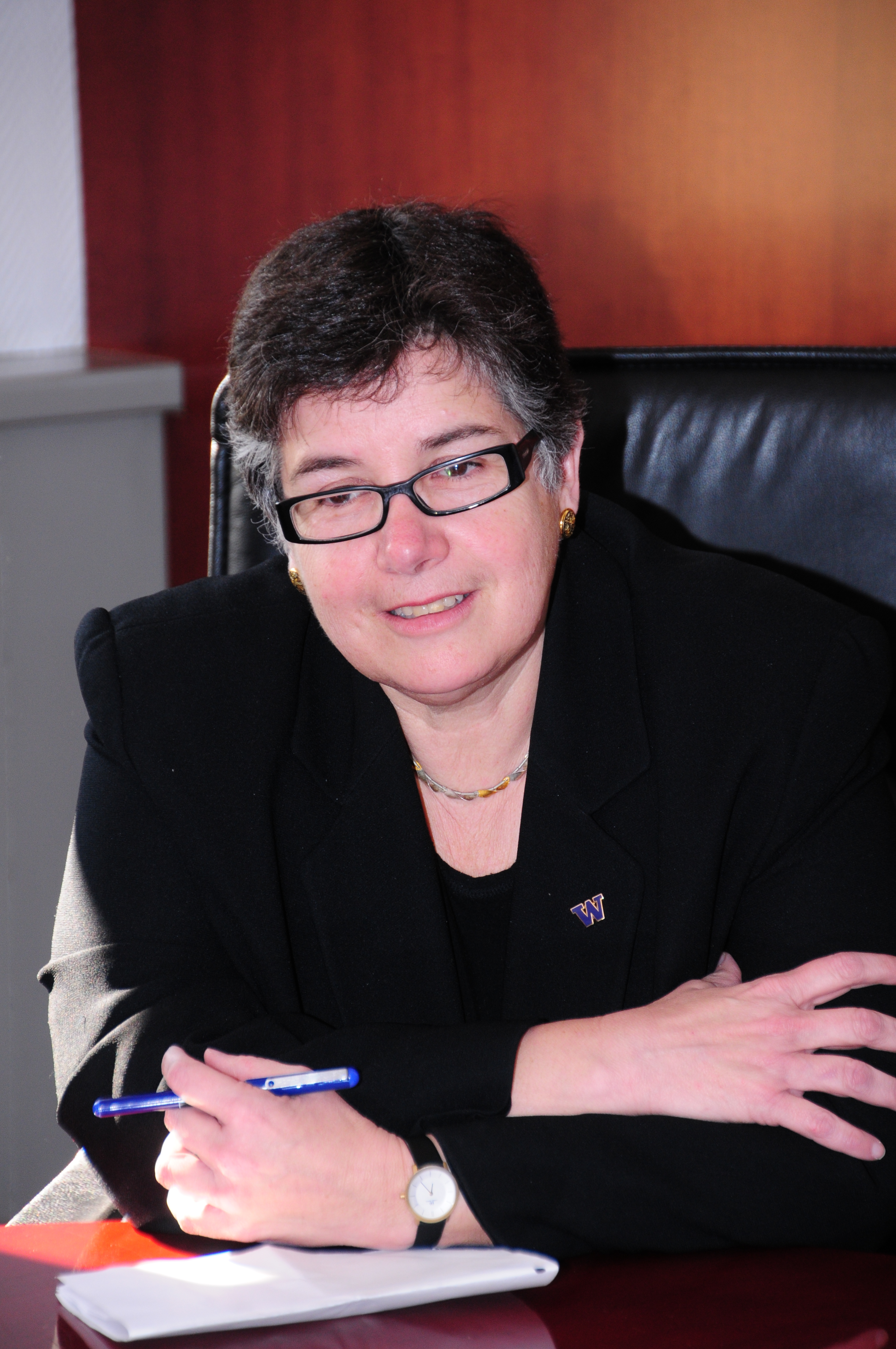
- Cauce in 2013

33rd President of the University of Washington
- In office March 2, 2015 (Note: Interim: March 2–October 13, 2015) – July 31, 2025
- Preceded by: Michael K. Young
- Succeeded by: Robert J. Jones

Personal details
- Born: January 11, 1956 (age 70) Havana, Cuba
- Spouse: Susan Joslyn
- Education: University of Miami (BA); Yale University (MS, MPhil, PhD)
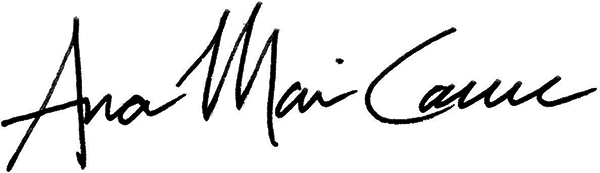
- Signature
- Scientific career
- Fields: Clinical psychology
- Institutions: University of Delaware; University of Washington
- Thesis: Early adolescents’ social networks and networking (1984)
- Doctoral advisor: Edmund Gordon

Ana Mari Cauce (/ˈkaʊseɪ/ KOW-say; born January 11, 1956) is an American psychologist, who served as the 33rd president of the University of Washington from October 2015 to July 2025.

Joining the University of Washington faculty as an associate professor in 1986, Cauce chronologically served as director of the undergraduate honors program from 2000 to 2002, as chair of the department of psychology from 2002 to 2005, as executive vice provost from 2005 to 2008, as dean of the College of Arts and Sciences from 2008 to 2011, and as the university's provost and executive vice president from 2011 to 2015.

== Early life and education ==
Cauce was born in Havana, Cuba, to Vincente Cauce Carrazana, minister of education under Cuban dictator Fulgencio Batista, and Ana Cauce (née Vivanco). When she was three years old, her family fled the island during the Cuban Revolution. She grew up in Miami, Florida, where her father, who held a PhD, worked first as a custodian. Eventually both parents worked in a shoe factory. Her older brother César, a graduate of Duke University and a member of the Communist Workers Party, was murdered by members of the Ku Klux Klan and National Socialist Party of America in the 1979 Greensboro Massacre.

Cauce received a Bachelor of Arts, summa cum laude, with a major in English from the University of Miami in 1977. She received a Master of Science in 1979, a Master of Philosophy in 1982, and a Doctor of Philosophy in 1984, all in psychology from Yale University.

Her doctoral studies concentrated on child clinical and community psychology. Her doctoral advisor at Yale University was Edmund Gordon.

== Career ==
Cauce began her teaching career as a lecturer at the University of Delaware. In 1986, she moved to Seattle to work as an associate professor at the University of Washington, where she gained tenure in 1990. In 1996, she was named chair of the American Ethnic Studies department. Cauce then was appointed the Director of the Honors Program. She later became Dean of the University of Washington College of Arts and Sciences. In 2007, Cauce helped launch The Husky Promise, a tuition-funding program at the university. In 2012, she became Provost of the University of Washington.

On October 13, 2015, Cauce was appointed as the 33rd president of the University of Washington by the Board of Regents. She had served as interim president since March 2015, when her predecessor Michael Young announced his departure. She is the first permanent female president and the first person of Hispanic ethnicity to hold the position. In 2017, the university settled a public records lawsuit related to the selection of Cauce. Cauce was elected fellow of the American Academy of Arts and Sciences in 2020.

On June 12, 2024, Cauce announced that she would step down from the presidency in June 2025. On February 3, 2025, the University of Washington Board of Regents announced that Robert J. Jones, who was then serving as the 10th chancellor of the University of Illinois Urbana-Champaign, would succeed Cauce, effective August 1, 2025.

== Personal life ==
Cauce is married to Susan Joslyn, her partner since 1989. Both are professors in the Department of Psychology at the University of Washington.

== Selected publications ==
- Cauce, Ana Mari (1984). Early Adolescents' Social Networks and Networking: Contributions to Social Competence (Thesis/dissertation). New Haven, CT: Yale University. OCLC 36818123.
- Cauce, Ana Mari; Hannan, Keith; Sargeant, Marion (December 1992). "Life stress, social support, and locus of control during early adolescence: Interactive effects". American Journal of Community Psychology. 20 (6): 787–798. doi:10.1007/BF01312608. PMID 1302449. S2CID 45098762.
- Gonzales, Nancy A.; Cauce, Ana Mari; Mason, Craig A. (August 1996). "Interobserver Agreement in the Assessment of Parental Behavior and Parent-Adolescent Conflict: African American Mothers, Daughters, and Independent Observers". Child Development. 67 (4): 1483–1498. doi:10.1111/j.1467-8624.1996.tb01809.x. PMID 8890496.
- Tyler, Kimberly A.; Hoyt, Dan R.; Whitbeck, Les B.; Cauce, Ana Mari (June 2001). "The Impact of Childhood Sexual Abuse on Later Sexual Victimization among Runaway Youth". Journal of Research on Adolescence. 11 (2): 151–176. doi:10.1111/1532-7795.00008.
- Paradise, Matthew; Cauce, Ana Mari (December 2002). "Home Street Home: The Interpersonal Dimensions of Adolescent Homelessness". Analyses of Social Issues and Public Policy. 2 (1): 223–238. doi:10.1111/j.1530-2415.2002.00039.x.
