= Lee Paul Sieg =

Lee Paul Sieg (October 7, 1879 – October 8, 1963) was the 20th president of the University of Washington from 1934 to 1946.

Sieg was born in Marshalltown, Iowa. Sieg received his masters in physics in 1901 and his doctorate in philosophy in 1910 from the University of Iowa. Prior to his arrival at the University of Washington in 1934, he served as the Dean of the School of Education at the University of Pittsburgh.

As university president, he oversaw the University of Washington during World War II. The war froze much of the school's physical expansion, but after the war the university launched a $31.5 million building binge to accommodate the influx of new students. Prior to Sieg's retirement, the university opened its school of dentistry in 1945. The medical school opened in October 1946.

To the great credit of Sieg and his administration, the University of Washington was particularly responsive to the plight of its Nisei students during the months leading up to the internment of Japanese Americans. With the internment looming, Sieg took an active leadership role in advocating for the transfer of Nisei students to universities and colleges outside the West Coast to help them avoid the mass incarceration authorized by the signing of Executive Order 9066.

Sieg died in 1963 in Seattle, Washington.
