= List of presidents of the University of Washington =

President of the University of Washington
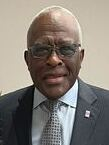
- Incumbent; Robert J. Jones since August 1, 2025
- University of Washington
- Residence: Hill-Crest
- Appointer: Board of Regents
- Formation: November 4, 1861
- First holder: Asa Mercer
- Salary: $714,300
- Website: uw.edu/president/

The president of the University of Washington is the chief administrator of the University of Washington.

The University of Washington is a public university in Seattle, Washington. Established in 1861 and originally known as the Territorial University of Washington, UW is the oldest public university in the state of Washington. The university offers bachelor's, master's and doctoral degrees through its 140 departments, organized into various colleges and schools. For the 2025–26 academic year, the University of Washington had a total enrollment of 63,736 students across its three campuses, including 46,079 undergraduates. UW is one of the largest universities in the United States.

The longest-serving president of the university was the 27th president William P. Gerberding, who held the office for 16 years from 1979 to 1995.

The current president of the University of Washington is Robert J. Jones. Jones is the university's first African American president and assumed his position as the university's permanent president on August 1, 2025. Jones is the thirty-fourth president of the university. Twenty-six men and one woman have served as the university's permanent president, and seven men and three women have served as its interim president pending the appointment of a permanent successor.

== List of presidents ==
The following individuals have held the Office of President of the University of Washington. There are gaps in the line of succession when the university was closed from 1867–1869 and part of 1874 and 1876 Acting university presidents are marked with an asterisk.

The following persons had led the University of Washington since 1861 as president:

| No. | Image | Name | From | To | Ref. |
|---|---|---|---|---|---|
| 1 | | Asa Mercer | 1861 | 1863 | |
| 2 | | William Edward Barnard | 1863 | 1866 | |
| 3 | | George F. Whitworth | 1866 | 1867 | |
| — | Office vacant | | | | |
| 4 | | John Henry Hall | 1869 | 1872 | |
| 5 | | Eugene Kincaid Hill | 1872 | 1874 | |
| 6 | | Mary W. "May" Thayer* | 1874 | 1874 | |
| — | Office vacant | | | | |
| 7 | | George F. Whitworth | 1874 | 1876 | |
| — | Office vacant | | | | |
| 8 | | Alexander Jay Anderson | 1877 | 1882 | |
| 9 | | Leonard Jackson Powell | 1882 | 1887 | |
| 10 | | Thomas Milton Gatch | 1887 | 1895 | |
| 11 | | Mark Walrod Harrington | 1895 | 1897 | |
| 12 | | William Franklin Edwards | 1897 | 1897 | |
| 13 acting | | Charles Francis Reeves* | 1897 | 1898 | |
| 13 | | Frank Pierrepont Graves | 1898 | 1902 | |
| 14 | | Thomas Franklin Kane | 1902 | 1914 | |
| 15 acting | | Henry Landes* | 1914 | 1915 | |
| 16 | | Henry Suzzallo | 1915 | 1926 | |
| 17 acting | | David Thomson | 1926 | 1927 | |
| 18 | | Matthew Lyle Spencer | 1927 | 1933 | |
| 19 acting | | Hugo Winkenwerder | 1933 | 1934 | |
| 20 | | Lee Paul Sieg | 1934 | 1946 | |
| 21 | | Raymond B. Allen | 1946 | 1951 | |
| 22 acting | | H.P. "Dick" Everest | 1952 | 1952 | |
| 23 | | Henry Schmitz | 1952 | 1958 | |
| 24 | | Charles Odegaard | 1958 | 1973 | |
| 25 acting | | Philip W. Cartwright | 1973 | 1974 | |
| 26 | | John R. Hogness | 1974 | 1979 | |
| 27 | | William P. Gerberding | July 1, 1979 | August 31, 1995 | |
| 28 | | Richard Levis McCormick | September 1, 1995 | October 25, 2002 | |
| interim | | Lee L. Huntsman | November 16, 2002 | November 21, 2003 | |
| 29 | | Lee L. Huntsman | November 21, 2003 | June 13, 2004 | |
| 30 | | Mark Emmert | June 14, 2004 | September 30, 2010 | |
| 31 interim | | Phyllis Wise | October 1, 2010 | June 30, 2011 | |
| 32 | | Michael K. Young | July 1, 2011 | March 1, 2015 | |
| interim | | Ana Mari Cauce | March 2, 2015 | October 13, 2015 | |
| 33 | | Ana Mari Cauce | October 13, 2015 | July 31, 2025 | |
| 34 | | Robert J. Jones | August 1, 2025 | Present | |

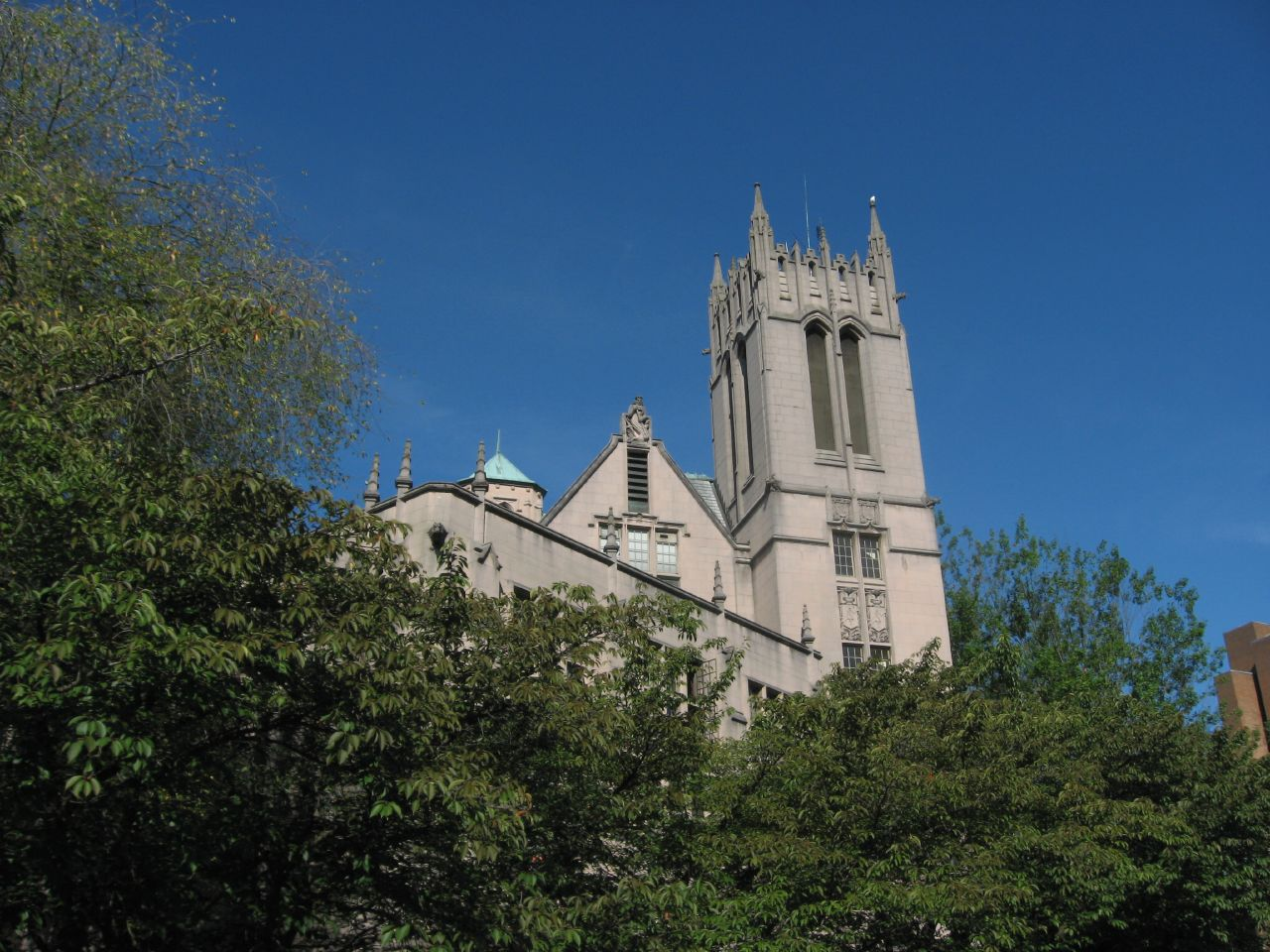
Gerberding Hall, location of the university president's office.

== Timeline of University of Washington presidential terms ==
Presidents of the University of Washington

== See also ==
- History of the University of Washington
- List of University of Washington people
- Washington Huskies
