= Havidán Rodríguez =

American sociologist and university president (born 1959)

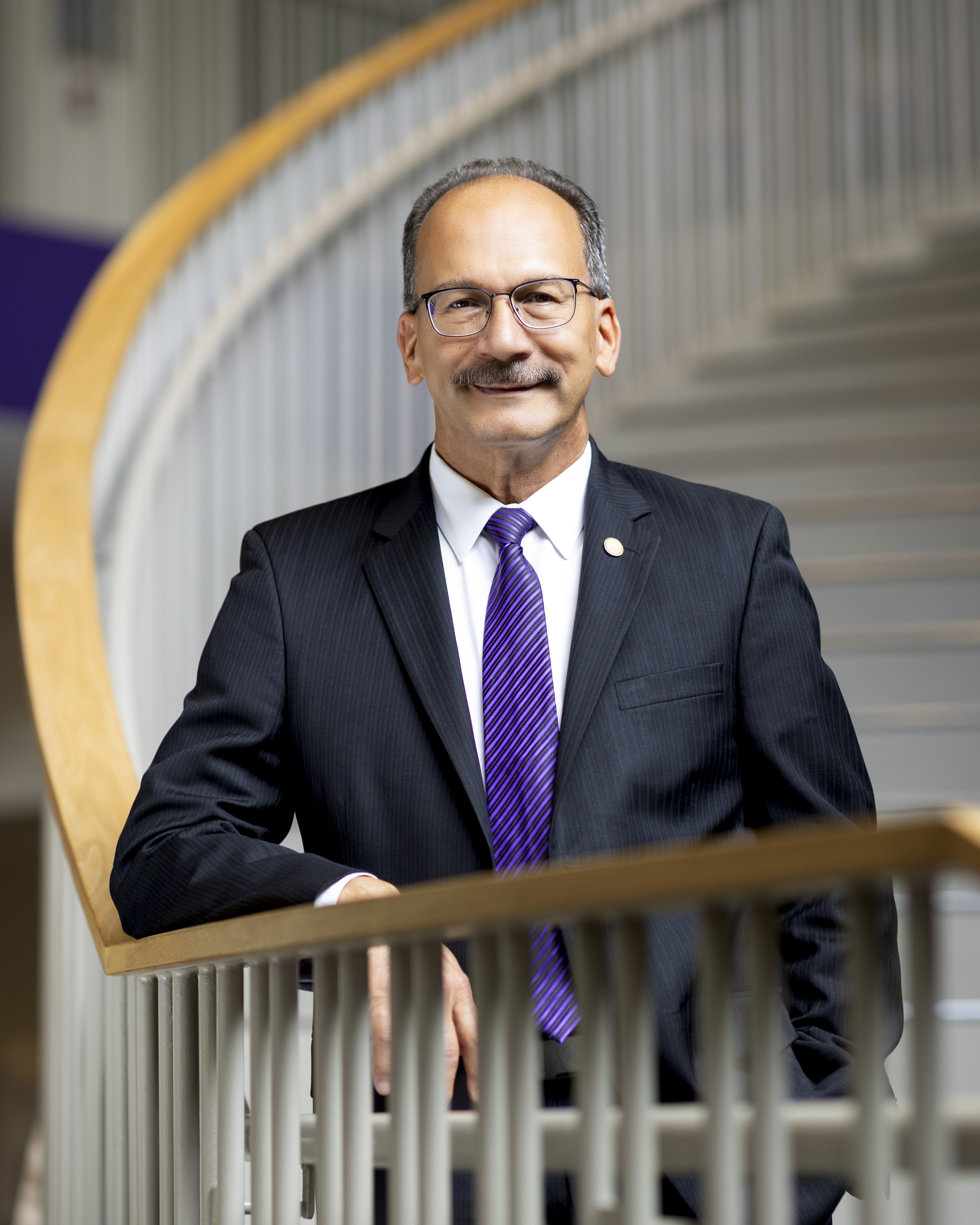
- Havidán Rodríguez, 2024

20th President of the State University of New York at Albany
- Incumbent
- Assumed office September 11, 2017
- Preceded by: Robert J. Jones

Personal details
- Born: February 24, 1959 (age 67) Arecibo, Puerto Rico
- Spouse: Rosy Lopez
- Education: University of Maryland, College Park (BA); University of Wisconsin–Milwaukee (MS); University of Wisconsin–Madison (PhD)

Academic background
- Thesis: Household composition, employment patterns and economic well-being: Puerto Ricans in the United States and Puerto Rico, 1970–1980 (1991)

Academic work
- Discipline: Sociology
- Institutions: University of Puerto Rico; University of Delaware; The University of Texas–Pan American; The University of Texas Rio Grande Valley; University at Albany, SUNY

Havidán Rodríguez (born February 24, 1959, in Arecibo, Puerto Rico) is an American sociologist and academic administrator who has served as president of the University at Albany, SUNY since 2017. He previously held leadership positions at the University of Texas Rio Grande Valley, the University of Texas–Pan American, and the University of Delaware.

== Early life and education ==
Rodríguez was born in Arecibo, Puerto Rico and grew up moving between Puerto Rico and the Bronx in New York City. In New York City, his mother worked as a taxi driver to support Rodríguez and his siblings.

He completed high school with a specialization in automobile mechanics and later joined the United States Air Force, where he served as an emergency medical technician. While in the Air Force, he earned a bachelor's degree in psychology from the University of Maryland, College Park.

He later received a master's degree in sociology from the University of Wisconsin–Milwaukee and a Ph.D. in sociology from the University of Wisconsin–Madison.

== Career ==
Following faculty and administrative appointments at the University of Puerto Rico at Mayagüez, Rodríguez held several leadership roles in higher education. He served as deputy provost and vice provost for academic affairs and international programs at the University of Delaware, where he also directed the Disaster Research Center. He later became provost and vice president for academic affairs at the University of Texas–Pan American and subsequently served as interim president. In 2015, he was appointed founding provost and executive vice president for academic affairs at the University of Texas Rio Grande Valley (UTRGV), where he helped oversee the academic transition following the merger that created the institution.

On June 21, 2017, Rodríguez was named the 20th president of the University at Albany, SUNY by the State University of New York Board of Trustees, becoming the first Latino president of a SUNY four-year institution in New York State. He assumed office in September 2017.

In 2022, Rodríguez was appointed by President Joe Biden to the Advisory Commission on Advancing Educational Equity, Excellence, and Economic Opportunity for Hispanics, and later served as vice chair of the commission.

In 2023 under Rodríguez, the College of Nanoscale Science and Engineering was reintegrated into the university, forming the College of Nanotechnology, Science, and Engineering. During his tenure, the university also launched AI Plus, an initiative supporting interdisciplinary artificial intelligence research, new academic programs, industry partnerships, and state-supported computing infrastructure.

== Research and scholarship ==
Rodríguez’s research focuses on the social science dimensions of disasters, including vulnerability, resilience, and the disproportionate impacts of catastrophic events on low-income and marginalized communities. His field research has included work in Honduras following Hurricane Mitch, in India and Sri Lanka after the 2004 Indian Ocean earthquake and tsunami, along the U.S. Gulf Coast after Hurricane Katrina, and in Puerto Rico following Hurricane Maria.

His scholarship has examined how disasters intersect with poverty, migration, inequality, and public health. During the COVID-19 pandemic, he discussed research examining the disproportionate effects of the virus on Latino communities. He has served as principal investigator on National Science Foundation–funded projects, including a grant focused on gender equity in STEM fields.

He has authored and edited several books, including Population, Migration, and Socioeconomic Outcomes among Island and Mainland Puerto Ricans: La Crisis Boricua (2017), co-authored with Marie T. Mora and Alberto Dávila; Handbook of Disaster Research (2006) and its second edition (2018); and Latinas/os in the United States: Changing the Face of América (2008).

== Boards, honors and awards ==
=== Boards and affiliations ===
Rodríguez has served on the boards of the Association of Public and Land-grant Universities (APLU), Campus Compact, and Excelencia in Education. He has also served on the Presidents and Chancellors Council on Public Impact Research, established by the Pew Charitable Trusts.

Since 2023, he has served as vice chair of the Middle States Commission on Higher Education, with a term extending through 2029.

In New York State, Rodríguez serves as co-chair of the Capital Region Economic Development Council.

=== Honors and awards ===
Rodríguez has received recognition for his scholarship and leadership in higher education and public service.

- FEMA National Disaster Medical System Outstanding Achievement Award (2004)
- Hispanic of the Year: Professional Achievement Award, Latin American Community Center, Delaware (2007)
- Alfredo G. de los Santos Jr. Distinguished Leadership Award, American Association of Hispanics in Higher Education (2015)
- Cesar Estrada Chavez Award, American Association for Access, Equity, and Diversity (2016)
- Man of the Year, New York League of Puerto Rican Women (2018)
- Named to City & State New York’s 50 Over 50 list (2021)
- Inducted into the Capital Region Business Hall of Fame (2024)
- Humanitarian Spirit Award, American Red Cross – Eastern New York (2024)
- Named to City & State New York’s Trailblazers in Higher Education list (2024, 2025)
- Named to PoliticsNY’s Latino Power Players list
- Trailblazer in Higher Education Award, Insight Into Academia (inaugural award, 2026)

Academic offices
Preceded by Robert J. Jones	20th President of University at Albany, SUNY; 2017 – present	Incumbent
