= John R. Hogness =

American physician

John R. Hogness (June 27, 1922 – July 2, 2007) was an American physician. He was the first president of the National Academy of Medicine from 1970 to 1974 and as the 26th president of the University of Washington from 1974 to 1979.

== Biography ==
Hogness was born in Oakland, California, and earned a bachelor's degree and a medical degree from the University of Chicago. He specialized in internal medicine. Hogness was hired at the University of Washington in 1950 and eventually became the first medical director of what is now University of Washington Medical Center. In 1964, he became dean of the University of Washington School of Medicine.
