= George F. Whitworth =

American missionary (1816–1907)

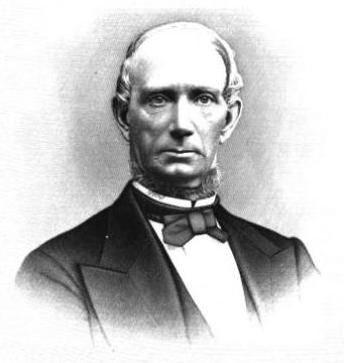
- Whitworth circa 1890

3rd President of the Territorial University of Washington
- In office 1866–1867
- Succeeded by: John Henry Hall

President of the Territorial University of Washington
- In office 1874–1876
- Succeeded by: Alexander Jay Anderson

Personal details
- Born: George Frederick Whitworth; March 15, 1816 Boston, England
- Died: October 6, 1907 (aged 91) Seattle, Washington, U.S.
- Education: Hanover College; New Albany Seminary

George Frederick Whitworth (March 15, 1816 – October 6, 1907) was an American Presbyterian missionary, educated at Hanover College in Indiana. Whitworth worked as a minister in the Ohio Valley until 1853, when he and his family moved to the Western frontier.

In 1867, he co-founded the Lake Washington Coal Company. He was active in the founding of the first church in Grand Mound, Washington, which he co-pastored with J. W. Goodell (father of pioneer Phoebe Judson). He served as the 3rd and the 7th president of the University of Washington from 1866 to 1867 and 1874 to 1876, and was the founder of Whitworth College in 1890.

== Grave ==
He is buried at Lake View Cemetery, Seattle, Washington. His grave is an American Presbyterian and Reformed Historic Site (No. 252) registered by the Presbyterian Historical Society, headquartered in Philadelphia.

== Notes ==
- "George Whitworth biography". Whitworth archives. Whitworth University. Archived from the original on September 5, 2006.
- "Whitworth, George F. (1816-1907)". The Online Encyclopedia of Washington State History. HistoryLink.
- "George Whitworth (1816-1907)". Find A Grave Memorial.
- Guide to the George F. Whitworth Papers 1816-1907
