= Robert J. Jones =

American crop physiologist (born 1951)

Robert Jones
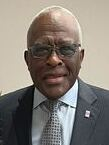
- Jones in 2023

34th President of the University of Washington
- Incumbent
- Assumed office August 1, 2025
- Preceded by: Ana Mari Cauce

10th Chancellor of the University of Illinois Urbana-Champaign
- In office September 26, 2016 – June 30, 2025
- Preceded by: Phyllis Wise
- Succeeded by: Charles Lee Isbell Jr.

19th President of the State University of New York at Albany
- In office January 1, 2013 – September 30, 2016
- Preceded by: George Philip
- Succeeded by: Havidan Rodriguez

Personal details
- Born: 1951 (age 74–75) Dawson, Georgia, U.S.
- Spouse: Lynn Hassan Jones
- Children: 5
- Education: Fort Valley State University (BS); University of Georgia (MS); University of Missouri (PhD)
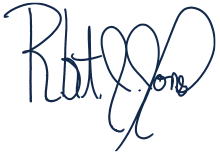
- Signature
- Scientific career
- Fields: Agronomy
- Institutions: University of Minnesota; State University of New York at Albany; University of Illinois Urbana-Champaign; University of Washington
- Thesis: Yield components, respiration, and photosynthesis of contrasting genotypes of tall fescue (1978)

Robert James Jones (born 1951) is an American crop physiologist who has been the 34th president of the University of Washington since August 2025.

He served as the 10th chancellor of the University of Illinois Urbana-Champaign from September 2016 to June 2025 and as the 19th president of the State University of New York at Albany from January 2013 to September 2016.

== Education ==
Jones received a bachelor's degree in agronomy from Fort Valley State College in Georgia, a master's degree in crop physiology from the University of Georgia, and a doctorate in crop physiology from the University of Missouri.

== Career ==
=== University of Minnesota ===
Jones worked at the University of Minnesota for 34 years in many positions: a professor in agronomy and plant genetics, executive vice provost, and senior vice president for academic administration from 2004 to 2013. The University of Minnesota's Urban Research and Outreach-Engagement Center was named after Jones.

=== State University of New York at Albany ===
Following his career at the University of Minnesota, Jones served as the president of the State University of New York at Albany from 2013 to 2016. During his tenure, he created the College of Engineering and Applied Sciences.

==== 2016 racial assault hoax ====
Jones made national headlines for presiding over a racial hoax that was reported as a race-motivated assault against three African-American women on January 30, 2016, on a campus bus. Based upon a police report at the time, Jones firmly declared in a public announcement that "early this morning, three of our students were harassed and assaulted while riding a bus in Albany. I am deeply concerned, saddened and angry about this incident. There is no place in the UAlbany community for violence, no place for racial intolerance and no place for gender violence.". Later video evidence showed that the trio was not assaulted and were instead aggressors in the incident. Students and observers criticized Jones as rushing to judgement, while Jones refused to apologize stating that he made his remark based upon the police report at that time. Jones later announced that the university expelled two of the students and suspended the third for violating the student code of conduct.

=== University of Illinois Urbana-Champaign ===
On July 19, 2016, Jones was named the 10th chancellor of the University of Illinois Urbana-Champaign, with approval of the Board of Trustees at its July 21 meeting. With his chancellorship appointment, Jones also received a tenured faculty position at the Department of Crop Sciences at the College of Agricultural, Consumer, and Environmental Sciences at the University of Illinois Urbana-Champaign.

On November 13, 2024, Jones announced he would be leaving the chancellorship on June 30, 2025, subsequently becoming president of the University of Washington.

=== University of Washington ===
On February 3, 2025, the University of Washington Board of Regents named Jones as the incoming 34th president of the University of Washington, succeeding Ana Mari Cauce, under a five-year contract beginning August 1, 2025.

== Personal life ==
Jones is married to Lynn Hassan Jones, a musculoskeletal diagnostic radiologist doctor of medicine, and they have five children and grandchildren. Jones was a tenor singer in Sounds of Blackness, a vocal ensemble from the Minneapolis–Saint Paul metropolitan area that sings gospel, soul, and R&B.

== See also ==
- List of chancellors of the University of Illinois Urbana–Champaign
- List of University at Albany people

Academic offices
Preceded by George M. Philip	19th President of University at Albany, SUNY; 2013–2016	Succeeded by Havidan Rodriguez
Preceded by Phyllis Wise	10th Chancellor of University of Illinois at Urbana-Champaign; 2016–2025	Succeeded by Charles Lee Isbell Jr.
Preceded by Ana Mari Cauce	34th President of University of Washington; 2025–present	Incumbent
