= Center for Women in Government and Civil Society =

Research center in the United States

Center for Women in Government & Civil Society
- Company type: Research Center
- Founded: 1978
- Headquarters: Albany, New York, United States
- Key people: Dina H. Refki, D.A. Executive Director
- Website: Center for Women in Government & Civil Society

The Center for Women in Government & Civil Society (CWGCS) is a policy research center at the Rockefeller College of Public Affairs and Policy, University at Albany (SUNY). CWGCS was founded in 1978, and is a member organization of The National Council for Research on Women.

== History ==
CWGCS, founded in 1978, is the first university-affiliated research center dedicated to women's issues in the United States. Linda Tarr-Whelan, former United States Ambassador to the United Nations Commission on the Status of Women and former deputy assistant to United States President Jimmy Carter, co-founded CWGCS with Nancy Perlman, CWGCS' first executive director.

== Mission ==
CWGCS "seeks to deepen and broaden political access and economic opportunities for women by strengthening the capacity of government, nonprofit and business sectors to implement gender-responsive, inclusive and equitable policies, practices and services." CWGCS has four focus areas: 1) women in leadership, 2) economic security, 3) health systems and gender-based disparity, and 4) safety and wellbeing.

== Research ==
CWGCS conducts research on gender issues of local, national, and international concern. CWGCS studies have included evaluations of gender equity in the American judiciary, women's influence in American state legislatures and state agencies, women's political leadership attainment in the developing world, and gender-based disparities in healthcare.

CWGCS research has been supported through grants by the United States Department of Education, National Institutes of Health (NIH), United States Department of State (DoS), the Ford Foundation, W.K. Kellogg Foundation, Charles H. Revson Foundation, and other government agencies, private foundations, and non-profit organizations.

=== 2012 U.S. Presidential Election ===
During the second U.S. presidential debate, Mitt Romney defended his gender-equity record by citing a 2004 CWGCS study that ranked Massachusetts first in the percentage of women holding senior leadership roles in state government. Romney's remarks inspired the "binders full of women" controversy.

== Women's Leadership Academy ==
The Women's Leadership Academy (WLA), launched in 2010, operates educational programs aimed at "[strengthening] participants' self-efficacy, leadership capacity and capabilities." WLA programs seek to instill "knowledge of policy-making processes and ways women can influence these processes; leadership ethics, principles and approaches of women political and policy leaders; understanding of how political campaigns are organized and run; recognition of the critical importance of diversity in enriching democratic political participation; skills in community organizing and advocacy; and commitment to advancing women's leadership on a personal and collective level."

CWGCS is a member of the National Education for Women's Leadership Network (NEW).

=== Fellowship on Women in Public Policy ===
The flagship program of the Women's Leadership Academy is the Fellowship on Women in Public Policy. The fellowship awards six-month placements in the New York State Legislature, New York State agencies, or statewide nonprofit advocacy organizations, and provides academic coursework, workshops, conferences, and other professional and leadership development experiences. The fellowship is open primarily to graduate students and working professionals, and has graduated over 300 fellows since its inception in 1983.

=== NEW Leadership New York ===
NEW Leadership New York (NYNL) is a competitive leadership development program for undergraduate women in New York State. The week-long program provides training and education in leadership principles, political strategy, campus mobilization, and community organizing, and connects program participants with women leaders through networking and speaking events.
