= Mark Walrod Harrington =

American scientist (1848–1926)

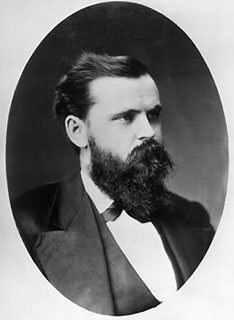

33rd President of the University of Washington
- In office 1895–1897
- Preceded by: Thomas Milton Gatch
- Succeeded by: William Franklin Edwards

Personal details
- Born: August 18, 1848 Sycamore, Illinois, U.S.
- Died: September 10, 1926 (aged 78)
- Scientific career
- Workplaces: University of Michigan

Mark Walrod Harrington (August 18, 1848 – September 10, 1926) was an American scientist who studied and published works in multiple disciplines, including botany, astronomy, meteorology, and geology. He was the first chief of the United States Weather Bureau, and later served as the 11th president of the University of Washington. Considered a prominent scientist in the late 19th century, he knew a half-dozen languages. His academic achievements were overshadowed, however, by his disappearance in 1899, when he left home one day and was not heard from for many years. His wife and son located him in 1908 at a psychiatric hospital in New Jersey where he had been admitted as patient John Doe No. 8.

== Biography ==
Born in Sycamore, Illinois, Harrington was the son of James Harrington and Charlotte Walrod Harrington. In 1874, he married Rose Martha Smith, with whom he had two sons, the first of whom died in 1876. Their second son, Mark Raymond Harrington, was born in 1882 and became a well-known archaeologist.

From 1879 to 1891, Harrington was professor of astronomy and director of the Detroit Observatory of the University of Michigan in Ann Arbor. During this time, he published an astronomical observation recorded by Johan Ludvig Emil Dreyer as NGC 7040 in the New General Catalogue. He founded The American Meteorological Journal in 1884, of which he published the first seven volumes.

In 1891, Harrington was appointed by President Benjamin Harrison as the first chief of the United States Weather Bureau, after it became a civilian agency under the United States Department of Agriculture. He served in this role until 1895, when he was ousted by Secretary of Agriculture J. Sterling Morton, who convinced newly inaugurated President Grover Cleveland to let him fire Harrington.

In 1895, he was elected president of the University of Washington, succeeding Thomas Milton Gatch. He remained in this office until 1897.

Harrington left his home one evening in 1899 and disappeared for about 10 years, with his wife and son having no idea of his whereabouts. Then, in 1908, his son came across a newspaper article about a mysterious man who was admitted to the State Asylum for the Insane at Morristown, in Morris Plains, New Jersey. This man, known as John Doe No. 8, turned out to be the elder Harrington. According to news accounts, Harrington had lost his memory but after several years at the psychiatric institution in Morris Plains, developed a fondness for music. He never left the institution and died there on September 10, 1926.
