= University at Albany =

Public university in Albany, New York, US

Coordinates: 42.686°N 73.824°W

State University of New York at Albany
- Former names: State Normal School (1844–1890); New York State Normal College (1890–1914); New York State College for Teachers (1914–1959); State University of New York College of Education at Albany (1959–1961); State University College at Albany (1961–1962)
- Motto: Sapientia et sua et docendi causa (Latin)
- Motto in English: "Wisdom, both for its own sake and for the sake of teaching"
- Type: Public research university center
- Established: May 7, 1844; 182 years ago
- Parent institution: State University of New York
- Accreditation: MSCHE
- Academic affiliations: ORAU; USU
- Endowment: $197.3 million (2025)
- Chancellor: John B. King Jr.
- President: Havidán Rodríguez
- Students: 17,426 (fall 2025)
- Undergraduates: 12,889 (fall 2025)
- Postgraduates: 4,537 (fall 2025)
- Location: Albany, New York, United States
- Campus: 1,421 acres (5.75 km^{2}); Small city
- Other campuses: Rensselaer; Guilderland
- Newspaper: Albany Student Press
- Colors: Purple and gold
- Nickname: Great Danes
- Sporting affiliations: NCAA Division I FCS – America East; MAAC; CAA Football
- Mascot: Great Danes
- Website: albany.edu

The State University of New York at Albany (also known as University at Albany, UAlbany, or SUNY Albany) is a public research university in Albany, New York, United States. Founded in 1844, it is one of four "university centers" of the State University of New York (SUNY) system, and the most senior (oldest) by date of founding. In 2024, the university enrolled 17,567 students in nine schools and colleges, which offer over 50 undergraduate majors and over 150 graduate degree programs. Portions of the campus extend into Guilderland, and the health sciences campus is located in neighboring Rensselaer, New York. It is classified among "R1: Doctoral Universities – Very high research spending and doctorate production". UAlbany is home to the New York State Writers Institute.

== History ==
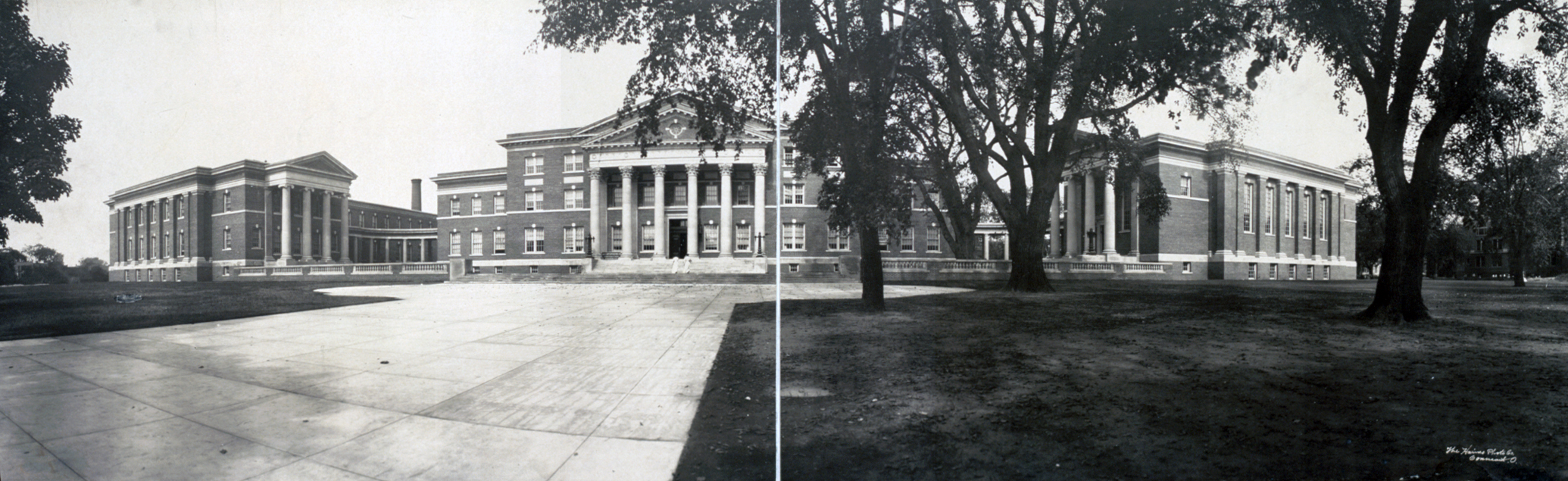
New York State Normal College on Western Avenue in 1909

The University at Albany was an independent state-supported teachers' college for most of its history until SUNY was formed in 1948. The institution began as the New York State Normal School (or Albany Normal School) on May 7, 1844, by a vote of the State Legislature. Beginning with 29 students and four faculty in an abandoned railroad depot on State Street in the heart of the city, the Normal School was the first New York State-chartered public institution of higher education.

Originally dedicated to training New York students as schoolteachers and administrators, by the early 1890s it had become the New York State Normal College at Albany and, with a revised four-year curriculum in 1905, was the first public institution of higher education in New York to be granted the power to confer the bachelor's degree.

A new campus—today, UAlbany's Downtown Campus—was built in 1909 on a site of 4.5 acres (18,000 m^{2}) between Washington and Western avenues. By 1913, the institution was home to 590 students and 44 faculty members, offered a master's degree for the first time, and bore a new name—the New York State College for Teachers at Albany. Enrollment grew to a peak of 1,424 in 1932. By this time, the college had developed a curriculum similar to those found at four-year liberal arts colleges, but it did not abandon its primary focus on training teachers.

In 1948 the State University of New York system was created, with the College for Teachers and the state's other teacher-training schools serving as the nuclei. SUNY, including the Albany campus, became a manifestation of the vision of Governor Nelson A. Rockefeller, who wanted a public university system to accommodate the college students of the post–World War II baby boom. To do so, he launched a massive construction program that developed more than 50 new campuses. Reflecting a broadening mission, the College for Teachers changed its name to SUNY College of Education at Albany in 1959. In 1961, it became a four-year liberal arts college as the State University College at Albany.

In 1962, the State University College was designated a doctoral-degree granting university center. The same year, Rockefeller broke ground for the current Uptown Campus on the former site of the Albany Country Club. The new campus' first dormitory opened in 1964, and the first classes on the academic podium in the fall of 1966. By 1970, enrollment had grown to 13,200 and the faculty to 746. That same year, the growing protest movement against the Vietnam war engulfed the university when a student strike was called for in response to the killing of protesters at Kent State. In 1985, the university added the School of Public Health, a joint endeavor with the state's Department of Health.

In 1983, the New York State Writers Institute was founded by Pulitzer Prize-winning author William Kennedy. As of 2013, the Institute had hosted more than 1,200 writers, poets, journalists, historians, dramatists, and filmmakers. The list includes eight Nobel Prize winners, nearly 200 Pulitzer Prize and National Book Award winners, several Motion Picture Academy Award winners and nominees, and numerous other prize recipients.

During the 1990s, the university built a $3 billion, 450,000-square-foot (42,000 m^{2}) Albany NanoTech complex, extending the Uptown Campus westward. By 2006, this addition became home to the College of Nanoscale Science and Engineering, which in 2014 merged with the State University of New York Institute of Technology in Utica, New York, to become a separate SUNY institution: the SUNY Polytechnic Institute. This was reversed in 2023, when the college rejoined UAlbany as part of the College of Nanotechnology, Science, and Engineering.

In 1996, a third campus—the East Campus, renamed the Health Sciences Campus in 2016—was added 12 miles (19 km) east of the Uptown Campus in Rensselaer County.

In 2004, the university launched the College of Nanoscale Science and Engineering (CNSE), the first college in the nation to focus exclusively on nanotechonology, semiconductor development and chip manufacturing. In 2014, the college merged with SUNY IT to become SUNY Polytechnic Institute. In 2023, CNSE was reunified with UAlbany to form the College of Nanotechnology, Science, and Engineering.

In 2005, the university created a College of Computing and Information, with faculty on both the Uptown and Downtown campuses. In the fall of 2015, the college was replaced and its programs incorporated into the College of Engineering and Applied Sciences. At the same time, the university opened another new college, the College of Emergency Preparedness, Homeland Security and Cybersecurity.

In 2016, the university launched its first undergraduate degree in computer engineering as part of the newly formed College of Engineering & Applied Sciences. The college later added undergraduate and graduate programs in electrical and computer engineering, environmental and sustainable engineering along with preexisting programs in computer science.

On June 21, 2017, Havidan Rodriguez, founding provost of the University of Texas Rio Grande Valley and former interim president of the University of Texas-Pan American, was named the 20th president of the university, a position he assumed in September 2017. Rodríguez became the first Hispanic/Latino president of any of the four-year SUNY campuses.

=== Name changes ===
Name	Period
State Normal School	May 1844 – March 1890
New York State Normal College at Albany	March 1890 – April 1914
New York State College for Teachers at Albany	April 1914 – September 1959
State University of New York College of Education at Albany	September 1959 – October 1961
State University College at Albany	October 1961 – June 1962
State University of New York at Albany	June 1962 – present

== Campuses ==
=== Uptown Campus ===
The Uptown Campus, the university's main campus, is located mostly in Albany, with a small portion (a dorm "quad" and the athletics complex) spilling into the McKownville neighborhood in the neighboring town of Guilderland (official address: 1400 Washington Avenue in Albany). Its visual effect has been described as "Dazzling one-of-a-kind" by architectural critic Thomas A. Gaines, who called it "a formal masterpiece" and "a study in classical romanticism." Designed in 1961–1962 by noted American architect Edward Durell Stone and constructed from 1963 to 1964, the campus bears Stone's signature style that includes towers, domes, fountains, colonnades, canopies, and other features typical for the era. Stone's campus layout emphasizes residential quadrangles, also known as "quads", surrounding the academic buildings.

At the hub of the Uptown Campus is the rectangular "Academic Podium", featuring 13 three-story buildings under a single overhanging canopy roof. The Podium's showpiece is a central pool with fountains and an off-center circular bell tower, or "Carillon", which also serves as a water storage reservoir. In April 2012, the university undertook a complete renovation of the main fountain and water tower area, as well as of the Campus Center fountain. There is LED lighting in the base of the fountain, and a new, more interactive center element with seating areas. Completion of the project is scheduled for fall 2013.

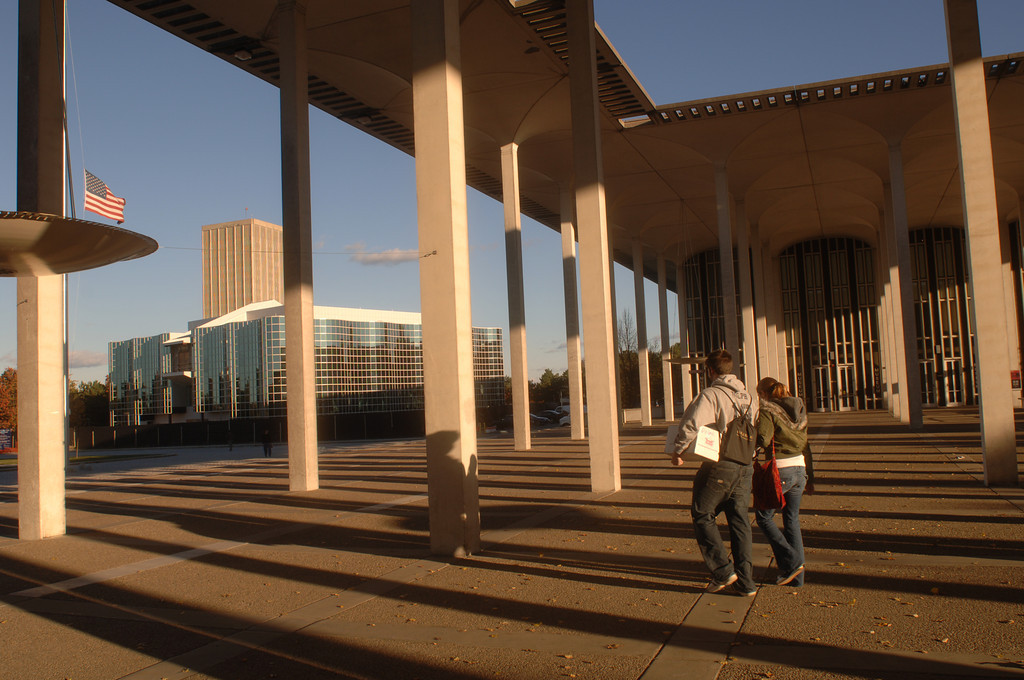
A portion of the Academic Podium of the Uptown Campus

The domed Main Library, the Performing Arts Center, and Campus Center face the pool from the west, east and south, respectively. The Campus Center was under construction from Spring 2015 and was finally completed Fall of 2017 adding more space and dining options for students. To the north is a grand entrance, which welcomes visitors by way of a "great lawn" (Collins Circle) and the university's Entry Plaza. Four residential quadrangles are located adjacent to the four corners of the academic podium. Each quad consists of a 23-story high-rise dormitory surrounded by a square of low-rise buildings.

On the west end of the Uptown Campus is the university's meteorology and characterization tools, the National Weather Service (NWS), and the Atmospheric Sciences Research Center (ASRC).

In addition to the Main Library, the Uptown Campus became home in 1999 to the third of the three university libraries: the Science Library. Further growth occurred on the Uptown Campus in the fall of 2004, when a new Life Sciences Building opened, dedicated to basic research and education. New residence halls, Empire Commons and Liberty Terrace, opened in 2002 and 2012, housing up to 1,200 and 500 students, respectively, Ground was broken for a new School of Business building in October 2008. The 80,000-square-foot facility, located on the west side of Collins Circle, opened in August 2013.

=== Downtown Campus ===
The Downtown Campus, located at 135 Western Ave., Albany, just one mile (1.6 km) from the New York State Capitol building and Empire State Plaza, is the site of the original New York State College for Teachers. Construction began in 1909 on the first three buildings: Draper, Husted and Hawley halls, after the previous location on Willett Street burned down. Later additions to the campus were Richardson Hall, Page Hall and The Milne School (all in 1929), as well as 1960s' additions to Draper and Richardson halls. Husted Hall underwent major renovations in 2009. A subsequent energy efficiency project at Husted Hall was awarded a High Performance Building Plaque from the New York State Energy Research and Development Authority (NYSERDA).

The Downtown Campus is home to the university's Rockefeller College of Public Affairs and Policy, School of Criminal Justice, and School of Social Welfare. It also houses one of the university's three libraries, the Thomas E. Dewey Graduate Library, located in Hawley Hall.

UAlbany purchased the Old Albany High School, also known as the Schuyler Building, in 2013 and is renovating it as the home for the College of Engineering and Applied Sciences (renamed the College of Nanotechnology, Science, and Engineering in 2023). It will house the Dean's Office as well as the Departments of Computer Science and Electrical & Computer Engineering.

=== Health Sciences Campus ===
The university's 87-acre (350,000 m^{2}) Health Sciences Campus, located in the City of Rensselaer, is home to UAlbany's School of Public Health and the Cancer Research Center (CRC) which opened in 2005. Located also on the campus—which contains 350,000 square feet (33,000 m^{2}) of lab, support and associated office space—is the Center for Functional Genomics, which does research in the areas of microarrays, proteomics, molecular biology and transgenics. Also based at the campus are 15 private biotechnology companies, both established and those which form part of the university's business incubator program. Biopharmaceutical giant Regeneron Pharmaceuticals has a large-scale biologics manufacturing facility adjacent to the campus where it produces investigational products for all its clinical trials.

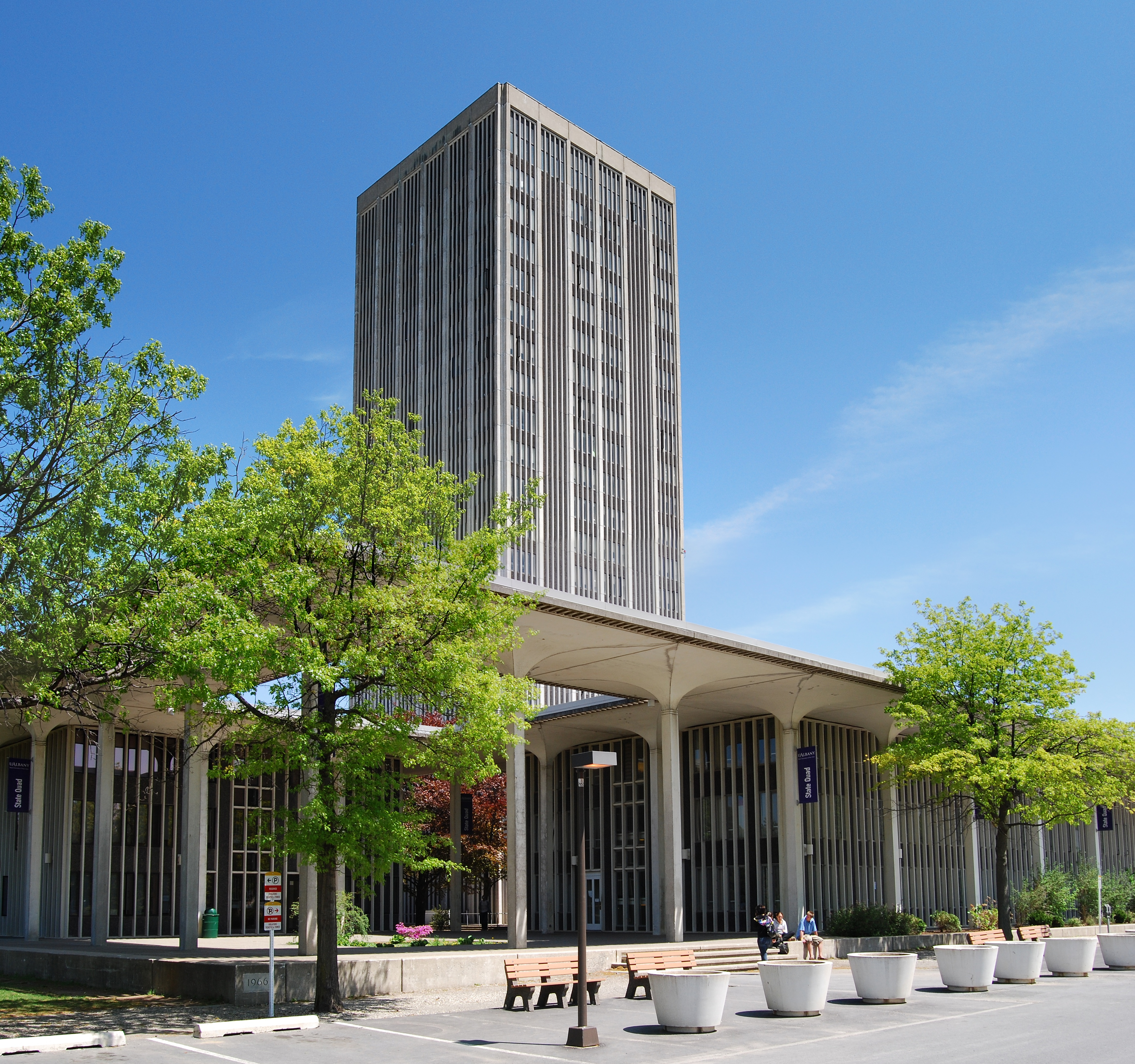
State Quad, one of four quadrangle dormitories on the Uptown Campus

=== Uptown Campus housing ===
The Uptown Campus is home to seven of the university's eight residential complexes. Four of these—Indigenous Quad, Dutch Quad, Colonial Quad, and State Quad—sit at the Academic Podium's corners; each consists of eight three-story, low-rise buildings encircling a 22-story tower with a capacity of 1,200 students each, as well as a game room and fitness center. Originally, each quad consisted of a dining hall but as of the Fall 2017 semester, Dutch Quad and Colonial Quad no longer maintain a dining hall. The four quads serve as a chronological timeline of New York State history, beginning with Indigenous Quad, moving clockwise to Dutch, then Colonial, and finally, State. The other three, Freedom Apartments, Empire Commons, and Liberty Terrace, are reserved for juniors and seniors. These are "apartment-style" residences and include kitchens, furnished living rooms, and, on Empire Commons, washers, dryers, dishwashers, single bedrooms, and central air conditioning. The university's newest apartment-style residential complex, Liberty Terrace, opened in the fall of 2012.

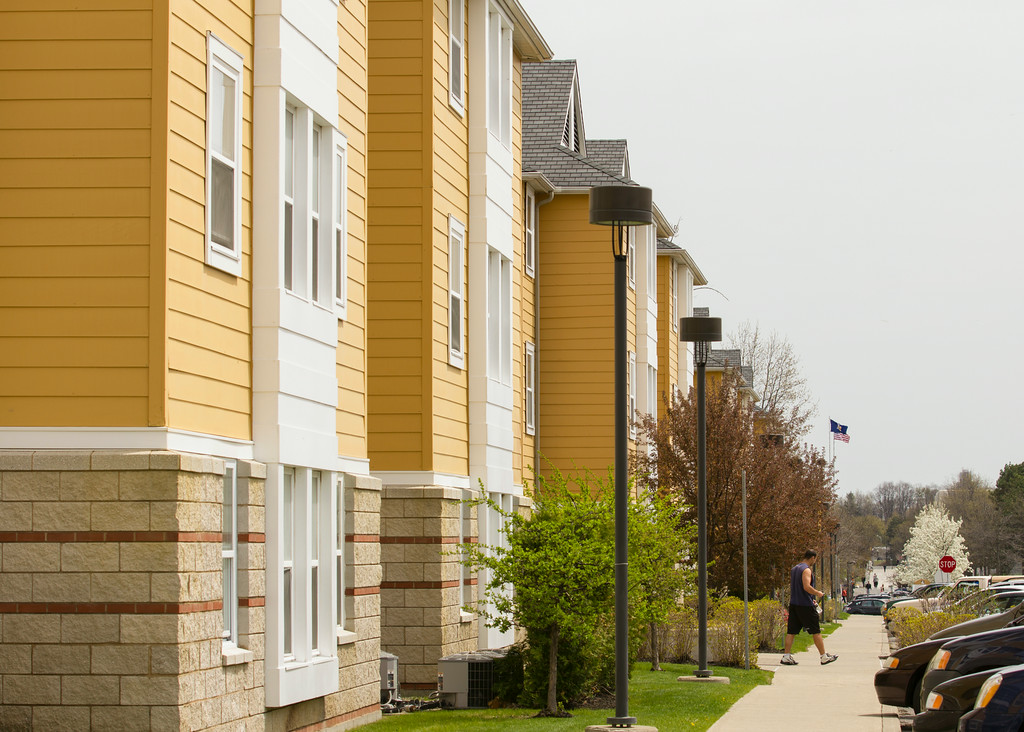
Empire Commons, apartment-style living, on UAlbany's Uptown Campus

The Uptown Campus also contains special housing for students enrolled in UAlbany's Honors College. This housing, offered to incoming freshmen and returning sophomores, is found on State Quad in the Melville and Steinmetz halls, which were renovated in 2010. Renovations were completed on Indigenous Quad during the summer of 2013, State and Alumni Quads are still undergoing work. In March 2021, Indian Quad was renamed to Indigenous Quad following a series of petitions and complaints from students, faculty, and alumni.

== Buildings and facilities ==
=== Campus Center ===
The Campus Center, located on the Uptown Campus Podium, has traditionally been the community center of the University at Albany, serving students, faculty, professional staff, alumni, and guests. Considered the "hearthstone" or "living room" of the campus, the Campus Center has provided services that include lounging areas, cafeterias, a Barnes & Noble bookstore, and national chain eateries operated and staffed by Aramark. The structure has been the site for informal and formal interactions, the latter including the meetings of student-run clubs, academic conferences, and cultural functions.

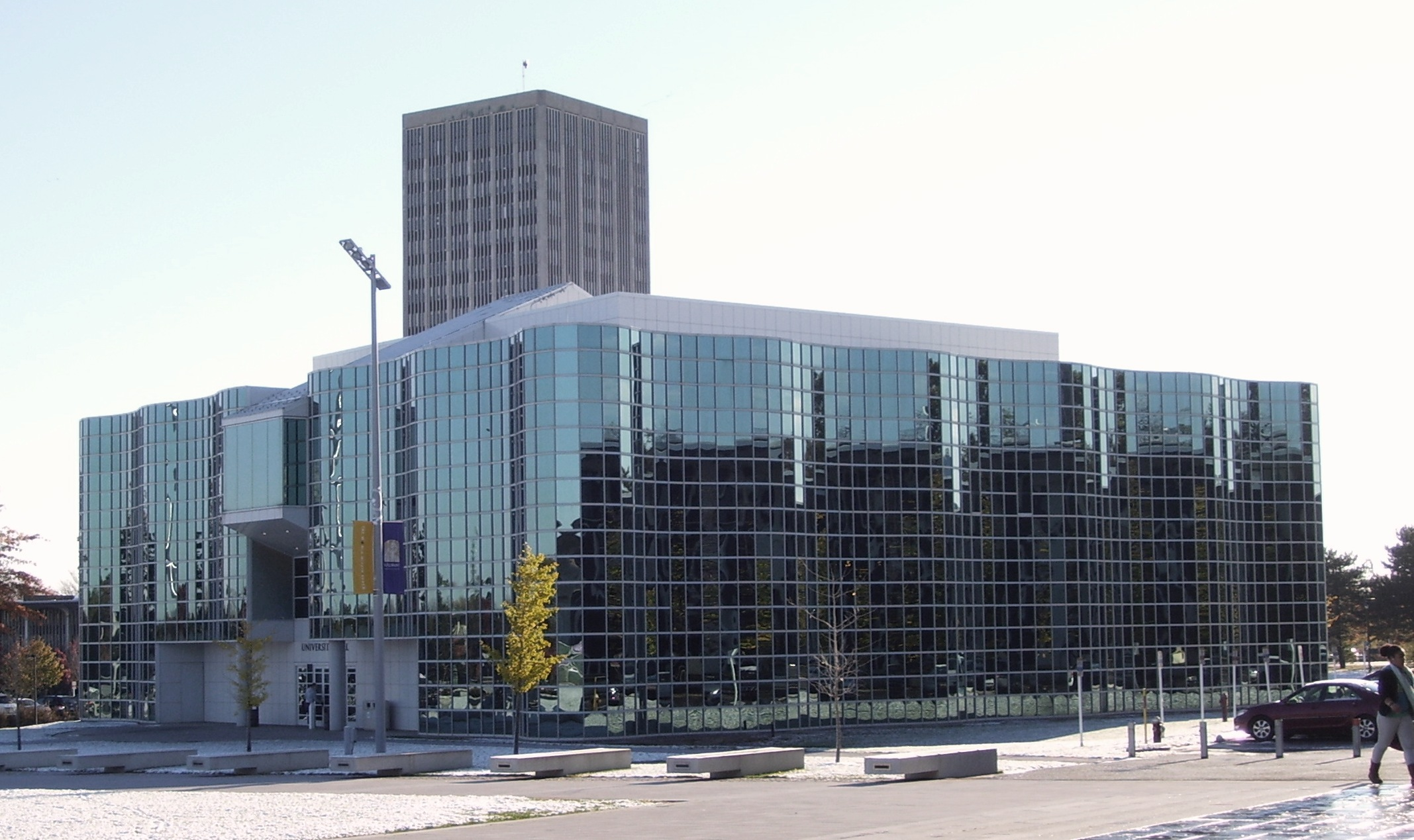
University Hall, UAlbany's administration building, which opened in 2006

=== Performing Arts Center ===
The Performing Arts Center is a facility on the Uptown Campus containing five performance spaces. The Main Theatre is the largest theater space on the Uptown campus, capable of seating 500 people. Designed for music performance, the Recital Hall seats 242 people, 197 on the orchestra level and 45 in the nine circular theater boxes along the periphery on the second level. The Arena Theatre is used primarily for small theater performances and acting classes and seats 196. The Studio Theatre seats 153 people. The Lab Theatre is a 50' square "black box" theater. The Lab can seat up to 200 audience members.

=== University Art Museum at University at Albany ===
The University Art Museum is centrally located on the Uptown Campus. Designed by architect Edward Durell Stone, its interior is an example of late 20th Century modernism. Its three galleries provide more than 9,000 square feet (840 m^{2}) of exhibition space for six to eight changing exhibitions per year.

=== Massry Center for Business ===
Located at the university's grand entry plaza, the Massry Center for Business houses the School of Business. The 96,000-square-foot building features technologically advanced classrooms and meeting spaces, collaborative research centers in technological and social entrepreneurship, studying areas for students, and a trading room equipped with Bloomberg terminals.

=== ETEC ===
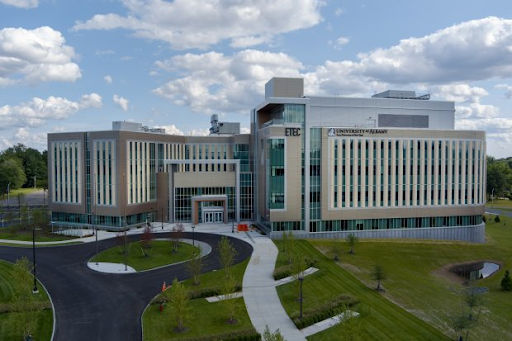
Emerging Technology and Entrepreneurship Complex

In fall 2021, UAlbany unveiled ETEC (Emerging Technology and Entrepreneurship Complex) located on the Eastern portion of the main Uptown campus. The state-of-the-art $180 million research facility is one of the university's largest buildings at 246,000 square feet.

=== The Athletic Complex ===
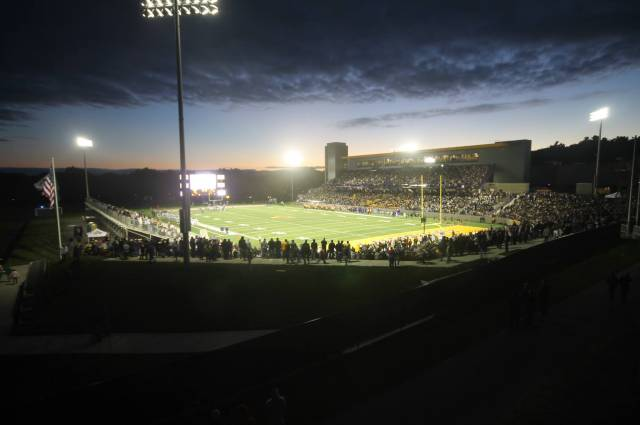
UAlbany played in front of a sold-out crowd of over 11,000 in its inaugural game at Bob Ford Field on September 14, 2013

UAlbany unveiled a new football stadium, Bob Ford Field, on September 14, 2013, as part of a $19 million multi-sport complex. The Great Danes opened against the University of Rhode Island. The stadium, named for the coach who guided the football program to 265 victories from 1973 to 2013, is an 8,500-seat facility which includes a press level with four luxury suites, a print media area, and booths for radio, television, coaches, and replay, as well as 20 high-definition televisions distributed throughout the level. In the summer of 2015, following a multimillion-dollar donation by Tom and Mary Casey, the complex was officially renamed the Bob Ford Field at Casey Stadium.

=== Broadview Arena ===
In the fall of 2023, the university opened Broadview Arena, which had been known as SEFCU Arena since 1992 when the RACC (Recreation and Convocation Center) was renamed. The RACC was an $11 million arena for UAlbany's men's and women's basketball and track teams. It has a 0.11 mile indoor track. They also in 2017 added a $1.4 million scoreboard. The 4,538-seat arena also serves as a major venue for community events such as rock, pop, and hip hop concerts, sporting events and University activities. Although it has an Albany address, it is actually located in the Town of Guilderland.

== Organization ==
The university is a first-tier component of the State University of New York. It receives annual appropriations as a part of the SUNY budget, and the New York State University Construction Fund manages and finances buildings and capital improvements. Although the university is governed by the SUNY Board of Trustees, the university does have a separate 10-member council that is appointed by the governor, with one student-elected member. The governor designates the council's chair.

The university has a separate University at Albany Foundation, which conducts fundraising on behalf of the university. For example, when the new library was built, state funds paid for the construction of the building, but the foundation raised $3.5 million to equip the new facility. The foundation has a Board of Directors, which includes three voting member elected by the faculty and one elected by students.

== Academics ==
The university comprises nine colleges and schools, plus an honors college:

=== College of Arts and Sciences ===
The College of Arts and Sciences, comprising 21 departments, forms the largest academic division at the university. Departments of the College of Arts and Sciences include Africana Studies, Anthropology, Art and Art History, Atmospheric and Environmental Sciences, Biological Sciences, Chemistry, Communication, East Asian Studies, Economics, English, Geography and Planning, History, Languages, Literatures and Cultures, Latin American, Caribbean and U.S. Latino Studies, Mathematics and Statistics, Music and Theatre, Philosophy, Physics, Psychology, Sociology, and Women's, Gender and Sexuality Studies. Undergraduate education consists of 56 majors offered in these areas, along with their paired minors and 17 other minors as well as cooperative interdisciplinary programs that include the arts, humanistic studies, physical sciences and social sciences.

Graduate programs in the College of Arts and Sciences in the humanities and fine arts, science and mathematics, social and behavioral studies, and college-based interdisciplinary majors lead to the following degrees and certificates: Master of Arts, Master of Science, Master of Regional Planning, Master of Fine Arts, Doctor of Philosophy, Certificate of Advanced Standing, Certificate of Advanced Study and the Certificate (in selected fields).

=== College of Nanotechnology, Science, and Engineering ===
The College of Nanotechnology, Science, and Engineering currently has four departments:

- The Department of Computer Science
- The Department of Electrical & Computer Engineering
- The Department of Environmental & Sustainable Engineering
- The Department of Nanoscale Science & Engineering

Undergraduate and graduate (MS and PhD) programs are offered by all four departments. The BS program in Computer Science and BS Program in Electrical & Computer Engineering received ABET accreditation in 2022.

In December 2022, it was announced that the College and UAlbany would be reunifying with the College of Nanoscale Science & Engineering, which had been affiliated since 2014 with SUNY Polytechnic Institute. In August 2023, the reunification was completed and the name of the college was changed from the College of Engineering and Applied Sciences to the College of Nanotechnology, Science, and Engineering.

=== Rockefeller College of Public Affairs and Policy ===
The Rockefeller College of Public Affairs and Policy, created in 1981, was named for former U.S. vice president and governor of New York Nelson Rockefeller. It is home to UAlbany's departments of Political Science and Public Administration and Policy.

While providing educational preparation for academic and public service careers, it undertakes research on public problems and issues, and assists in the continuing professional development of government executives. It offers assistance to the federal and New York State governments, as well as to foreign nations and international organizations, to meet the responsibilities of contemporary citizenship and governance. Such assistance includes special courses and conferences, research and consultation, and publications for the dissemination of information.

The college offers degree programs that range from bachelor's level study in political science and public policy, to master's programs in political science, public administration and public policy, to doctorates in political science and public administration. Research centers within the college include the Center for Legislative Development, the Center for Policy Research, the Center for Women in Government and Civil Society, the Institute for Traffic Safety Management & Research, and the Center for International Development.

=== Massry School of Business ===
UAlbany's Massry School of Business is accredited by the Association to Advance Collegiate Schools of Business (AACSB) in both business and accounting (less than 1.2% of all AACSB programs). It was also the first School to be accredited by AACSB at both undergraduate and graduate levels in 1974. Founded in 1962, the School's bachelor's, master's and certificate programs enroll full-time and part-time students from all over the world.

The Digital Forensics B.S. curriculum and research done at the school's Department of Information Security and Digital Forensics was used to receive dual designation as a NSA Center of Academic Excellence in Cyber Defense Education and Research. Since 2011, the school has also offered a Graduate Certificate in Information Security, which is a 15-credit program.

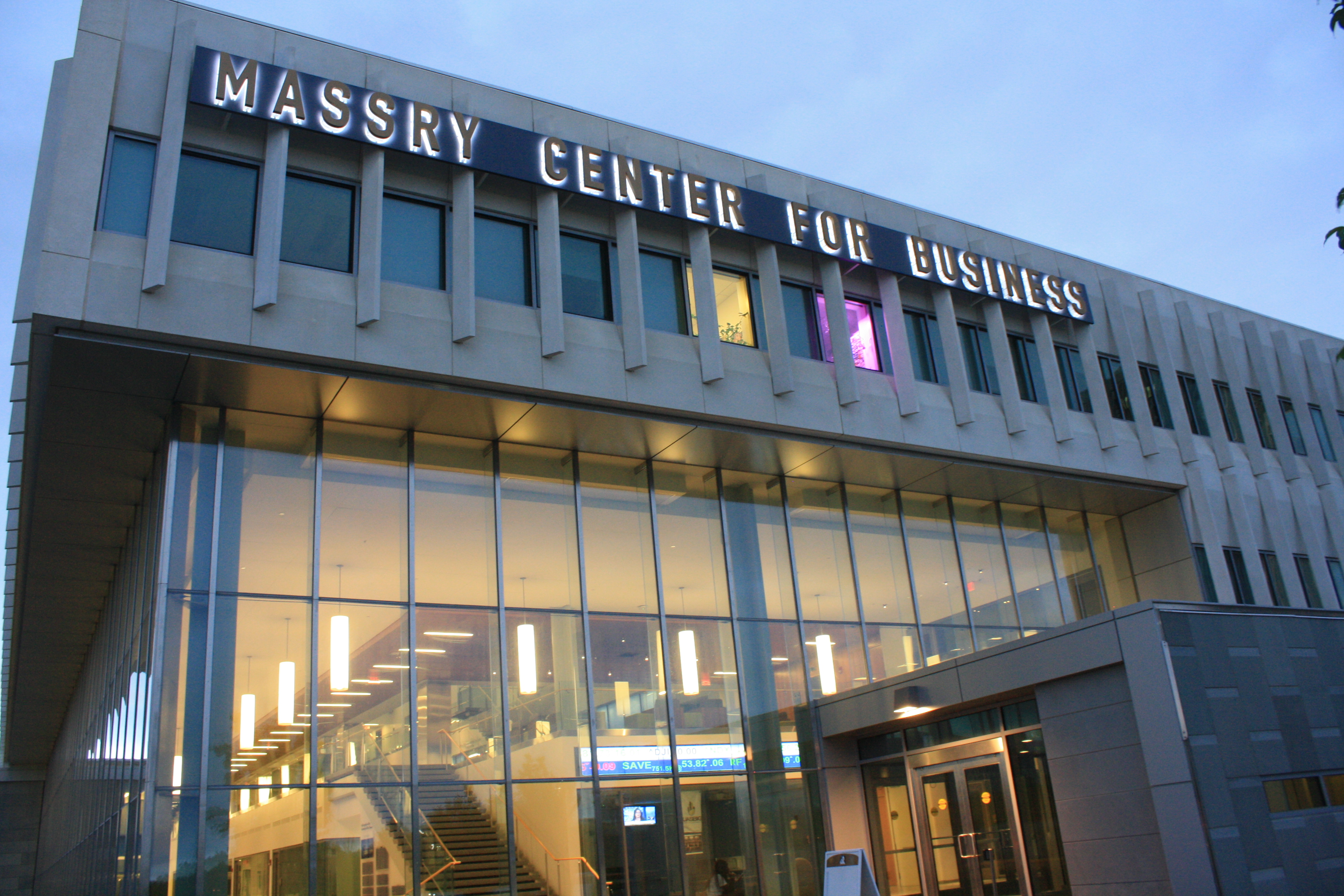
The Massry Center for Business, University at Albany

The Financial Market Regulation program works with the Institute for Financial Market Regulation, a cooperative project of professionals involved in financial market regulation and supervision from UAlbany and Albany Law School who develop interdisciplinary research and education in the field. The program concentrates upon four fields: Business, Technology, Law, and Public Policy.

The Massry Center for Business building was unveiled on August 19, 2013. It was structurally engineered by Leslie E. Robertson Associates.

=== School of Criminal Justice ===
UAlbany's School of Criminal Justice offers programs in criminal justice on the bachelor's, master's and doctoral levels. The school was founded in 1966, and spurred what came to be called "the Albany model" for other Ph.D. programs in major universities across the nation and the world.

The school concentrates on crime and societal reactions to crime, including the political, economic and cultural patterns that influence policy choices on the response to crime. A focus of study is the social and personal forces that lead to criminal conduct and the analysis of the organization and operation of crime control systems. Particular emphasis is placed on the interactions among the many agencies which comprise criminal justice systems.

In 2020, the SCJ was integrated into the Rockefeller College of Public Policy, in order to build stronger interdisciplinary connections between the faculty and students in criminal justice, political science, and public policy & administration.

=== School of Education ===
The university was founded as the New York Normal School of Teachers in 1844 with David Perkins Page as its first principal. It expanded to become the New York State College for Teachers in 1914, and then, in 1962, the State University of New York at Albany. The School of Education was created that year as part of a multidisciplinary university center and remained the home of the original teacher training programs and faculty, including, from 1845 until its closing in 1977, the Milne School, the university's campus laboratory school where prospective teachers carried out their practice teaching.

The school is home to 1,500 graduate students in more than 30 master's, certificate, and doctoral programs housed within four departments: Educational Policy & Leadership, Educational and Counseling Psychology, Educational Theory and Practice, and Literacy Teaching and Learning. The school is also home to 15 centers and institutes which aid Capital Region schools and research educational issues. These include the school's outreach arm, the Capital Area School Development Association, which provides services to 120 school districts; the Center for the Elimination of Minority Health Disparities, which was funded in 2006 by a three-year $1.24 million grant from the National Institutes of Health; the Center for Urban Youth and Technology; and the National Research Center on English Learning & Achievement, which since 1987 has been funded by the U.S. Department of Education to conduct research dedicated to improving students’ English and literacy achievement.

=== College of Emergency Preparedness, Homeland Security and Cybersecurity ===
The College of Emergency Preparedness, Homeland Security and Cybersecurity (CEHC), created in 2015, offers interdisciplinary academic programs for undergraduate and graduate students in fields designed to protect against, respond to, and recover from a growing array of natural and man-made risks and threats in New York State and around the world.

Research will be conducted by CEHC faculty and also through faculty-student collaborations and cross-disciplinary research groups. Training programs will be offered to current homeland security and emergency preparedness professionals.

In 2017, the college participated in the New York Excelsior Challenge, a three-and-a half day training event. The Excelsior Challenge consists of training exercises designed to help first responders improve their response capabilities.

=== College of Integrated Health Science ===
In 2024, the university established the College of Integrated Health Sciences (CIHS), bringing together the former School of Public Health and School of Social Welfare under one college. CIHS has six units, the School of Social Welfare, and the Department of Epidemiology and Biostatistics, Department of Environmental Health Sciences, Department of Biomedical Sciences, Department of Health Policy, Management and Behavior and Department of Nursing.

The School of Public Health, created in 1985 as a partnership between the University at Albany, State University of New York and the New York State Department of Health. Its mission is to provide education, research, service and leadership to improve public health and eliminate health disparities.

Accredited by the Council on Education for Public Health, the school offers MPH, MS, DrPH and PhD degrees in each of four academic departments: Biomedical Sciences; Environmental Health Sciences; Epidemiology & Biostatistics; and Health Policy, Management & Behavior.

Research interests of the more than 200 doctoral-level faculty include AIDS, GIS, maternal and child health, hospital epidemiology, infectious diseases, environmental and occupational health, eldercare, minority health and health disparities. Both research faculty and students benefit from additional affiliations with Albany Medical Center and Bassett Healthcare.

The creation of CIHS was controversial among some faculty members and university governance bodies. While the university described the consolidation as a means of encouraging interdisciplinary research and creating new academic opportunities, critics questioned its academic rationale, the extent of faculty and student participation in the decision-making process, and the replacement of the School of Social Welfare's standalone deanship with a director structure. In October 2023, the University Senate approved a resolution concerning the proposed integration.

=== Rankings ===
Academic rankings

National
- Forbes: 306
- U.S. News & World Report: 121
- Washington Monthly: 51
- WSJ/College Pulse: 188

Global
- ARWU: 501–600
- QS: 901–950
- THE: 501–600
- U.S. News & World Report: 601

National Graduate Program Rankings
Program	Ranking
Biological Sciences	158
Bio-Statistics	61
Business	122 – 133
Chemistry	108
Clinical Psychology	52
Computer Science	120
Criminology	5
Economics	79
Earth Sciences	124
Economics	81
Education	100
Engineering	158
English	80
Fine Arts	135
History	75
Library & Information Studies	29
Mathematics	117
Physics	146
Political Science	81
Psychology	81
Public Affairs	27
Public Health	68
Social Work	43
Sociology	51

The U.S. News & World Report 2025 edition of "Best Colleges" ranked the university tied for 121st among national universities and tied for 61st among public universities.

In its 2022 rankings, Times Higher Education World University Rankings and The Wall Street Journal ranked the university 188th among national universities and 351st-400th among international universities.

The 2022 Forbes "America's Best Colleges" ranking placed Albany at 281st overall among 500 universities, at the 56th percentile of schools that were ranked. This represents a drop of 94 spots from its 2021 ranking at 187.

== Research ==
=== Cancer Research Center ===
UAlbany's Cancer Research Center (CRC) runs research that focuses on the underlying biology associated with tumor initiation and progression, and the development and evaluation of chemopreventive regimens and therapeutic approaches for common cancers. The center fosters the training of graduate students and postdoctoral fellows in cancer biology. Located on the university East Campus in Rensselaer, N.Y., the center combines UAlbany research expertise in genomics and biomedical sciences with technology in a new 117,000-square-foot (10,900 m^{2}) facility.

The center opened in October 2005 with $45 million in support through New York State's Gen*NY*Sis Program. Additional funds currently being raised from the private sector for the center's Fund for Memory and Hope will be used for special equipment and needs of the research program. In September 2009 the Center recruited scientist Ramune Reliene from the University of California Los Angeles to its research team and faculty of the School of Public Health's Department of Environmental Health Sciences. Reliene, who received her doctorate from the Swiss Federal Institute of Technology Zurich in Switzerland, expands the scientific portfolio of the Center in the genetic and environmental causes of cancer.

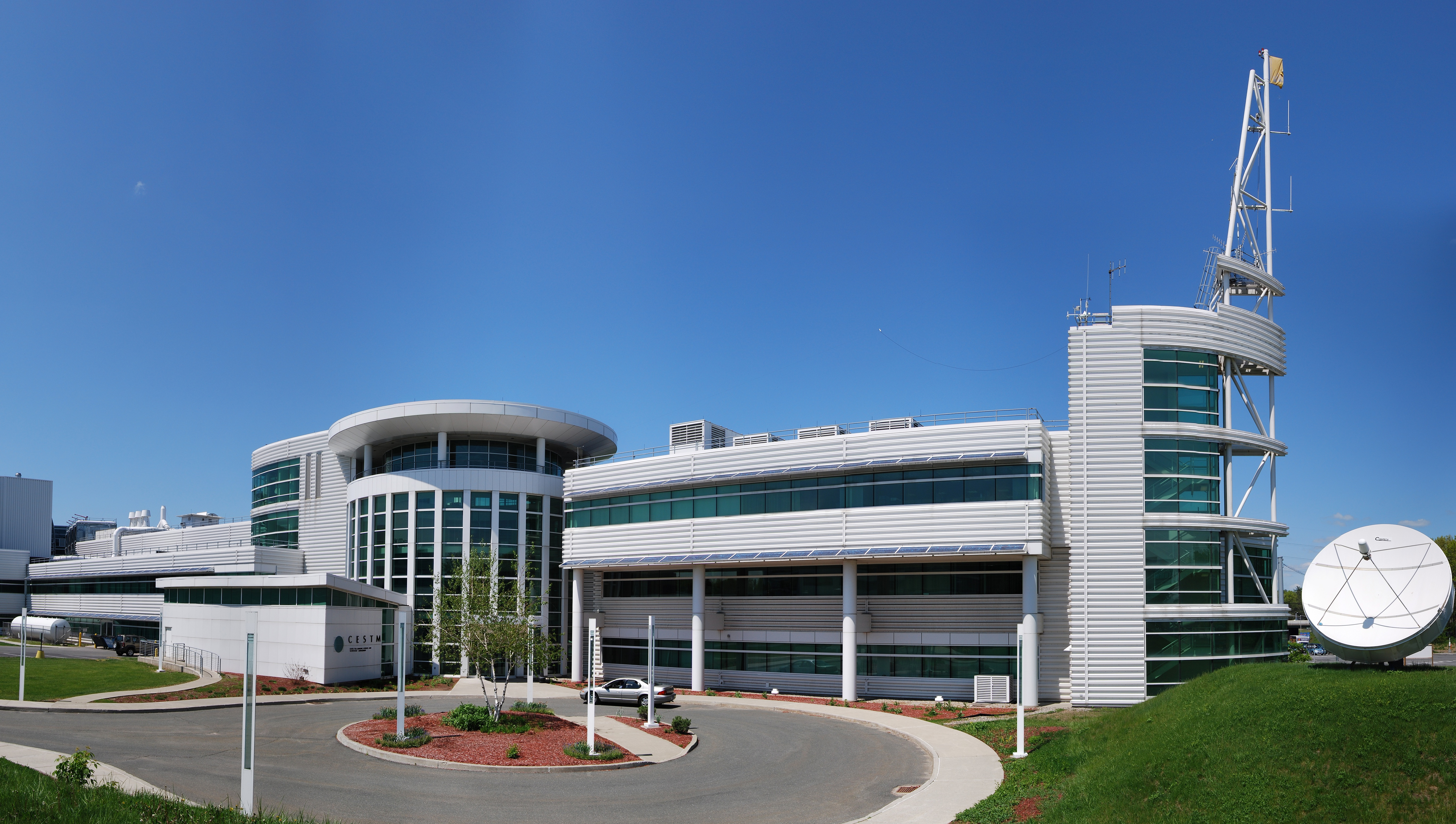
Center for Environmental Science and Technology Management (CESTM)

=== Atmospheric Sciences Research Center ===
The Atmospheric Sciences Research Center (ASRC), based at UAlbany, is a center for research in the atmospheric sciences. Established on February 16, 1961, by the Board of Trustees of the State University of New York, its mission is to promote programs in basic and applied sciences, especially as they relate to the atmospheric environment. The center is connected to and shares faculty and resources with the university's Department of Earth and Atmospheric Sciences.

ASRC performs research to study the physical and chemical nature of the atmosphere and its implications to the environment. Research areas include boundary layers, solar radiation, radiative transfer, atmospheric chemistry, aerosol physics, air quality, solar energy, cloud physics, climate systems, and air quality monitoring. In addition the center has a large "jungle research group" exploring atmosphere and biosphere relationships in the Amazon rainforest, the Alaskan Tundra, the Canadian Boreal Forest, and the Eastern U.S.

=== The Center for Social and Demographic Analysis ===
UAlbany's Center for Social and Demographic Analysis (CSDA) was established in 1981 to provide a research infrastructure for scholarship in the social sciences at the University at Albany, State University of New York. CSDA has since become the nexus for further investments by university administration and state and federal agencies. Positioned by these developments, CSDA joined the roster of NICHD Population Centers in September 1997.

The center offers researchers access to computing facilities and statistical software, computing and statistical consulting, assistance with grant preparation and administration, and other related services. It collaborates with the Lewis Mumford Center—the university institute devoted to urban research—in efforts to disseminate data and fresh analyses of population trends revealed in the census and continuing census-related databases such as the Current Population Survey and the American Community Survey.

CSDA has 41 faculty associates drawn from 15 departments that span the array of academic disciplines at the university. Among major research initiatives sponsored by the center is the Urban China Research Network (funded by the Mellon Foundation), which brings together scholars and graduate students from around the world to study implications of urban change in China. New collaborative projects include initiatives on health disparities and the environmental impacts of metropolitan growth.

=== The RNA Institute ===
On June 4, 2010, the university unveiled a new $12.5 million biomedical research center, The RNA Institute, whose mission would be to form an alliance of genetic scientists and biomedical investigators from New York's Capital Region to spur research and development into RNA and its implications for medicines, drug therapies and technologies, and curing disease. On November 5, 2010, UAlbany announced The RNA Institute had received a $5.37 million grant from the National Institutes of Health/National Center for Research Resources (NIH/NCRR) and $2 million in matching funds from the State of New York to fund the design, engineering and construction of 15,000 square feet (1,400 m^{2}) of research facilities on par with those of modern pharmaceutical companies. On the same day, the institute announced the establishment of The RNA Institute MassSpec Center, dedicated to the development of mass spectrometry-based technologies for investigating the structure-function relationships of natural and synthetic RNA as tools for drug discovery.

== Environmental sustainability ==
Its UAlbany Green Scene initiative is conducted through AT&T grant-funded research. UAlbany researchers study coordination of traffic signals and transportation patterns, with the goals of minimizing car-engine idling times, forging new carpooling connections, and communicating more effectively alternative transportation options to the campus community.

UAlbany and its College of Engineering & Applied Sciences house the only degree programs in the US that focus on both environmental and sustainable engineering.

== Student life ==
Undergraduate demographics as of Fall 2023
Race and ethnicity	Total
White	39%
Black	23%
Hispanic	19%
Asian	10%
Two or more races	4%
International student	3%
Unknown	1%
Economic diversity
Low-income (Note: The percentage of students who received an income-based federal Pell grant intended for low-income students.)	42%
Affluent (Note: The percentage of students who are a part of the American middle class at the bare minimum.)	58%

=== Student Association ===
The University at Albany Student Association is a student run, non-profit, corporation which organizes and funds much of the student oriented activities on campus. The SA funds and recognizes 200 student groups, plans concerts, speaking engagements, and comedy shows. The SA impacts students in the classroom as well, through funding of general education courses. Modeled after the U.S. government, SA consists of three branches: executive, legislative (unicameral Student Association Senate), and judicial (Supreme Court).

The Student Association is funded directly by the undergraduate student body of the University at Albany, State University of New York.

The Student Association owns a 1,000-acre (400 ha) wilderness retreat facility in the Adirondack Mountains called Camp Dippikill.

=== Greek life ===
The University at Albany is currently home to 37 Greek-lettered organizations and six councils. According to Niche, the University at Albany is ranked the #2 Best Greek Life Colleges and the #2 Top Party School in New York State. The party scene at the University at Albany has become more restrained since the Albany Kegs N' Eggs 2011 Riot, where the Pine Hills neighborhood incurred substantial property damage.

=== Safety ===
In 2019, UAlbany was ranked "the least safe college in New York." Among Upstate New York colleges, the university reported the highest number of campus rapes in the region.

=== Student media ===
The Albany Student Press, commonly known as "The ASP", is an independent student-run newspaper. It began as the State College News and has been published continuously since 1916. The newspaper has a circulation of more than 10,000 and serves student body and the surrounding community.

== Athletics ==
University at Albany's intercollegiate athletics date back to the late 1890s, but its development was hampered for several decades by inadequate facilities, uncertain financial support, and the small number of male students in an institution designed to develop elementary school teachers. Tennis remained a constant from 1898 on and men's basketball dates back to 1909, but attempts to field teams in football (1922), baseball (1896–1901), swimming, and ice hockey were aborted.

Expansion into men's and women's sports increased after World War II, and then expanded greatly in the 1960s (men's sports of lacrosse, track and field, cross-country, and swimming moved from club to varsity status, and women's tennis, softball, field hockey, basketball and swimming were introduced), a direct result of the introduction of the new Uptown campus and its expanded athletic facilities. A nickname change also occurred, the Pedagogues becoming the Great Danes—making UAlbany the only American college or university with that mascot. The school's colors are purple and gold.

After the 1972 NCAA restructuring, UAlbany competed in Division III athletics until the 1995–96 school year, when it moved to the Division II level as part of a transition to Division I competition. That process was completed in the fall of 1999; UAlbany now has 19 varsity sports (8 men, 11 women) competing at the Division I level. All athletic programs are run by the university's Department of Athletics and Recreation.

Other than the sport of football, the school's teams have been members of the America East Conference since 2001. Football participates in the Football Championship Subdivision level (formerly Division I-AA). The Danes were an associate member of the Northeast Conference, winning championships in that league in 2002, 2007, 2008, 2011 and 2012. Beginning with the 2013 season, the Danes moved their football program to the Colonial Athletic Association.

On February 15, 2012, university president George Philip announced that a new $24 million athletic and recreational complex would be completed in three phases, consisting of a new synthetic turf field for students (finished in Fall 2012), a combined new football and soccer facility (completed in Fall 2013), and a refurbished track and field venue (finished in Spring 2014). President Philip also announced $6 million fundraising campaign to support the project.

The coach of the UAlbany men's basketball team Dwayne Killing was indicted on January 23, 2023, for 4th degree assault on a player in 2021. The incident took place in the locker room of Eastern Kentucky University in Richmond, Ky., where UAlbany was playing in a tournament. This the second legal action relating to the incident. The player involved filed a lawsuit against Killings, athletic director Mark Benson and the school alleging that Killings "violently and viciously grabbed him, threw him up against a locker and struck him in the face, drawing blood." The suit also alleges that Benson and UAlbany instead of protecting a student as a victim of the assault "showed preference to the assaulter because of his race," violating Title VI of the Civil Rights Act.

== Notable alumni and faculty ==
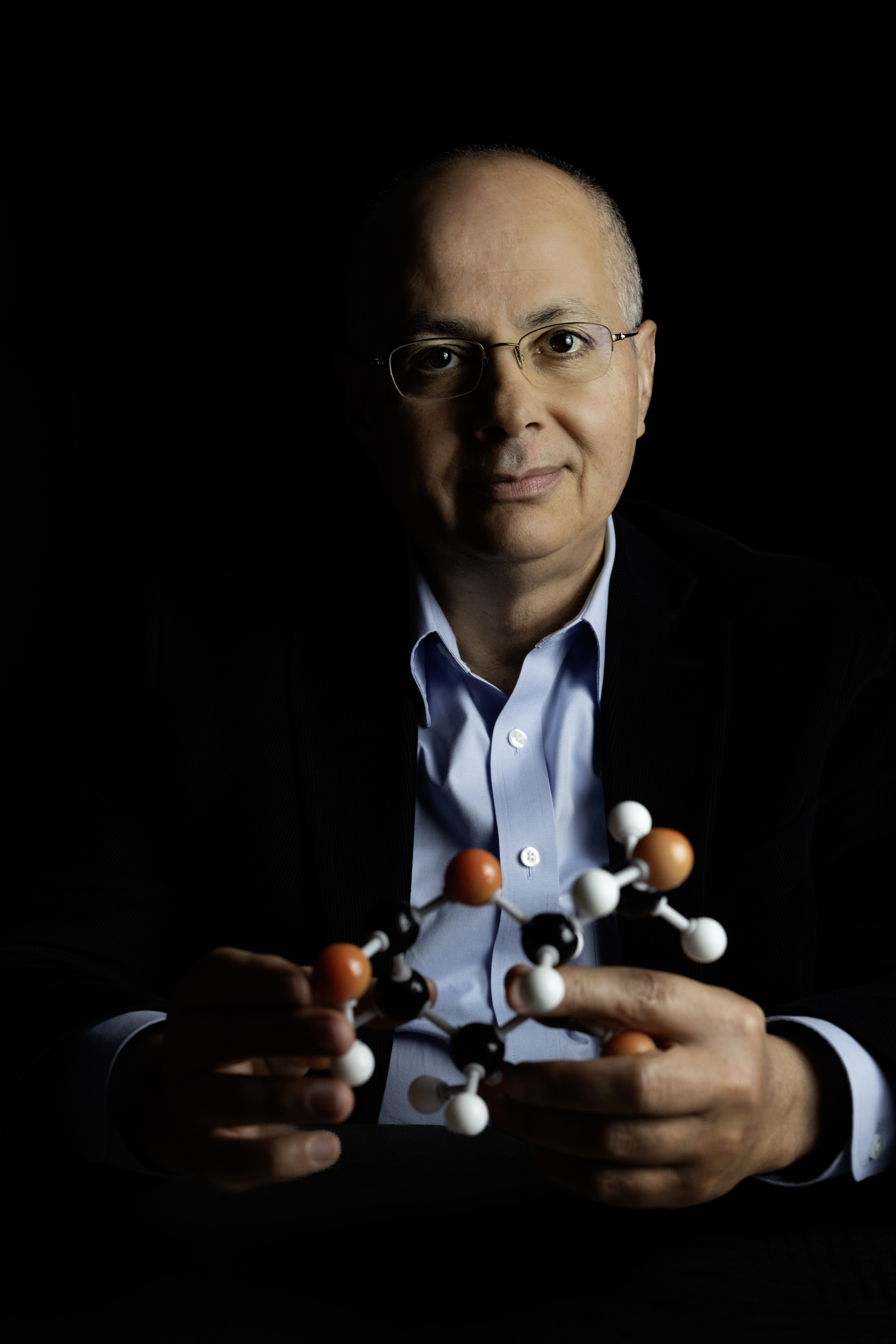
Omar M. Yaghi, Nobel Prize in Chemistry winner (2025)

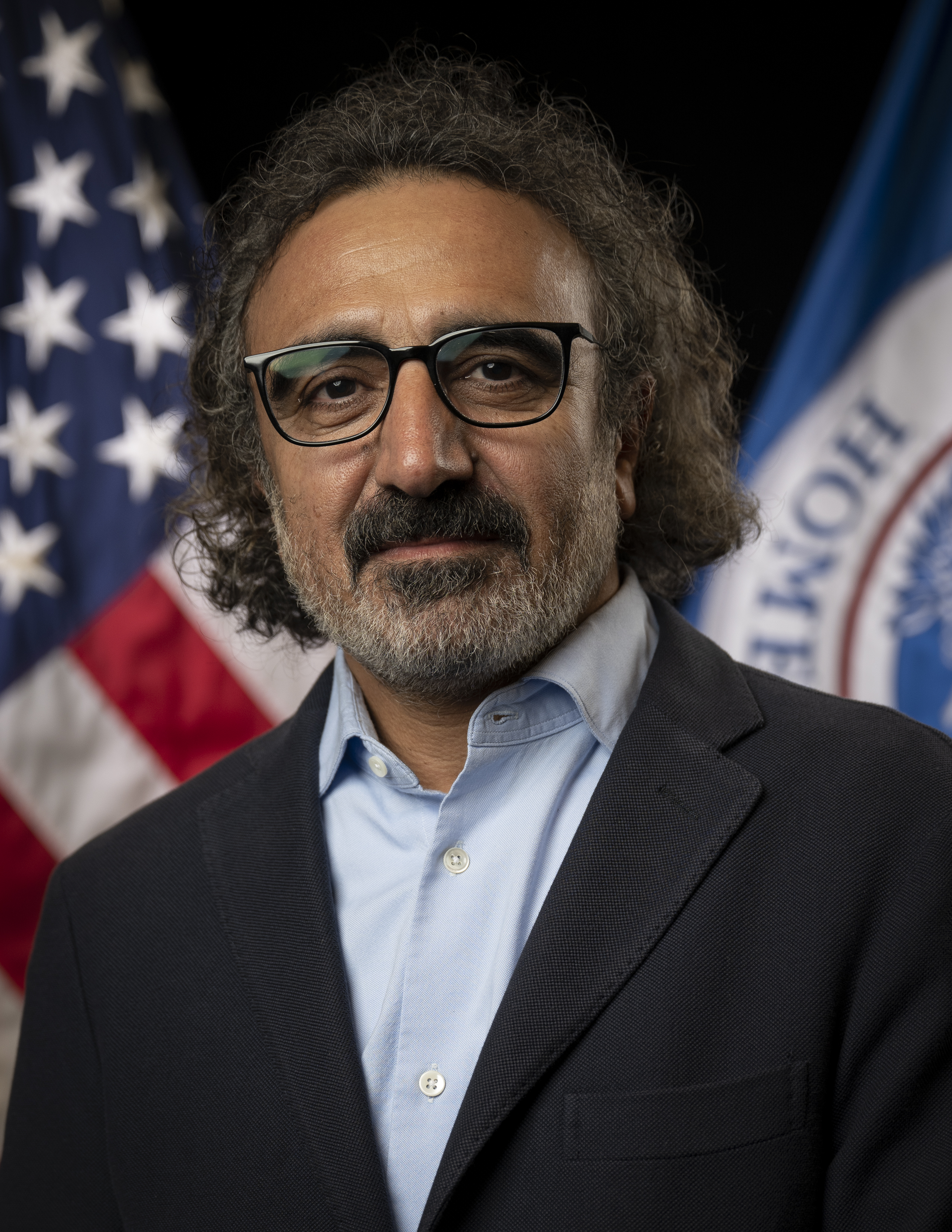
Hamdi Ulukaya, CEO of Chobani

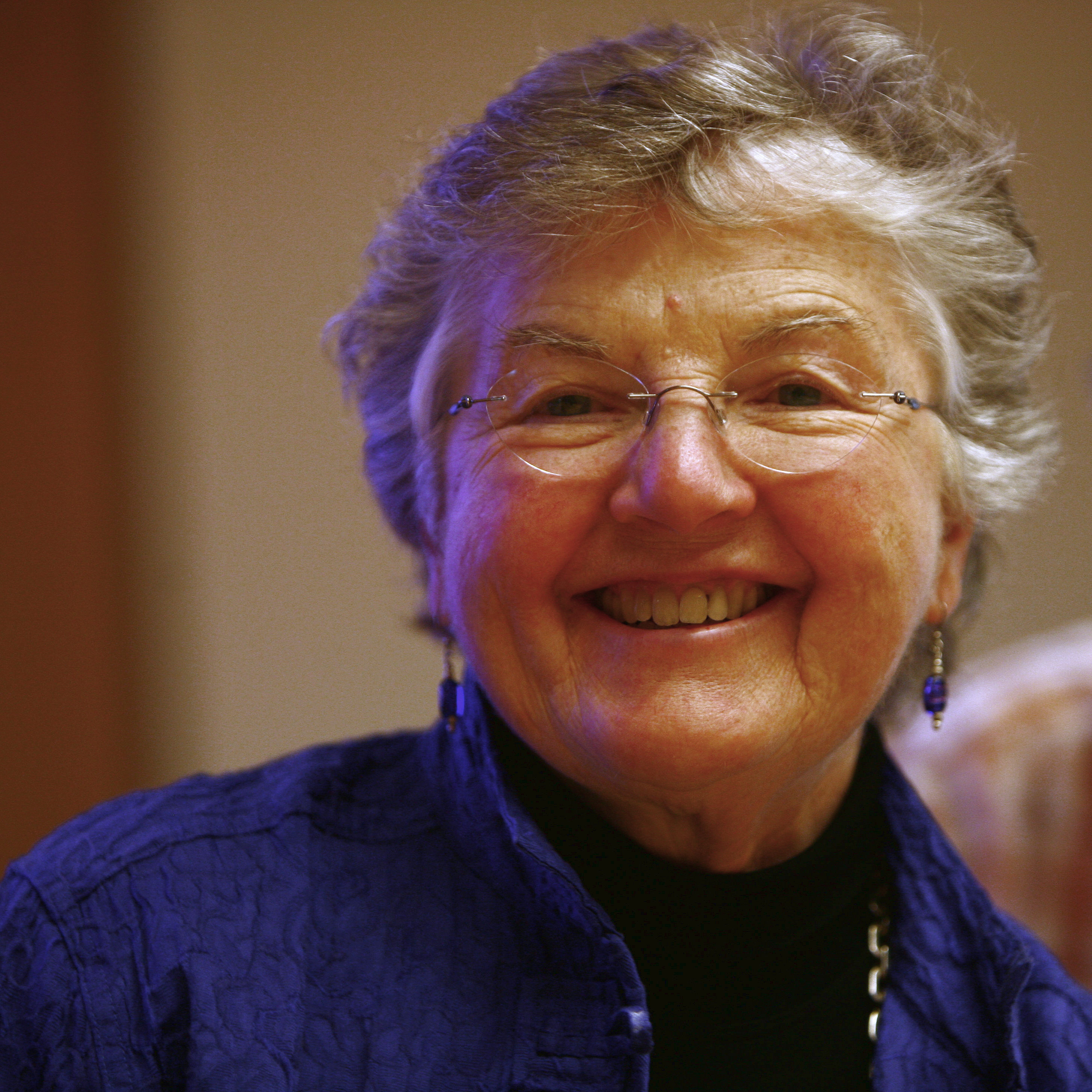
Frances Allen, Turing Award winner (2006)

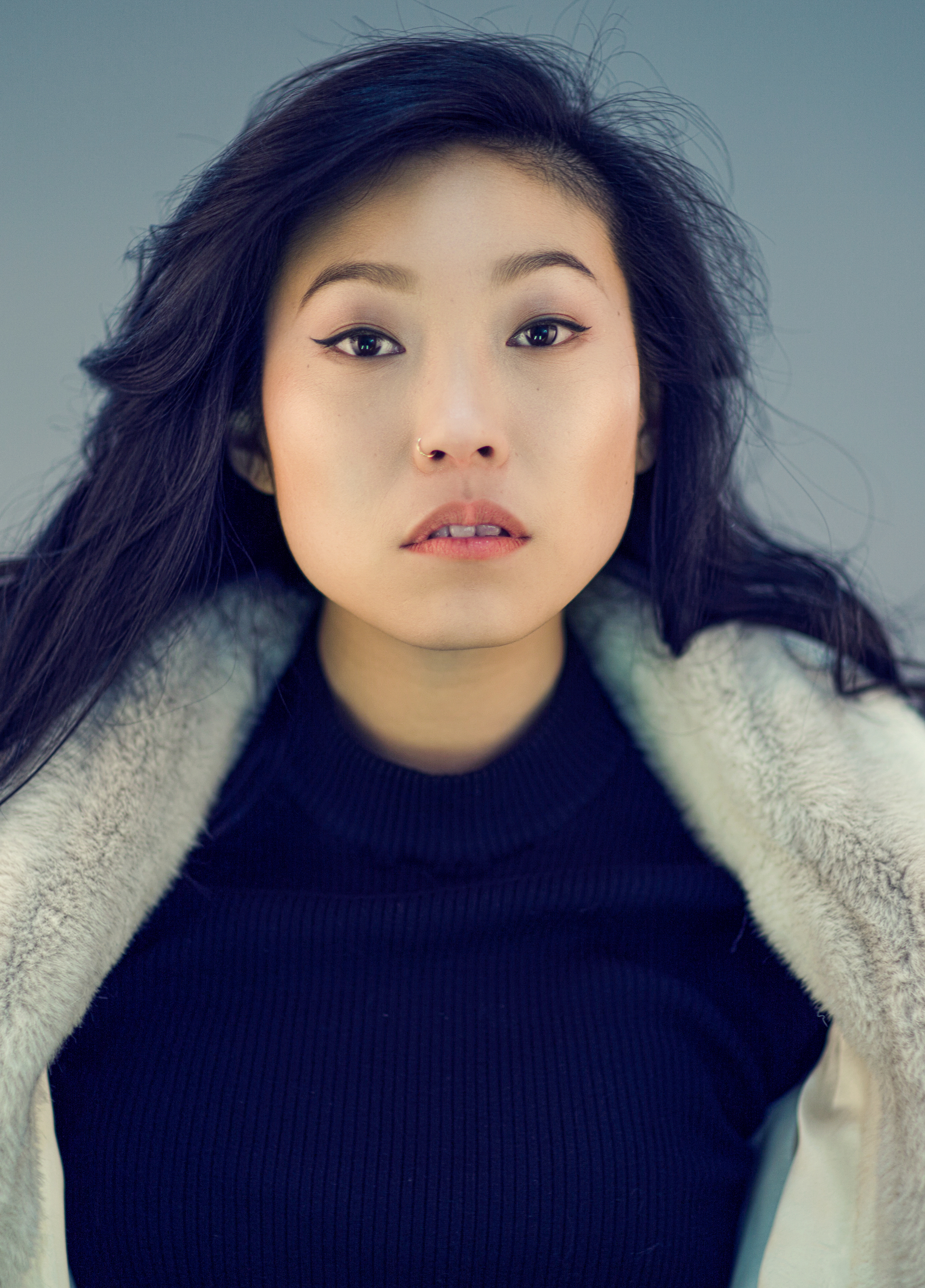
Awkwafina, actress

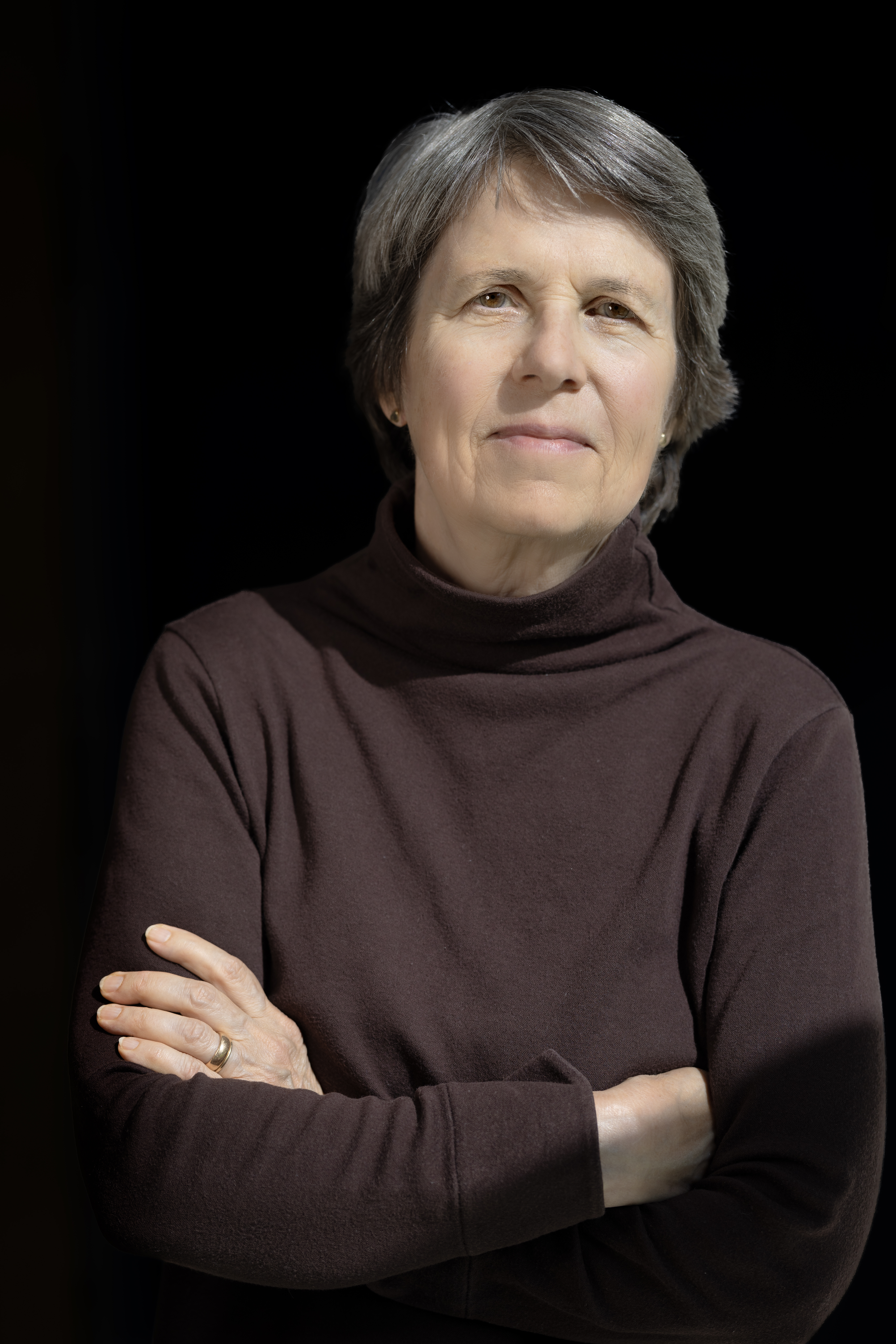
Sallie W. Chisholm, biological oceanographer

The university has been home to scholars, scientists, and writers, including 2025 Nobel Prize winner in Chemistry Omar Yaghi, a University of California, Berkeley chemist; 2017 Nobel Prize winner in Chemistry Joachim Frank, Herman Aguinis, a George Washington University School of Business professor and president of the Academy of Management; Alanna Schepartz, a Yale University chemist and a National Academy of Arts and Sciences inductee; Nobel Prize laureate Toni Morrison; Pulitzer Prize winner William Kennedy; gay rights pioneer Harvey Milk; Broadway actress and three-time Tony Award nominee Carolee Carmello; Turing Award winner Richard E. Stearns; Harvard sociologist Robert J. Sampson and Scott Waldman (biochemist, MD) Samuel M.V. Hamilton Professor of Medicine at Sidney Kimmel Medical College of Thomas Jefferson University.
