= University at Albany Student Association =

Student organization at the University at Albany

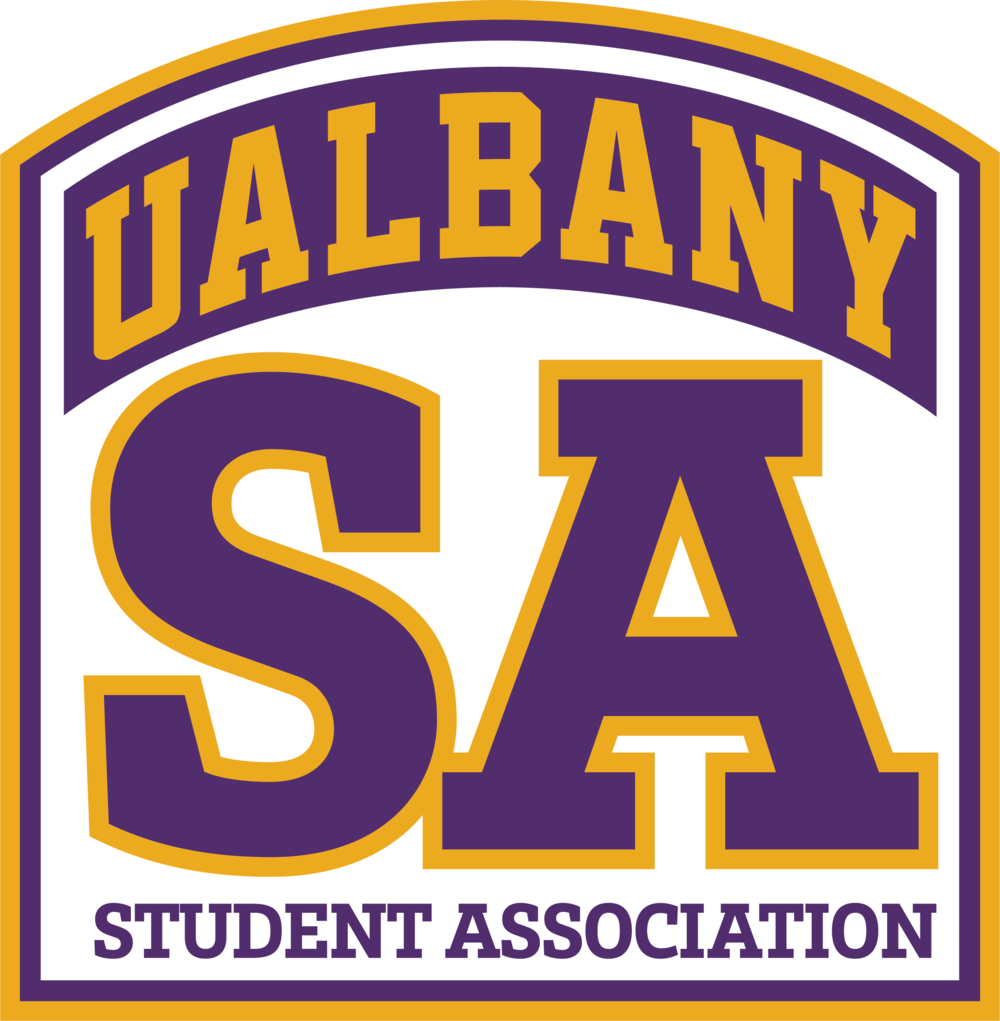
- The Badge Logo of the University at Albany Student Association.
- Abbreviation: UAlbany SA
- Predecessor: Myskania
- Formation: 1923
- Legal status: 501(c)(3)
- Location: 1400 Washington Avenue, Albany, New York, 12222
- Members: 12,000+
- President: Ava-Rae Calloway
- Vice President: Anastacia Pulman
- Chair of the Senate: Jaden Burke
- Vice Chair of the Senate: Sean Metcalf
- Affiliations: University at Albany
- Budget: $3 million
- Website: saualbany.com

The University at Albany Student Association is a non-profit, 501(c)(3) organization and the undergraduate student government of the University at Albany. Established in 1923, it is the largest student-run organization at the university.

The focus of the Association is to provide the undergraduate student population with a positive campus experience. The Association funds over 180 student groups and events on campus, including social, cultural, academic, and professional organizations.

== History ==
=== Early years ===
Myskania was formed in 1917 as a student council comprising seniors responsible for representing student opinions and improving the student body's department. In 1921, Myskania played a crucial role in suggesting the formation of the Student Association, the official student government.

In 1921, Myskania was responsible for drafting the initial constitution for the Student Association, effectively relinquishing its leadership role in student governance. In October 1921, Eunice Rice was elected as the first Student Association president.

The Student Association was officially formed in 1921 with the purpose of managing all non-academic student matters. The Student Association's executive branch was initially managed by the executive board, consisting of the president, vice president, secretary, and treasurer.

The relationship between Myskania and the Student Association witnessed conflicts as early as 1927–28. According to the Student Association's 1945 constitution, the Association claimed the right to represent students before the Faculty Council and changed the election process of Myskania members. Despite this, Myskania suggested that some members should still be chosen from a list prepared by its outgoing members.

By 1928, a new constitution altered the executive branch's structure. The Student Council replaced the executive board, and it included the president, vice president, secretary, and presidents of the four classes. The Council arranged programs for Student Association meetings and executing all legislation passed by the Student Association.

=== 1930s to 1960s ===
John William Jennings (center), the first Black Student Association President (1948)

During the 1930s and 1940s, the Student Association assemblies addressed contemporary political issues. In 1948, John Jennings was elected the first African-American president of the Student Association. In 1949, the Student Association supported CARE, aimed at assisting children affected by war.

In the 1960s, minority groups such as the Women's Liberation Front, Black Students Alliance, and Lesbians for Freedom, gained formal recognition from the Student Association.

Over the decades, the changing nature of the college and successive Student Association constitutions gradually reduced Myskania's functions and powers. Factors contributing to this included an expanded enrollment, relocation to the uptown campus, and the abandonment of certain traditions, such as Rivalry, which ended in 1963.

=== 1960s to 1990s ===
By 1965, Myskania had lost its judicial powers, and its last election occurred in 1978. The Student Association's refusal to fund Myskania's ceremonial functions led to the organization's dissolution in 1979. In 1982, University President Vincent O’Leary initiated the Purple and Gold program, inspired by Myskania's service aspects, such as "assisting at events and providing guides for high-school tours on campus. The Student Association extended its focus to environmental issues, with the recognition of NYPIRG on campus in 1982. It also supported academic initiatives like the Frosh Reading Program.

From the 1970s through the 1990s, the Student Association gained influence in academic affairs, including assessing the competence of teaching faculty and publishing the results of surveys in ACT and SCATE Booklets. In September of 1971, EOP Student Association (EOPSA) founded by Black and Puerto Rican students in anticipation for the Equal Opportunity Program (EOP), which was developed in 1973.

Michael Corso was elected Student Association president for 1982/83, becoming the first disabled Student Association president as a blind person.

=== 2013 to 2019 ===
In August of 2013, the Student Association Speaker Series featured three of top advisors on Barack Obama's two presidential campaigns, David Axelrod, David Plouffe, and Jon Favreau. It was the seventh event for the series "World Within Reach", which also featured a string of high-profile speakers, including Bill Clinton, Colin Powell, Howard Dean, Karl Rove, and Russell Simmons.

On March 9, 2015, during the Student Association's general election period, the student body voted to make the Student Activity Fee voluntary. Soon after, the Student Association Elections Commission invalidated the results of the activity fee referendum, citing a lack of student awareness along with the inclusion of an "abstention" option, ordering a campus-wide re-vote on the Student Activity Fee. The constitutionality of these actions were challenged by Student Association members, who argued it set the precedent to overturn elections until the wanted result is obtained. Supporters of the re-vote argued that the ballot's option for "abstention" confused the student body. In a unanimous decision, the Student Association Supreme Court ruled the language presented in the original ballot violated SUNY Board of Trustee guidelines, which provides a standardized ballot that does not include "abstention" as an option. Further, the Court ruled the initial activity fee referendum took place during the midterm point of the semester, which was not "convenient for the greatest numbers of voters," further violating SUNY Board of Trustee guidelines. In April 2015, the re-vote was held and the Student Activity Fee was reinstated as mandatory, with students overwhelmingly voting in favor of a mandatory fee to protect club funding and the student-run ambulance service, among other critical services funded by the student government.

For the 2016–2017 academic year, the student body elected Felix Abreu, who transferred to UAlbany in Fall of 2013. Abreu was the first Latino Student Association President in two decades, and was also a first-generation college student. After Donald Trump's victory in the 2016 presidential election, there was an increased number of instances of extreme bigotry in the Albany area. Abreu spoke to Times Union in November 2016, saying Trump's comments against immigrants and Muslims made some populations of students anxious.

In 2017, Jerlisa Fontaine was elected as the University at Albany Student Association president. Fontaine was celebrated as the first black woman to assume the position, and the first female president in seventeen years. Fontaine's plans for the Student Association focused on improving budget transparency and emphasizing academic excellence and mentorship.

In 2018, the University Senate voted to remove all religious holidays from their academic calendar in favor of a new fall break in October. Concerns were raised by the Student Association, and legislation was introduced to call on the university to support Jewish holidays like Yom Kippur. Many Jewish students came to the SA to lobby to have the Jewish holidays remain, such as UAlbany Hillel,: a student group on campus. A divided Student Association voted down the resolution, urging the University at Albany to keep the religious holidays off for the following academic year.

=== 2020 to present ===
In the 2019–2020 academic year, the Board of Finance launched an investigation into the Student Association President Desann Chin-Carty for the misuse of funds. The Student Association Senate heard testimony and reviewed evidence to determine whether the president misused more than $1,000 in student fees to purchase personal items. The Board of Finance Chair Samuel Salazar flagged purchases such as gold-colored office accessories, glow-in-the-dark rocks for a fountain in her office, essential oils, and Glade air fresheners. The Board of Finance investigation drew hundreds to a Senate meeting on February 2, 2020, where the board recommended the Senate impeach Chin-Carty and recommended bylaw changes to prevent future misuse, and the Student Association Senate proceeded to vote for impeachment based on Article I: abuse of power and Article II: Neglect of duty, which drew comparisons to then recently concluded first impeachment of Donald Trump. Chin-Carty defended her purchases and called the interrogation a "witch hunt".

In June 2020, a petition initiated by members of the University at Albany appealed to the university to rename Indian Quad to Indigenous Quad as a part of a broader movement towards cultural sensitivity and inclusivity. It also urged the university to establish a task force responsible for identifying and renaming buildings that presently bear names reflecting racist ideologies or histories.

During the COVID-19 pandemic, the Student Association partnered with university administration in 2021 to promote student COVID-19 vaccination through the "#GetVaxxedUAlbany" initiative. The vaccine initiative was started "in hopes of not only promoting vaccinations but also to address any questions and concerns the student body [had] about the COVID-19 vaccine". During that time, the Speaker Series hosted its final guest speaker, an anti-racist activist and historian of race, Ibram X. Kendi. As of 2024, the University at Albany Student Association has not held a speaker series event.

In March 2021, the Student Association Elections Commission launched a formal investigation into alleged unethical campaign conduct by then-President-elect Bryan Ramsaran. Abdoullah Goudiaby, the runner-up of the presidential election, alleged that Ramsaran and campaign affiliates were engaged in bribery, blackmail, and other various election violations. The allegation of bribery stemmed from a conversation between a student organization and Ramsaran, which criticized the impeached president and the public response to the impeachment proceedings, and promised "crypto mining rigs" to the student organization for their support in the election. Goudiaby's For The People campaign had faced subsequent backlash for uncovered tweets insinuating COVID-19 was being spread by a specific ethnic group. Ultimately, the Elections Commission disqualified Ramsaran from the election after reaching a verdict in May 2021 that found him guilty of several elections violations, including bribery, harassment, and involvement with underground Greek life.

In May 2021, Ramsaran was removed from his role as Chair of the Senate by the Student Association Supreme Court after a controversial attempt at installing himself as President of the Student Association. Ramsaran had won the election vote by a 51% margin, but was disqualified from the election. The president-elect, Abdoullah Goudiaby, called a special session with all heads of branches to formulate a plan to resolve the issue. Goudiaby was sworn in as Student Association President with the newly elected senators, effectively defeating the attempt by Ramsaran. The attempt by Ramsaran exposed the dysfunction occurring in the Student Association during the Spring 2021 semester.

After her victory in the Spring 2022 general election, Sri Ganeshaan resigned over the summer. Her resignation defaulted Enid Walker, a sophomore, as the new Student Association President, becoming the youngest student in UAlbany history to hold this position.

On November 1, 2023, UAlbany President Havidan Rodriguez addressed the Student Association's concerns over the merger of the LACS and AFS departments, iterating the "responsibility as an institution to make decisions that we see will benefit the institution moving forward".

Despite initial hopes for a productive year by Senate Chair Madappatt, the Fall 2024 semester included several challenges. Early in the semester, the marketing director submitted a report to the Senate on August 30, raising concerns about statements made by the community engagement director regarding Hamas that seemed to justify violence as a means of liberation. Following further exchanges, the executive branch temporarily suspended the marketing director for investigation, though this was later lifted. Senate discussions ultimately led to the marketing director's removal, while the community engagement director's reappointment received strong support. Additionally, resignations, debates over committee appointments, gridlock on key bills, and the closure of Dippikill Wilderness Retreat impacted the Student Association's stability throughout the semester.

The Fall 2025 semester saw many changes made to the Student Association after the tumultuous year prior. Topics at the first Senate meetings of the semester acknowledged the removal of the BDS resolution passed the semester prior from the SA office and developments in the Dippikill situation. Students spoke and voiced gratitude towards the Student Association for its successful Block Party, with the fully-staffed Pettit Administration recognizing organizations that were traditionally not engaged with by the Student Association. On October 22nd, 2025, the Student Association Senate passed a bill to clarify and regulate the usage of Generative AI within the Student Association, and ban the usage of it for official purposes. The bill mandates that all legislation must be checked with a verified AI checker, and if found, will have its eligibility revoked and nullified.

== Student Association Operations ==
The UAlbany Student Association comprises four branches; Legislative, Judicial, Executive, and Finance. They also operate several departments that execute the Student Association's plan throughout school years.

The University at Albany Student Association is structured as follows:

- The Executive Branch, responsible for overseeing day-to-day operations.
- The Legislative Branch, consisting of the Student Association Senate.
- The Judicial Branch, serves to solve disputes within student organizations.
- The Finance Branch, consists of the office of Comptroller, who manages supplementary requests, and the Board of Finance, who produces the budget.
- Elections Commission, an independent commission that facilitates Student Association elections.

=== 2026 Operations overhaul effort ===
In one of the last meetings in the Fall semester, the Student Association Senate passed legislation on November 19th, 2025 to revamp the Senate Bylaws. The meeting featured a presentation comparing Senate documents to other SUNY student governments. Jaden Burke, Chair of the Rules and Administration Committee, warned the Senate that "under [their] current bylaws, [the Student Association is] functioning illegally". Senate Chair Troy Serao explained that the Judicial Branch and the Elections Commission, which issue binding decisions in its current form, would become part of the Senate as a formal Board of Directors for the organization, as mandated by New York State law. In order for the change in the bylaws to occur, it must pass Senate twice concurrently across two semesters, then voted on and amended if necessary by voting with the student body.

=== Budget ===
The money for the University at Albany Student Association's budget is based on a September to September fiscal time frame and is financed by the annual Student Activity Fee. The student body votes on the Student Activity Fee mandate every two years, with the choice of making the fee voluntary or mandatory.

The internal budget concerns matters such as staff stipends, Dippikill Retreat maintenance and staff wages, as well as Student Association event funding. The external budget serves the student organizations.

== Dippikill Wilderness Retreat ==
The Dippikill Wilderness Retreat is the largest student-owned natural preserve in the United States. The 1,000-acre private wilderness retreat has belonged to the Student Association of the University at Albany since 1956, and is located in Thurman, New York.

Dippikill, since the 1950s, is described as an integral part of the University at Albany educational experience. The original 700 acres were purchased for $10,000 in 1956. The current 772 acres has a full market value of $2.17 million according to the most recent assessment roll.

In late 2019, the Student Association gave less funding than requested for the fiscal year of 2019–20, but added money for more buses to the camp. Dippikill was allocated roughly $30,000 less than they asked for to go towards development and renovations, which the Student Association said is necessary for critical maintenance.

In October 2019, Dippikill closed to the public. According to assistant director of Operation Heidi LaPrairie, the retreat "had a history of issues with the general public with regards to misuse and abuse of [the] property." She explained that the property's listing on AllTrails and social media publicly drew more and more visitors to the site. The cabins and campsites are only open to reservations from University at Albany undergraduates and affiliates.

=== Financial strain and 2024-25 closure controversy ===
For the fiscal year ending in June 2023, the Student Association told the IRS that it had collected $470,000 in revenue, but paid out $530,000 in expenses. On November 8, 2024, the Times Union reported that the wilderness retreat had abruptly closed. The Student Association did not explain the reasons for the closure, but the organization gave a statement saying it had to close the retreat due to "significant financial strain".

In December 2024, Times Union reported that former Student Association President James Lamb was told by university officials that the Student Association were attempting to sell the property. Dippikill spokesperson Adam Croglia stated in a series of emails that officials are still evaluating the financial situation and there is no intention to sell, which was confirmed by Dippikill management.

In April 2025, President Jalen Rose revealed that the ongoing closure of Dippikill was due to wage and hour claims by its eight employees. A settlement was reached in March after five-month long negotiations. The SA Senate created a committee to evaluate current and future operations at the site after alumni accused leadership of fraudulently inducing fundraising with misinformation. On April 28, 2025, the Student Association Senate convened and voted to keep the Dippikill Wilderness Retreat closed pending evaluation by a consultant and the ad-hoc committee.

After new leadership was sworn in on May 1, 2025, President Trevor Pettit proposed a three-way split model to divide the fiscal responsibility of Dippikill with the University Auxiliary Services and the Alumni Association, with each partner equally paying $125,000 to cover its operations. The proposed plan would involve reducing Dippikill's operating hours, prioritizing summer and fall seasons with booking limited between Thursdays and Sundays, according to consultant data. On September 2, President Pettit and the Dippikill Board signed a letter of intent in favor of a reopened Dippill, ending the Dippikill financial crisis. The Vice President of Finance for the University at Albany, Todd Foreman, responded that this plan removes liability from the Student Association both fiscal and managerial responsibilities, calling it "a reasonable and good investment for the Student Association". President Trevor Pettit said the 18-month reincorporation process would allow for improvements in transportation, programming, and outreach, saying it would "protect Dippikill access and ensure its long-term stability".
