= Imam Hafiz Masood =

American imam (born 1958)

Imam Hafiz Muhammed Masood (Urdu: إ مام حافظ مسعود) (b. March 1, 1958) was imam of the Sharon Mosque in Sharon, Massachusetts, USA, from 1998 to 2006. By 1980, he earned the honorary title Hafiz by memorizing the entire text of the Qur'an.

== Biography ==
=== Early life and education ===
Masood was born March 1, 1958, in Sargodha, Pakistan. He received his degree in theology from Faisalabad before teaching as an assistant professor at the International Islamic University in Islamabad from 1981 to 1987. In late 1987, he immigrated to the United States with his wife and children to obtain an economics degree from Boston University. The time limit to earn his degree under a USAID scholarship expired in 1995, and he was terminated from the University but continued to live in student housing until 1998. In 2005, after requesting he be granted a master's degree in economic policy from Boston University and supplying a curriculum vitae, the university conferred a degree upon Masood.

=== Career ===
In 1998, Masood became imam of the Sharon Mosque, a mosque under the leadership of the Islamic Center of New England (ICNE). During his tenure, he promoted religious tolerance and worked intimately with Jewish groups. In November 2006, he was detained by federal immigration agents for visa violations. In August 2007, he was arrested by the United States U.S. Immigration and Customs Enforcement and charged with failing to properly leave and re-enter the country on a student visa. He posted a $7500 bond and was released to return to his community. In February 2008, Masood pleaded not guilty to five counts of visa fraud but volunteered for deportation. He returned to Lahore and started a small business. He left his wife and eight children who currently live in the United States.^{[5]}

The non-profit organization Americans for Peace and Tolerance believes many of Masood's supporters remain in leadership roles in the Boston Muslim community. Eid also claimed that these radical doctrines at ICNE (and another mosque ran by Islamic Society of Boston) had a motivating influence on several well known local jihadists, including several below:

He resurfaced in Pakistan, where he is now spokesman for the Pakistani terrorist organization Jamaat-ud-Dawah, a group founded by his brother, Hafiz Muhammad Saeed. Saeed also founded Lashkar-e-Taiba, the Pakistani terrorist group behind the 2008 Mumbai attacks. The United States calls it a terrorist front group tied to the 2008 attacks in Mumbai and has offered $10 million for evidence leading to Saeed's arrest or conviction. Masood has denied the accusations.

In 2012, he heads his brother's media wing and runs a separate mosque and religious school in Pakistan. He isn't paid, he said, although the congregation provides him a home. He supports himself through a small embroidery business and drives a 10-year-old Toyota Corolla. He took a second wife, as is permissible under Islam, and has since had another son, who is 2. "I started my family from scratch again," he said. He prays at the same mosque where his older brother preaches fiery sermons proclaiming the violent destruction of the U.S and that Islam will dominate the world.

Preceded by Imam Talal Eid; 1993–1998	Sharon Mosque Imams; Imam Hafiz Masood; 1998–2006	Succeeded by Khalid Nasr; 2006–2016
