= Sharon Mosque =

Mosque in Massachusetts

Location
- Location: Sharon, Massachusetts, United States
- Interactive map of Sharon Mosque
- Coordinates: 42°5′45″N 71°11′43″W

Architecture
- Type: Mosque
- Established: 1993

The Sharon Mosque is a mosque located in Sharon, Massachusetts, United States.

== History ==
The mosque was founded in 1993 as an extension of the Islamic Center of New England (ICNE) which was established by Lebanese American immigrants in Quincy, Massachusetts. The mosque is situated on 55 acres formerly used for a horse farm. The main building is a social hall large enough to accommodate 500 people.

=== School ===
The second building behind the mosque houses an Islamic elementary school, Al Noor School, and weekend school. Former president of the school, Abdul Badi Abousamra was a prominent Boston doctor, Muslim activist, and father of Ahmad Abousamra, who is on the FBI Most Wanted Terrorists list.

== Imams ==
Talal Eid was the first Imam of the Sharon mosque as well as the sister mosque in Quincy. Eid left ICNE in 2005 after creeping radicalism put him increasingly at odds in the late 1990s with the board of directors.

In 1998, Muhammad Masood became Imam of the Sharon Mosque. In November 2006, he was detained by federal immigration agents for visa violations. In August 2007, he was arrested on criminal visa fraud charges. He pled guilty to five counts of visa fraud and volunteered for deportation in February 2008. After leaving the country, he became spokesman for the Pakistani terrorist organization Jamaat-ud-Dawah.

Interim Imam and Egyptian native, Khalid Nasr, was Imam of both Sharon and Quincy Mosques. After a difficult search, Abdur Rahman Ahmad, became the new Imam in 2015.

- 1993-1998: Talal Eid
- 1998-2006: Muhammad Masood
- 2006-2015: Khalid Nasr
- 2015-current: Abdur Rahman Ahmad

== See also ==
- List of mosques in the Americas
- Lists of mosques
- List of mosques in the United States
