= Saggy Tahir =

American politician

Saghir "Saggy" Tahir

Member of the New Hampshire House of Representatives from the 9th Hillsborough district
- In office 2001–2011

Personal details
- Born: 1944/1945 Delhi, India
- Died: October 16, 2013 (age 68) Manchester, New Hampshire, U.S.
- Party: Republican
- Spouse: Nusrat Tahir
- Children: Three
- Occupation: Independent consultant on roofing, waterproofing and energy

Saghir "Saggy" Tahir (died October 16, 2013) was an American politician who was a member of the New Hampshire House of Representatives. In the 2006 elections, he was re-elected for a fourth term to represent Ward 2, District 9 in his home town of Manchester.

== Background ==
Tahir was born in British Raj India, at New Delhi. In 1972 he emigrated to the United States from Lahore, Pakistan, "with about $100 to his name." After coming to America Tahir "worked a variety of jobs, mostly in the construction field and invested in rental properties." At this point of his life Tahir felt sacrifice was necessary: "I was married to the business rather than married to my wife." Focusing on his businesses left him with little family time. "I wanted to take my kids out of the poverty cycle because I came from a poor family and to do that I had to work and I did work more than 16, 18, 20 hours a day, seven days a week to get ahead of the bunch."

Tahir has a B.S. in Physics and Mathematics and a B.S. in Civil Engineering. Tahir is believed to be the first Pakistani native to be elected to a state legislature anywhere in the United States. Tahir is the first Muslim-American elected to a political position in the United States of America.

== Government service ==
In 1998 Tahir was challenged by his son "to give back to the community by running for State legislator". Tahir was skeptical. "Honestly speaking, I was a typical Pakistani with a lot of bias. I was convinced 100 percent that no one would vote for me other than my wife." Tahir did not win in 1998, but felt "he lost because he didn't work hard enough." In 2000 he ran again with a more active campaign and "won with over 70 percent of the vote." Tahir focused on the issues in a "constituency in which there are 90 percent white Americans" without a sizeable Pakistani-American community. One of the focuses of his campaign was his commitment "to providing the highest education to our children so that they can compete here at home and abroad."

Tahir took his seat in the New Hampshire General Court, State House of Representatives for Ward 2. The New Hampshire House of Representatives has 400 members and is the fourth-largest English-speaking legislative in the world. As representatives are paid $100 a year plus reimbursement for mileage, it is generally seen as voluntary work.

Upon taking office Tahir has been credited with a good "work ethic and ethical standards". Tahir was deeply moved the first time he spoke on the floor of the house, "They are talking about ethics. We are the judges of our actions. When was the last time the taxpayers approved for us to take a free lunch?" Tahir's political focus has been on education and aiding the needy. In the past he has taken "a high-level delegation to a local homeless shelter to push for more support and funding." Tahir was re-elected in District 50 (Wards 2, 3, 10 & 11) in November, 2002. He serves as a member of the Public Works and Highways Committee, and was Chairman of the City Republican Committee in 2001. He served as the 2nd Vice Chair, City Republican Committee in 2000 and Secretary, City Republican Committee in 1999.

Soon after his 2000 victory Tahir "hit the road to make appearances and speak to Pakistani American communities...[to] give a wake-up call to all Muslim Americans to show that the United States is your home, and you must give back to local communities so that Americans of other faiths will look at you as brothers and sisters, instead of adversaries. ...[and remind them to say] thanks to the veterans because their efforts and sacrifices gave us this land of opportunity."

== Advocacy groups ==
(see also support of ARK below.)

Tahir is active in many advocacy groups concerning both Pakistani-Americans and American-Muslims. He believes it to be both a religious obligation and a civic duty. "That's exactly what I am trying to remind my fellow American Muslims. God does not say you give back to the Muslims only. He says give back to my people. All people in the universe are his people, regardless of what religion they follow."

=== American Muslim Alliance ===
Tahir is the President of the American Muslim Alliance (AMA) New Hampshire chapter. He was a lead speaker at AMA's March 31, 2001 East Regional Leadership Training Conference in Westborough, Massachusetts. After the Sept. 11th attacks, Tahir attended the Oct. 2001, 6th annual AMA national convention in San Jose, California, where he was a key speaker. The usually unnoticed convention of "about 500 Muslims at the Wyndham Garden Hotel" received a different treatment this time. "Police officers patrolled the hotel's lobby and front entrance, reporters from national and regional media roamed the convention eager to learn how Muslim-Americans have been reacting to both the Sept. 11 terrorist attacks and the ensuing race-motivated backlash against them." While attending the convention Tahir also attended a peace rally held in César Chávez Park. At the rally he was interviewed by Brad Williams of WB20, Channel 11. He told the reporter that "We are Americans first." Asked on the American strikes into Afghanistan, Tahir replied, "Pakistan don't want a neighbor to the north that is an enemy. Foreign policy starts with your neighbor." On October 5, 2002, at the AMA's 7th national convention, Tahir was on a panel called "Muslims in Politics: Success Stories". Also on the panel were Yaphett El-Amin (then Assemblywomen-Elect) and Dr. M. Ali Chaudry, a Township Committee Member.

=== Other advocacy work ===
On October 18, 2003, Tahir served on a panel at the inaugural event of the Pakistani-American Leadership Initiative (PALI). The mission of PALI is "to serve as a forum for young Pakistani-American professionals to develop and enhance leadership skills". The panel on which Tahir participated was called "The Leaders of Today Meet the Leaders of Tomorrow" and was held at the Embassy of Pakistan in Washington, D.C. After the panel met and lunch was held, the participants were addressed by the Pakistani Ambassador, Ashraf Jehangir Qazi, who told them that professionals in the Pakistani-American community need to take action and not just espouse ideas, as "the situation created since 9/11 has underlined the need for the potential of our community to 'take off'."

On April 17, 2004, Tahir was the chief guest speaker for the Pakistan American Association of Southern New England (PAASNE).

On June 23, 2005, Tahir was on a panel hosted by the Islamic Center of New England to discuss the work of Imam Dr. Talal Eid, Th. D., and his paper on "Marriage, Divorce and Child Custody As Experienced By American Muslims: Religious, Social and Legal Considerations", with a special focus on reflecting "on the issues concerning Muslim women in America."

==== Prayer Hall Food Pantry ====
Tahir maintains that helping the needy is not charity but a duty demanded by Islam. "From birth to death there are thousands of human needs. Most are fulfilled by education and employment. Everyone should do whatever he/she can. It is not a charity. It our duty and the right of those who do not have. It is Islam." In accord with these beliefs he has made it an annual tradition to donate turkeys to the Prayer Hall Hooksett food bank (where he serves on the board of directors) to provide meals for 400 residents in Manchester, Hooksett and Auburn.

=== Honors ===
On May 19, 2001, at Gaithersburg, Maryland, the Pakistan Association of Greater Washington (a group that "focuses on issues facing the Pakistani-American Community, specially relating to our first immigrant generation") honored Tahir with a Community Achievement Award for his accomplishments. The Lt. Governor of Maryland, Kathleen Kennedy Townsend, sent a message in recognition of Tahir's accomplishments. "You stand as a role model and symbol of encouragement to everyone to never stop short of reaching our goals. Your leadership and vision are a tremendous asset to the continued growth and achievement of the Pakistan community." Masood Khan, the Political Counselor of the Pakistan Embassy, attended to represent his ambassador.

In March 2004, Tahir was honored by the Pakistani American Congress (PAC), "an umbrella organization of 57 nationwide Pakistani groups", as one of the Pakistani Americans who "fought many odds to lead America towards a 'more perfect democracy'." He gave a speech documenting his "struggles and road to success" after receiving the award.

=== Criticism ===
After the September 11, 2001 attacks, the Pakistan American Association of North America (PAANA) condemned the Overseas Pakistanis Foundation (OPF) led by Tahir. In December 2001, they maintained that the OPF's statement that "Pakistanis are not discriminated in US, nor being harassed by the law-enforcement agencies, or threatened by the locals", was false. They "pointed out that after Sept. 11, one Pakistani citizen was murdered last month in Dallas, Texas, a former Pakistani journalist was beaten in New York City, one Pakistani student was beaten in the INS Deportation Cell in the presence of INS officials, several other beating cases were reported from other parts of the United States. More than 165 Pakistanis were arrested by the FBI on suspicion of connection with WTC attack, most of them were shifted to INS in violation of the law." They stressed that Tahir "does not represent the Pakistani community in the United States".

== Delegation to Pakistan ==
As a Muslim Pakistani-American elected official, Tahir has been working to strengthen understanding between Americans of all backgrounds, and "Since September 11th Pakistanis in the USA have been working very hard to educate non-Muslims about Islam, Jihad, Pakistan and also Afghanistan." After the attacks of September 11, 2001 Tahir "felt compelled to try to ease the tension between the two countries" of Pakistan and the USA. Tahir was impressed when after the attacks of 9-11 New Hampshire leaders reached out to him and others among the small population of local Muslims. "The mayor, the police chief, the attorney general, a Jewish rabbi offered protection or sponsored events to promote public understanding". Tahir has long maintained that the example of co-existence in the US could help end factionalism in Pakistan, "If all the religions and communities of the world can live and prosper in USA, why can't we do it in Pakistan? It is real Islam."

On November 16, 2001, after discussing the idea with the US State Department (who were not only supportive but offered financial assistance) Tahir lead a delegation to Pakistan "to promote better understanding between Pakistan and the United States of America." The central points of the trip were to promote the idea that "Pakistan's future development relies heavily on foreign investment, especially from the United States and the European Union", "to establish better awareness between the people of Pakistan and the USA", and "to inform Pakistanis that are many Americans who support fair policies towards Muslim nations." Tahir's press release stated that he "feels that American citizens should know that the people in Pakistan care for them equally" and that he believed that "there are tremendous mis-impressions regarding how Pakistanis view Americans and vice versa." Which "has resulted in lack of trust and confidence between the two peoples." The delegation visited Islamabad, Lahore, Karachi and Quetta. Press conferences were held with the local media with the facilitation of the US Embassy of Pakistan in Washington DC. The Pakistani Government also offered financial assistance, but both their and the State Dept.'s offers were politely declined and the mission was self-funded by the delegation. Tahir's personal goals for the delegation was to combat the sentiments in Pakistan that led some Pakistanis to burn American flags before the media. He held this "can only infuriate Americans all over the world. This type of behavior does not promote the investments that can create jobs and lead to progress." He hoped the delegation could "turn sentiments around as both Pakistan and the United States are now at the threshold of establishing a more durable and lasting relationship." In a press release by the United States Embassy, Tahir was quoted as saying "Who is teaching Pakistanis about how good America is? There's been a relationship between the U.S. government and the government of Pakistan, but there has never been much people-to-people contact. We're going to tell Pakistanis how good a life, we as Muslims, live here in the U.S. Freedom of speech, freedom of religion, human rights, justice for all - this is exactly what Islam is." He expressed that "he would like to see Pakistan develop the same level of tolerance and respect that he experiences in the United States, and he sees education as the key to that achievement. As a boy, he said, he spent an hour every morning in the madrassa, learning the Koran, and then went to school, where he studied mathematics and science for the rest of the day. 'We need education'."

Other members of the delegation were Agha M. Afzal Khan, Khalil-Ur-Reman (Chief Editor of Urdu Times, Awam and Pakistan Abroad), Vakil Ansari Writer/columnist and Co-Chief Editor of "Pakistan Abroad", Asad Abidi (Gov't Hospital, New Jersey), Naseem Akhtar and Masrur Javed Khan (Physicians).

Tahir gave his personal motivation for instigating the delegation, saying "If you believe that you can make a difference in the lives of fellow human beings around you, in your community, in your state, in your country, you must offer your services. When you die, everything you do for yourself will die with you but everything you do for others will last for a long time."

The delegation's trip was mentioned again in July 2002, when several Pakistani-American advocacy groups joined under the umbrella organization Pakistani-American National Alliance (PANA). The group formed "with the objective of averting a nuclear holocaust and promoting Pakistan's proposals for peace and arms reduction in South Asia." Tahir, congratulated the new organization, saying that unity "is my mission and wherever I go, I call for unity and cooperation." Tahir held that because of a "lack of a unified platform the Pakistani American community has no voice. ...the Pakistani American community should use its clout to affect developments in Pakistan."

Tahir held that Pakistani Americans should stop hoping for the return of Pakistan's ex-Prime Ministers Benazir Bhutto (now deceased) and Nawaz Sharif (who was exiled to Saudi Arabia after Pervez Musharraf's coup). In 2002 Pakistan's Pres. Musharraf had the constitution amended banning prime ministers from serving more than two terms (which was widely seen as a measure against Bhutto and Sharif), Tahir said that "we should forget Nawaz Sharif and Benazir and vote for new people." Tahir noted his previous delegation to Pakistan and said he had been approached to return "I am asked to take a delegation of 100 Pakistani Americans to Pakistan to urge the people to vote new generation because the old generation has failed us."

== Kashmir delegation ==
Tahir "visits Kashmir almost every year". When N.H. State House Deputy Majority Leader Robert Giuda (R-Warren) learned of this he asked if Tahir would bring back some "beautiful shawls and sweaters" for him. Tahir later recalled that "I asked him if that was all he knew about Kashmir, and he said, 'Yeah, what else?' I said, 'Do you know there are hundreds of millions of people in India and Pakistan and Kashmir suffering from the senselessness of both governments purchasing weapons for this and that?' and then he got interested to know more." They applied for visas and were "the first U.S. civilians in 12 years to be allowed by the Pakistani military to visit the Line of Control between India and Pakistan." Seeking to visit both sides of the Line of Control they "applied for visas to visit the Indian side of the Line of Control." Tahir maintained that this was important "to be fair and objective and honest, we have to go to the Indian side and hear what they are saying, because in the long run, we have to do what is good for the American people."

In December 2002, traveling at their own expense, Tahir and Giuda went to Azad Kashmir. There they visited refugee camps by "the Line of Control near Chikote, several small towns in the area, a military post, the Ambore Refugee Camp in Muzzafarabad, and several orphanages." They were also able to speak "for 45 minutes with the chief of staff of Pakistan President Pervez Musharraf, and to other Pakistan government officials and opposition leaders. A meeting with Musharraf was cancelled when he was called to sign a water treaty." After returning to the US Giuda said "That trip changed our lives." Giuda (a former officer and pilot for the U.S. Marine Corps and an ex-FBI agent) told the New Hampshire Union Leader that while he usually doesn't cry in public, he wept "when he talked to an elderly Muslim in a Kashmir refugee camp. The man described "the day that Indian army soldiers visited his family. The man and his wife were forced to watch while the men raped and then murdered his adult daughters."

Giuda was so moved by the experience that he authored a concurrent resolution in the New Hampshire State House (HCR 16) urging "the United States to facilitate a just, peaceful, and rapid resolution to the Kashmiri conflict between India and Pakistan; to bring a cessation of atrocities against the people of Jammu and Kashmir; and, as a result, to reduce the threat of nuclear war in Southwest Asia." The bill passed the NH State House with great support by voice vote, and passed unanimously in the State Senate by unanimous voice vote on February 20, 2003. The resolution was delivered to President George W. Bush, Vice President Dick Cheney, Speaker of the House Dennis Hastert, and the New Hampshire Congressmen and Senators in Washington, D.C. Tahir was credited as "The catalyst behind the resolution" who "had persuaded the Republican deputy majority leader of the house" to join his delegation. Tahir stated "It is in the best interest of the United States and its people to bring the Kashmir resolution to bear, because too many people in that continent are being deprived of food, clothing, health care and housing. Peace has to prevail. After 55 years of conflict, enough is enough."

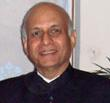
Lalit Mansingh, India's ambassador to the USA

The Indian Ambassador to the United States, Lalit Mansingh, wrote the leaders of the NH Legislature "taking exception" to the concurrent resolution. In return Giuda accused India of committing "atrocities" amounting to "the worst kind of genocide". He demanded that in the future the Tahir delegation be allowed to visit the part of Kashmir controlled by India, "I would very much like Prime Minister Atal Bihari Vajpayee and the Indian government to prove me wrong by letting us visit Indian-held Kashmir."

On April 22, 2003, the Asian News International reported that the resolution "reached the Foreign Affairs Committee of the US Senate for consideration." This led to a denial of a visa request by Giuda to visit the Indian side of the Line of Control. India's ambassador to the US Lalit Mansingh Lal protested the resolution, saying "the legislators did not have all the facts when they adopted the resolution". Pakistan's ambassador to the US Ashraf Jehangir Qazi, issued a response saying "There is only one country in the world that takes the position that Kashmir is an integral part of India, and that is India itself."

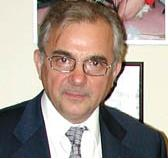
Ashraf Jehangir Qazi, Pakistan's ambassador to the USA.

The Tahir delegation returned to Kashmir again in February 2003 with a larger NH delegation and a television reporter. They returned to the Line-of-Control "meeting with everyone from victims of artillery barrages, gang rape, and forced amputation to refugees, orphans, shop-keepers, families, school children, military authorities, and national leaders." One of the national leaders they met with was Pakistan's President Pervez Musharraf. The delegation "presented copies of HCR16 as symbols of our commitment to bringing a just and lasting peace to all Kashmiris on both sides of the Line of Control that now divides them. The upwelling of hope and gratitude generated by our actions was beyond anything we have ever seen."

When India pulled out of US moderated talks on Kashmir that year, Giuda expanded on what the Tahir delegation had seen and condemned India, "It is ironic that India, which boasts itself as 'the world's largest democracy', avoids direct questions about its refusal to permit observers from human rights organizations, other nations and states, or the United Nations, to visit Indian Occupied Kashmir, where reports of atrocities committed by Indian troops and paramilitary police continue to escalate. ...The people of Kashmir continue to fight against overwhelming and oppressive intrusion into all aspects of their lives, held hostage by an Indian government that denies any culpability for gang rapes of thousands of Kashmiri Muslim women by Indian soldiers, custodial killings of thousands of young Kashmiri men by army and paramilitary troops, deliberate shelling of non-combatant men, women, and children, schools, hospitals, shops, and homes, and the systematic destruction of the economic underpinnings of Kashmir. ...The days of India keeping a shroud of secrecy over its brutal repression of rights in Kashmir and the persecution of Kashmiri Muslims are numbered."

Giuda went on to form Americans for Resolution of Kashmir (ARK) a non-profit organization which was "organized exclusively to conduct, organize, educate, and publicize all issues attendant to the Kashmiri conflict, its impact on the Kashmiri people, and its importance to global peace and the security of the United States of America." Tahir has given his time and support to ARK. Supporters of India mentioned Tahir in their rebuttals of Giuda's allegations.

== Earthquake relief ==
Since the 2005 Pakistan earthquake "Tahir has been raising money for the Pakistan earthquake victims. He also will lead a delegation to rebuild a destroyed school." Within Tahir's hometown of Manchester, New Hampshire, there were two families who had relatives in Pakistan who died in the disaster "that killed thousands and displaced millions in central Asia." Tahir grieved with a man who had "lost his brother and sister, as well as all his siblings' children". He said "These are stories you just can't believe can happen."

== Karatzas mosque controversy ==
Residents near the construction site of a new mosque in Manchester built by The Islamic Society of Greater Manchester fought the building of a 13,085-square-foot (1,215.6 m^{2}) mosque in court (the judge ruled for the mosque). Then residents near the construction site called "for the strict enforcement of on-street parking bans" against the volunteer construction workers vehicles. They sent their aldermen a petition demanding "parking remain prohibited on both sides of the road." Tahir stated his opinion that "This is harassment." He likened it to discrimination movements of the past "It happened with the Jews. It happened with the Irish." The residents of Karatzas Avenue said "We're not making this a mosque issue. We're making this a no parking issue." The construction manager claimed that they only parked "two or three cars on the street when they can't be accommodated elsewhere" and that "only a handful of cars drive on Karatzas Avenue each day, making parking a minor issue."

== Republican Party ==
Tahir joins U.S. Rep. Keith Ellison (D-MN), U.S. Rep André Carson (D-IN), State Rep. Ako Abdul-Samad (D-IA), State Del. Saqib Ali (D-MD); and State Senator Larry Shaw (D-NC) as the only elected Muslim officials in the United States of America as of 2006.

A former Manchester party chairman said that among the reasons Tahir's campaign was greeted by Republicans was for "the potential he has to draw minorities to the party." Soon after taking office Tahir was made head of the Manchester Republican City Committee. Tahir pledged that the Manchester Republicans would not focus on partisanship and instead concentrate on "issues such as taxes, the senior center and schools". He told a reporter, "These are the things the people are interested in; it's not a fight between two neighbors." In 2002 Tahir stepped down and Ed Mosca became the head of the Manchester Republican Committee.

Tahir has been worried about the perception American-Muslims in general have had for his party for some time. Before the 2004 elections, Tahir told the BBC that he was worried that Republicans could be losing the Muslim-American vote. He explained "I am concerned about the backlash by the American Muslim community. But I believe the Republican Party will try to mend fences and make sure they don't desert the party." This worry appears to have been justified as "According to (the Council on American-Islamic Relations) CAIR 78% of Muslims voted Republican in 2000...because many American Muslims say they share the same social values as the Republicans." But as of 2006 "A pre-election CAIR survey revealed that 42 percent Muslim voters consider themselves members of the Democratic Party while only 17 per cent are Republican." Polls indicate this is because they "strongly oppose the war in Iraq" and have a "deep disaffection with the Bush administration".

== Quotes ==
- "I could not thank those heroes enough for what they have done for this nation. I wish I had met them in person so I could have said how grateful I am for their sacrifices to give me this land of opportunity." - His comments after a visit to Arlington National Cemetery
- "We all know that U.S. senators, congressmen and the president enjoy the best healthcare in the world. Do we ever think for a moment who made it possible? We owe older Americans a lot, and it's our seniors who worked hard to give us the most powerful country in the world."

== Personal ==
He is married to Nusrat Tahir and they have three children Misbah, Adeel, and their daughter Sanam (who was born in 1989). They reside in Manchester, New Hampshire. Tahir is employed as "an independent consultant on roofing, waterproofing and energy and says his clients are mostly Fortune 500 companies."

Tahir was interviewed upon the murder of his friend shopkeeper Syed Ali Hussain.

Tahir died at Catholic Medical Center in Manchester, NH on Oct. 16, 2013 due to natural causes.

== Electoral results ==
- 2006 Race for Hillsborough District #9

Three to be elected.

Name	Votes	Percent
Saggy Tahir (R) (incumbent) (won)	1,342	19%
Catherine Hackett (D) (won)	1,323	18%
Sandra Smith (D) (won)	1,258	17%
Pete Escalera (D)	1,175	16%
Cate Johnson (R)	1,093	15%
Win Hutchinson (R)	1,041	14%

- 2006 GOP Primary Results: (Dist. 9/Ward 2)

Name	Votes
Tahir	205
Johnson	127
Hutchinson	120
Maloney	093
Barden	073
Whitfield	068

- 2004 Results: (Dist. 9/Ward 2)

Name	Votes
Tahir (R)	2,215
Craig	2,057
Golding (R)	1,810
Robitaille	1,645
Hutchinson (R)	1,574
Bouchard	1,561

- 2002 Results: (Dist. 50/Wards 2, 3, 10, 11)

Name	Votes
Messier (R)	4,170
Cail (R)	3,822
Tahir (R)	3,821
Craig (D)	3,746
Hagan (R)	3,728
Clayton (D)	3,727
Laflamme (R)	3,578
Guinta (R)	3,472
Sullivan (D)	3,424
Brassard (D)	3,390
Greenberg (R)	3,371
Golding (R)	3,302
Katsiantonis (D)	3,301
Herman (R)	3,292
Panagopoulos (D)	3,243
Bouchard (D)	3,227
Heath (R)	3,194
Buckley (D)	3,076
Greenway (R)	3,070
Swasey (D)	3,007
L'Heureux (D)	2,934
Early (D)	2,740
Greazzo (L)	758

- 2000 Results: (Dist. 38/Ward 2)

Name	Votes
Tahir (R)	1,737
Craig	1,721
Golding (R)	1,439
Ahern	1,437
Bouchard	1,384
Varkas (R)	1,368

- 1998 GOP Primary Results
  - Tahir
