= David Bernstein =

David Bernstein may refer to:

- David P. Bernstein (born 1956), professor of forensic psychotherapy
- David Bernstein (law professor) (born 1967), American law professor
- David I. Bernstein, dean of Pardes Institute of Jewish Studies, Jerusalem and New York City
- David Bernstein (architect) (1937–2018)
- David Bernstein (businessman) (born 1943), chairman of the British Red Cross, formerly chairman of French Connection, of Manchester City F.C., and of the English Football Association
- David Bernstein (activist), American political activist
- David Bernstein (chess player), see Israeli Chess Championship
