= Charles Jacobs (activist) =

American human rights and Zionist activist

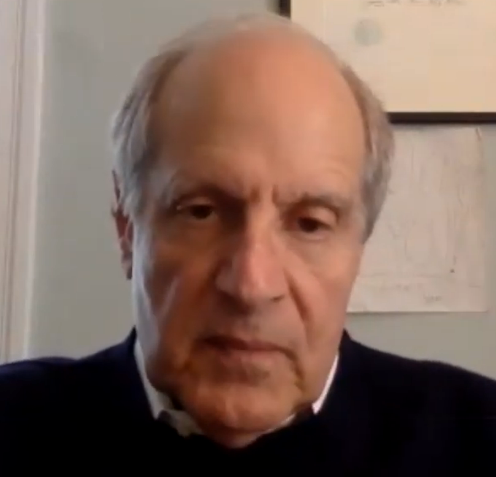
- Jacobs in 2020
- Education: Harvard University
- Occupation: Activist
- Website: www.peaceandtolerance.org

Charles Jacobs is an American human rights and Zionist activist best known for his work to combatting slavery in the Muslim world. In 1988, he co-founded Boston's branch of CAMERA, and in 2002, he founded The David Project. He is currently the president of Americans for Peace and Tolerance (APT), which describes itself as a Boston-based non-profit that combats Islamist antisemitism.

== Early life and career ==
Jacobs spent his early years in Newark, New Jersey. He has been described as a business consultant and a management consultant. He holds a Doctor of Education (EdD) from Harvard University, having graduated in 1988. The Jewish Advocate (Boston) has described Jacobs as a key figure in founding Boston's chapter of the Committee for Accuracy in Middle East Reporting in America (CAMERA);

== American Anti-Slavery Group ==
Jacobs has been involved in anti-slavery activism since the 1990s, having helped to found the American Anti-Slavery Group (AASG)—which was incorporated in December 1994, with Jacobs as its clerk and treasurer—through which he proceeded to publicize contemporary slavery in Sudan and Mauritania. Jacobs campaigned personally in favor of divestment from mutual funds supporting oil companies such as Talisman Energy which, he alleged, supported the Khartoum-based Sudanese government.

AASG, in partnership with Christian Solidarity International (CSI), participated in a practice known as slave redemption, whereby aid organizations purchase slaves' freedom with money from donations. As of 1999, AASG was a fundraiser for CSI. AASG's and CSI's slave redemption policy was opposed by UNICEF, which argued that the practice was "intolerable." Jacobs responded on behalf of AASG that "[w]hat is intolerable is to leave these women and children in the hands of brutal captors" and also disputed UNICEF's allegations that redemption encourages the purchase of weaponry by injecting US dollars into the Sudanese economy. He has further claimed that slave redemption does not incentivize the slave trade, although he characterized the policy as a "temporary solution" that AASG would abandon if it were deemed counterproductive by the people of Sudan.

Jacobs was given the Boston Freedom Award in September 2000 as an acknowledgment of his anti-slavery work. His application was chosen from a pool of approximately 12 other candidates. Jacobs has thus far been the sole recipient of the award, which was created by Boston 2000, a private corporation tasked with preparing celebrations and other commemorations for the New Year in Boston, as part of Boston's festivities for the new millennium. The award was presented on behalf of Boston 2000 by Mayor Thomas Menino and Coretta Scott King, but it was neither officially endorsed nor funded by the city of Boston; partial financing was provided by Andrew Wilson, creator of the Boston Duck Tours.

== David Project ==
Along with Ralph Avi Goldwasser, Jacobs founded the David Project for Jewish Leadership in 2002. The Project is a right-wing organization whose mission is to "combat anti-Israel bias on university campuses" and "document campus harassment of Jewish students." According to The Forward, Jacobs viewed the David Project as a means of combating a purported "'Muslim-left' anti-Israel alliance on campus." Daniel Pipes has described the David Project as one element of a "general effort" to combat the bias he perceives in universities which includes his own Middle East Forum and David Horowitz's eponymous Freedom Center. Jacobs has also described the Project as a "response to the new anti-Semitism in which Jews are hated not for their religion or race, but for their state" and an attempt to "teach Jews who were divided politically to make Israel's case in the face of the unfair, dishonest discourse on college campuses." While the David Project under Jacobs's leadership focused much of its attention on universities, it also launched initiatives in Jewish day schools, middle schools, high schools, and summer programs.

In perhaps its most famous campaign, the David Project released a documentary titled Columbia Unbecoming that highlighted professors at Columbia University who the organization perceived to be hostile to Jewish students and pro-Israel viewpoints. Jacobs described this film as aiming "to stop the ideological assault on Israel" in universities, and to teach college students how to "make Israel's case." The University investigated the claims made in Columbia Unbecoming and did not find that any antisemitic statements had been made. Sociologist Jonathan R. Cole has described the film as "one-sided" and has further suggested that the documentary and similar "critics of the university ... tend to blur the distinction between speech and action" by "accus[ing] professors of inappropriate action and intimidation when they are actually trying to attack the content of their ideas."

Under Jacobs's leadership, the David Project in 2004 campaigned to create a competitor to Mosaic: World News from the Middle East, a public affairs program, on Newton public television. Mosaic featured reports from an array of news organizations based in the Middle East.

The David Project was instrumental in publicizing allegations that the Islamic Society of Boston (ISB), an organization building a mosque in Roxbury, a Boston neighborhood, was linked to individuals the Project characterized as extremists. On behalf of the Project, Jacobs alleged that the ISB had connections to at least two individuals whose views Jacobs took to be problematic. The David Project, and Jacobs's new organization Citizens for Peace and Tolerance, was sued for defamation by the Islamic Society of Boston (ISB) in October 2005. The ISB's suit alleged that the Project had conspired with other groups to defame the Society by claiming it was associated with extremists, thereby impeding ISB's construction of its Roxbury mosque. The Project, for its part, sued Boston's Redevelopment Authority (BRA) in October 2006 to obtain information relevant to the city's sale of land to the ISB. In 2007, the David Project's suit against the BRA was dismissed, and the ISB dropped its defamation action soon afterward.

Jacobs left the David Project in July 2008.

== Americans for Peace and Tolerance ==
Along with several other local figures including Ahmed Subhy Mansour, Steven A. Cohen, and Dennis Hale, Jacobs founded Americans for Peace and Tolerance (APT) (originally Citizens for Peace and Tolerance), in response to the ongoing construction of the Roxbury mosque. The Forward describes APT as "a group focused on radical Islam". Jacobs describes APT as "an organization of Christians, Jews and Muslims promoting authentic interfaith dialogue and opposing Radical Islam [sic]." Jacobs has been described as a counter-jihad activist.

The Boston Globe has characterized Jacobs as "[t]he primary critic of the [Roxbury] mosque." Jacobs has claimed, on behalf of APT, that "[w]e think the [Islamic Society of Boston] leadership are hiding behind the general Muslim population" and asserted that those funding the project were associated with extremists. United States Attorney Carmen Ortiz characterized APT's view in this connection as "incredibly racist and unfair." Jacobs has noted that his group held a rally at the mosque's opening attended by Frank Gaffney, director of the Center for Security Policy. (According to public IRS filings, APT received over $121,457 from Gaffney's organization in 2009.) As late as 2014, Jacobs and another APT official claimed that the Islamic Society of Boston "constitutes a vast infiltration tunnel beneath our feet."

Under Jacobs's leadership, Americans for Peace and Tolerance has conducted several subsequent advocacy campaigns in the Boston area. The Boston Globe has described it as "a group that has accused many local Muslim leaders of being secret radicals." In 2012, for example, APT launched an effort to dismiss Abdullah Faaruq, a volunteer Muslim chaplain at Northeastern University, alleging, among other complaints, that the chaplain had made statements in support of Tarek Mehanna. In 2013, Jacobs alleged that an imam of the Islamic Society of Boston Cultural Center was an extremist. This claim was rejected by Todd Helmus, a counterterrorism researcher at the RAND Corporation; and Diana L. Eck, a professor of comparative religion at Harvard University. In 2015, Jacobs and other APT officials alleged that a member of the Cambridge, Massachusetts City Council was a "secret radical" because he had been involved in a local chapter of the Council on American-Islamic Relations.

In 2010, Jacobs was involved in publicizing an incident in the Wellesley, Massachusetts public schools during which non-Muslim students visited the Islamic Society of Boston Cultural Center and were permitted to participate in prayers. The mosque's leadership group, the Muslim American Society of Boston responded to Jacobs's allegations, arguing that APT had misrepresented the situation by suggesting that students had been directed to pray when in fact they had not.

In 2013, APT condemned material it alleged was taught in the public schools of Newton, Massachusetts, suggesting that its content was anti-Semitic and biased against Israel. As part of its efforts in this regard, APT launched an advertising campaign alleging that the educational material was anti-Israel and "glorif[ied] Islam." Local school officials and religious leaders vigorously disputed APT's allegations. The claims in APT's ads were challenged by the Anti-Defamation League, which called APT's claims "misleading" and argued in a report it issued on the controversy that APT's "charge" with respect to the educational material "lacks evidence and is irresponsible." The Commonwealth of Massachusetts and the town of Newton have also rejected APT's claims.

== Political views ==
=== Islam and Muslims ===
Jacobs has authored columns praising prominent counter-jihad activists such as Brigitte Gabriel; Ezra Levant; Mark Steyn; Robert Spencer; and Pamela Geller, who he terms a "Jewish heroine" and "one of the most courageous Jewish women of our time." Jacobs has referred to Steven Emerson as a "terrorist expert," and has praised Frank Gaffney as "fabulously eloquent," encouraging readers of his column to attend a public lecture Gaffney delivered in 2010.

Jacobs has consistently attempted to discredit the notion of Islamophobia, describing it as an "Islamist political tool," a "specter," a "bogus concept," and "a term created and employed by radical Islamists." He has claimed that the "Muslim community" is "dominated by radical Islamists posing as moderates," although on other occasions alleges that Muslims in America, while "historically moderate," are now becoming radical. He has alleged that 80 percent of mosques have been "radicalized." Jacobs claimed at a public forum that "I believe in the possibility of a moderate American Islam, but I believe that Saudi extremists are here to strangle that possibility." He has further suggested that American society has fallen victim to "Islamists" who "exploit our laws and values ... to facilitate the promotion of Islam and Sharia law," and warned of a "stealth jihad" in America. Writing with Avi Goldwasser in 2012, he suggested that at least some Muslim students on American university campuses "should be required to attend sensitivity training about Judaism and about American values of tolerance."

Jacobs has voiced particular concern about the Jewish community in relation to the threat he perceives from Islam. He has suggested that the Jewish community is under "ideological and perhaps physical threat from the alliance of progressives and radical Muslims," later elaborating in an interview with Steve Bannon on Breitbart News Daily to claim that "the left-Muslim alliance presents the greatest threat to Jewish life on this planet." He argues that "the Jews of Europe have sustained unrelenting political and physical assault by the growing Left/Islamist (or "Red/Green") Alliance, which holds Israel, and its supporters in the West, responsible for all the world's ills." Jacobs likewise alleges that Muslim immigrants have had a negative impact on Jewish life outside the United States, claiming, for example, that "Judeophobic Muslim immigrants in Europe are driving the Jews out."

=== Human rights groups ===
Jacobs frequently argues that American and European human rights groups ignore human rights violations committed by actors of non-European descent. "The human rights community," he has claimed, "composed mostly of compassionate white people, feels a special duty to protest evil done by those who are like 'us'."

=== Israel ===
Jacobs claims that demonization and delegitimization of Israel, which he terms "anti-Israelism," is equivalent to antisemitism, and further argues that "[a]nti-Israelism dominates the current discourse." Jacobs has often warned of what he terms a "left/Muslim alliance" antagonistic to Israel.

Speaking for the David Project at a rally in 2004, Jacobs said in relation to the Israeli–Palestinian conflict that "[i]f Arabs wanted peace, there would be peace."

=== Jewish organizations ===
Jacobs has long taken issue with some Jewish organizations such as the Anti-Defamation League (ADL) and Jewish Community Relations Council (JCRC).

In 2011, Jacobs criticized the ADL for failing to address "Islamic anti-Semitism" and instead focusing on Islamophobia, which he alleged was "a term created and employed by radical Islamists to block and stain with the racist label, any public concern about Islamist beliefs and conduct." In 2013, he claimed that the ADL had failed to advocate for "Jewish concerns," instead focusing on what he termed "what today passes for 'liberal' universalist values."

In 2015, Jacobs condemned J Street and the New Israel Fund, alleging that these organizations "come just inches away from justifying the murder of Jews."

In 2016, he claimed that the Boston JCRC's support of a Massachusetts bill relative to rights for transgender people was a "a perfect example of the misguided policy of the far-left led JCRC which places primacy on supporting issues that have nothing to do with Jewish interests and in fact gives power to those who are most hostile to Israel: the left-wing victimhood PC alliance basket of feminists, gays, transgenders, and 'anti-racist' professionals." Earlier, he had claimed that the "[Boston] JCRC and all Jewish bodies need to drop its [sic] fear of being called the [sic] bigots and Islamophobes in order to stand up to Islamic antisemitism."
