= Izgi Amal =

Izgi Amal (Kazakh: Ізгі амал) is a Quranist organization based in Kazakhstan.

== Background ==
The group is led by Aslbek Musin, the son of the former Speaker of the Majlis, Aslan Musin, both of whom are Quranists. In 2009, there was a public debate on the religious status of Quranists in Kazakhstan, who are represented by the representatives of Izgi Amal within the country. During the public debate chaired by the Tolerance Society and the National Security Committee, other religious minorities were also scrutinized with probes into their religious status, such as the Krishna Consciousness Society and Salafism. With regard to the Quranists, concern was particularly raised as the leading base for Islamic scholarship based at Azhar University had recently issued a fatwa declaring the Quranist denomination as being illegal within the country, and furthermore imprisoned the leading Quranist personality within the country called Ahmed Mansour. Nonetheless, spokesmen of Izgi Amal have argued that it isn't a strictly religious organization and rather engages in activities associated with societal and economic upliftment within Kazakhstan. The main concentration of Quranists in Kazakhstan is in the western parts of the Mangystau Region.

== Strands ==
There are two main strands in the Izgi Amal movement, the Quran aloners and the Quran-centric Izgi Amalists.

=== Quran-aloners ===
There are two main strands among the Izgi Amalist Quranists. One strand is the one that uses terms such as "Quran alone"; this subset of Quranists exclude all religious texts which are not the Quran and uses it as the sole source of religiosity. Some Izgi Amalists use the self-identifiers of Quranites, Quran aloners or Quraniyoon to describe themselves, while retorts such as munkirū al-ḥadīṯ (منكروا الحديث) (i.e. "negators of Hadith" / "hadith rejectors"), have in turn been levelled at them.

=== Quran-centric ===
The other set of Quranists in Izgi Amal take a less sweeping stance and avoids usage of the term "Quran alone", instead using terms such as Quranist or may even avoid using self-identifiers altogether. The set of Izgi Amal Quranists who avoid usage of the word "Quran alone", specify their doctrine as one which is Quran focused rather than exterior texts. For Izgi Amalists who utilize the application of additional sources besides the Quran, their standpoint is that unlike hadithists, they do not consider such texts as canonical to the faith. From the perspective of some Quran centric Izgi Amalists, the usage of tafsir is permitted, however, reliance on hadith texts as a primary source runs the risk of insinuating that the Quran needs supplemental text, or even suggestive of additional religious texts or the peril of abrogating the Quran. As such, Izgi Amal Quranists view the term hadith in its modern usage as a canonical collection as a misnomer, as from their perspective, the original archaic sense referred to the Quran itself. As such, Izgi Amal Quranists use the classical, obsolete or archaic sense of the word hadith.
