= Americans for Peace and Tolerance =

American nonprofit organization

- Abbreviation: APT
- Type: 501(c)(3) non-profit organization
- Headquarters: Boston, Massachusetts
- Region served: United States
- President: Charles Jacobs
- Main organ: Board of Directors (Jacobs, Dennis Hale, and Ahmed Subhy Mansour)
- Website: peaceandtolerance.org

Americans for Peace and Tolerance (APT) is a Boston, Massachusetts, 501(c)(3) non-profit organization which describes itself as being devoted to "promoting peaceful coexistence in an ethnically diverse America by educating the American public about the need for a moderate political leadership that supports tolerance and core American values in communities across the nation". It has been labeled a hate group by American Muslim organizations, which allege that it has consistently targeted the Boston Muslim community through smear campaigns and guilt-by-association tactics. US attorney for Massachusetts Carmen Ortiz has labeled the group and its claims "incredibly racist and unfair".

== History ==
APT was founded by Charles Jacobs, Boston College political science professor Dennis Hale, and Egyptian exile and the Quranists Muslim Ahmed Subhy Mansour. Jacobs was previously the co-founder of the American Anti-Slavery Group in 1993, and the David Project in 2004.

In October 2013, APT took out newspaper ads in the Boston Globe, Boston Herald, Newton TAB, Boston Metro, and Jewish Advocate, noting the presence of anti-Israeli materials being incorporated into the Newton Public Schools curriculum. The school system's use of the 'Arab World Studies Notebook' was sharply criticized, including claims that Muslims had discovered America in 889. The source had been criticized earlier by the American Jewish Committee for its proselytizing approach to Islam, and by Native American groups for other claims, including that Muslims become chiefs of Algonquin tribes in the 17th century.

In 2016, the APT released a documentary on the BDS movement called Hate Spaces: The Politics of Intolerance on Campus. The film tracks the history of Students for Justice in Palestine and its ties to Middle Eastern donors. It includes scenes of antisemitism under the pretence of anti-Zionism on campuses like Northeastern University. It suggests that university professors take funding from anti-Zionist donors out of cynicism rather than ideology, which influences their perspective on Israel in class.

== Opposition to Islamic Society of Boston ==
APT has been a major critic of the Islamic Society of Boston, and of the construction in 2009 in the city's Roxbury neighborhood of the $15.6 million Islamic Society of Boston Cultural Center, which includes a mosque. APT asserts that the group is directed and controlled by extremist leaders and contributors. The Islamic Society of Boston rejected the charges.

In 2007 Islamic Society of Boston had dropped a defamation lawsuit filed against the David Project and other groups, over revelations that the city of Boston had sold land to the mosque at far below market value. The mosque's fundraiser, who oversaw the land sale, was Mohammad Ali-Salaam, Deputy Directory of the Boston Redevelopment Authority.

In a 2009 op-ed, the APT's Hale and Jacobs wrote that the new Islamic Center was "paid for largely by the Saudis, and run by what federal authorities describe as the overt arm of the Muslim Brotherhood." They added that "it is way past time for sensible citizens to demand answers to questions about the leaders of the new Islamic Center in Roxbury." Mosque leader Yusuf Vali replied that the vast majority of construction donors were U.S. based, and added that "no donations were accepted if the donor wanted to have any decision-making influence (even if benign)."

Boston mayor Thomas Menino defended the Islamic Center, as did William A. Graham, dean of Harvard Divinity School, who said fear of the Islamic Center of Boston was "highly exaggerated." The mosque opened despite APT's protests.

Following the April 2013 bombing of the Boston Marathon, Jacobs renewed his argument that the Islamic Society of Boston Cultural Center (where the suspects had once worshipped) and its affiliated mosques in Cambridge and Roxbury are tied to extremists, claiming in a USA Today opinion article that people have been radicalized there from their curriculum, although the mosque has condemned the bombing and asked one of the suspects to stop attending due to openly challenging and interrupting the Friday prayer service.

== Anti-Muslim criticism ==
APT has been criticized for anti-Muslim biases and activities since its inception. In 2011, a group of seventy Rabbinical community leaders together published a letter in The Jewish Advocate calling upon the group's president, Charles Jacobs, "to discontinue his destructive campaign against Boston's Muslim community, which is based on innuendo, half-truths and unproven conspiracy theories." The Jewish religious leaders also called "upon members of our community to reject the dangerous politics of division that Mr. Jacobs fosters." In a 2015 article in the New York Times, US Attorney Carmen Ortiz labeled APT's claims about the Muslim community "incredibly racist and unfair." The group's tax returns reveal that it is funded by some of the most notorious anti-Muslim hate groups in the United States, such as the Middle East Forum, which has been labeled "part of the inner core of the U.S. Islamophobia network."

Individual members of the organization have been criticized for professing bigoted perspectives toward Muslims. Charles Jacobs was a main figure in the CBS article "The Great Islamophobic Crusade," while Ahmed Subhy Mansour is infamous within the Muslim community for having supported former Congressman Tom Tancredo's proposal for bombing Mecca. The US State Department has called Tancredo's statement "insulting and offensive."
