= Quincy Mosque =

Mosque in Massachusetts, USA

Location
- Location: Quincy, Massachusetts, United States
- Interactive map of Quincy Mosque
- Coordinates: 42°14′36″N 70°58′45.5″W

Architecture
- Type: Mosque
- Established: 1963

Quincy Mosque is situated in Quincy, Massachusetts, in the Quincy Point neighborhood, founded in 1963 by Lebanese workers in the area's shipyards.

== History ==
Between 1875 and 1914, eight Lebanese families immigrated to the Quincy area to escape the Ottoman Empire forming the basis of the Muslim community. In 1934, the Arab-American community created the Arab American Banner Society to promote Arab unity and cohesion as well as to champion American ideals. To cement their position in the community, the group founded the Quincy Mosque, of the Islamic Center of New England, in 1964, the first dedicated building and mosque in all of New England.

It consists of half of the Islamic Center of New England with its sister mosque in Sharon. As of 2016, the mosque has a membership of over two thousand, with 36 nationalities represented. Jumu'ah prayers are held every Friday. Al Noor Academy began as a high school inside this mosque, before moving out in 2004. The mosque currently houses the Al-Bayan School.

The mosque was damaged by fire in 1990 and again in 2003. Both incidents were believed to have been arson, although no suspects were ever identified. "Muslim Communities of North America," Chapter 13; and "Bird on a Wire," by Mary Lajaj.www.birdonawirebook.com

== Imams ==
- 2005-current: Khalid Nasr
- 1982-2005: Talal Eid

== See also ==
- List of mosques in the Americas
- Lists of mosques
- List of mosques in the United States
