= American Anti-Slavery Group =

Abolitionist organization

The American Anti-Slavery Group (AASG) is a non-profit coalition of abolitionist organizations that engages in political activism to abolish slavery in the world. It raises awareness of contemporary slavery, particularly among the chattel slaves of Mauritania and Sudan, raises funds to support relief and aid to enslaved populations and escaped former slaves, and lobbies government officials to increase their efforts. AASG'

AASG was co-founded in 1993 by Charles Jacobs (who served as its first research director) with African human rights activists Mohamed Athie of Mauritania and David Chand of Sudan.

Incorporated in Newton, Massachusetts, the AASG reports having "many associates and 30,000 members around the world." Recent officers include: Mohamed Athie (past president) and Charles Jacobs (past clerk and treasurer; current president and member of board of directors).

AASG maintains close ties to The Sudan Campaign, for which Charles Jacobs serves as a co-chairman.

== Central components ==
AASG says that the first step in eradicating slavery is educating the public that it still exists. AASG builds awareness through publications, school curricula, conferences, and a Speakers’ Bureau, consisting mainly of survivors of slavery. AASG advocates for the freedom of those degraded by slavery through government lobbying and online campaigns, which locate pressure points in corporations that benefit from slavery, governments that tolerate human bondage, and leaders who remain silent. On their website, AASG state that they have a network of activists around the world who are passionate about freedom. Grassroots activism takes the form of rallies, candlelight vigils, freedom marches, petitions and letter-writing campaigns. AASG partners with organizations working on the ground to provide rehabilitation and support to victims of slavery.

== Modern-day slavery ==
On June 4, 2008, the U.S. released a trafficking in persons report. In this report Secretary of State Condoleezza Rice stated, "Trafficking and exploitation plague all nations, and no country, even ours, is immune."

== Controversies ==
The AASG claims of contemporary slavery have been met with criticism from BBC journalist David Hecht.

Hecht has challenged the AASG claims of rampant slavery in Sudan. "Yes, there is a slave (and master) mentality in Africa, but nothing like the dehumanized institutions that Frederick Douglass had to fight in America." He also reported that Western media are often naïve misunderstandings of the facts. Claiming that outside those areas controlled by the Sudanese Government, the old practice of intertribal feuding continues. In these raids prisoners are taken, who must then be ransomed. What looks like the purchase of slaves is actually the redemption of prisoners of war.

Anti-Slavery International has also stated that, "The charge that government troops engage in raids for the purpose of seizing slaves is not backed by the evidence."

=== Controversy of redemption program ===
The AASG supported program of arrangement of payment to human traffickers for the "freedom" of slaves has come under fire. Aid workers, missionaries, and even the rebel movement that facilitates the redemption of slaves in the claim it is often an elaborate scam or a "corrupt racket." Groups, including the Sudan Embassy, Canada, state that the practice of paying the rebels prolongs the war, while others claim it brought the "perverse incentives" of slavery in many areas. Manase Lomole Waya, who runs Humanitarian Assistance for South Sudan, a group based in Nairobi, praises AASG for its effort, but brings a warning: "We welcome them for exposing the agony of our people to the world," he said. "That part is good. But giving the money to the slave traders only encourages the trade. It is wrong and must stop. Where does the money go? It goes to the raiders to buy more guns, raid more villages, put more shillings in their pockets. It is a vicious circle."

Charles Jacobs, president of the American Anti-Slavery Group, concedes there is an increase in slave-taking since 1995 in terms of the growing intensity of the Sudanese war, but rebukes characterizations that it creates a market for the slave trade. He asserts that although war is the context for the slave trade, it cannot be the main cause. Thus, the transactions to free slaves do not contribute to the cycle of violence in the Sudan.

== See also ==
- Contemporary slavery
- Human trafficking
