= Dennis Hale (political scientist) =

American political scientist

- Education: Oberlin College; Brooklyn College; City University of New York Graduate Center
- Employer: Boston College
- Title: Professor of Political Science

Dennis Hale (born c. 1944) is an American political scientist who works as a professor of political science at Boston College.

== Education ==
Hale has a B.A. from Oberlin College (1966), an M.A. from Brooklyn College (1969), and a Ph.D. from the City University of New York Graduate Center (1977).

== Career ==
Hale has taught at Boston College since 1978, and worked as the department chair for eight years (1989–97). Hale has published essays on local government, American political thought, public administration, and the modern experience of citizenship. He has co-edited two volumes of essays by French political scientist Bertrand de Jouvenel, and is completing a book on democracy and the jury system. Hale's essays and reviews have appeared in the Political Science Quarterly, PS, Society, The Journal of Politics, Polity, APSR, State and Local Government Review, Administration and Society, The Political Science Reviewer, The Washington Post, and Newsday.

He has often been quoted by the media on his areas of expertise, including by The Boston Globe, The New York Times, The Boston Phoenix, The New York Sun, The Christian Science Monitor, and The Concord Monitor.

=== Americans for Peace and Tolerance ===
He is a co-founder of Americans for Peace and Tolerance, along with Charles Jacobs and Islamic scholar Sheikh Dr. Ahmed Subhy Mansour. It states its purpose as "promote peaceful coexistence in an ethnically diverse America by educating the American public about the need for a moderate political leadership that supports tolerance and core American values in communities across the nation." The group is a primary critic of the $15.6 million mosque in Roxbury Crossing, which the group asserts is led by extremist leaders and contributors.

== Bibliography ==
Author

- The Jury in America: Triumph and Decline, 2016, ISBN 0-70062-200-4
- Keeping the Republic: A Defense of American Constitutionalism (with Marc Landy), 2024, ISBN 0-70063-623-4

Editor

- The New Student Left (with Mitchell Cohen), Beacon Press, 1966
- The California Dream (with Jonathan Eisen), The Macmillan Company, 1968
- The United States Congress, Transaction Publishers, 1983, ISBN 0-87855-939-6
- The Nature of Politics: Selected Essays of Bertrand de Jouvenel (with Marc Landy), Schocken Books, 1987, ISBN 0-80524-023-3

== See also ==
- List of Oberlin College and Conservatory people
- List of Boston College people
