= Islamic Society of Greater Manchester =

The Islamic Society of Greater Manchester is an Islamic organization based in Manchester, New Hampshire, United States, that operates the largest mosque in the state of New Hampshire. As of 2006 there were approximately 3,000 Muslims in New Hampshire.

== Origins ==
The society originated among the Muslim Student Association at Southern New Hampshire University. They initially held their Friday prayers in a room on campus that the school allocated to them. Southern New Hampshire University economics professor Mahboubul Hassan was the advisor to the organization. After SNHU sold the part of campus that hosted the meetings, the group began planning to build a mosque, working with Muslim immigrants who settled in New Hampshire. In 1998 the Islamic Society of Greater Manchester was created to pursue this task, and the society has been engaged in efforts to build a mosque in Manchester ever since. Mahboubul Hassan then became the president of the society. While the mosque is being built, they hold prayer meetings in the headquarters of the society. Their offices have been located in several different places, including a dance studio and the basement of a beauty school.

== Mosque ==
In 1999 the society was twice denied permits to build a mosque in a rural area of east Manchester by the city of Manchester's Zoning Board of Adjustment and filed a lawsuit in response. The city of Manchester allowed the group to re-submit their plans in 2003. City officials had opposed the building plans because the road leading to the building site was of very poor quality, parking was limited, and blasting would be required. After the planning board approved the plans, neighboring residents individually sued to stop the construction, claiming that they owned a portion of the land. In 2005 a judge ruled in favor of the society, and they were able to begin construction. New Hampshire state representative Saggy Tahir has been a vocal supporter of the planned mosque. Siraj Wahhaj of Al-Taqwa mosque in Brooklyn traveled to New Hampshire to speak at a fundraiser for the project. After construction began, local pastors and the Greater Manchester Interfaith Council called on local churches to volunteer to help with the construction. The move caused some controversy among local residents, some of whom were vocally opposed to allowing the construction of a mosque. Construction commenced, however, though it often proceeded slowly due to unexpected costs. The society plans to build a 13,000-square-foot (1,200 m^{2}) three-level domed octagonal building. It will not have a minaret or loudspeakers. The building site has been regularly vandalized, although vandalism was an issue for the previous owners as well.

== Other activities ==
Leaders of the society engage in efforts to build tolerance for Muslims among New Hampshire residents and participate in interfaith activities. Some of them met with New Hampshire law enforcement officials and hosted gatherings with FBI officials designed to combat harassment of local Muslims. Such gatherings have been hosted in the wake of the September 11 attacks and the 2003 invasion of Iraq.
