= David Bernstein (activist) =

American chief executive

David L. Bernstein
- Office: President and CEO of the Jewish Council for Public Affairs

David L. Bernstein is an Israel advocate, the founder and the CEO of North American Values Institute, formerly known as The Jewish Institute for Liberal Values. Bernstein served as president and CEO of the Jewish Council for Public Affairs (JCPA) from 2016-2021. Until his appointment, Bernstein served as a consultant dedicated to assisting organizations and communities in strengthening their Israel education, engagement and advocacy work. He is also founder of CultureSolutions LLC, which works with non-profits on strategic planning and culture change efforts.

He served as executive director of The David Project from August 2010 to September 2014. During his time at The David Project, Bernstein transformed and re-branded the organization, focusing on the need for expanding relationships with campus opinion leaders, intensifying efforts at particular campuses and utilizing a more neutral approach for discussions about Israel.

Bernstein also held senior roles with the American Jewish Committee (AJC), where he began as director of the Washington regional office and served in management roles overseeing regional offices and national and local programming and advocacy. During his time at AJC, Bernstein was a leading pro-israel advocate on the legislative, diplomatic, media and inter-group relations fronts. He has provided pro-Israel media training in cities across the country and to Israeli diplomats based in the U.S.

Bernstein founded the Jewish Institute for Liberal Values (JILV) in 2021 to counter antisemitism in the social justice movement. In February 2025, JILV changed its name to the North American Values Institute (NAVI) to combat the alleged rise of antisemitism in K-12 education, especially since the October 7 attacks on Israel. NAVI's budget was $2.5 million.

Bernstein wrote Woke Antisemitism: How a Progressive Ideology Harms Jews in 2022. The book argues that woke culture fosters antisemitism.
