= Ahmed Subhy Mansour =

Egyptian-American activist (born 1949)

Sheikh Dr. Ahmed Subhy Mansour
- أحمد صبحي منصور
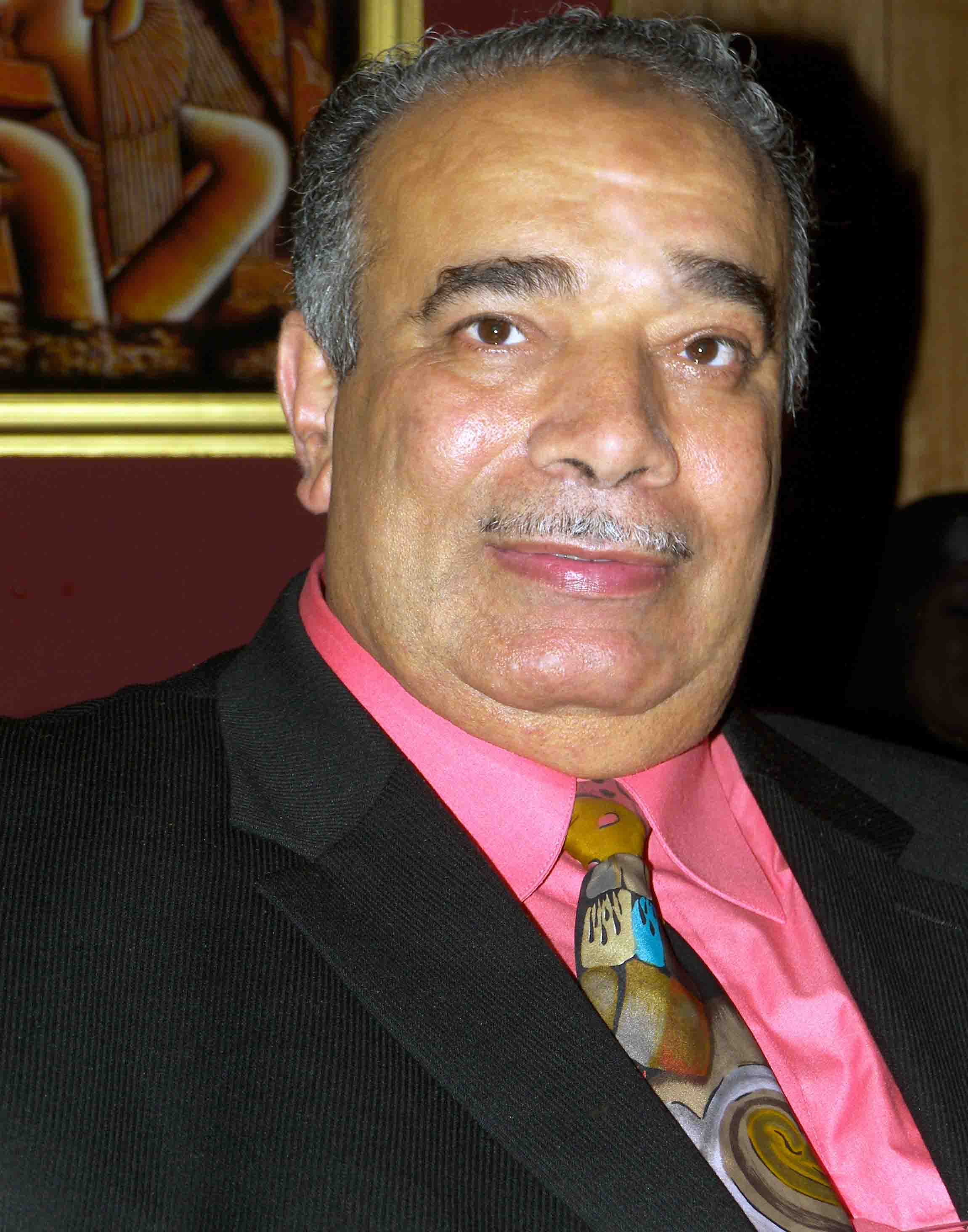
- Mansour in 2010
- Born: March 1, 1949 (age 77); Abu Harair, Kafr Saqr, Sharqia, Egypt
- Education: B.A (highest honors; 1973), M.A. (honors; 1975), Ph.D (highest honors; 1980)
- Alma mater: Al-Azhar University
- Occupations: Islamic scholar and cleric
- Known for: Islamic advocate for democracy and human rights.
- Title: Sheikh Dr.
- Board member of: International Quranic Center; Americans for Peace and Tolerance; Free Muslims Coalition

Ahmed Subhy Mansour (Arabic: أحمد صبحي منصور; born March 1, 1949) is an Egyptian-American activist and Quranist scholar dealing with Islamic history, culture, theology, and politics. He founded a small Egyptian Quranist group. In 1987, he was fired from Al-Azhar University after expressing his liberal views. One of his fellow Islamic scholars at Al-Azhar University, Sheikh Jamal Tahir, took up the same Quran alone stance. Mansour was exiled from Egypt, and lives in the United States as a political refugee. In the United States, he established the Ahl-Alquran website.

== Biography ==
Mansour received his junior middle school education in 1964, and ranked second in the Republic on the national exam. He graduated from Al-Azhar Secondary School, in Sharkeya, Egypt, in 1969, and ranked fourth in country on the national university entrance examination. He then studied Muslim History at the Al-Azhar University (a prestigious Sunni religious university) in Cairo, where he obtained a B.A. degree with Highest Honors in 1973, an M.A. degree with Honors in 1975, and a Ph.D. degree with Highest Honors in 1980.

He founded a small Egyptian group, the Quranists, who believe: the Quran is the sole source of Islam and its laws.

From 1973 till 1980 he was an assistant teacher and lecturer, and between 1980 and 1987 he was an assistant professor, both of Muslim history at the College of Arabic Language of the Al Azhar University.

In May 1985, Mansour was discharged from his teaching and research position in Egypt due to his liberal views, which were not acceptable to the religious authorities who controlled much of university policies and programs. Because of his unconventional scholarship, Al-Azhar University accused him of being an enemy of Islam. He was tried in its canonical court, and expelled March 17, 1987. In 1987, beginning with his arrest on November 17, and in 1988 he was imprisoned by the Egyptian government for his views, including his advocacy of religious harmony and tolerance between Egyptian Muslims, Christian Copts, and Jews.

Between 1991 and 1992, he worked with Farag Foda to establish a new political party in Egypt, Mostakbal ("The Future Party"), dedicated to a secular democratic state, and to defend the Christian Egyptians. Foda was assassinated in June 1992.

From 1994 to 1996, he was a member of the board of trustees of the Egyptian Organization for Human Rights, which worked to protect Egyptians from human rights offenses. In 1996, Mansour established a weekly conference at the Ibn Khaldoun Center – headed by Saad Eddin Ibrahim – in order to discuss Islamist dogma, religion-based terror, and other issues. It functioned until June 2000, when the center was closed down by the Egyptian government and Ibrahim was arrested.

Mansour sought and was granted political asylum in the United States in 2002.

From 28 September 2009 to 27 September 2010, Mansour served as a Fellow at The US Commission on International Religious Freedom. From 7 September 2010 to May 2011, Mansour served as fellow at The Woodrow Wilson Center.

On 13 April 2011, Mansour served as a witness at the House Permanent Select Committee on Intelligence, Subcommittee on Terrorism, HUMINT, Analysis, and Counterintelligence, where he presented his expert opinion on the Muslim Brotherhood and the Salafi groups in Egypt and the Muslim World. (Website: https://web.archive.org/web/20120917004719/http://intelligence.house.gov/sites/intelligence.house.gov/files/documents/SFR20110413Mansour.pdf)

== Quranism ==
=== In the US ===
He and his sons operate the Quranic Center in Northern Virginia, which includes an Internet site in Arabic and English. On its website at www.ahl-alquran.com, the organization is republishing dozens of Mansour's books and hundreds of articles he has written over the years.

Since arriving in the United States in 2002, Mansour has held a number of academic posts. In 2002, he was a Reagan-Fascell Democracy Fellow at the National Endowment for Democracy in Washington, where he wrote on the roots of democracy in Islam.

The next year, he received a visiting fellowship at Harvard Law School's Human Rights Program.

In October 2004, he said that the leaders of the Muslim organization behind a new $22 million mosque in Roxbury tolerated "hateful views", and harbored extremists. In 2004 Daniel Pipes lauded him for speaking out against Islamists.

In 2007, The Washington Times reported that his teachings have earned him dozens of death fatwas from fellow Muslim clerics, the punishment of apostasy in Sunni sectarian Islam.

In 2008, he said of the Council on American-Islamic Relations (CAIR), "The culture of CAIR is the same as Osama bin Laden, but they have two faces. Who are the moderates? You probably never heard of them, and that, they say, is part of the problem. The message of peace does not make the news."

International Quranic Center

Mansour founded and is a board member of the International Quranic Center (IQC) to further his vision of moderate Islam.

They do not identify themselves as Sunnis' or Shiites' sects but simply call themselves Muslims because they believe that the Qu'ran represents the single authentic scripture of Islam. The basic differences with the rest of the Orthodox Muslims is that they reject the Hadith and Sunna, purported sayings and traditions of the prophet Muhammad. Mansour claims about 10,000 followers in Egypt.

Americans for Peace and Tolerance

He is a co-founder and board member of Americans for Peace and Tolerance, along with political activist Charles Jacobs and Boston College political science professor Dennis Hale (an Episcopal layman). It states its purpose to "promote peaceful coexistence in an ethnically diverse America by educating the American public about the need for a moderate political leadership that supports tolerance and core American values in communities across the nation." The group is a primary critic of the $15.6 million mosque in Roxbury Crossings, which the group asserts is led by extremist leaders and contributors. Mansour said: "I visited this mosque one time with my wife. I found their Arabic materials full of hatred against America. I recognized they were Wahhabis." The Islamic Society of Boston sued him over his attacks on anti-American and anti-Semitic statements he said he read and heard inside the society's mosque. He is also a founder and board member (since October 2004) of Citizens for Peace and Tolerance.

Free Muslims Coalition

Mansour is also a board member (since September 2004) of the Free Muslims Coalition, a nonprofit organization of American Muslims and Arabs who feel that religious violence and terrorism have not been fully rejected by the Muslim community. The Coalition seeks to eliminate broad base support for Islamic extremism and terrorism, to strengthen secular democratic institutions in the Muslim world by supporting Islamic reformation efforts, and to promote a modern secular interpretation of Islam which is peace-loving, democracy-loving, and compatible with other faiths and beliefs.

Center for Islamic Pluralism

Mansour is the founder and the interim president of Center for Islamic Pluralism.

=== Arrests in Egypt ===
In May and June 2007, Egyptian authorities arrested five leaders of the movement, including Mansour's brother, on charges of "insulting Islam", and began investigations of 15 others. Following the arrests, Mansour's homes in Cairo and Sharqia were searched by the State Security.

Paul Marshall analyzed the arrests in the Weekly Standard as follows:

These arrests are part of the Egyptian government's double game in which it imprisons members of the Muslim Brotherhood when the latter appear to become too powerful, while simultaneously trying to appear Islamic itself and blunt the Brotherhood's appeal by cracking down on religious reformers, who are very often also democracy activists."

== Works ==
Mansour has authored 24 books and 500 articles (in various newspapers and magazines, including Al Akhbar, Al-Ahram, Al Khaleej, and Al Watan) in Arabic, dealing with many aspects of Islamic history, culture, and religion. They include a history of Wahhabism in Saudi Arabia; a critique of the concepts of jihad, bigotry, and dictatorship in Muslim thought; women's rights in the Muslim world; the reform of Egyptian education; and various pieces of prose fiction and screen plays.

Mansour published 1873 articles in Arabic in Modern discussion until December 27, 2015 He also published more articles in Arabic and in English in Ahl Al Quran site including tens of Arabic books and hundreds of Fatwas and 64 Arabic episodes of ( Exposing Salafism), which was published on Ahl al Quran site and on YouTube . He also recently published other Arabic Books in Arabic on Facebook

=== Books ===
Books in Arabic

1. Al Sayed Al Badway: Fact versus Superstition. Cairo, 1982.
2. Using Religious Texts to Inform Muslim History. Cairo, 1984.
3. The Personality of Egypt after the Muslim Invasion. Cairo, 1984.
4. The History of the Historic Sources of Arabic and Muslim Fields. Cairo, 1984.
5. The Fundamental Rules of Historical Research. Cairo, 1984.
6. The Invasions of the Moguls and the Crusaders in Muslim History. Cairo, 1985.
7. A History of the Cultural Development of Muslims. Cairo, 1985.
8. The Muslim World between the Early Stage and the Abbasy Caliphate. Cairo, 1985.
9. The Prophets in the Holy Quran. Cairo, 1985.
10. The Sinner Muslim: Common Mythology Regarding the Sinner Muslim. Cairo, 1987.
11. Egypt in the Holy Quran. Al Akhbar newspaper, Cairo, 1990.
12. The Quran: the Only Source of Islam and Islamic Jurisprudence (published under the title The Quran: Why? using the pseudonym Abdullah Al Khalifah) Cairo, 1990.
13. Death in the Quran. Dar Al Shark Al Awsat, Cairo, 1990.
14. The Penalty of Apostasy. Tiba Publishing, Cairo, 1992; Al Mahrousah, 1994; Al Mothakkafoun Al Arab (The Arab Intellectuals Publishing Company), 2000; English translation, The International Publishing and Distributing Company, Toronto, Canada, 1998.
15. Freedom of Speech: Islam and Muslims. The Egyptian Organization for Human Rights, Cairo, 1994.
16. The Al Hisbah between the Quran and Muslims. Al Mahrousah, Cairo, 1995; Al Kahera magazine, Cairo, 1996.
17. The Torture of the Grave. Tibia, Cairo, 1996; Al Mothakkafoun Al Arab, Cairo, 2000.
18. Naskh in the Quran Means Writing Not Abrogating. Al Tanweer magazine, Cairo?? 1997; Al Mahrousah, Cairo, 1998; Al Mothakkafoun Al Arab, Cairo, 2000.
19. The Introduction (mokademat) of Ibn Khaldoun: A Fundamental Historical and Analytical Study. The Ibn Khaldoun Center, Cairo, 1999.
20. Suggestions to Revise Muslim Religion Courses in Egyptian Education to Make Egyptians More Tolerant. Ibn Khaldoun Center, Cairo, 1999.
21. Religious Thought in Egypt in the Mamluke Era: Islam versus Muslim Sufism. Ministry of Culture, Cairo, 2000.
22. Al-Aqaid Al-Diniyah Fi Misr Al-Mamlukiyah Bayna Al-Islam Wa-Al-Tasawwuf, by Ahmad Subhi Mansur, ISBN 977-01-6991-9, al-Hayah al-Misriyah al-Ammah lil-Kitab
23. Al-Tasawwuf Wa-Al-hayah Al-Diniyah Fi Misr Al-Mamlukiyah, by Ahmad Subhi Mansur, ISBN 977-313-057-6, Markaz al-Mahrusah lil-Buhuth wa-al-Tadrib wa-Nashr
24. Misr Fi Al-Quran Al-Karim, by Ahmad Subhi Mansur, ISBN 977-12-4355-1, Muassasat Akhbar al-Yawm

=== Select articles ===
- "Mediaeval theocracies in a modern age", by Ahmed Sobhi Mansour, Al-Ahram, October 15–21, 1998
- "The Roots of Democracy in Islam", National Endowment for Democracy, December 16, 2002
- "The False Alarm of Evangelism", April 28, 2005
- "The Suicide Bomber", FrontPage Magazine, August 3, 2—5
- "They ask you about the veil", November 21, 2006
- "A Shackled Reformation; Egypt persecutes Muslim moderates", The New York Times, February 3, 2009

=== Select testimony ===
- Testimony to the U.S. Senate Judiciary Committee, Washington, D.C., October 25, 2005

== See also ==
- Quranism

== Sources ==
- Free-Minds bio
- Washington Times Article
- Conflict & cooperation: Christian-Muslim relations in contemporary Egypt, Peter E. Makari, Syracuse University Press, 2007, ISBN 0-8156-3144-8
