= David P. Bernstein =

Dutch psychologist

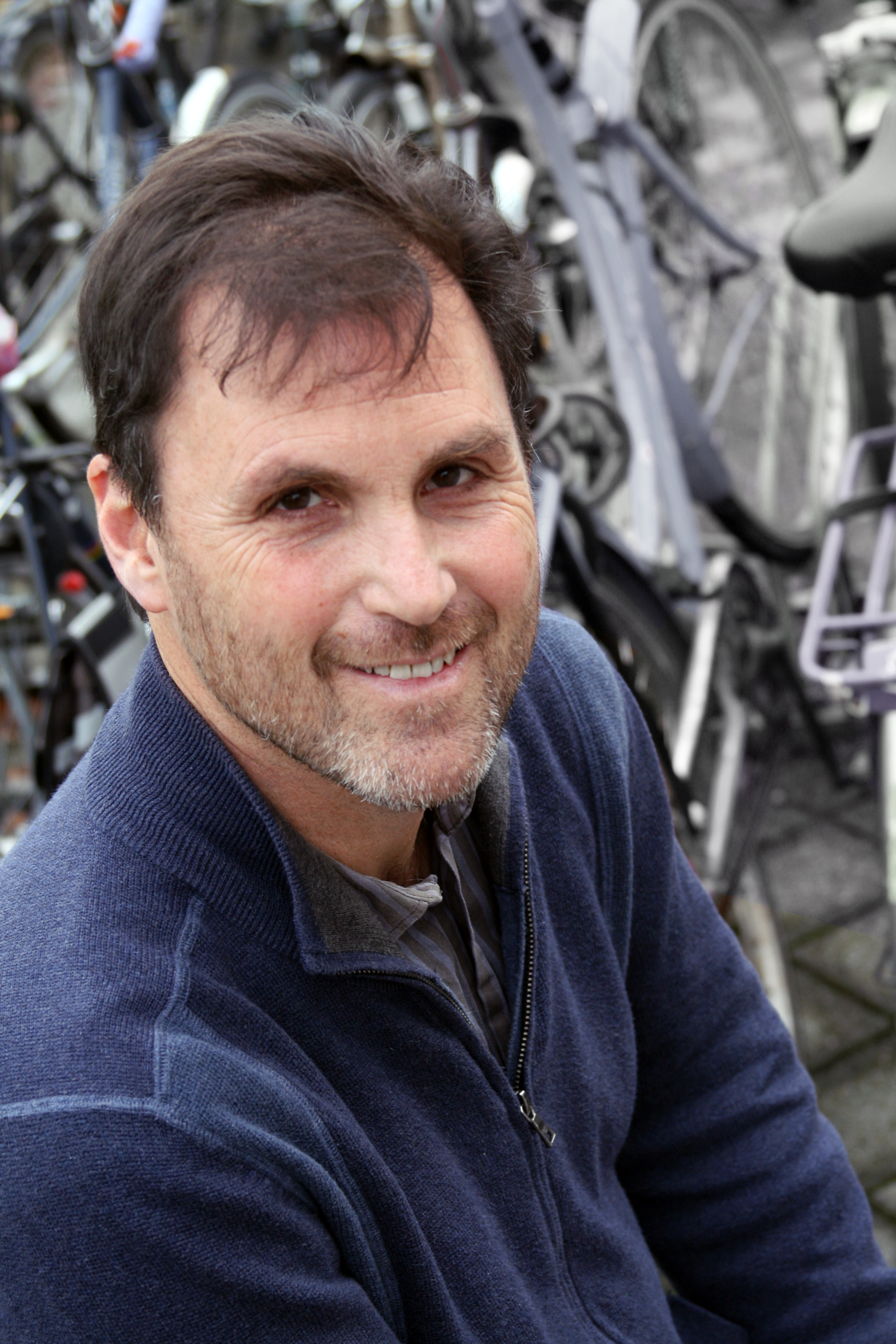
Dr. David Bernstein

David Philip Bernstein (born 1956) was professor of forensic psychotherapy at Maastricht University in the Netherlands, an endowed chair jointly sponsored by Forensic Psychiatric Center "de Rooyse Wissel" (sponsorship until 2018). His work is also supported by the Expertise Center for Forensic Psychiatry (EFP). At Maastricht University, Bernstein leads the forensic psychology section, which is embedded within the department of clinical psychological science. Bernstein has served as President of the Association for Research on Personality Disorders, Vice President of the International Society for the Study of Personality Disorders and Vice President of the International Society for Schema Therapy.

Before coming to the Netherlands, Bernstein had already conducted research on personality disorders for twenty years, in, for example, his position as Associate Professor in the Department of Psychology at Fordham University, New York, where he was a co-director of the forensic psychology program.

He is also the brother of television writer Jim Bernstein and the first cousin of historian David Greenberg.

== Treating the untreatable ==
Bernstein was trained by Jeffrey Young and colleagues to be a schema-focused therapist, and has extensively supervised, given workshops, and written on schema therapy (ST), which is an integrative approach for personality disorders and treatment-resistant patients. In 2004, Bernstein came to the Netherlands with the intention to conduct research on the effectiveness of ST in individuals with personality disorders. Around that time, research on the effectiveness of this therapy form was already being conducted by Arnoud Arntz, Josephine Giesen-Bloo, and colleagues, showing ST to be effective in treating (nonforensic) outpatients with borderline personality disorder.

Because of a great need for better treatment for forensic patients (who often suffer from personality disorders, e.g., Antisocial Personality Disorder), Bernstein and his colleagues adapted the ST approach to meet the challenges posed by this population (e.g., aggression and callousness). Subsequently, Bernstein initiated a large randomized clinical trial (RCT) testing the effectiveness of ST in comparison to regular treatment ('treatment as usual') for forensic patients with cluster B personality disorders in seven 'TBS' institutions in the Netherlands: Forensic Psychiatric Clinics de Rooyse Wissel, van der Hoeven, Oostvaarders, Mesdag, Veldzicht, Kijvelanden, and FPK Assen. (In Dutch, TBS stands for 'TerBeschikkingStelling,' which may be translated as 'placed at the disposal' of the government in one of the specialized institutions for forensic psychiatric care).

Over the past years, over 100 patients have been participating in this RCT. Preliminary findings in the first 30 patients to complete the 3-year study suggest that ST is outperforming treatment as usual with respect to lowering recidivism risk (i.e. the risk of recommitting crimes), and facilitating resocialization into the community. These findings are not yet statistically significant, and need to be confirmed after all patients have finished three years of therapy. However, they suggest that ST is a promising treatment for forensic patients with cluster B personality disorders. As results seem to show that ST is also beneficial for individuals with high levels of psychopathy, Bernstein's research challenges the view that psychopathic people are untreatable.

Not surprisingly, interest in implementing the forensic adaptation of the ST treatment program has been shown by mental health professionals from various countries, including the UK, Germany, Switzerland, The Netherlands, Australia, Singapore, and Canada.

== Bernstein iModes ==
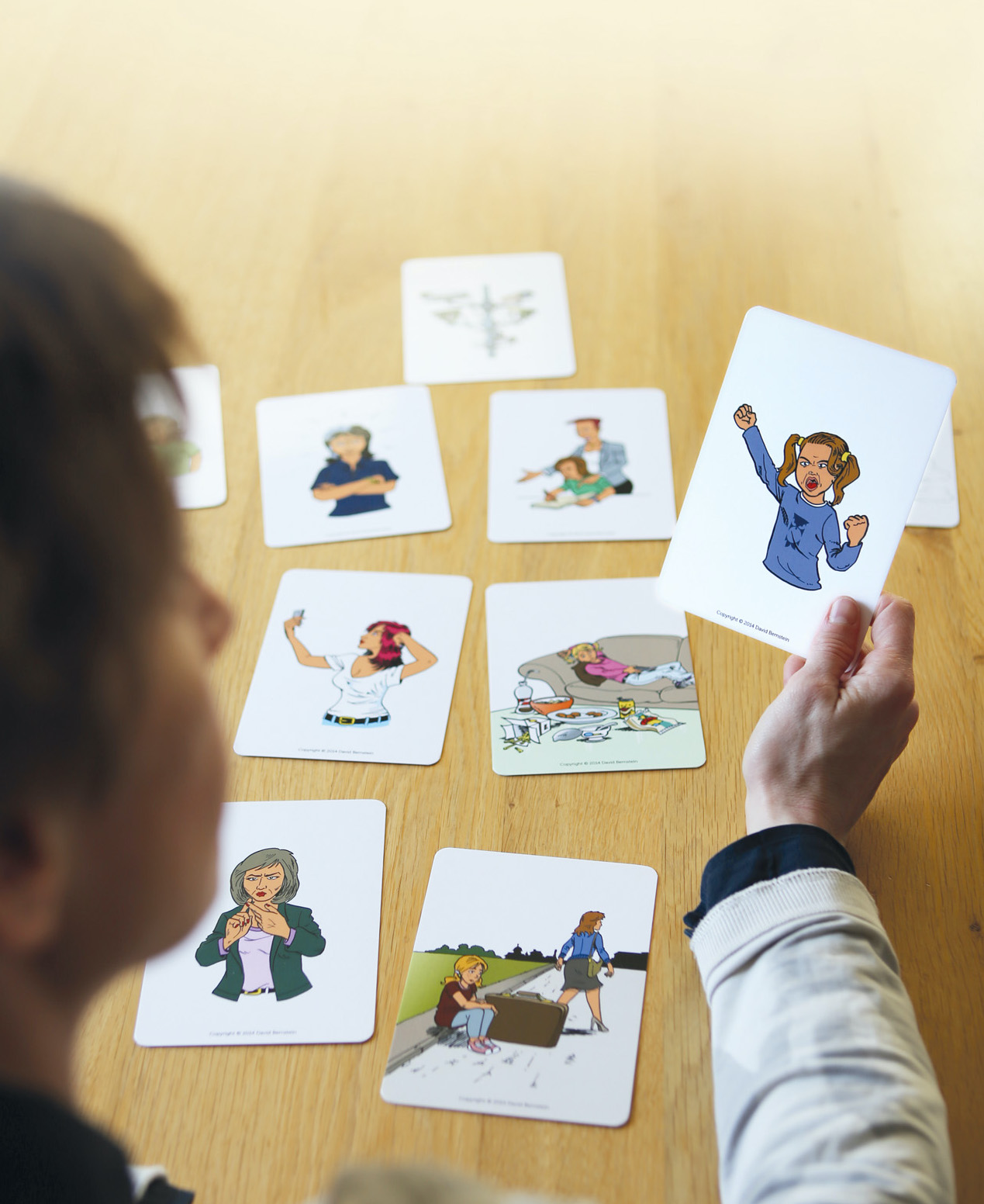
The Bernstein iModes in use.

Besides his academic achievements, David Bernstein has developed psychotherapeutic tools together with comic book artist, “Vick”. During his therapeutic work, he noticed that various schema mode concepts in schema therapy are rather complex (i.e. "Detached Self-Soother) and that patients sometimes find it difficult to understand what they entail (i.e. detachment from painful feelings through behavior that is numbing). For this reason, he developed the Bernstein iModes; these cards are visual representations of the schema modes. In essence, they are cartoon-like images that depict schema modes in a vivid way, with an image depicting a schema mode on the front and the name and short description of that schema mode on the back. The visualisation of schema modes makes it easier for people to recognize emotional states in themselves and others. Because schema modes consist of a cluster of maladaptive behaviors, cognitions and emotions that are common to a lot of mental health disorders, therapists from many therapeutic orientations (cognitive, behavioral, psychodynamic) can employ the iModes in their practice. It's a suitable tool for psychoeducation, diagnosis and treatment.

== Academic achievements ==
Bernstein's major areas of research interest are personality disorders, psychological trauma, and forensic issues. His academic achievements include over 100 peer-reviewed articles and book chapters on these topics, grants, invited presentations at international meetings, and service as a journal editor and reviewer. He is also author of the Childhood Trauma Questionnaire, a widely used self-report measure of child abuse and neglect. Recently, Bernstein co-produced a DVD series on how to work with patients with different personality disorders using the ST approach, and functioned as Conference Co-Chair for the International Society of Schema Therapy Conference (New York, March 2012).

On June 15, 2012, Bernstein's inaugural lecture as professor of forensic psychotherapy took place (titled, "Big Boys Don't Cry! Or Do They? Can Forensic Patients Change?"). In conjunction with the inauguration, Dutch national television broadcast a special television program on his research on schema therapy with psychopathic individuals. Berstein's professorship ended in 2019 when the sponsorship of this position lapsed.

== Publications ==
The following shows a selection of books, book chapters, and academic journal articles (co-)authored in the past 5 years by Bernstein.

- Bernstein, D.P. & Nijman, H. (in review). Treatment of personality disordered offenders in the Netherlands: A multicenter randomized clinical trial on the effectiveness of Schema Therapy. International Journal of Forensic Mental Health.
- Rafaeli, E., Bernstein, D.P., & Young, J. E. (2011). Schema Therapy: the CBT distinctive features series. New York, NY: Routledge.
- Van den Broek, E., Keulen-de Vos, M., & Bernstein, D. P. (2011). Arts therapies and Schema Focused Therapy: a pilot study. The Arts in Psychotherapy, 38, 325-332.
- Chakhssi, F., de Ruiter, C., & Bernstein, D.P. (2010). Change during forensic treatment in psychopathic versus nonpsychopathic offenders. The Journal of Forensic Psychiatry & Psychology, 21, 660-682.
- Keulen-de Vos, M., Bernstein, D.P., Clark, L.A., Arntz, A., Lucker, T., & de Spa, E. (2011). Patient versus informant reports of personality disorders in forensic patients. The Journal of Forensic Psychiatry & Psychology, 22, 52-71
- Lobbestael, J., Arntz, A., & Bernstein, D. P. (2010). Disentangling the relationship between different types of childhood maltreatment and personality disorders. Journal of Personality Disorders, 24, 285-295.
- Thombs, B., Bernstein, D. P., Lobbestael, J., & Arntz, A. (2009). A validation study of the Dutch Childhood Trauma Questionnaire-Short Form: factor structure, reliability, and known-groups validity. Child Abuse and Neglect, 33, 518-523.
- Bernstein, D. P., Arntz, A., & Travaglini, L. (2009). Schizoid and avoidant personality disorders. In T. Millon, P. Blaney & R. Davis (Eds.), Oxford Textbook of Psychopathology (pp. 586–601). London: Oxford University Press.
- Lobbestael, J., Arntz, A., Harkema-Schouten, P., & Bernstein, D. P. (2009). Development and psychometric evaluation of a new assessment method for childhood trauma: the Interview for Traumatic Events in Childhood (ITEC). Child Abuse and Neglect, 33, 505-517.
- Arntz, A., Bernstein, D., Gielen, D., van Nieuwenhuijzen, M., Penders, K., Haslam, N., et al. (2009). Cluster-C, paranoid, and borderline personality disorders are dimensional: evidence from taxometric tests. Journal of Personality Disorders, 23, 606-628.
- Arntz, A., Bernstein, D., Oorschot, M., Robson, K., & Schobre, P. (2009). Theory of mind in borderline and cluster-C personality disorder. Journal of Nervous and Mental Disease, 197, 801-807.
- Bernstein, D. P., Arntz, A., de Vos, M. (2007). Schema Focused Therapy in forensic settings: theoretical model and recommendations for best clinical practice. International Journal of Forensic Mental Health, 6, 169-183.
- Bernstein, D. P. & Useda, J. D. (2007). Paranoid personality disorder. In W. O'Donohue, K. A. Fowler, & S. Lilienfeld. (Eds.), Personality Disorders: Toward the DMS-V. Thousand Oaks, CA: Sage Publications.
- Bernstein, D. P., Iscan, C., Maser, J. (2007). Opinions of personality disorder experts regarding the DSM-IV personality disorders classification system. Journal of Personality Disorders, 21, 536–551.
- Thombs, B.D., Bernstein, D. P, Ziegelstein R. C., Bennett W, & Walker E. A. (2007). A brief two-item screener for detecting a history of physical or sexual abuse in childhood. General Hospital Psychiatry, 29, 8-13.
