= The David Project =

Pro-Israel campus group in United States

- Formation: 2002; 24 years ago
- Founder: Charles Jacobs and Avi Goldwasser
- Dissolved: 2017
- Purpose: Pro-Israel campus activism
- Headquarters: Washington, DC
- Executive Director: Phillip Brodsky
- Key people: Charles Jacobs
- Parent organization: Hillel International
- Website: www.davidproject.org

The David Project (TDP) was an American pro-Israel campus group. The purpose of TDP was to build diverse pro-Israel support on campuses. TDP began in 2002 as an agency of Hillel International, an international Jewish campus organization. In 2017, it merged with Hillel International's Israel Engagement and Education department. In 2019 it evolved into the Hillel U Center for Community Outreach.

TDP was founded in 2002 by Charles Jacobs, who previously co-founded CAMERA. He served as its president until August 2008. David Bernstein, previously Program Director of American Jewish Committee (AJC), began leading TDP in July 2010 and in September 2014, Phillip Brodsky took over.

TDP was an associate member of the Israel on Campus Coalition.

== Mission ==
From the website of TDP, "empowers student leaders to build mutually beneficial and enduring partnerships with diverse organizations so that the pro-Israel community is integrated and valued on campus." TDP focused on building student partnerships and helping Israel groups reach out to their peers to talk about Israel.

== Activities ==
Major activities of TDP included:

- Israel Uncovered - Sponsored ten-day trips to Israel for Jewish and non-Jewish campus Israel advocates.
- Relationship Building Institute – Training for students to learn Israel advocacy methods through building relationships.

== Documentaries ==
=== The Forgotten Refugees ===
The David Project and IsraTV produced the documentary film The Forgotten Refugees in 2005, a documentary about the Jewish exodus from Arab and Muslim countries in the second half of the 20th century.

The film won the "Best Featured Documentary" at the Warsaw Jewish Film Festival in 2006 and "Best Documentary Film" at the 2007 Marbella International Film Festival.

=== Columbia Unbecoming ===
In 2004, the David Project produced a documentary film titled Columbia Unbecoming. The film interviewed pro-Israel students at Columbia University who complained that professors had intimidated or been unfair to them over their political views. The release of the film led to an inquiry and to United States Representative Anthony Weiner to call for one of the professors involved, Joseph Massad, to be fired. The inquiry found no evidence for the complaints and the political motive of the students filing them were questioned.

== Harvard University ==
TDP was involved in pressuring Harvard University to reject funds from Sheik Zayed bin Sultan Al Nahyan, ruler of the United Arab Emirates, who funded and lent his name to a think-tank based in Abu Dhabi that they saw as Anti-American and Anti-Semitic. The campaign, led by Rachel Fish, who later became an employee of TDP, and her student supporters, contributed to Zayed's decision to shut down the Zayed Center in August 2003, saying that it "had engaged in a discourse that starkly contradicted the principles of interfaith tolerance."

In July 2004, the campaign concluded when Harvard decided to reject the $2.5 million donation from the Sultan Al Nahyan. Through her activism, in 2003, Fish was named one of the 50 most influential Jews in America by The Forward.

== Boston Mosque Controversy ==
In 2005, TDP, its director of education, 13 other groups and two media outlets; the Boston Herald and Fox Television's Channel 25 were sued by the Islamic Society of Boston (ISB) which alleged that they "conspired to publish and broadcast false and defamatory information about mosque leaders in part to halt development of [a] project ... [p]lanned as the largest mosque in New England." In 2006, The David Project sued the Boston Redevelopment Authority to obtain documents regarding the authority's sale of land to the Islamic Society of Boston for construction of a mosque, which revealed that some funding for the mosque had come from the Islamic Development Bank of Saudi Arabia. On May 29, 2007, the ISB dropped its lawsuit against all defendants. After the lawsuit was dropped, Charles Jacobs of the David Project continued opposition to the building of the mosque, saying "We are more concerned now than we have ever been about a Saudi influence of local mosques."

== Criticism ==
The Forward wrote in 2004 that TDP had "a national reputation for hounding Muslims that it perceives to be a threat to the Jewish community."

== See also ==
- Israel On Campus Coalition (member)
- Death of Daniel Wultz
- Public diplomacy of Israel
