= Talal Eid =

American imam (born 1951)

Talal Eid (Arabic: طلال عید; born 1951) is an imam from Lebanon who has combated the portrayal of Muslims as terrorists and served as Commissioner of the US Commission on International Religious Freedom.

== Biography ==
Talal Eid was born in 1951 in Lebanon. He graduated with a degree in Islamic Law (sharia) from Jamia al-Azhar University in Cairo in 1974. In 2005, he received his Doctor of Theology degree from Harvard Divinity School in Cambridge, Massachusetts where his thesis was entitled "Marriage, Divorce, and Child Custody as Experienced by American Muslims: Religious, Social, and Legal Considerations."

After being unwilling to support the Lebanese war, he was nominated to the Muslim World League and was appointed a position in America. In 1982, Eid became the spiritual Director of the Islamic Center of New England, and as the Imam of Quincy Mosque in Quincy, Massachusetts. His duties included leading prayer, teaching school, participating in interfaith activities, performing burials, giving lectures, providing family counseling, and witnessing conversions and marriages.

He left the mosque on July 30, 2005 due to a factional fight in which he resigned from the role. In 2005, Eid became the Imam and Executive Director of the Islamic Institute of Boston, holding the position until 2015. He was also the Muslim chaplain at Brandeis University, the Massachusetts General Hospital in Boston, and the Brigham and Women Hospital in Boston.

After the September 11 Attacks, Eid visited many high schools, churches, and community organizations to combat the portrayal of Muslims as terrorists.

On 15 May 2007, he became the first Muslim cleric appointed to the US Commission on International Religious Freedom by President George W. Bush. He served as Commissioner until June 2011.

In June 2015, he became Imam and Director of Religious Affairs of the Islamic Center of Greater Toledo.

Preceded by Unknown	Quincy Mosque Imams; Imam Talal Eid; 1982–2005	Succeeded by Khalid Nasr; 2005-Present
