= Islamic Society of Boston =

Mosque in Massachusetts, United States

Coordinates: 42°19′51.2″N 71°5′36.1″W

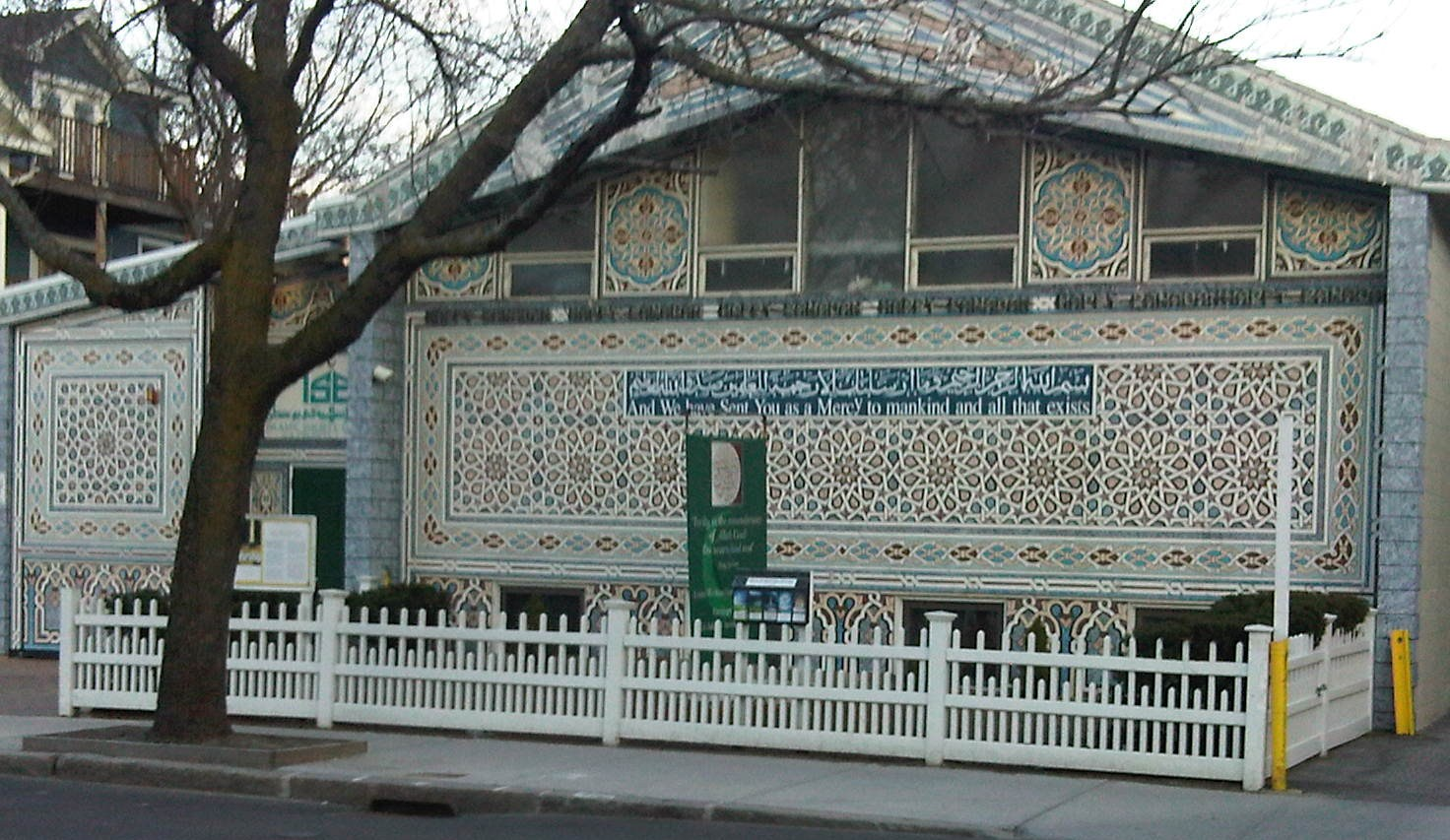
Islamic Society of Boston headquarters in Cambridge, Massachusetts

The Islamic Society of Boston (ISB) is an organization that runs two mosques in the Boston area. The original mosque called Islamic Society of Boston is in Cambridge, Massachusetts. In 2007, the Islamic Society of Boston Cultural Center (ISBCC) was built in Roxbury, Boston. Both mosques offer daily, weekly and annual programs for Muslims including Arabic and English classes on religious and secular topics. ISB also has a religious school for children and holiday programs. It organizes trips and summer camps for children and classes on Islam for new and non-Muslims.

== History ==
The society was founded in 1981 by Muslim students as a consolidation of Muslim Students' Associations at Harvard University, Boston University, Massachusetts Institute of Technology, Northeastern University, Wentworth Institute of Technology, Suffolk University, and Tufts University. The organization's first location was a hall reserved at MIT where they held prayers and weekly seminars and classes. In 1991, the ISB purchased a Cambridge building as a community center and in 1993 purchased a second location and began to renovate it. In 1994 they opened the second location as a mosque. The ISB has also purchased a rental property to provide income for the annual operating expenses of the center.

Reports of ties to radical Islam and terrorism have been controversial and disputed. The society had brought suit in 2005 for defamation against individuals and institutions issuing press and other reports of these ties. However, it abandoned the suit in 2007 when "one after another of the allegations made by the Islamic Society [in its suit] collapsed." According to prominent First Amendment lawyer Floyd Abrams, who served as defense counsel in the suit, documents revealed in the discovery phase of the lawsuit confirmed the accuracy of reports tying the Islamic Society of Boston to radical Islam and terrorism.

This mosque shares many of its members and teachers with the nearby mosques of Islamic Center of New England.

The mosque has been praised by Christian religious leaders as "an American Muslim institution, well respected in Cambridge, contributing positively to the community at large."

The mosque temporarily shut down during the COVID-19 pandemic.

== Building project ==
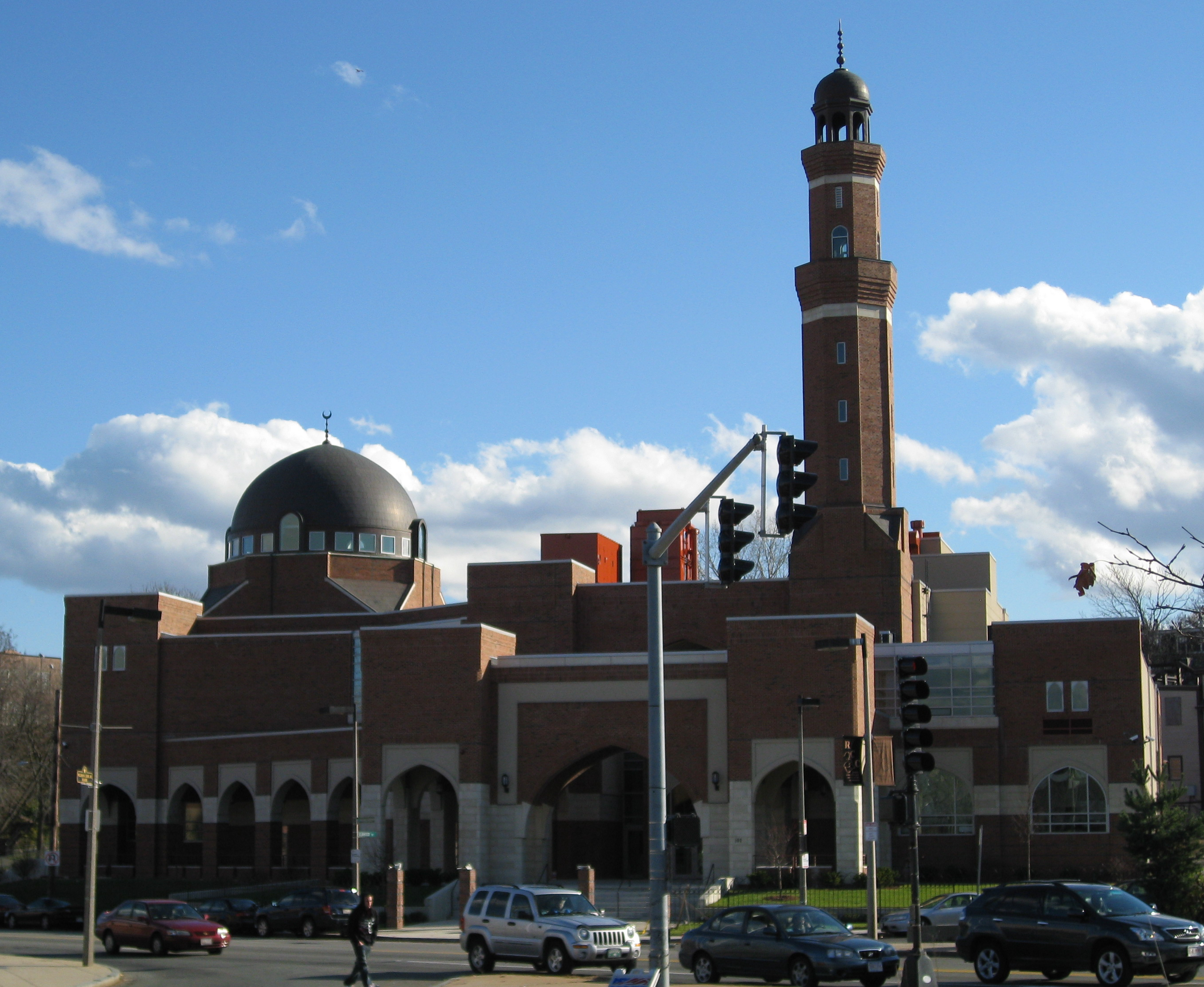
Islamic Society of Boston mosque in Roxbury

In 1999, ISB purchased land from the Boston Redevelopment Authority to build an Islamic community center, near the campus of Roxbury Community College. The deal was supported by Boston mayor Thomas Menino. The ISB agreed to compensate the city for some of the cost of the land through community service by donating books to and sponsoring lectures about Islam for the college, as well as a 10-year agreement to maintain local parks; in exchange they were able to purchase land valued at $401,187 for $175,000. The project broke ground in 2003. The building project was surrounded by controversy, such as concerns about the land purchase deal and the city employee who negotiated the deal was also an ISB member and fundraiser. The David Project, a right-leaning advocacy group began a campaign against the project and filed a lawsuit against the city of Boston. Some Jewish groups were critical of the ISB, while other Jews launched a website to support the mosque.

The facility can accommodate 3000 individuals in its sanctuary, includes an Islamic school for children, an Islamic library, a morgue with burial preparation facilities, administrative offices, a media center, store, a women's gymnasium, a kitchen, a hall for events, and an underground parking garage. Opening events included an interfaith breakfast with appearances by Boston mayor Thomas Menino and the local heads of many Christian denominations, as well as a Muslim congressional representative.

== Outreach ==
The ISB is active in dawah, or educating the public about Islam. As part of this, the community engages in an interfaith project with Temple Beth Shalom in Cambridge. The organization participates in civil rights work with the ACLU, and has received a grant from the National Conference for Community and Justice (NCCJ) for civil rights and civics training for the Muslim community in Boston.

== See also ==
- List of mosques in the Americas
- Lists of mosques
- List of mosques in the United States
- Islam in the United States
