= Islamic Center of New England =

Mosque in Quincy, Massachusetts

Incorporated in 1964
- Quincy Center
- Address: 470 South St., Quincy, Massachusetts
- Country: United States
- Property acquired: 1934
- Architect: Joseph Donohue

Islamic Center of NE in Sharon
- Islamic Center of New England
- Address: 74 Chase Drive, Sharon, Massachusetts
- Country: United States
- Groundbreaking: 1993
- Denomination: Non-denominational
- Website: https://icne.net

The Islamic Center of New England (ICNE) is a non-sectarian, nonprofit organization that adheres to Islamic principles. It was incorporated in the Commonwealth of Massachusetts in 1962. Its precursor, the Arab American Banner Society, was certified in the Commonwealth on November 9, 1937. The ICNE manages two mosques: the original mosque in Quincy (1964), and a newer mosque built on 55 acres in Sharon, Massachusetts (1993).

== Mission and vision ==
The Islamic Center of New England (ICNE) is dedicated to preserving the Islamic identity of its community, serving the religious, educational, and social needs of Muslims in the Greater Boston area, and promoting a better understanding of Islam through education and outreach.

== Origins: The Quincy mosque ==
The birth and growth of Muslim communities in New England can be traced to the original eight (8) Muslim families who emigrated from Syria at the turn of the 20th century and settled in an ethnic enclave in Quincy, Massachusetts. The patriarchs of these families (and the years they arrived in America) include Abdullah Abraham (1895); Ameen Sulieman (1908); Toufic Derbes (1909); the two Hassan brothers, Ismail and Abduh (1909); Mohamed Omar (1914); Ali Eldeb (1913); and Selman Allie (1913). Most of the families had never met before settling in Quincy. The mosque was finally built in 1964 by the American-born adult children who were members of these immigrant families. They were an indigenous group of founders.

In the early 1920s, France was among the Western powers colonizing the Arab world. It colonized a region of Syria known as Mount Lebanon, including Beirut and parts of the Bekaa Valley. According to A.H. Hourani, Lebanon became a colony of France and a new country. For decades, the Syrian Muslim immigrant families resisted identifying themselves Lebanese, but next generation of American-born children had come to accept it.

Amidst the shifting global politics, the immigrant families living in the Quincy enclave struggled with ethnic and religious anonymity, as well as poverty. Although two of the eight founding families were of the Shia tradition and six were Sunni Muslims, the families were united by their dire situation. With little interest in sectarianism, they shared a long-range dream to one day build a mosque for their children. In 1934, they embraced a new national identity by forming the Arab American Banner Society (AABS), a charitable nonprofit organization. The AABS enabled them to raise funds to build a mosque.

== The first religious leader ==
The first religious leader (imam) was Haj Mohamed Omar. He emigrated in 1914 from a small village located north of Tripoli, Lebanon. He settled in Quincy in the 1930s with his family, and met the seven Lebanese Muslim patriarchs for the first time. Omar had studied the Qur’an in his youth and was familiar with rituals that involved Qur’anic recitation. He performed marriages and prepared the dead for burial. He served the community from 1939 to 1982 as a grassroots leader. Omar continued fundraising and pushed the group to get organized to build a mosque so they could better practice their faith.

== Thirty years of diaspora ==
For the next 30 years, the community faced obstacles such as the Great Depression and World War II, and had no national or local financial or religious resources. Many of the American-born adult children served in the military. After they married, members of this generation moved away from the Quincy enclave. However, once they had their own children, they joined the Arab American Banner Society and worked with their parents in the quest to build a mosque. They raised funds from their friends, customers, clients, employees, students, and neighbors (mostly Christian and Jewish).

In 1961, the Massachusetts State Legislature recognized the Arab American Banner Society for the first time and invited its leaders to meet the King of Saudi Arabia, King Saud Bin Abdulaziz Al Saud, at a State House reception. The second king of the Kingdom of Saudi Arabia arrived in Boston for eye surgery and met with the AABS representatives during his reception and recovery. In February 1962, the King sent a donation of $5,000 for the future mosque.

Given the sizable donation, the American-born leaders were incentivized to build a mosque from the ground up. Since all but one of the American-born founders had been to a mosque, they chose one of the leading architects in Quincy, Mr. Joseph Donahue, and modeled the mosque's governance after other American religious institutions, such as churches and synagogues. The Suliemans donated the land they owned at 470 South Street in Quincy. The small house on the land was razed, and the building completed in 1964. As the only brick-and-mortar mosque in New England, they named it the Islamic Center of New England.

The building’s dedication was held on October 19, 1964 and published in the local paper, the Quincy Patriot Ledger. The list of speakers and presenters at the dedication included the Cultural Attaché of the United Arab Republic from Washington, DC; Paul Handy, Lebanese Consul of Boston and New England; Quincy Mayor Amelio Della Chiesa; Joseph Laraia, president of the Quincy City Council; Rep. James R. McIntyre of Wollaston; Rabbi Jacob Mann of the Congregation Beth Israel (Quincy Point Synagogue); Rev. Philip A. Muth of Memorial Congregational Church of Quincy; and Imam Hussein Karoub of Detroit (touted by Arab American historians to have been the first Imam in the United States).

After 30 years, only a handful of American-born leaders remained active to maintain the new building and build a community. To attract more members, they advertised the Center in the Yellow Pages and at the airport. Congress's passage of the Immigration & Nationality Act of 1965 marked the second major wave of immigration to America. Muslim students and professionals came from more than 50 Muslim countries to work and study in cities such as Boston and Cambridge. To preserve their religious identity, they traveled by train and bus to the Quincy Center. The new members taught Qur’anic Arabic and religion at the Sunday school, and served on the Board of Directors.

== Diverse community ==
For more than a decade (1964 to 1974), the ICNE was the only dedicated brick-and-mortar mosque in New England. As a result, Muslims came from all six New England states and created a rapidly growing, diverse community. The African American Muslims of Boston also traveled to Quincy to learn about mainstream Islam and serve the community.

For example, in 1965 the ICNE formed ties with the Harvard Islamic Society (HIS) when the late Hajj Abu Nuri, an African American HIS member, joined the Center. Abu Nuri converted to Islam in 1940 while serving in the U.S. Army. He later served the Quincy community as vice president of the Board of Directors and editor of the newsletter. The late Hajj Imam Shakir Mahmoud was another African American leader who came to Quincy to learn and serve (1973). Shortly after converting to Islam in 1964, Shakir was inspired by Malcolm X to adopt mainstream Islam. In 1977, he became the first imam of the Masjid Al-Qur’an in Dorchester, Massachusetts, known then as Muhammad’s Mosque #11.

== Influence of the Muslim students ==
In 1963, students formed the Muslim Student Association (MSA), and the ICNE was among the first to join. The group made Islamic materials available that had never been translated into English before. They used their knowledge to guide the isolated, American-born founders in Quincy in conforming to Islamic standards. The Muslim students’ influence affected everything from fundraising activities to membership requirements, and from religious celebrations to knowledge of the different Islamic schools of law. During this period, the Ladies Auxiliary was also formed to organize and raise funds for the community that conformed to Islamic standards.

Most of the leaders who founded a mosque or Islamic Center in New England had once been a member of the Quincy Center and many had served on the board of directors at one time or another. As they built careers and families, many international students and professionals settled in cities, suburbs, and states throughout New England. For example, a small group from the Quincy mosque who lived in the state's MetroWest area founded the nonprofit, non-sectarian Islamic Center of Boston in Wayland (ICB) (1979).

Similarly, in 1981, a group of international students and professionals who had once taught Arabic and Qur’an at the ICNE founded the Islamic Society of Boston (ISB), a nonprofit, non-sectarian organization in Cambridge. In 1993, the ISB purchased a Knights of Columbus Hall. Once renovated (1995), it became the first mosque in Cambridge. In 2009, the ISB built the largest mosque (currently) in New England, the Islamic Society of Boston Cultural Center (ISBCC) in Roxbury, Massachusetts.

== Quincy mosque (1970s) ==
During the 1970s, Dr. A. Karim Khudairi organized the Sunday school reform program as an Arabic teacher. Dr. Khudairi, a biology professor originally from Iraq, was educated in this country. By 1974, the school was firmly established with 75 students and 25 adults enrolled. By 1991, reportedly over 300 students were registered. The basic format included four development levels (grades) for children across four subjects: Qur'anic Arabic, Qur'an Recitation, History of the Prophet Muhammad, and Religion.

== The Religious Director from Lebanon ==
In 1982, the Muslim World League sponsored 10 imams from Lebanon to come to America. They were trained at Al-Azhar University in Cairo, Egypt. The director of the Muslim World League, Dawud Assad, recommended Talal Eid to his long-time supporters and friends at the Quincy Center.

As a young boy in Tripoli, Lebanon, Talal Eid was certain he wanted to become an imam. He began his training at a private high school in Beirut, where he earned a degree in Islamic law and ethics. The five-year high school was a prerequisite for admission to Al-Azhar University in Cairo. At Al-Azhar, Eid studied law and jurisprudence in a curriculum that included both secular and Islamic sciences.

Talal Eid arrived in March of 1982 with his wife and two young daughters and has lived permanently in America. Under the revised Article V of the ICNE Constitution, the Board of Directors, with the approval of the general membership, determined the Religious Director's duties and the length of his tenure. With the imam's arrival, the community gained Islamic knowledge, and attendance increased fivefold. Before retiring, Eid and his wife, Hind, served the ICNE community in Quincy for 20 years.

== Islamic Council of New England ==
In 1983, Dr. A. Kareem Khudairi organized the Islamic Council of New England, headquartered at the Islamic Center in Quincy. The Council’s objectives included coordinating activities and communication among all Islamic centers, mosques, and Muslim student associations in New England. Twelve charter members joined the Council in 1983. By August 1991, the Council’s membership numbered eighteen (18).

The initial Council members included the following: The Islamic Center of New England, Quincy, MA; Islamic Center of Boston, Wayland, MA; Islamic Center of Connecticut, Hartford, CT; Islamic Center of Merrimac Valley, Salem, NH; Islamic Center of Rhode Island, Providence, RI; Islamic Society of Boston (Universities), Cambridge, MA; Islamic Society of Western Massachusetts, Holyoke, MA; Islamic Society of Greater Worcester, Worcester, MA; Masjid Al-Qur'an, Dorchester, MA; Masjid Ar-Razzaq, Providence, RI; Islamic Community of Fairfield County, Norwalk, CT; Mosque of New England, Seekonk, MA; Society of Islamic Brotherhood, Boston, MA; Islamic Center of University of Connecticut, Storrs, CT; Islamic Association of Greater Hartford, Hartford, CT; Islamic Society of Amherst Area, Amherst, MA; Masjid Muhammad, New Haven, CT; and the New England Muslim Sisters Association, Worcester, MA. This number has grown over the past forty years.

== Fire and arson ==
On March 30, 1990, during the holy month of Ramadan, an unknown arsonist set fire to the mosque in Quincy. The Quincy Fire Department asserted that the fire, which gutted the interior of the mosque, started in the kitchen. A few windows along the eastern wall of the prayer room were broken or cracked as firefighters did all they could to save the prayer room, which otherwise appeared undisturbed.

== Expansions ==
After two decades of multiple expansions of the original building in Quincy, the ICNE purchased 55 acres in Sharon, Massachusetts and built a new, non-sectarian mosque (1993).

== Islamophobic adversity ==
At first, when international tensions reached new heights, the ICNE board formed a public relations committee. That committee committed to pursuing and participating in interfaith activities to increase understanding. News reports on international politics and terrorism drew the ICNE onto the world stage.

For example, the Islamic Revolution in Iran and the hostage crisis in 1979. In June 1985, a TWA flight was hijacked. Other examples include Iran’s threat to kill author Salman Rushdie (1989) and the Gulf War (1991). These events sparked an increase in interest in Islam, Islamophobia, a national trend of interfaith activities involving Muslims, and continuous vandalism of the mosque's property. For instance, the Center’s dome had been vandalized so frequently that the Board stopped repairing it.

== ICNE today ==
The Islamic Center of New England in Quincy and Sharon perform the following services for the community: support for new converts; educational services for children and adults; funeral and matrimonial services; facility rental; and accommodation for people with disabilities.
